= List of members of the 16th Bundestag =

16th Bundestag
←	15th	17th	→
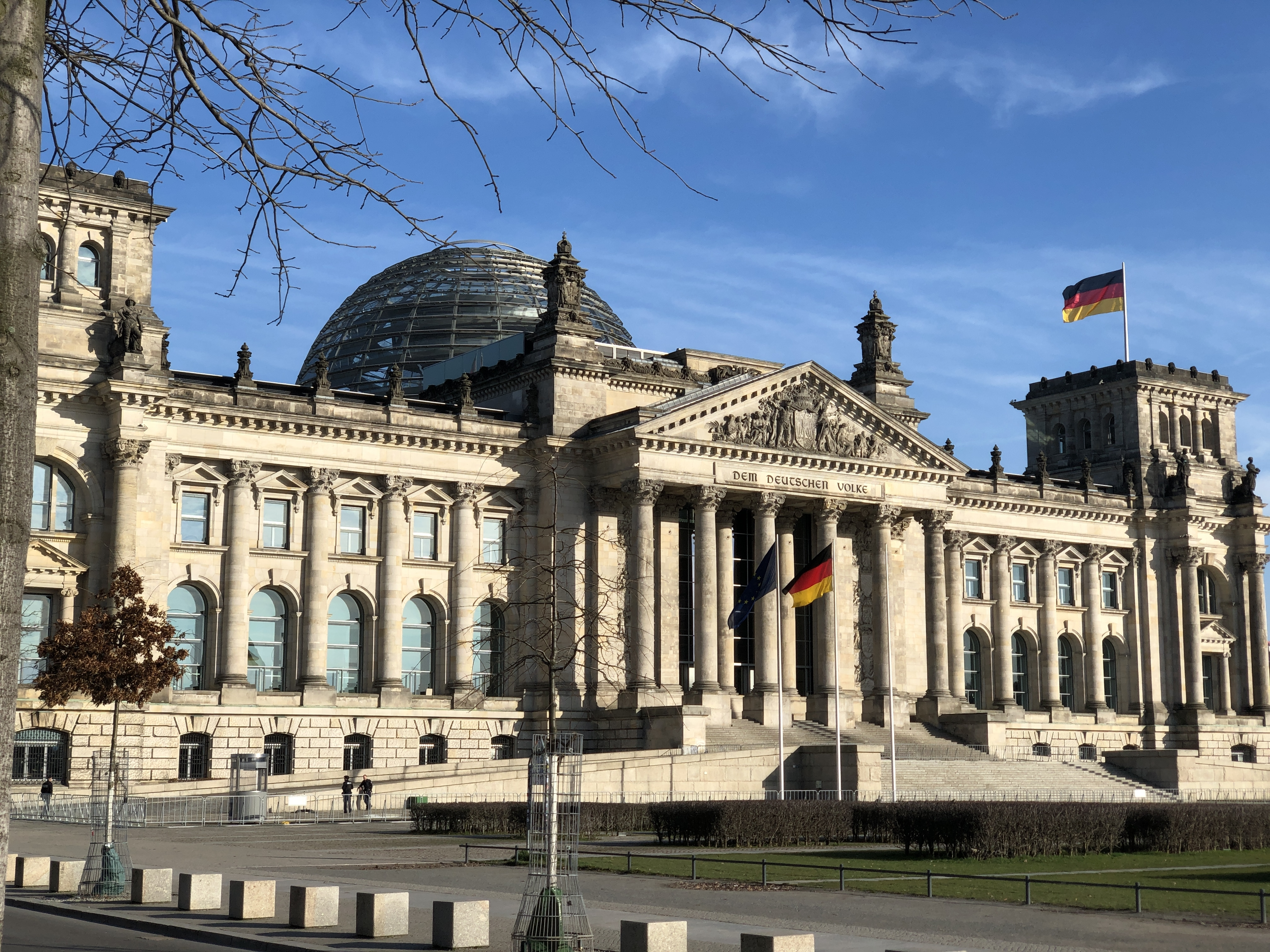
- Reichstag building in 2020

Overview
- Legislative body: Bundestag
- Jurisdiction: Germany
- Meeting place: Reichstag building, Berlin

Bundestag
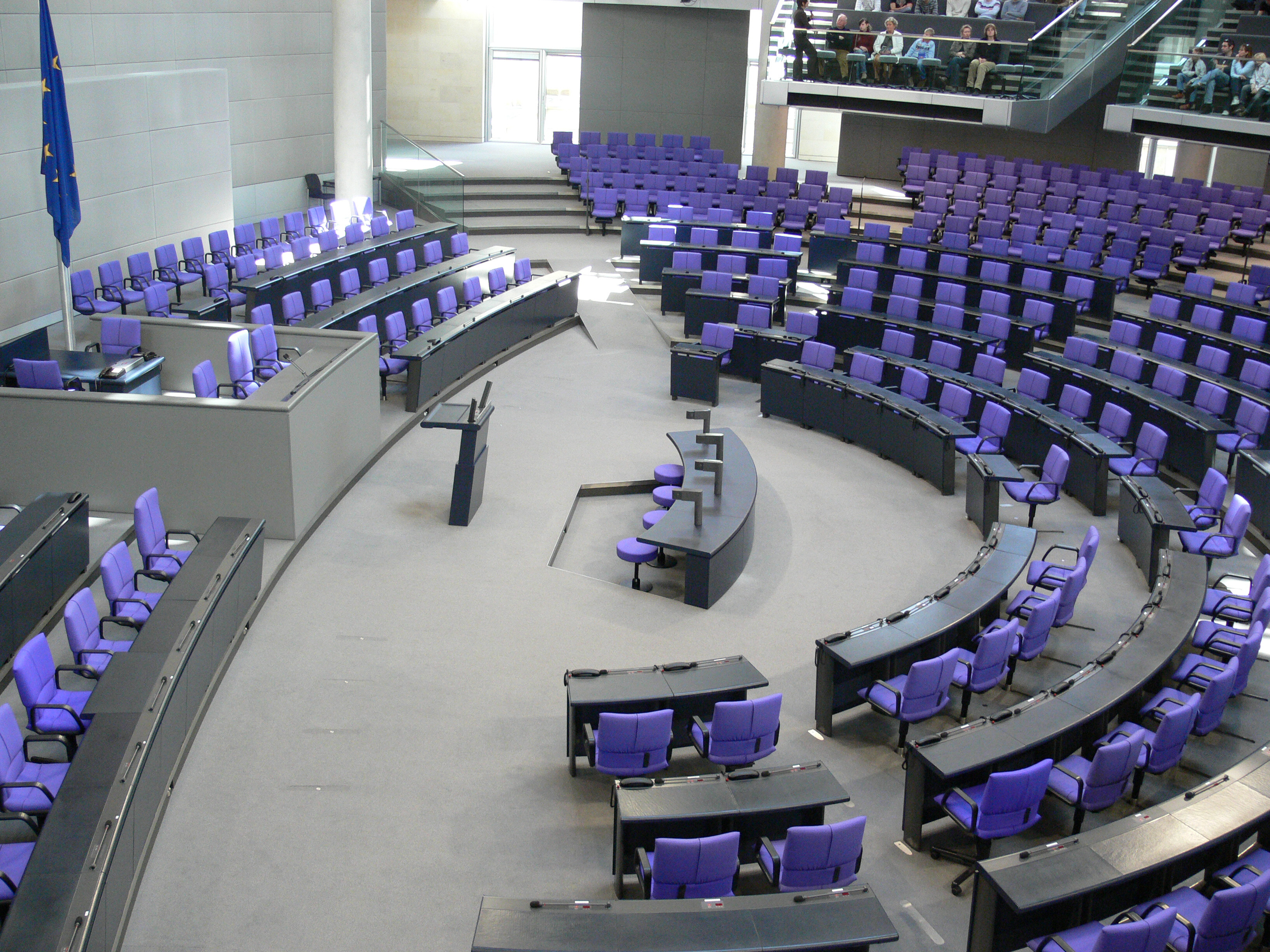
- Members: 736

This is a list of members of the 16th Bundestag – the lower house of parliament of the Federal Republic of Germany, whose members were in office from 18 October 2005 until 27 October 2009.

== Summary ==
This summary includes changes in the numbers of the five caucuses (CDU/CSU, SPD, FDP, The Left, Greens):

Time	Reason of change	CDU/CSU	SPD	FDP	Left	Greens	Others	Total number
18 October 2005	First meeting	226	222	61	54	51	0	614
13 February 2006	Gert Winkelmeier leaves the Left caucus and becomes unaffiliated	226	222	61	53	51	1	614
15 December 2006	Henry Nitzsche leaves the CDU/CSU caucus and becomes unaffiliated	225	222	61	53	51	2	614
1 June 2007	Matthias Wissmann resigns; his seat is vacated permanently because it is an overhang seat	224	222	61	53	51	2	613
25 February 2008	Johann-Henrich Krummacher dies; his seat is vacated permanently because it is an overhang seat	223	222	61	53	51	2	612
20 June 2009	Jörg Tauss leaves the SPD caucus and becomes unaffiliated. He joined the Pirate Party Germany.	223	221	61	53	51	3	612
14 July 2009	Peter Jahr resigns; his seat is vacated permanently because it is an overhang seat	222	221	61	53	51	3	611

== Members ==
State	No.	Constituency	Member	Party
Schleswig-Holstein	1	Flensburg – Schleswig	Wolfgang Wodarg	SPD
Schleswig-Holstein	2	Nordfriesland – Dithmarschen-Nord	Ingbert Liebing	CDU
Schleswig-Holstein	3	Steinburg – Dithmarschen-Süd	Rolf Koschorrek	CDU
Schleswig-Holstein	4	Rendsburg-Eckernförde	Otto Bernhardt	CDU
Schleswig-Holstein	5	Kiel	Hans-Peter Bartels	SPD
Schleswig-Holstein	6	Plön – Neumünster	Michael Bürsch	SPD
Schleswig-Holstein	7	Pinneberg	Ole Schröder	CDU
Schleswig-Holstein	8	Segeberg – Stormarn-Nord	Gero Storjohann	CDU
Schleswig-Holstein	9	Ostholstein	Bettina Hagedorn	SPD
Schleswig-Holstein	10	Herzogtum Lauenburg – Stormarn-Süd	Carl von Bismarck (Note: Carl von Bismarck resigned on 10 December 2007.)	CDU
Schleswig-Holstein	11	Lübeck	Gabriele Hiller-Ohm	SPD
Schleswig-Holstein	List		Sönke Rix	SPD
Schleswig-Holstein	List		Ernst Dieter Rossmann	SPD
Schleswig-Holstein	List		Jörn Thießen	SPD
Schleswig-Holstein	List		Franz Thönnes	SPD
Schleswig-Holstein	List		Wolfgang Börnsen	CDU
Schleswig-Holstein	List		Anke Eymer	CDU
Schleswig-Holstein	List		Helmut Lamp (Note: Helmut Lamp took office on 20 December 2007, to succeed Carl von Bismarck.)	SPD
Schleswig-Holstein	List		Christel Happach-Kasan	FDP
Schleswig-Holstein	List		Jürgen Koppelin	FDP
Schleswig-Holstein	List		Grietje Staffelt	Greens
Schleswig-Holstein	List		Rainder Steenblock	Greens
Schleswig-Holstein	List		Lutz Heilmann	Linke
Mecklenburg-Vorpommern	12	Wismar – Nordwestmecklenburg – Parchim	Iris Hoffmann	SPD
Mecklenburg-Vorpommern	13	Schwerin – Ludwigslust	Hans-Joachim Hacker	SPD
Mecklenburg-Vorpommern	14	Rostock	Christian Kleiminger	SPD
Mecklenburg-Vorpommern	15	Stralsund – Nordvorpommern – Rügen	Angela Merkel	CDU
Mecklenburg-Vorpommern	16	Greifswald – Demmin – Ostvorpommern	Ulrich Adam	CDU
Mecklenburg-Vorpommern	17	Bad Doberan – Güstrow – Müritz	Dirk Manzewski	SPD
Mecklenburg-Vorpommern	18	Neubrandenburg – Mecklenburg-Strelitz – Uecker-Randow	Susanne Jaffke	CDU
Mecklenburg-Vorpommern	List		Dietmar Bartsch	Linke
Mecklenburg-Vorpommern	List		Heidrun Bluhm	Linke
Mecklenburg-Vorpommern	List		Martina Bunge	Linke
Mecklenburg-Vorpommern	List		Eckhardt Rehberg	CDU
Mecklenburg-Vorpommern	List		Christian Ahrendt	FDP
Mecklenburg-Vorpommern	List		Harald Terpe	Greens
Hamburg	19	Hamburg-Mitte	Johannes Kahrs	SPD
Hamburg	20	Hamburg-Altona	Olaf Scholz	SPD
Hamburg	21	Hamburg-Eimsbüttel	Niels Annen	SPD
Hamburg	22	Hamburg-Nord	Christian Carstensen	SPD
Hamburg	23	Hamburg-Wandsbek	Ortwin Runde	SPD
Hamburg	24	Hamburg-Bergedorf – Harburg	Hans-Ulrich Klose	SPD
Hamburg	List		Antje Blumenthal	CDU
Hamburg	List		Dirk Fischer	CDU
Hamburg	List		Jürgen Klimke	CDU
Hamburg	List		Marcus Weinberg	CDU
Hamburg	List		Anja Hajduk (Note: Anja Hajduk resigned on 8 May 2008.)	Greens
Hamburg	List		Krista Sager	Greens
Hamburg	List		Manuel Sarrazin (Note: Manuel Sarrazin took office on 13 May 2008, to succeed Anja Hajduk.)	Greens
Hamburg	List		Burkhardt Müller-Sönksen	FDP
Hamburg	List		Norman Paech	Linke
Lower Saxony	25	Aurich – Emden	Garrelt Duin	SPD
Lower Saxony	26	Unterems	Gitta Connemann	CDU
Lower Saxony	27	Friesland – Wilhelmshaven	Karin Evers-Meyer	SPD
Lower Saxony	28	Oldenburg – Ammerland	Gesine Multhaupt	SPD
Lower Saxony	29	Delmenhorst – Wesermarsch – Oldenburg-Land	Holger Ortel	SPD
Lower Saxony	30	Cuxhaven – Osterholz	Annette Faße	SPD
Lower Saxony	31	Stade – Cuxhaven	Margrit Wetzel	SPD
Lower Saxony	32	Mittelems	Hermann Kues	CDU
Lower Saxony	33	Cloppenburg – Vechta	Franz-Josef Holzenkamp	CDU
Lower Saxony	34	Diepholz – Nienburg I	Rolf Kramer	SPD
Lower Saxony	35	Rotenburg – Verden	Joachim Stünker	SPD
Lower Saxony	36	Soltau-Fallingbostel – Winsen L.	Monika Griefahn	SPD
Lower Saxony	37	Lüchow-Dannenberg – Lüneburg	Hedi Wegener	SPD
Lower Saxony	38	Osnabrück-Land	Georg Schirmbeck	CDU
Lower Saxony	39	Stadt Osnabrück	Martin Schwanholz	SPD
Lower Saxony	40	Nienburg II – Schaumburg	Sebastian Edathy	SPD
Lower Saxony	41	Stadt Hannover I	Gerd Andres	SPD
Lower Saxony	42	Stadt Hannover II	Edelgard Bulmahn	SPD
Lower Saxony	43	Hannover-Land I	Caren Marks	SPD
Lower Saxony	44	Celle – Uelzen	Peter Struck	SPD
Lower Saxony	45	Gifhorn – Peine	Hubertus Heil	SPD
Lower Saxony	46	Hameln-Pyrmont – Holzminden	Gabriele Lösekrug-Möller	SPD
Lower Saxony	47	Hannover-Land II	Matthias Miersch	SPD
Lower Saxony	48	Hildesheim	Bernhard Brinkmann	SPD
Lower Saxony	49	Salzgitter – Wolfenbüttel	Sigmar Gabriel	SPD
Lower Saxony	50	Braunschweig	Carola Reimann	SPD
Lower Saxony	51	Helmstedt – Wolfsburg	Hans-Jürgen Uhl (Note: Hans-Jürgen Uhl resigned on 1 June 2007.)	SPD
Lower Saxony	52	Goslar – Northeim – Osterode	Wilhelm Priesmeier	SPD
Lower Saxony	53	Göttingen	Thomas Oppermann	SPD
Lower Saxony	List		Monika Brüning	CDU
Lower Saxony	List		Hans Georg Faust	CDU
Lower Saxony	List		Enak Ferlemann	CDU
Lower Saxony	List		Hartwig Fischer	CDU
Lower Saxony	List		Maria Flachsbarth	CDU
Lower Saxony	List		Jochen-Konrad Fromme	CDU
Lower Saxony	List		Reinhard Grindel	CDU
Lower Saxony	List		Michael Grosse-Brömer	CDU
Lower Saxony	List		Hans-Werner Kammer	CDU
Lower Saxony	List		Eckart von Klaeden	CDU
Lower Saxony	List		Thomas Kossendey	CDU
Lower Saxony	List		Martina Krogmann	CDU
Lower Saxony	List		Eva Möllring	CDU
Lower Saxony	List		Carsten Müller	CDU
Lower Saxony	List		Henning Otte	CDU
Lower Saxony	List		Rita Pawelski	CDU
Lower Saxony	List		Friedbert Pflüger (Note: Friedbert Pflüger resigned on 25 November 2006.)	CDU
Lower Saxony	List		Hans Peter Thul (Note: Hans Peter Thul took office on 25 November 2006, to succeed Friedbert Pflüger.)	CDU
Lower Saxony	List		Angelika Brunkhorst	FDP
Lower Saxony	List		Patrick Döring	FDP
Lower Saxony	List		Hans-Michael Goldmann	FDP
Lower Saxony	List		Ina Lenke	FDP
Lower Saxony	List		Carl-Ludwig Thiele	FDP
Lower Saxony	List		Claudia Winterstein	FDP
Lower Saxony	List		Thea Dückert	Greens
Lower Saxony	List		Thilo Hoppe	Greens
Lower Saxony	List		Brigitte Pothmer	Greens
Lower Saxony	List		Silke Stokar von Neuforn	Greens
Lower Saxony	List		Jürgen Trittin	Greens
Lower Saxony	List		Diether Dehm	Linke
Lower Saxony	List		Dorothée Menzner	Linke
Lower Saxony	List		Herbert Schui	Linke
Lower Saxony	List		Gabriele Groneberg	SPD
Lower Saxony	List		Gerhard Schröder (Note: Gerhard Schröder resigned on 24 November 2005.)	SPD
Lower Saxony	List		Clemens Bollen (Note: Clemens Bollen took office on 29 November 2005, to succeed Gerhard Schröder.)	SPD
Lower Saxony	List		Dieter Steinecke (Note: Dieter Steinecke took office on 2 June 2007, to succeed Hans-Jürgen Uhl.)	SPD
Bremen	54	Bremen I	Volker Kröning	SPD
Bremen	55	Bremen II – Bremerhaven	Uwe Beckmeyer	SPD
Bremen	List		Bernd Neumann	CDU
Bremen	List		Marieluise Beck	Greens
Brandenburg	56	Prignitz – Ostprignitz-Ruppin – Havelland I	Ernst Bahr	SPD
Brandenburg	57	Uckermark – Barnim I	Markus Meckel	SPD
Brandenburg	58	Oberhavel – Havelland II	Angelika Krüger-Leißner	SPD
Brandenburg	59	Märkisch-Oderland – Barnim II	Petra Bierwirth	SPD
Brandenburg	60	Brandenburg an der Havel – Potsdam-Mittelmark I – Havelland III – Teltow-Fläming I	Margrit Spielmann	SPD
Brandenburg	61	Potsdam – Potsdam-Mittelmark II – Teltow-Fläming II	Andrea Wicklein	SPD
Brandenburg	62	Dahme-Spreewald – Teltow-Fläming III – Oberspreewald-Lausitz I	Peter Danckert	SPD
Brandenburg	63	Frankfurt (Oder) – Oder-Spree	Jörg Vogelsänger	SPD
Brandenburg	64	Cottbus – Spree-Neiße	Steffen Reiche	SPD
Brandenburg	65	Elbe-Elster – Oberspreewald-Lausitz II	Stephan Hilsberg	SPD
Brandenburg	List		Lothar Bisky (Note: Lothar Bisky resigned on 14 July 2009.)	Linke
Brandenburg	List		Dagmar Enkelmann	Linke
Brandenburg	List		Diana Golze	Linke
Brandenburg	List		Wolfgang Nešković	Linke
Brandenburg	List		Kirsten Tackmann	Linke
Brandenburg	List		Steffen Hultsch (Note: Steffen Hultsch took office on 14 July 2009, to succeed Lothar Bisky.)	Linke
Brandenburg	List		Jens Koeppen	CDU
Brandenburg	List		Katherina Reiche	CDU
Brandenburg	List		Michael Stübgen	CDU
Brandenburg	List		Andrea Voßhoff	CDU
Brandenburg	List		Heinz Lanfermann	FDP
Brandenburg	List		Cornelia Behm	Greens
Saxony-Anhalt	66	Altmark	Marko Mühlstein	SPD
Saxony-Anhalt	67	Elbe-Havel-Gebiet	Waltraud Wolff	SPD
Saxony-Anhalt	68	Harz	Andreas Steppuhn	SPD
Saxony-Anhalt	69	Magdeburg	Uwe Küster	SPD
Saxony-Anhalt	70	Börde	Ulrich Kasparick	SPD
Saxony-Anhalt	71	Anhalt	Engelbert Wistuba	SPD
Saxony-Anhalt	72	Bernburg – Bitterfeld – Saalkreis	Klaas Hübner	SPD
Saxony-Anhalt	73	Halle	Christel Riemann-Hanewinckel	SPD
Saxony-Anhalt	74	Burgenland	Maik Reichel	SPD
Saxony-Anhalt	75	Mansfelder Land	Silvia Schmidt	SPD
Saxony-Anhalt	List		Roland Claus	Linke
Saxony-Anhalt	List		Jan Korte	Linke
Saxony-Anhalt	List		Katrin Kunert	Linke
Saxony-Anhalt	List		Elke Reinke	Linke
Saxony-Anhalt	List		Petra Sitte	Linke
Saxony-Anhalt	List		Christoph Bergner	CDU
Saxony-Anhalt	List		Uda Heller	CDU
Saxony-Anhalt	List		Bernd Heynemann	CDU
Saxony-Anhalt	List		Hans-Heinrich Jordan	CDU
Saxony-Anhalt	List		Ulrich Petzold	CDU
Saxony-Anhalt	List		Jens Ackermann	FDP
Saxony-Anhalt	List		Cornelia Pieper	FDP
Saxony-Anhalt	List		Undine Kurth	Greens
Berlin	76	Berlin-Mitte	Jörg-Otto Spiller	SPD
Berlin	77	Berlin-Pankow	Wolfgang Thierse	SPD
Berlin	78	Berlin-Reinickendorf	Detlef Dzembritzki	SPD
Berlin	79	Berlin-Spandau – Charlottenburg North	Swen Schulz	SPD
Berlin	80	Berlin-Steglitz-Zehlendorf	Karl-Georg Wellmann	CDU
Berlin	81	Berlin-Charlottenburg-Wilmersdorf	Petra Merkel	SPD
Berlin	82	Berlin-Tempelhof-Schöneberg	Mechthild Rawert	SPD
Berlin	83	Berlin-Neukölln	Ditmar Staffelt (Note: Ditmar Staffelt resigned on 11 January 2009.)	SPD
Berlin	84	Berlin-Friedrichshain-Kreuzberg – Prenzlauer Berg East	Hans-Christian Ströbele	Greens
Berlin	85	Berlin-Treptow – Köpenick	Gregor Gysi	Linke
Berlin	86	Berlin-Marzahn – Hellersdorf	Petra Pau	Linke
Berlin	87	Berlin-Lichtenberg	Gesine Lötzsch	Linke
Berlin	List		Monika Grütters	CDU
Berlin	List		Peter Rzepka	CDU
Berlin	List		Ingo Schmitt	CDU
Berlin	List		Kai Wegner	CDU
Berlin	List		Renate Künast	Greens
Berlin	List		Wolfgang Wieland	Greens
Berlin	List		Hellmut Königshaus	FDP
Berlin	List		Markus Löning	FDP
Berlin	List		Klaus Uwe Benneter	SPD
Berlin	List		Eva Högl (Note: Eva Högl took office on 12 January 2009, to succeed Ditmar Staffelt.)	SPD
Berlin	List		Hakkı Keskin	Linke
North Rhine-Westphalia	88	Aachen	Ulla Schmidt	SPD
North Rhine-Westphalia	89	Kreis Aachen	Achim Großmann	SPD
North Rhine-Westphalia	90	Heinsberg	Leo Dautzenberg	CDU
North Rhine-Westphalia	91	Düren	Thomas Rachel	CDU
North Rhine-Westphalia	92	Erftkreis I	Gabriele Frechen	SPD
North Rhine-Westphalia	93	Euskirchen – Erftkreis II	Wolf Bauer	CDU
North Rhine-Westphalia	94	Cologne I	Martin Dörmann	SPD
North Rhine-Westphalia	95	Cologne II	Lale Akgün	SPD
North Rhine-Westphalia	96	Cologne III	Rolf Mützenich	SPD
North Rhine-Westphalia	97	Bonn	Ulrich Kelber	SPD
North Rhine-Westphalia	98	Rhein-Sieg-Kreis I	Elisabeth Winkelmeier-Becker	CDU
North Rhine-Westphalia	99	Rhein-Sieg-Kreis II	Norbert Röttgen	CDU
North Rhine-Westphalia	100	Oberbergischer Kreis	Klaus-Peter Flosbach	CDU
North Rhine-Westphalia	101	Rheinisch-Bergischer Kreis	Wolfgang Bosbach	CDU
North Rhine-Westphalia	102	Leverkusen – Cologne IV	Karl Lauterbach	SPD
North Rhine-Westphalia	103	Wuppertal I	Manfred Zöllmer	SPD
North Rhine-Westphalia	104	Solingen – Remscheid – Wuppertal II	Jürgen Kucharczyk	SPD
North Rhine-Westphalia	105	Mettmann I	Michaela Noll	CDU
North Rhine-Westphalia	106	Mettmann II	Kerstin Griese	SPD
North Rhine-Westphalia	107	Düsseldorf I	Hildegard Müller	CDU
North Rhine-Westphalia	108	Düsseldorf II	Karin Kortmann	SPD
North Rhine-Westphalia	109	Neuss I	Hermann Gröhe	CDU
North Rhine-Westphalia	110	Mönchengladbach	Günter Krings	CDU
North Rhine-Westphalia	111	Krefeld I – Neuss II	Willy Wimmer	CDU
North Rhine-Westphalia	112	Viersen	Uwe Schummer	CDU
North Rhine-Westphalia	113	Kleve	Ronald Pofalla	CDU
North Rhine-Westphalia	114	Wesel I	Hans-Ulrich Krüger	SPD
North Rhine-Westphalia	115	Krefeld II – Wesel II	Siegmund Ehrmann	SPD
North Rhine-Westphalia	116	Duisburg I	Petra Weis	SPD
North Rhine-Westphalia	117	Duisburg II	Johannes Pflug	SPD
North Rhine-Westphalia	118	Oberhausen – Wesel III	Wolfgang Grotthaus	SPD
North Rhine-Westphalia	119	Mülheim – Essen I	Anton Schaaf	SPD
North Rhine-Westphalia	120	Essen II	Rolf Hempelmann	SPD
North Rhine-Westphalia	121	Essen III	Petra Hinz	SPD
North Rhine-Westphalia	122	Recklinghausen I	Frank Schwabe	SPD
North Rhine-Westphalia	123	Recklinghausen II	Waltraud Lehn	SPD
North Rhine-Westphalia	124	Gelsenkirchen	Joachim Poß	SPD
North Rhine-Westphalia	125	Steinfurt I – Borken I	Jens Spahn	CDU
North Rhine-Westphalia	126	Bottrop – Recklinghausen III	Dieter Grasedieck	SPD
North Rhine-Westphalia	127	Borken II	Johannes Röring	CDU
North Rhine-Westphalia	128	Coesfeld – Steinfurt II	Karl Schiewerling	CDU
North Rhine-Westphalia	129	Steinfurt III	Reinhold Hemker	SPD
North Rhine-Westphalia	130	Münster	Christoph Strässer	SPD
North Rhine-Westphalia	131	Warendorf	Peter Paziorek (Note: Peter Paziorek resigned on 1 September 2007.)	CDU
North Rhine-Westphalia	132	Gütersloh	Hubert Deittert	CDU
North Rhine-Westphalia	133	Bielefeld	Rainer Wend (Note: Rainer Wend resigned on 1 April 2009.)	SPD
North Rhine-Westphalia	134	Herford – Minden-Lübbecke II	Wolfgang Spanier	SPD
North Rhine-Westphalia	135	Minden-Lübbecke I	Lothar Ibrügger	SPD
North Rhine-Westphalia	136	Lippe I	Dirk Becker	SPD
North Rhine-Westphalia	137	Höxter – Lippe II	Jürgen Herrmann	CDU
North Rhine-Westphalia	138	Paderborn	Gerhard Wächter	CDU
North Rhine-Westphalia	139	Hagen – Ennepe-Ruhr-Kreis I	René Röspel	SPD
North Rhine-Westphalia	140	Ennepe-Ruhr-Kreis II	Christel Humme	SPD
North Rhine-Westphalia	141	Bochum I	Axel Schäfer	SPD
North Rhine-Westphalia	142	Herne – Bochum II	Gerd Bollmann	SPD
North Rhine-Westphalia	143	Dortmund I	Marco Bülow	SPD
North Rhine-Westphalia	144	Dortmund II	Ulla Burchardt	SPD
North Rhine-Westphalia	145	Unna I	Rolf Stöckel	SPD
North Rhine-Westphalia	146	Hamm – Unna II	Dieter Wiefelspütz	SPD
North Rhine-Westphalia	147	Soest	Bernhard Schulte-Drüggelte	CDU
North Rhine-Westphalia	148	Hochsauerlandkreis	Friedrich Merz	CDU
North Rhine-Westphalia	149	Siegen-Wittgenstein	Willi Brase	SPD
North Rhine-Westphalia	150	Olpe – Märkischer Kreis I	Hartmut Schauerte	CDU
North Rhine-Westphalia	151	Märkischer Kreis II	Dagmar Freitag	SPD
North Rhine-Westphalia	List		Jochen Borchert	CDU
North Rhine-Westphalia	List		Helmut Brandt	CDU
North Rhine-Westphalia	List		Ralf Brauksiepe	CDU
North Rhine-Westphalia	List		Marie-Luise Dött	CDU
North Rhine-Westphalia	List		Ilse Falk	CDU
North Rhine-Westphalia	List		Ingrid Fischbach	CDU
North Rhine-Westphalia	List		Erich G. Fritz	CDU
North Rhine-Westphalia	List		Reinhard Göhner (Note: Reinhard Göhner resigned on 7 July 2007.)	CDU
North Rhine-Westphalia	List		Ursula Heinen-Esser	CDU
North Rhine-Westphalia	List		Peter Hintze	CDU
North Rhine-Westphalia	List		Hubert Hüppe	CDU
North Rhine-Westphalia	List		Steffen Kampeter	CDU
North Rhine-Westphalia	List		Norbert Königshofen	CDU
North Rhine-Westphalia	List		Norbert Lammert	CDU
North Rhine-Westphalia	List		Wolfgang Meckelburg	CDU
North Rhine-Westphalia	List		Laurenz Meyer	CDU
North Rhine-Westphalia	List		Philipp Mißfelder	CDU
North Rhine-Westphalia	List		Beatrix Philipp	CDU
North Rhine-Westphalia	List		Ruprecht Polenz	CDU
North Rhine-Westphalia	List		Andreas Schmidt	CDU
North Rhine-Westphalia	List		Lena Strothmann	CDU
North Rhine-Westphalia	List		Willi Zylajew	CDU
North Rhine-Westphalia	List		Cajus Julius Caesar (Note: Cajus Julius Caesar took office on 9 July 2007, to succeed Reinhard Göhner.)	CDU
North Rhine-Westphalia	List		Stephan Eisel (Note: Stephan Eisel took office on 3 September 2007, to succeed Peter Paziorek.)	CDU
North Rhine-Westphalia	List		Thomas Mahlberg (Note: Thomas Mahlberg took office on 7 October 2008, to succeed Hildegard Müller.)	CDU
North Rhine-Westphalia	List		Ingrid Arndt-Brauer	SPD
North Rhine-Westphalia	List		Ute Berg	SPD
North Rhine-Westphalia	List		Kurt Bodewig	SPD
North Rhine-Westphalia	List		Klaus Brandner	SPD
North Rhine-Westphalia	List		Barbara Hendricks	SPD
North Rhine-Westphalia	List		Eike Hovermann	SPD
North Rhine-Westphalia	List		Helga Kühn-Mengel	SPD
North Rhine-Westphalia	List		Ulrike Merten	SPD
North Rhine-Westphalia	List		Michael Müller	SPD
North Rhine-Westphalia	List		Franz Müntefering	SPD
North Rhine-Westphalia	List		Bernd Scheelen	SPD
North Rhine-Westphalia	List		Dagmar Schmidt (Note: Dagmar Schmidt died on 9 November 2005.)	SPD
North Rhine-Westphalia	List		Reinhard Schultz	SPD
North Rhine-Westphalia	List		Angelica Schwall-Düren	SPD
North Rhine-Westphalia	List		Christoph Pries (Note: Christoph Pries took office on 16 November 2005, to succeed Dagmar Schmidt.)	SPD
North Rhine-Westphalia	List		Hildegard Wester (Note: Hildegard Wester took office on 1 April 2009, to succeed Rainer Wend.)	SPD
North Rhine-Westphalia	List		Daniel Bahr	FDP
North Rhine-Westphalia	List		Jörg van Essen	FDP
North Rhine-Westphalia	List		Ulrike Flach	FDP
North Rhine-Westphalia	List		Otto Fricke	FDP
North Rhine-Westphalia	List		Paul Friedhoff	FDP
North Rhine-Westphalia	List		Werner Hoyer	FDP
North Rhine-Westphalia	List		Michael Kauch	FDP
North Rhine-Westphalia	List		Gudrun Kopp	FDP
North Rhine-Westphalia	List		Detlef Parr	FDP
North Rhine-Westphalia	List		Gisela Piltz	FDP
North Rhine-Westphalia	List		Frank Schäffler	FDP
North Rhine-Westphalia	List		Konrad Schily	FDP
North Rhine-Westphalia	List		Guido Westerwelle	FDP
North Rhine-Westphalia	List		Volker Beck	Greens
North Rhine-Westphalia	List		Kai Gehring	Greens
North Rhine-Westphalia	List		Britta Haßelmann	Greens
North Rhine-Westphalia	List		Bärbel Höhn	Greens
North Rhine-Westphalia	List		Ute Koczy	Greens
North Rhine-Westphalia	List		Markus Kurth	Greens
North Rhine-Westphalia	List		Reinhard Loske (Note: Reinhard Loske resigned on 1 September 2007.)	Greens
North Rhine-Westphalia	List		Kerstin Müller	Greens
North Rhine-Westphalia	List		Winfried Nachtwei	Greens
North Rhine-Westphalia	List		Irmingard Schewe-Gerigk	Greens
North Rhine-Westphalia	List		Bettina Herlitzius (Note: Bettina Herlitzius took office on 3 September 2007, to succeed Reinhard Loske.)	Greens
North Rhine-Westphalia	List		Hüseyin Kenan Aydın	Linke
North Rhine-Westphalia	List		Sevim Dağdelen	Linke
North Rhine-Westphalia	List		Inge Höger	Linke
North Rhine-Westphalia	List		Ulla Jelpke	Linke
North Rhine-Westphalia	List		Oskar Lafontaine	Linke
North Rhine-Westphalia	List		Ulla Lötzer	Linke
North Rhine-Westphalia	List		Paul Schäfer	Linke
Saxony	152	Delitzsch – Torgau-Oschatz – Riesa	Manfred Kolbe	CDU
Saxony	153	Leipzig I	Rainer Fornahl	SPD
Saxony	154	Leipzig II	Gunter Weißgerber	SPD
Saxony	155	Leipziger Land – Muldentalkreis	Katharina Landgraf	CDU
Saxony	156	Kamenz – Hoyerswerda – Großenhain	Henry Nitzsche	CDU
Saxony	157	Löbau-Zittau – Görlitz – Niesky	Michael Kretschmer	CDU
Saxony	158	Bautzen – Weißwasser	Maria Michalk	CDU
Saxony	159	Sächsische Schweiz – Weißeritzkreis	Klaus Brähmig	CDU
Saxony	160	Dresden I	Andreas Lämmel	CDU
Saxony	161	Dresden II – Meißen I	Arnold Vaatz	CDU
Saxony	162	Freiberg – Mittlerer Erzgebirgskreis	Veronika Bellmann	CDU
Saxony	163	Döbeln – Mittweida – Meißen II	Peter Jahr (Note: Peter Jahr resigned on 14 July 2009.)	CDU
Saxony	164	Chemnitz	Detlef Müller	SPD
Saxony	165	Chemnitzer Land – Stollberg	Marco Wanderwitz	CDU
Saxony	166	Annaberg – Aue-Schwarzenberg	Günter Baumann	CDU
Saxony	167	Zwickauer Land – Zwickau	Michael Luther	CDU
Saxony	168	Vogtland – Plauen	Robert Hochbaum	CDU
Saxony	List		Barbara Höll	Linke
Saxony	List		Katja Kipping	Linke
Saxony	List		Monika Knoche	Linke
Saxony	List		Michael Leutert	Linke
Saxony	List		Ilja Seifert	Linke
Saxony	List		Axel Troost	Linke
Saxony	List		Jörn Wunderlich	Linke
Saxony	List		Sabine Zimmermann	Linke
Saxony	List		Wolfgang Gunkel	SPD
Saxony	List		Rolf Schwanitz	SPD
Saxony	List		Simone Violka	SPD
Saxony	List		Marlies Volkmer	SPD
Saxony	List		Andreas Weigel	SPD
Saxony	List		Joachim Günther	FDP
Saxony	List		Heinz-Peter Haustein	FDP
Saxony	List		Jan Mücke	FDP
Saxony	List		Christoph Waitz	FDP
Saxony	List		Peter Hettlich	Greens
Saxony	List		Monika Lazar	Greens
Hesse	169	Waldeck	Alfred Hartenbach	SPD
Hesse	170	Kassel	Hans Eichel	SPD
Hesse	171	Werra-Meißner – Hersfeld-Rotenburg	Michael Roth	SPD
Hesse	172	Schwalm-Eder	Gerd Höfer	SPD
Hesse	173	Marburg	Sören Bartol	SPD
Hesse	174	Lahn-Dill	Helga Lopez	SPD
Hesse	175	Gießen	Rüdiger Veit	SPD
Hesse	176	Fulda	Michael Brand	CDU
Hesse	177	Hochtaunus	Holger Haibach	CDU
Hesse	178	Wetterau	Nina Hauer	SPD
Hesse	179	Rheingau-Taunus – Limburg	Klaus-Peter Willsch	CDU
Hesse	180	Wiesbaden	Heidemarie Wieczorek-Zeul	SPD
Hesse	181	Hanau	Sascha Raabe	SPD
Hesse	182	Main-Taunus	Heinz Riesenhuber	CDU
Hesse	183	Frankfurt am Main I	Gregor Amann	SPD
Hesse	184	Frankfurt am Main II	Erika Steinbach	CDU
Hesse	185	Groß-Gerau	Gerold Reichenbach	SPD
Hesse	186	Offenbach	Klaus Lippold	CDU
Hesse	187	Darmstadt	Brigitte Zypries	SPD
Hesse	188	Odenwald	Patricia Lips	CDU
Hesse	189	Bergstraße	Michael Meister	CDU
Hesse	List		Jürgen Gehb	CDU
Hesse	List		Franz Josef Jung	CDU
Hesse	List		Kristina Schröder	CDU
Hesse	List		Sibylle Pfeiffer	CDU
Hesse	List		Bernd Siebert	CDU
Hesse	List		Andreas Storm	CDU
Hesse	List		Gerald Weiß	CDU
Hesse	List		Mechthild Dyckmans	FDP
Hesse	List		Wolfgang Gerhardt	FDP
Hesse	List		Heinrich Kolb	FDP
Hesse	List		Hans-Joachim Otto	FDP
Hesse	List		Hermann Otto Solms	FDP
Hesse	List		Matthias Berninger (Note: Matthias Berninger resigned on 20 February 2007.)	Greens
Hesse	List		Joschka Fischer (Note: Joschka Fischer resigned on 1 September 2006.)	Greens
Hesse	List		Priska Hinz	Greens
Hesse	List		Anna Lührmann	Greens
Hesse	List		Margareta Wolf	Greens
Hesse	List		Omid Nouripour (Note: Omid Nouripour took office on 1 September 2006, to succeed Joschka Fischer.)	Greens
Hesse	List		Nicole Maisch (Note: Nicole Maisch took office on 20 February 2007, to succeed Matthias Berninger.)	Greens
Hesse	List		Wolfgang Strengmann-Kuhn (Note: Wolfgang Strengmann-Kuhn took office on 4 January 2008, to succeed Margareta Wolf.)	Greens
Hesse	List		Christine Lambrecht	SPD
Hesse	List		Frank Schmidt	SPD
Hesse	List		Uta Zapf	SPD
Hesse	List		Werner Dreibus	Linke
Hesse	List		Wolfgang Gehrcke	Linke
Thuringia	190	Eichsfeld – Nordhausen – Unstrut-Hainich-Kreis I	Manfred Grund	CDU
Thuringia	191	Eisenach – Wartburgkreis – Unstrut-Hainich-Kreis II	Ernst Kranz	SPD
Thuringia	192	Kyffhäuserkreis – Sömmerda – Weimarer Land I	Peter Albach	CDU
Thuringia	193	Gotha – Ilm-Kreis	Petra Heß	SPD
Thuringia	194	Erfurt – Weimar – Weimarer Land II	Carsten Schneider	SPD
Thuringia	195	Gera – Jena – Saale-Holzland-Kreis	Volker Blumentritt	SPD
Thuringia	196	Greiz – Altenburger Land	Volkmar Vogel	CDU
Thuringia	197	Sonneberg – Saalfeld-Rudolstadt – Saale-Orla-Kreis	Gerhard Botz	SPD
Thuringia	198	Suhl – Schmalkalden-Meiningen – Hildburghausen	Iris Gleicke	SPD
Thuringia	List		Cornelia Hirsch	Linke
Thuringia	List		Luc Jochimsen	Linke
Thuringia	List		Kersten Naumann	Linke
Thuringia	List		Bodo Ramelow (Note: Bodo Ramelow resigned on 28 September 2009.)	Linke
Thuringia	List		Frank Spieth	Linke
Thuringia	List		Frank Tempel (Note: Frank Tempel took office on 29 September 2009, to succeed Bodo Ramelow.)	Linke
Thuringia	List		Bernward Müller (Note: Bernward Müller resigned on 9 May 2008.)	CDU
Thuringia	List		Antje Tillmann	CDU
Thuringia	List		Christian Hirte (Note: Christian Hirte took office on 15 May 2008, to succeed Bernward Müller.)	CDU
Thuringia	List		Uwe Barth (Note: Uwe Barth resigned on 28 September 2009.)	FDP
Thuringia	List		Patrick Kurth (Note: Patrick Kurth took office on 29 September 2009, to succeed Uwe Barth.)	FDP
Thuringia	List		Katrin Göring-Eckardt	Greens
Rhineland-Palatinate	199	Neuwied	Sabine Bätzing-Lichtenthäler	SPD
Rhineland-Palatinate	200	Ahrweiler	Wilhelm Josef Sebastian	CDU
Rhineland-Palatinate	201	Koblenz	Michael Fuchs	CDU
Rhineland-Palatinate	202	Mosel/Rhein-Hunsrück	Peter Bleser	CDU
Rhineland-Palatinate	203	Kreuznach	Julia Klöckner	CDU
Rhineland-Palatinate	204	Bitburg	Peter Rauen	CDU
Rhineland-Palatinate	205	Trier	Bernhard Kaster	CDU
Rhineland-Palatinate	206	Montabaur	Joachim Hörster	CDU
Rhineland-Palatinate	207	Mainz	Michael Hartmann	SPD
Rhineland-Palatinate	208	Worms	Klaus Hagemann	SPD
Rhineland-Palatinate	209	Ludwigshafen/Frankenthal	Doris Barnett	SPD
Rhineland-Palatinate	210	Neustadt – Speyer	Norbert Schindler	CDU
Rhineland-Palatinate	211	Kaiserslautern	Gustav Herzog	SPD
Rhineland-Palatinate	212	Pirmasens	Anita Schäfer	CDU
Rhineland-Palatinate	213	Südpfalz	Ralf Göbel (Note: Ralf Göbel resigned on 1 March 2009.)	CDU
Rhineland-Palatinate	List		Karl Diller	SPD
Rhineland-Palatinate	List		Fritz Rudolf Körper	SPD
Rhineland-Palatinate	List		Ursula Mogg	SPD
Rhineland-Palatinate	List		Andrea Nahles	SPD
Rhineland-Palatinate	List		Heinz Schmitt	SPD
Rhineland-Palatinate	List		Lydia Westrich	SPD
Rhineland-Palatinate	List		Rainer Brüderle	FDP
Rhineland-Palatinate	List		Edmund Geisen	FDP
Rhineland-Palatinate	List		Elke Hoff	FDP
Rhineland-Palatinate	List		Volker Wissing	FDP
Rhineland-Palatinate	List		Maria Böhmer	CDU
Rhineland-Palatinate	List		Ute Granold	CDU
Rhineland-Palatinate	List		Werner Wittlich (Note: Werner Wittlich took office on 1 March 2009, to succeed Ralf Göbel.)	CDU
Rhineland-Palatinate	List		Alexander Ulrich	Linke
Rhineland-Palatinate	List		Gert Winkelmeier	Linke
Rhineland-Palatinate	List		Ulrike Höfken	Greens
Rhineland-Palatinate	List		Josef Winkler	Greens
Bavaria	214	Altötting	Stephan Mayer	CSU
Bavaria	215	Erding – Ebersberg	Maximilian Lehmer	CSU
Bavaria	216	Freising	Franz Obermeier	CSU
Bavaria	217	Fürstenfeldbruck	Gerda Hasselfeldt	CSU
Bavaria	218	Ingolstadt	Horst Seehofer (Note: Horst Seehofer resigned on 4 November 2008.)	CSU
Bavaria	219	Munich North	Axel Berg	SPD
Bavaria	220	Munich East	Herbert Frankenhauser	CSU
Bavaria	221	Munich South	Peter Gauweiler	CSU
Bavaria	222	Munich West/Centre	Hans-Peter Uhl	CSU
Bavaria	223	Munich Land	Georg Fahrenschon (Note: Georg Fahrenschon resigned on 8 November 2007.)	CSU
Bavaria	224	Rosenheim	Daniela Ludwig	CSU
Bavaria	225	Starnberg	Ilse Aigner	CSU
Bavaria	226	Traunstein	Peter Ramsauer	CSU
Bavaria	227	Weilheim	Alexander Dobrindt	CSU
Bavaria	228	Deggendorf	Bartholomäus Kalb	CSU
Bavaria	229	Landshut	Wolfgang Götzer	CSU
Bavaria	230	Passau	Andreas Scheuer	CSU
Bavaria	231	Rottal-Inn	Max Straubinger	CSU
Bavaria	232	Straubing	Ernst Hinsken	CSU
Bavaria	233	Amberg	Alois Karl	CSU
Bavaria	234	Regensburg	Maria Eichhorn	CSU
Bavaria	235	Schwandorf	Klaus Hofbauer	CSU
Bavaria	236	Weiden	Albert Rupprecht	CSU
Bavaria	237	Bamberg	Thomas Silberhorn	CSU
Bavaria	238	Bayreuth	Hartmut Koschyk	CSU
Bavaria	239	Coburg	Hans Michelbach	CSU
Bavaria	240	Hof	Hans-Peter Friedrich	CSU
Bavaria	241	Kulmbach	Karl-Theodor zu Guttenberg	CSU
Bavaria	242	Ansbach	Josef Göppel	CSU
Bavaria	243	Erlangen	Stefan Müller	CSU
Bavaria	244	Fürth	Christian Schmidt	CSU
Bavaria	245	Nuremberg North	Dagmar Wöhrl	CSU
Bavaria	246	Nuremberg South	Renate Blank	CSU
Bavaria	247	Roth	Marlene Mortler	CSU
Bavaria	248	Aschaffenburg	Norbert Geis	CSU
Bavaria	249	Bad Kissingen	Eduard Lintner	CSU
Bavaria	250	Main-Spessart	Wolfgang Zöller	CSU
Bavaria	251	Schweinfurt	Michael Glos	CSU
Bavaria	252	Würzburg	Paul Lehrieder	CSU
Bavaria	253	Augsburg-Stadt	Christian Ruck	CSU
Bavaria	254	Augsburg-Land	Eduard Oswald	CSU
Bavaria	255	Donau-Ries	Hans Raidel	CSU
Bavaria	256	Neu-Ulm	Georg Nüßlein	CSU
Bavaria	257	Oberallgäu	Gerd Müller	CSU
Bavaria	258	Ostallgäu	Kurt Rossmanith	CSU
Bavaria	List		Klaus Barthel	SPD
Bavaria	List		Martin Burkert	SPD
Bavaria	List		Carl-Christian Dressel	SPD
Bavaria	List		Petra Ernstberger	SPD
Bavaria	List		Gabriele Fograscher	SPD
Bavaria	List		Günter Gloser	SPD
Bavaria	List		Angelika Graf	SPD
Bavaria	List		Frank Hofmann	SPD
Bavaria	List		Brunhilde Irber	SPD
Bavaria	List		Susanne Kastner	SPD
Bavaria	List		Bärbel Kofler	SPD
Bavaria	List		Walter Kolbow	SPD
Bavaria	List		Anette Kramme	SPD
Bavaria	List		Heinz Paula	SPD
Bavaria	List		Florian Pronold	SPD
Bavaria	List		Marlene Rupprecht	SPD
Bavaria	List		Marianne Schieder	SPD
Bavaria	List		Otto Schily	SPD
Bavaria	List		Renate Schmidt	SPD
Bavaria	List		Ewald Schurer	SPD
Bavaria	List		Ludwig Stiegler	SPD
Bavaria	List		Jella Teuchner	SPD
Bavaria	List		Heidemarie Wright	SPD
Bavaria	List		Horst Friedrich	FDP
Bavaria	List		Miriam Gruß	FDP
Bavaria	List		Sabine Leutheusser-Schnarrenberger	FDP
Bavaria	List		Horst Meierhofer	FDP
Bavaria	List		Jörg Rohde (Note: Jörg Rohde resigned on 31 October 2008.)	FDP
Bavaria	List		Marina Schuster	FDP
Bavaria	List		Max Stadler	FDP
Bavaria	List		Rainer Stinner	FDP
Bavaria	List		Martin Zeil (Note: Martin Zeil resigned on 31 October 2008.)	FDP
Bavaria	List		Erwin Lotter (Note: Erwin Lotter took office on 31 October 2008, to succeed Martin Zeil.)	FDP
Bavaria	List		Daniel Volk (Note: Daniel Volk took office on 31 October 2008, to succeed Jörg Rohde.)	FDP
Bavaria	List		Ekin Deligöz	Greens
Bavaria	List		Hans-Josef Fell	Greens
Bavaria	List		Anton Hofreiter	Greens
Bavaria	List		Jerzy Montag	Greens
Bavaria	List		Claudia Roth	Greens
Bavaria	List		Elisabeth Scharfenberg	Greens
Bavaria	List		Christine Scheel	Greens
Bavaria	List		Eva Bulling-Schröter	Linke
Bavaria	List		Klaus Ernst	Linke
Bavaria	List		Kornelia Möller	Linke
Bavaria	List		Günther Beckstein (Note: Günther Beckstein resigned on 23 November 2005.)	CSU
Bavaria	List		Edmund Stoiber (Note: Edmund Stoiber resigned on 8 November 2005.)	CSU
Bavaria	List		Johannes Singhammer (Note: Johannes Singhammer took office on 11 November 2005, to succeed Edmund Stoiber.)	CSU
Bavaria	List		Dorothee Bär (Note: Dorothee Bär took office on 23 November 2005, to succeed Günther Beckstein.)	CSU
Bavaria	List		Marion Seib (Note: Marion Seib took office on 8 November 2007, to succeed Georg Fahrenschon.)	CSU
Bavaria	List		Matthäus Strebl (Note: Matthäus Strebl took office on 4 November 2008, to succeed Horst Seehofer.)	CSU
Baden-Württemberg	259	Stuttgart I	Johann-Henrich Krummacher (Note: Johann-Henrich Krummacher died on 25 February 2008.)	CDU
Baden-Württemberg	260	Stuttgart II	Ute Kumpf	SPD
Baden-Württemberg	261	Böblingen	Clemens Binninger	CDU
Baden-Württemberg	262	Esslingen	Markus Grübel	CDU
Baden-Württemberg	263	Nürtingen	Michael Hennrich	CDU
Baden-Württemberg	264	Göppingen	Klaus Riegert	CDU
Baden-Württemberg	265	Waiblingen	Joachim Pfeiffer	CDU
Baden-Württemberg	266	Ludwigsburg	Matthias Wissmann (Note: Matthias Wissmann resigned on 1 June 2007.)	CDU
Baden-Württemberg	267	Neckar-Zaber	Eberhard Gienger	CDU
Baden-Württemberg	268	Heilbronn	Thomas Strobl	CDU
Baden-Württemberg	269	Schwäbisch Hall – Hohenlohe	Christian von Stetten	CDU
Baden-Württemberg	270	Backnang – Schwäbisch Gmünd	Norbert Barthle	CDU
Baden-Württemberg	271	Aalen – Heidenheim	Georg Brunnhuber	CDU
Baden-Württemberg	272	Karlsruhe-Stadt	Ingo Wellenreuther	CDU
Baden-Württemberg	273	Karlsruhe-Land	Axel Fischer	CDU
Baden-Württemberg	274	Rastatt	Peter Götz	CDU
Baden-Württemberg	275	Heidelberg	Karl A. Lamers	CDU
Baden-Württemberg	276	Mannheim	Lothar Mark	SPD
Baden-Württemberg	277	Odenwald – Tauber	Kurt Segner	CDU
Baden-Württemberg	278	Rhein-Neckar	Bernd Schmidbauer	CDU
Baden-Württemberg	279	Bruchsal – Schwetzingen	Olav Gutting	CDU
Baden-Württemberg	280	Pforzheim	Gunther Krichbaum	CDU
Baden-Württemberg	281	Calw	Hans-Joachim Fuchtel	CDU
Baden-Württemberg	282	Freiburg	Gernot Erler	SPD
Baden-Württemberg	283	Lörrach – Müllheim	Marion Caspers-Merk	SPD
Baden-Württemberg	284	Emmendingen – Lahr	Peter Weiß	CDU
Baden-Württemberg	285	Offenburg	Wolfgang Schäuble	CDU
Baden-Württemberg	286	Rottweil – Tuttlingen	Volker Kauder	CDU
Baden-Württemberg	287	Schwarzwald-Baar	Siegfried Kauder	CDU
Baden-Württemberg	288	Konstanz	Andreas Jung	CDU
Baden-Württemberg	289	Waldshut	Thomas Dörflinger	CDU
Baden-Württemberg	290	Reutlingen	Ernst-Reinhard Beck	CDU
Baden-Württemberg	291	Tübingen	Annette Widmann-Mauz	CDU
Baden-Württemberg	292	Ulm	Annette Schavan	CDU
Baden-Württemberg	293	Biberach	Franz Romer	CDU
Baden-Württemberg	294	Ravensburg – Bodensee	Andreas Schockenhoff	CDU
Baden-Württemberg	295	Zollernalb – Sigmaringen	Thomas Bareiß	CDU
Baden-Württemberg	List		Rainer Arnold	SPD
Baden-Württemberg	List		Lothar Binding	SPD
Baden-Württemberg	List		Herta Däubler-Gmelin	SPD
Baden-Württemberg	List		Elvira Drobinski-Weiß	SPD
Baden-Württemberg	List		Peter Friedrich	SPD
Baden-Württemberg	List		Martin Gerster	SPD
Baden-Württemberg	List		Renate Gradistanac	SPD
Baden-Württemberg	List		Johannes Jung	SPD
Baden-Württemberg	List		Josip Juratovic	SPD
Baden-Württemberg	List		Nicolette Kressl	SPD
Baden-Württemberg	List		Christian Lange	SPD
Baden-Württemberg	List		Katja Mast	SPD
Baden-Württemberg	List		Hilde Mattheis	SPD
Baden-Württemberg	List		Walter Riester	SPD
Baden-Württemberg	List		Karin Roth	SPD
Baden-Württemberg	List		Hermann Scheer	SPD
Baden-Württemberg	List		Rita Schwarzelühr-Sutter	SPD
Baden-Württemberg	List		Jörg Tauss	SPD
Baden-Württemberg	List		Gert Weisskirchen	SPD
Baden-Württemberg	List		Ernst Burgbacher	FDP
Baden-Württemberg	List		Birgit Homburger	FDP
Baden-Württemberg	List		Sibylle Laurischk	FDP
Baden-Württemberg	List		Harald Leibrecht	FDP
Baden-Württemberg	List		Michael Georg Link	FDP
Baden-Württemberg	List		Patrick Meinhardt	FDP
Baden-Württemberg	List		Dirk Niebel	FDP
Baden-Württemberg	List		Florian Toncar	FDP
Baden-Württemberg	List		Hartfrid Wolff	FDP
Baden-Württemberg	List		Kerstin Andreae	Greens
Baden-Württemberg	List		Birgitt Bender	Greens
Baden-Württemberg	List		Alexander Bonde	Greens
Baden-Württemberg	List		Uschi Eid	Greens
Baden-Württemberg	List		Winfried Hermann	Greens
Baden-Württemberg	List		Sylvia Kotting-Uhl	Greens
Baden-Württemberg	List		Fritz Kuhn	Greens
Baden-Württemberg	List		Gerhard Schick	Greens
Baden-Württemberg	List		Karin Binder	Linke
Baden-Württemberg	List		Heike Hänsel	Linke
Baden-Württemberg	List		Ulrich Maurer	Linke
Saarland	296	Saarbrücken	Elke Ferner	SPD
Saarland	297	Saarlouis	Ottmar Schreiner	SPD
Saarland	298	St. Wendel	Rainer Tabillion	SPD
Saarland	299	Homburg	Astrid Klug	SPD
Saarland	List		Peter Altmaier	CDU
Saarland	List		Anette Hübinger	CDU
Saarland	List		Peter Müller (Note: Peter Müller resigned on 26 November 2005.)	CDU
Saarland	List		Hermann-Josef Scharf (Note: Hermann-Josef Scharf took office on 30 November 2005, to succeed Peter Müller.)	CDU
Saarland	List		Hans-Kurt Hill	Linke
Saarland	List		Volker Schneider	Linke
Saarland	List		Karl Addicks	FDP

== Changes of membership after the election of 18 September 2005 ==
Vacated by	State and mode of election	Reason and date for vacancy	Successor	Date of succession	Seats
Edmund Stoiber (CDU/CSU)	Bayern (list)	Resigned on 8 November 2005 to stay in office as Minister-President of Bavaria.	Johannes Singhammer (CDU/CSU)	11 November 2005	614
Dagmar Schmidt (SPD)	Nordrhein-Westfalen (list)	Died on 9 November 2005.	Christoph Pries (SPD)	16 November 2005	614
Günther Beckstein (CDU/CSU)	Bayern (list)	Resigned on 22 November 2005 to stay in office as Minister of the Interior of Bavaria.	Dorothee Bär (CDU/CSU)	23 November 2005	614
Gerhard Schröder (SPD)	Niedersachsen (list)	Resigned on 23 November 2005.	Clemens Bollen (SPD)	29 November 2005	614
Peter Müller (CDU/CSU)	Saarland (list)	Resigned on 25 November 2005 to stay in office as Minister-President of the Saarland.	Hermann-Josef Scharf (CDU/CSU)	30 November 2005	614
Joschka Fischer (Greens)	Hessen (list)	Resigned on 31 August 2006.	Omid Nouripour (Greens)	1 September 2006	614
Friedbert Pflüger (CDU/CSU)	Niedersachsen (list)	Resigned on 24 November 2006 to become minority leader in the Berlin Abgeordnetenhaus.	Hans Peter Thul (CDU/CSU)	25 November 2006	614
Matthias Berninger (Greens)	Hessen (list)	Resigned on 19 February 2007.	Nicole Maisch (Greens)	20 February 2007	614
Matthias Wissmann (CDU/CSU)	Baden-Württemberg (district 266 — Ludwigsburg)	Resigned on 1 June 2007.	None (overhang seat)		613
Hans-Jürgen Uhl (SPD)	Niedersachsen (district 51 — Helmstedt — Wolfsburg)	Resigned on 1 June 2007.	Dieter Steinecke (SPD)	2 June 2007	613
Reinhard Göhner (CDU/CSU)	Nordrhein-Westfalen (list)	Resigned on 7 July 2007.	Cajus Caesar (CDU/CSU)	9 July 2007	613
Peter Paziorek (CDU/CSU)	Nordrhein-Westfalen (district 131 — Warendorf)	Resigned on 1 September 2007.	Stephan Eisel (CDU/CSU)	3 September 2007	613
Reinhard Loske (Greens)	Nordrhein-Westfalen (list)	Resigned on 1 September 2007.	Bettina Herlitzius (Greens)	3 September 2007	613
Georg Fahrenschon (CDU/CSU)	Bayern (district 223 — München-Land)	Resigned on 8 November 2007.	Marion Seib (CDU/CSU)	8 November 2007	613
Carl Eduard von Bismarck (CDU/CSU)	Schleswig-Holstein (district 10 — Herzogtum Lauenburg — Stormarn-Süd)	Resigned on 10 December 2007.	Helmut Lamp (CDU/CSU)	20 December 2007	613
Margareta Wolf (Greens)	Hessen (list)	Resigned on 4 January 2008.	Wolfgang Strengmann-Kuhn (Greens)	4 January 2008	613
Johann-Henrich Krummacher (CDU/CSU)	Baden-Württemberg (district 259 — Stuttgart I)	Died on 25 February 2008.	None (overhang seat)		612
Anja Hajduk (Greens)	Hamburg (list)	Resigned on 8 May 2008 to become Senator in Hamburg.	Manuel Sarrazin (Greens)	13 May 2008	612
Bernward Müller (CDU/CSU)	Thüringen (list)	Resigned on 9 May 2008 to become a minister in Thuringia.	Christian Hirte (CDU/CSU)	15 May 2008	612
Hildegard Müller (CDU/CSU)	Nordrhein-Westfalen (district 107 — Düsseldorf I)	Resigned on 1 October 2008.	Thomas Mahlberg (CDU/CSU)	7 October 2008	612
Martin Zeil (FDP)	Bayern (list)	Resigned on 1 November 2008 after becoming a minister in Bavaria.	Erwin Lotter (FDP)	1 November 2008	612
Jörg Rohde (FDP)	Bayern (list)	Resigned on 1 November 2008 after becoming Deputy Speaker of the Bavarian Landtag.	Daniel Volk (FDP)	1 November 2008	612
Horst Seehofer (CDU/CSU)	Bayern (district 218 — Ingolstadt)	Resigned on 5 November 2008 after becoming Minister-President of Bavaria.	Matthäus Strebl (CDU/CSU)	10 November 2008	612
Ditmar Staffelt (SPD)	Berlin (district 83 — Berlin-Neukölln)	Resigned on 12 January 2009.	Eva Högl (SPD)	12 January 2009	612
Ralf Göbel (CDU/CSU)	Bayern (district 213 — Southern Palatinate)	Resigned on 1 March 2009.	Werner Wittlich (CDU/CSU)	1 March 2009	612
Rainer Wend (SPD)	Nordrhein-Westfalen (district 133 — Bielefeld)	Resigned on 1 April 2009.	Hildegard Wester (SPD)	1 April 2009	612
Frank Schmidt (SPD)	Hessen (list)	Resigned on 25 May 2009 to become Mayor of Löhnberg.	Erika Ober (SPD)	25 May 2009	612
Peter Jahr (CDU/CSU)	Sachsen (district 163 — Döbeln-Mittweida-Meißen II)	Resigned on 14 July 2009 to become a Member of the European Parliament.	None (overhang seat)		611
Lothar Bisky (Die Linke.)	Brandenburg (list)	Resigned on 14 July 2009 to become a Member of the European Parliament.	Steffen Hultsch (Die Linke.)	14 July 2009	611
Uwe Barth (FDP)	Thüringen (list)	Resigned on 28 September 2009 to become a member of the Landtag of Thüringen.	Patrick Kurth (FDP)	29 September 2009	611
Bodo Ramelow (Die Linke.)	Thüringen (list)	Resigned on 28 September 2009 to become a member of the Landtag of Thüringen.	Frank Tempel (Die Linke.)	29 September 2009	611

== Changes of caucus after the election of 18 September 2005 ==
Member	Former caucus	Date of changing caucuses	New caucus
Gert Winkelmeier	The Left	13 February 2006	Unaffiliated
Henry Nitzsche	CDU/CSU	15 December 2006	Unaffiliated
Jörg Tauss	SPD	20 June 2009	Unaffiliated

== See also ==
- Politics of Germany
- List of Bundestag Members
