= Herlitzius =

Herlitzius is a surname. Notable people with the surname include:

- Evelyn Herlitzius (born 1963), German opera singer
- Bettina Herlitzius (born 1960), German politician
