= Sarah Lahrkamp =

German politician (born 1981)

Member of the Bundestag
- In office October 2021 – March 2025

Personal details
- Born: 4 July 1981 (age 45) Gronau, North Rhine-Westphalia, West Germany (now Germany)
- Party: SPD
- Education: University of Münster

Sarah Lahrkamp (née Withut, born 4 July 1981) is a German politician of the Social Democratic Party (SPD) who served as a Member of the Bundestag from 2021 to 2025.

== Political career ==
Lahrkamp contested Steinfurt I – Borken I and lost to Health Minister Jens Spahn (CDU). She won a seat on the party list.

In parliament, Lahrkamp has since been serving on the Committee on Family Affairs, Senior Citizens, Women and Youth. Within her parliamentary group, she belongs to the Parliamentary Left, a left-wing movement.

In 2025 she contested again in Steinfurt I - Borken I and lost to Jens Spahn. Placed on 24th on the state list of the social democrats in North Rhine-Westphalia she also missed re-election through the party list.
