= Cajus Julius Caesar =

German politician (born 1951)

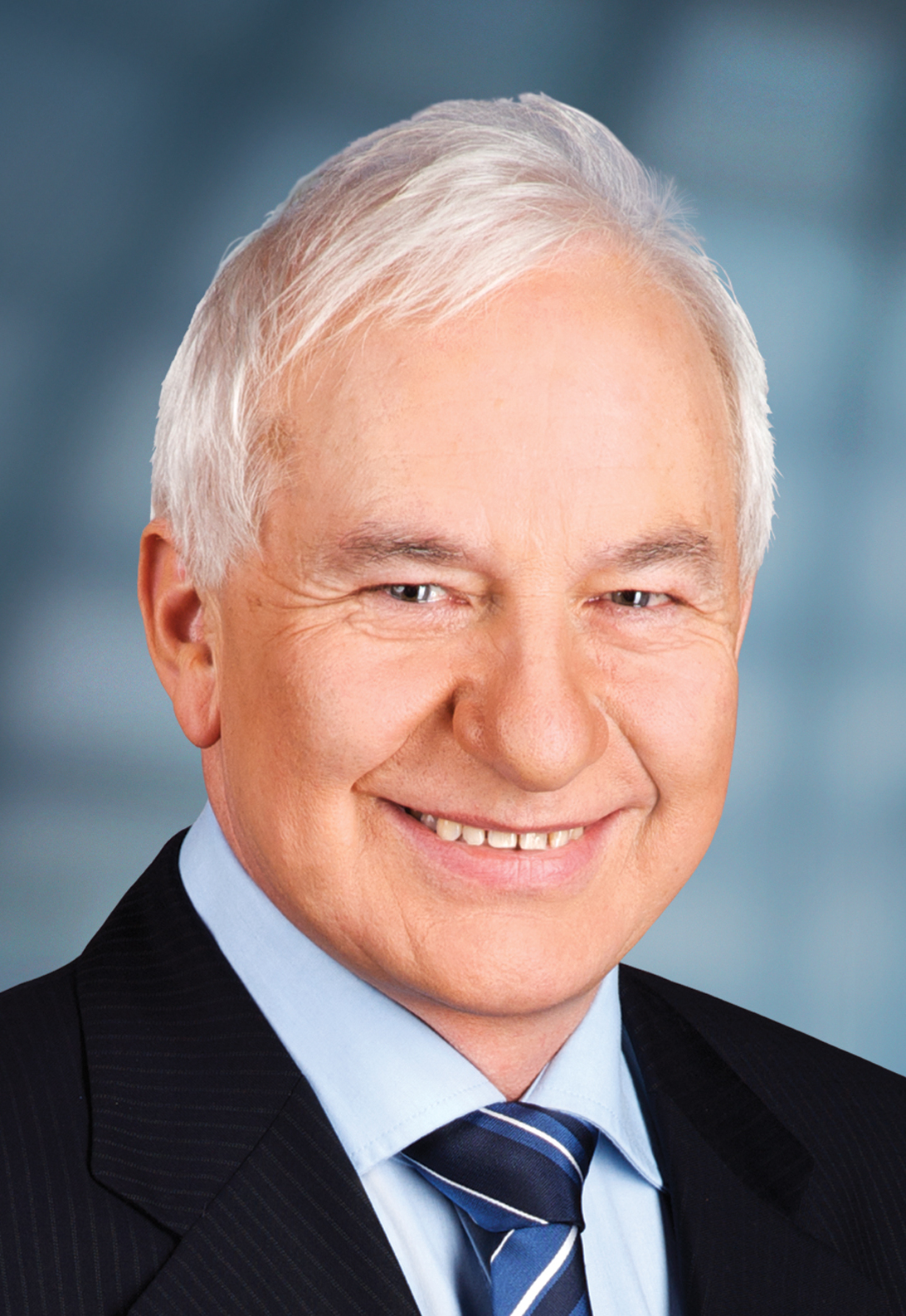
- Caesar in 2009

Member of the Bundestag for North Rhine-Westphalia
- Constituency: CDU List
- In office 1 February 2011 – 24 October 2017
- In office 7 July 2007 – 27 October 2009
- In office 26 October 1998 – 18 October 2005

Personal details
- Born: 22 January 1951 (age 74); Rinteln, West Germany
- Political party: CDU

Cajus Julius Caesar (born 22 January 1951) is a German politician of the Christian Democratic Union (CDU). He served in the Bundestag, the parliament of Germany, 1998–2005, 2007–2009 and 2011–2017.

== Life ==
Caesar was born in Rinteln. He attended primary school in Nettelstedt and secondary school in Lübbecke before an apprenticeship as a forester and studies of forestry at the state forestry school in Arnsberg, passing his forestry diploma in 1974. He worked in forestry and forestry administration from 1974 to 1998.

Caesar is a Protestant. He is married to Gudrun Caesar and has two sons and a daughter. The name "Cajus Julius Caesar", referencing the Roman general and politician Gaius Julius Caesar, has become a family tradition; however, Caesar states that he can neither prove or disprove to be related to the ancient Roman. Both Caesar's father and one of his sons, a pilot, also share the name, as does his grandson. When he first met Minister of the Interior Wolfgang Schäuble, Caesar had to prove his name with his driver's license.

Caesar, a long-time member of the forest protection association Schutzgemeinschaft Deutscher Wald, received the Goldene Tanne (Golden fir tree) award in 2016.

== Political career ==
Caesar became a member of the Junge Union and the CDU in 1969 and held various local chair positions in his party before becoming district chair in 1990. He was a member of the Bundestag 1998–2005, 2007–2009 and 2011–2017, always standing in the Lippe I constituency but elected via the CDU party list for North Rhine-Westphalia. In the 2005 German federal election, Caesar seemed to have won a seat but after a delayed election in Dresden I where the CDU candidate was elected, the seat fell to the Saarland party list instead. Caesar became a member of parliament again when Reinhard Göhner resigned his seat in 2007. After failing to be reelected in the 2009 German federal election, Caesar again replaced a retiring member, Leo Dautzenberg, from 2011 until 2017.

In 2018, Caesar was named the government's forestry representative by the Federal Minister of Agriculture Julia Klöckner.
