= Steinfurt I – Borken I =

Federal electoral district of Germany

123 Steinfurt I – Borken I
- Electoral district for the Bundestag
- Steinfurt I – Borken I in 2025
- State: North Rhine-Westphalia
- Population: 275,800 (2019)
- Electorate: 202,388 (2021)
- Major settlements: Rheine; Gronau; Ahaus
- Area: 978.0 km^{2}

Current electoral district
- Created: 2002
- Party: CDU
- Member: Jens Spahn
- Elected: 2002, 2005, 2009, 2013, 2017, 2021, 2025

Steinfurt I – Borken I is an electoral constituency (German: Wahlkreis) represented in the Bundestag. It elects one member via first-past-the-post voting. Under the current constituency numbering system, it is designated as constituency 123. It is located in northern North Rhine-Westphalia, comprising the western part of Steinfurt district and the eastern part of Borken district.

Steinfurt I – Borken I was created for the 2002 federal election. Since 2002, it has been represented by Jens Spahn of the Christian Democratic Union (CDU).

== Geography ==
Steinfurt I – Borken I is located in northern North Rhine-Westphalia. As of the 2021 federal election, it comprises the municipalities of Horstmar, Metelen, Neuenkirchen, Ochtrup, Rheine, Steinfurt, and Wettringen from Steinfurt district, and the municipalities of Ahaus, Gronau, Heek, Legden, and Schöppingen from Borken district.

== History ==
Steinfurt I – Borken I was created in 2002. Until the 2013 election, it was constituency 125 in the numbering system. In the 2013 through 2021 elections, it was number 124. From the 2025 election, it has been number 123.

== Members ==
The constituency has been held by Jens Spahn of the Christian Democratic Union (CDU) since its creation. When he was first elected in 2002, Spahn was the youngest member of the Bundestag.

Election	Member	Party	%
2002	Jens Spahn	CDU	48.2
2005	Jens Spahn	CDU	51.2
2009	Jens Spahn	CDU	44.5
2013	Jens Spahn	CDU	52.0
2017	Jens Spahn	CDU	51.2
2021	Jens Spahn	CDU	40.0
2025	Jens Spahn	CDU	41.8

== Election results ==
=== 2025 election ===
Federal election (2025): Steinfurt I – Borken I
Notes:	Blue background denotes the winner of the electorate vote. Pink background denotes a candidate elected from their party list. Yellow background denotes an electorate win by a list member, or other incumbent. A ✓ or ✗ denotes status of any incumbent, win or lose respectively.						
Party	Candidate	Votes	%	±%	Party votes	%	±%
CDU	✓ Jens Spahn	70,066	41.8	▲1.8	65,100	38.8	▲5.1
SPD	Sarah Lahrkamp	38,037	22.7	▼5.6	31,174	18.6	▼10.1
AfD	Martin Ostermann	25,233	15.1	▲9.6	24,879	14.8	▲9.5
Greens	Alexandra Schoo	15,800	9.4	▼2.6	17,571	10.5	▼2.7
Left	Mareike Hermeier	10,029	6.0	▲3.6	10,636	6.3	▲3.5
FDP	Ekkehard Grütner	5,775	3.4	▼5.9	7,070	4.2	▼7.2
BSW					5,420	3.2	
FW	Maximilian Gerdes	2,633	1.6	▲0.6	1,122	0.7	▲0.1
Tierschutzpartei					1,809	1.1	▲0.1
Volt					949	0.6	▲0.3
PARTEI				▼1.6	836	0.5	▼0.4
PdF					327	0.2	▲0.2
dieBasis					324	0.2	▼0.5
Team Todenhöfer					206	0.1	▼0.2
BD					167	0.1	
MERA25					74	0.0	
Values					63	0.0	
MLPD					25	0.0	0.0
Pirates							▼0.3
Gesundheitsforschung							▼0.1
Humanists							▼0.1
ÖDP							▼0.1
Bündnis C						0.0	0.0
SGP						0.0	0.0
Informal votes		1,062			883		
Total valid votes		167,573			167,752		
Turnout		168,635	83.6	▲6.1			
CDU hold	Majority	32,029	19.1				

=== 2021 election ===
Federal election (2021): Steinfurt I – Borken I
Notes:	Blue background denotes the winner of the electorate vote. Pink background denotes a candidate elected from their party list. Yellow background denotes an electorate win by a list member, or other incumbent. A ✓ or ✗ denotes status of any incumbent, win or lose respectively.						
Party	Candidate	Votes	%	±%	Party votes	%	±%
CDU	✓ Jens Spahn	62,322	40.0	▼11.3	52,625	33.8	▼10.2
SPD	Sarah Lahrkamp	44,047	28.3	▲2.4	44,788	28.7	▲5.6
Greens	Alexandra Schoo	18,743	12.0	▲6.7	20,525	13.2	▲7.2
FDP	Alexander Brockmeier	14,515	9.3	▲2.7	17,783	11.4	▼1.2
AfD	Torsten Etgeton	8,482	5.4	▼0.6	8,385	5.4	▼1.0
Left	Gerrit Bresch	3,699	2.4	▼2.6	4,469	2.9	▼2.6
Tierschutzpartei					1,510	1.0	▲0.5
PARTEI	Lars Nowak	2,437	1.6		1,354	0.9	▲0.3
dieBasis					1,050	0.7	
FW	Markus Krafczyk	1,473	0.9		937	0.6	▲0.4
Pirates					521	0.3	0.0
Volt					492	0.3	
Team Todenhöfer					432	0.3	
LIEBE					163	0.1	
Gesundheitsforschung					137	0.1	0.0
NPD					130	0.1	▼0.1
LfK					130	0.1	
Humanists					95	0.1	0.0
ÖDP					84	0.1	0.0
V-Partei3					72	0.0	0.0
Bündnis C					60	0.0	
PdF					53	0.0	
du.					52	0.0	
LKR					23	0.0	
MLPD					19	0.0	0.0
DKP					15	0.0	0.0
SGP					15	0.0	0.0
Informal votes		1,176			975		
Total valid votes		155,718			155,919		
Turnout		156,894	77.5	▲1.1			
CDU hold	Majority	18,275	11.7	▼13.7			

=== 2017 election ===
Federal election (2017): Steinfurt I – Borken I
Notes:	Blue background denotes the winner of the electorate vote. Pink background denotes a candidate elected from their party list. Yellow background denotes an electorate win by a list member, or other incumbent. A ✓ or ✗ denotes status of any incumbent, win or lose respectively.						
Party	Candidate	Votes	%	±%	Party votes	%	±%
CDU	✓ Jens Spahn	78,579	51.3	▼0.7	67,425	43.9	▼5.9
SPD	Ingrid Arndt-Brauer	39,584	25.8	▼6.0	35,466	23.1	▼5.0
FDP	Dietmar Lütkemeyer	10,082	6.6	▲3.8	19,339	12.6	▲7.5
AfD	Mario Mieruch	9,265	6.0	▲3.8	9,719	6.3	▲3.5
Greens	Bernhard Lammersmann	8,118	5.3	▲0.2	9,142	6.0	▼0.2
Left	Hannes Draeger	7,554	4.9	▲1.2	8,433	5.5	▲1.1
PARTEI					883	0.6	▲0.3
Tierschutzpartei					762	0.5	
Pirates					541	0.4	▼1.5
FW					368	0.2	0.0
AD-DEMOKRATEN					290	0.2	
NPD					255	0.2	▼0.5
DM					130	0.1	
Gesundheitsforschung					127	0.1	
ÖDP					122	0.1	0.0
BGE					120	0.1	
DiB					120	0.1	
V-Partei³					96	0.1	
Volksabstimmung					90	0.1	0.0
Die Humanisten					72	0.0	
MLPD					56	0.0	0.0
DKP					15	0.0	
SGP					7	0.0	0.0
Informal votes		1,424			1,028		
Total valid votes		153,182			153,678		
Turnout		154,606	76.5	▲3.1			
CDU hold	Majority	38,995	25.5	▲5.4			

=== 2013 election ===
Federal election (2013): Steinfurt I – Borken I
Notes:	Blue background denotes the winner of the electorate vote. Pink background denotes a candidate elected from their party list. Yellow background denotes an electorate win by a list member, or other incumbent. A ✓ or ✗ denotes status of any incumbent, win or lose respectively.						
Party	Candidate	Votes	%	±%	Party votes	%	±%
CDU	✓ Jens Spahn	75,853	52.0	▲7.5	72,802	49.8	▲8.2
SPD	Ingrid Arndt-Brauer	46,459	31.9	▲1.7	41,073	28.1	▲3.6
Greens	Jörg Winterfeldt	7,458	5.1	▼1.1	8,936	6.1	▼1.6
Left	Robert Brandt	5,484	3.8	▼2.1	6,420	4.4	▼2.1
FDP	Claudia Bögel	4,075	2.8	▼9.6	7,434	5.1	▼10.6
AfD	Helmut Seifen	3,272	2.2		4,126	2.8	
Pirates	Wiebke van den Berg	3,246	2.2		2,778	1.9	▲0.3
NPD					943	0.6	▼0.1
PARTEI					434	0.3	
FW					282	0.2	
ÖDP					155	0.1	0.0
Volksabstimmung					152	0.1	▲0.1
PRO					146	0.1	
Nichtwahler					130	0.1	
REP					123	0.1	▼0.1
Party of Reason					90	0.1	
RRP					54	0.0	▼0.1
BIG					40	0.0	
Die Rechte					28	0.0	
PSG					24	0.0	0.0
MLPD					20	0.0	0.0
BüSo					16	0.0	0.0
Informal votes		1,602			1,243		
Total valid votes		145,847			146,206		
Turnout		147,449	73.3	▲1.6			
CDU hold	Majority	29,394	20.1	▲5.8			

=== 2009 election ===
Federal election (2009): Steinfurt I – Borken I
Notes:	Blue background denotes the winner of the electorate vote. Pink background denotes a candidate elected from their party list. Yellow background denotes an electorate win by a list member, or other incumbent. A ✓ or ✗ denotes status of any incumbent, win or lose respectively.						
Party	Candidate	Votes	%	±%	Party votes	%	±%
CDU	✓ Jens Spahn	63,123	44.5	▼6.6	59,231	41.6	▼2.8
SPD	Ingrid Arndt-Brauer	42,736	30.2	▼7.8	34,893	24.5	▼10.2
FDP	Claudia Bögel	17,533	12.4	▲8.6	22,277	15.7	▲6.0
Greens	Dietmar Eisele	8,774	6.2	▲2.9	10,999	7.7	▲2.2
Left	Ulf Jäger	8,306	5.9	▲3.0	9,197	6.5	▲2.9
Pirates					2,249	1.6	
NPD	Markus Pohl	1,226	0.9	▲0.2	993	0.7	▲0.1
FAMILIE					647	0.5	▲0.1
Tierschutzpartei					568	0.4	0.0
RENTNER					358	0.3	
RRP					227	0.2	
REP					201	0.1	▼0.1
Centre					128	0.1	0.0
ÖDP					113	0.1	
Volksabstimmung					67	0.0	0.0
DVU					62	0.0	
BüSo					20	0.0	0.0
PSG					20	0.0	0.0
MLPD					16	0.0	0.0
Informal votes		1,979			1,411		
Total valid votes		141,698			142,266		
Turnout		143,677	71.7	▼7.2			
CDU hold	Majority	20,387	14.3	▲1.2			

=== 2005 election ===
Federal election (2005): Steinfurt I – Borken I
Notes:	Blue background denotes the winner of the electorate vote. Pink background denotes a candidate elected from their party list. Yellow background denotes an electorate win by a list member, or other incumbent. A ✓ or ✗ denotes status of any incumbent, win or lose respectively.						
Party	Candidate	Votes	%	±%	Party votes	%	±%
CDU	✓ Jens Spahn	78,554	51.2	▲3.0	68,221	44.4	▲0.7
SPD	Ingrid Arndt-Brauer	58,301	38.0	▼3.1	53,336	34.7	▼3.0
FDP	Karl-Heinz Reinartz	5,752	3.7	▼2.2	14,878	9.7	▼0.2
Greens	Manfred Epping	5,028	3.3	▼0.9	8,483	5.5	▼0.9
Left	Gunther Heuchel	4,424	2.9	▲2.2	5,498	3.6	▲2.9
NPD	Karl-Heinz Böwering	1,075	0.7		892	0.6	▲0.4
Tierschutzpartei					537	0.3	▲0.1
Familie					525	0.3	▲0.1
PBC	Heinz Kaulbach	388	0.3		215	0.1	▲0.1
GRAUEN					356	0.2	▲0.1
REP					298	0.2	
From Now on... Democracy Through Referendum					104	0.1	
Centre					100	0.1	
Socialist Equality Party					51	0.0	
BüSo					30	0.0	
MLPD					25	0.0	0.0
Informal votes		1,739			1,712		
Total valid votes		153,522			153,549		
Turnout		155,261	78.9	▼2.4			
CDU hold	Majority	20,253	13.2				
