= Manuel Sarrazin =

German politician (born 1982)

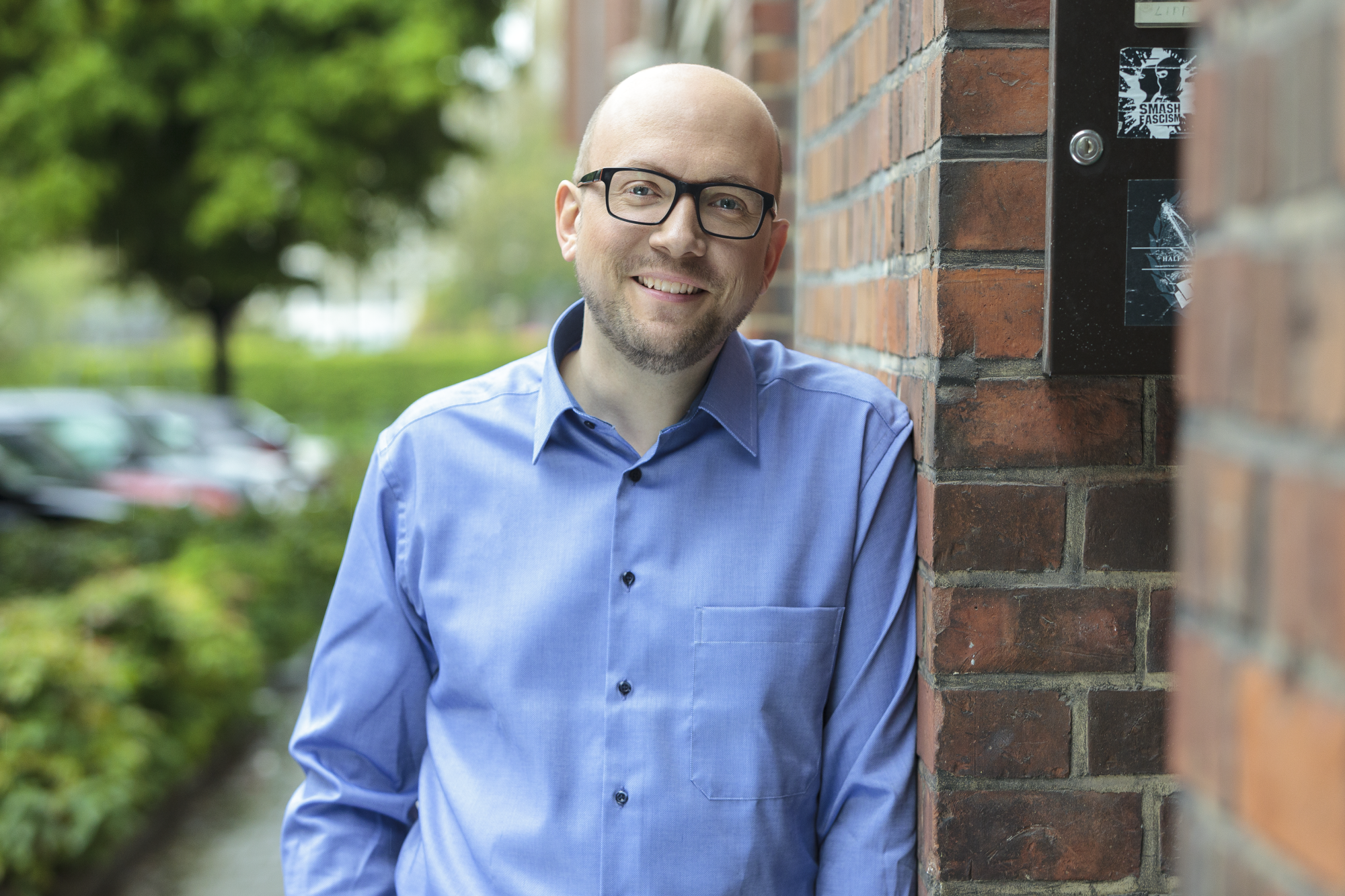
- Sarrazin in 2017

Member of the Bundestag
- In office 2017–2021

Personal details
- Born: 6 February 1982 (age 44) Dortmund, West Germany (now Germany)
- Party: Greens
- Children: 2
- Education: University of Bremen; University of Hamburg

Manuel Ferdinand Theodor Sarrazin (born 6 February 1982) is a German politician of Alliance 90/The Greens who served as a member of the Bundestag from the state of Hamburg from 2008 to 2021. Since 2022, he has been serving as Special Representative for the Countries of the Western Balkan in the government of Chancellor Olaf Scholz.

== Early life and education ==
Sarrazin was born in Dortmund and has lived in the Hamburg district of Harburg since 1995. After graduating from the local Friedrich-Ebert-Gymnasium in 2001 and completing his civilian service, he began studying history, Polish and law at the University of Bremen in 2002. In 2005, he moved to the University of Hamburg, where he completed his studies in history, Eastern European Studies and Law in 2013.

== Political career ==
=== Career in state politics ===
From 2004 to 2008 Sarrazin was a member of the State Parliament of Hamburg.

=== Member of the German Parliament, 2008–2021 ===
Sarrazin succeeded Anja Hajduk in the Bundestag on 13 May 2008. He was a member of the Committee on European Affairs and the Committee on Foreign Affairs. From 2008 until 2013, he also served on the Budget Committee's Subcommittee on European Affairs. He was his parliamentary group's spokesman for Eastern European policy.

In addition to his committee assignments, Sarrazin served as deputy chairman of the German-Polish Parliamentary Friendship Group from 2018 to 2021.

On 24 June 2015 Sarrazin took on a godparenthood for Mikola Dziadok, Belarusian activist and political prisoner. On 9 July 2020 he became the patron of Ihar Losik, Belarusian blogger and political prisoner.

In the negotiations to form a so-called traffic light coalition of the Social Democratic Party (SPD), the Green Party and the Free Democratic Party (FDP) following the 2021 federal elections, Sarrazin was part of his party's delegation in the working group on European affairs, co-chaired by Udo Bullmann, Franziska Brantner and Nicola Beer.

=== Special Envoy for the Western Balkans, 2022–present ===
In March 2022, Minister of Foreign Affairs Annalena Baerbock appointed Sarrazin as Special Representative for the Countries of the Western Balkan in the government of Chancellor Olaf Scholz.

== Other activities ==
- Petersburger Dialog, Member of the Board
- Southeast Europe Association (SOG), President
- Institute for European Politics (IEP), Member of the Board of Trustees (since 2012)
