= Daniel Funke =

German journalist

Daniel Funke (born 23 July 1981) is a German journalist. Since 2019 he has been the head of the Berlin office and lobbyist at BurdaVerlag, a division of German media company Hubert Burda Media.

From 2002 to 2009, he studied German studies ("Germanistik") and history at Humboldt-Universität Berlin. Between 2004 and 2007, he also worked at the private TV channel Sat. 1 and the magazine Blitz ("Flash"). In 2007, he became an editor at Bunte, a German people magazine, and in 2012, the head of its Berlin office.

== Personal life ==
Funke has been married to German politician and former federal secretary of health Jens Spahn (CDU) since 2017. Funke and Spahn had a child via surrogacy in the United States in July 2026.

== General ==
In 2018 Funke caused controversy with a story he wrote for Bunte magazine about the then-new US ambassador Richard Grenell, which presented Grenell in a very positive light. The story didn't reveal that Funke and Spahn were friends with Grenell and his partner Matt Lashey and could therefore be seen as a political favour to ease Grenell's entry into German politics. In 2024 he left the Bunte Verlag to pursue new projects and tasks.

== FFP 2 masks dealings ==
Funke again caused controversy in March 2021 when it was revealed that his employer had sold 570,000 FFP 2 masks without a formal bidding process conducted by the Federal Ministry of Health, which was led by his husband, Jens Spahn.
