= Clemens Bollen =

German politician and member of the SPD

Member of the Bundestag; from Lower Saxony
- In office 29 November 2005 – 27 October 2009
- Preceded by: Gerhard Schröder
- Succeeded by: Multi-member district
- Constituency: State list

Personal details
- Born: 12 February 1948 (age 78) Rhauderfehn, Germany
- Party: Social Democratic
- Children: 1
- Education: University of Oldenburg

Clemens Bollen (born 12 February 1948) is a German politician and member of the SPD.

== Early life ==
After graduating from secondary school in 1965, Bollen trained as an industrial clerk until 1968. He then worked as an employee in human resources at the Olympia-Werke in Leer until 1979. There he was also deputy chairman of the works council and a member of the central works council. Bollen was the first authorized representative of IG Metall Leer/Papenburg since 1980.
