= Helmut Lamp =

German politician

Member of the Bundestag
- In office 20 December 1990 – 26 October 1998
- In office 28 March 2000 – 17 October 2002
- In office 18 June 2003 – 18 October 2005
- In office 20 December 2007 – 27 October 2009

Personal details
- Born: 3 July 1946 (age 79) Schönberg
- Party: CDU

Helmut Lamp (born 3 July 1946) is a German politician of the Christian Democratic Union (CDU) and former member of the German Bundestag.

== Life ==
Helmut Lamp was a member of the German Bundestag for the first time from 1990 to 1998. On 28 March 2000, he succeeded the late Gert Willner as a member of the Bundestag, where he remained until the end of the 14th parliamentary term in 2002. On 18 June 2003, he moved back into the Bundestag as a successor to the retired Member of Parliament Angelika Volquartz and was again a Member of the Bundestag until the end of the 15th parliamentary term in 2005. In the 16th legislative period until 2009, Lamp was again a successor since 20 December 2007, this time for the resigned Member of Parliament Carl-Eduard von Bismarck.

== Literature ==
Herbst, Ludolf; Jahn, Bruno (2002). Vierhaus, Rudolf (ed.). Biographisches Handbuch der Mitglieder des Deutschen Bundestages. 1949–2002 [Biographical Handbook of the Members of the German Bundestag. 1949–2002] (in German). München: De Gruyter - De Gruyter Saur. p. 1715. ISBN 978-3-11-184511-1.
