= Jörg Tauss =

German politician

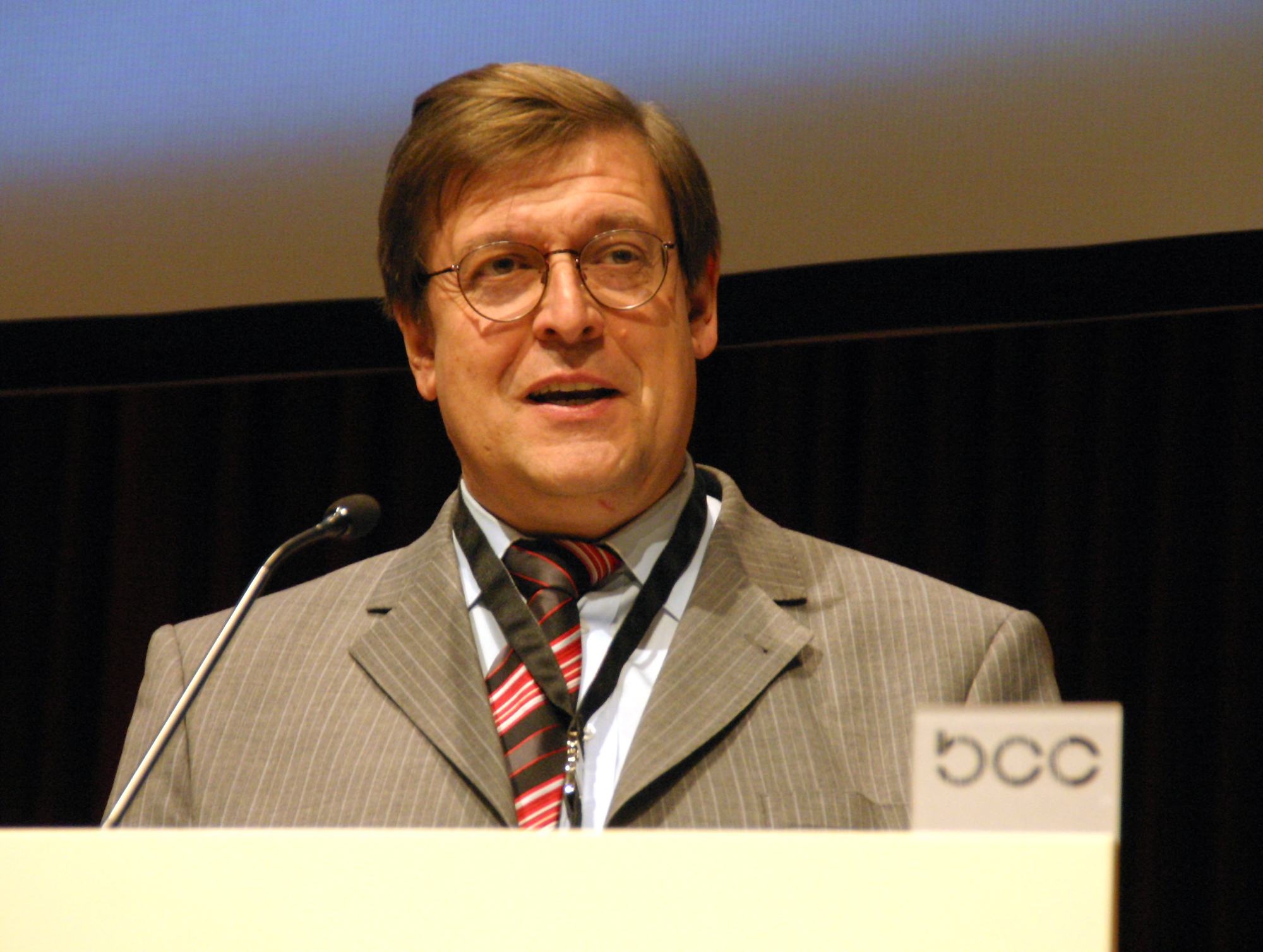
- Jörg Tauss in 2005

Member of the Bundestag
- In office 1994–2009

Personal details
- Born: 5 July 1953 (age 72) Stuttgart, Baden-Württemberg, West Germany
- Party: Social Democratic Party (1971–2009); Pirate Party Germany (2009–2010)
- Occupation: Insurance salesman
- Website: www.tauss.de

Jörg Tauss (born 5 July 1953) is a German politician and former member of the Social Democratic Party of Germany (SPD). He was born in Stuttgart. From 2000 to 2009, Tauss was the spokesperson of the Education and Research workgroup of the SPD in the Bundestag. He also served within that time as regional party general secretary for Baden-Württemberg.

On 6 March 2009, his home and offices in Berlin and Karlsruhe were raided by the LKAs of both Berlin and Baden-Württemberg in a search for child pornography which he had allegedly obtained on his mobile phone. Although he claimed that the raid and investigation were politically motivated, he resigned from all government posts on 7 March, and was stripped of his parliamentary immunity on the same day. Prosecutors began the investigation after they had obtained access to phone numbers and addresses found on the mobile phone of a Bremerhaven man who was suspected of participation in a child pornography ring. He stated on 11 March that he had purchased the material only for investigation purposes pertinent to his office. He reports that his research suggests that child pornography is typically distributed by MMS and traditional mail, so that blocking websites is ineffective.

On 20 June 2009, Tauss announced he was leaving the SPD for the Pirate Party Germany in protest against that party's support of legislation that would block child pornography websites, which he said would set up a technical infrastructure of censorship without judicial review. On 1 July, Tauss appealed the law because of formal reasons at the Federal Constitutional Court in Karlsruhe. On 8 September 2009, he was stripped of his parliamentary immunity and the next day he was formally charged. In May 2010 he got a suspended prison sentence of 15 months. The judge concluded that he had been active in the online child pornography scene for private reasons rather than out of political motives relating to his parliamentary work. However, the judge did not think his motivation had necessarily been sexual, it could have been sheer curiosity. 'This is a judgement which I cannot live with and do not want to live with,' Tauss said after the trial. He announced he would appeal the verdict, which became final on 24 August 2010, as the Federal Court of Justice rejected his appeal as "manifestly unfounded" ("offensichtlich unbegründet").
