= Peter Jahr =

German politician (born 1959)

Peter Jahr MEP
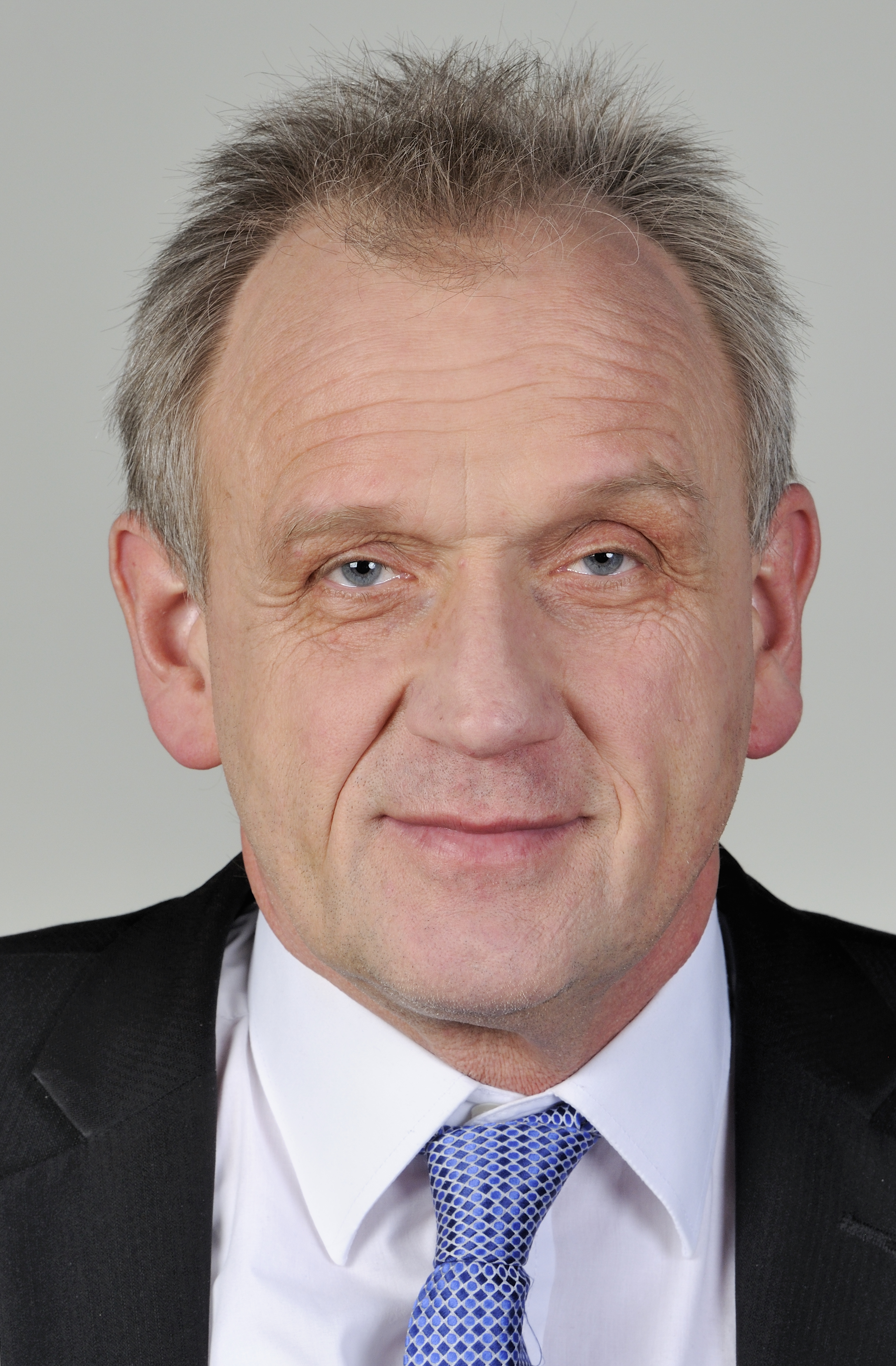

Member of the European Parliament
- In office 14 July 2009 – 2024
- Constituency: Germany

Member of the Bundestag
- In office 22 September 2002 – 27 September 2009
- Constituency: Döbeln - Mittweida - Meißen II

Member of the Landtag of Saxony
- In office 4 July 1990 – 22 September 2002
- Constituency: Mittweida 2

Personal details
- Born: 24 April 1959 (age 67) Burgstädt, Germany
- Party: German; Christian Democratic Union; EU; European People's Party
- Education: University of Leipzig
- Website: http://www.dr-peter-jahr.de/

Video Statement (English) / (German)

Dieter Peter Jahr (born 24 April 1959) is a German politician who served as a member of the European Parliament from 2009 to 2024. He is a member of the Christian Democratic Union, part of the European People's Party.

== Early life and education ==
After Abitur and military service Peter Jahr entered the Karl-Marx-Universität Leipzig to study agricultural science. In 1984 he graduated as Diplom-Landwirt (comp. Master of Agricultural Engineering) and in 1988 obtained a doctorate (Dr.agr.).

From 1984 until 1988 he was research assistant at the Karl-Marx-Universität Leipzig. In 1988 he joined the Justus von Liebig Landwirtschaftliche Produktionsgenossenschaft as administrator. In 1990 he became manager of the Agrar Gmbh, Taura. Since 1995 he is a sideline farmer.

== Political career ==
=== Early beginnings ===
Jahr was a member of the Democratic Farmers' Party of Germany from 1988 to 1990 and joined the Christian Democratic Union in 1990.

From 1990 to 2002, Jahr was Member of the Landtag of Saxony, the German state of Saxony's parliament. He left the Landtag to become a member of the German Bundestag representing the district of Döbeln - Mittweida - Meißen II.

=== Member of the European Parliament, 2009–2024 ===
In 2009 Jahr left the Bundestag to become a Member of the European Parliament. In Parliament, he served on the Committee on Petitions. In 2019, he also joined the Committee on Regional Development, where he served as the rapporteur on the reform of the European Union's Common Agricultural Policy (CAP). From 2009 until 2019, he was a member of the Committee on Agriculture and Rural Development.

In addition to his committee assignments, Jahr was a member of the Delegation to the EU-Armenia, EU-Azerbaijan and EU-Georgia Parliamentary Cooperation Committees and the Delegation to the Euronest Parliamentary Assembly. He is a substitute on the Committee on Budgets and the Delegation for relations with Iraq. He was also a member of the European Parliament Intergroup on Children’s Rights.

In the negotiations to form a coalition government under the leadership of Chancellor Angela Merkel following the 2017 federal elections, Jahr was part of the working group on agriculture, led by Julia Klöckner, Christian Schmidt and Anke Rehlinger. On the local level, he is a member of the City council of Lunzenau since 1994 and was a member of the District council of Mittweida from 1994 to 2008.

Ahead of the 2024 elections, Jahr announced that he would not stand again but instead resign from active politics by the end of the parliamentary term.

== Political positions ==
Ahead of the Christian Democrats’ leadership election in 2018, Jahr publicly endorsed Friedrich Merz to succeed Angela Merkel as the party’s chair.

== Personal life ==
Jahr is married and has four children.
