= Uwe Barth =

German politician and member of the FDP (born 1964)

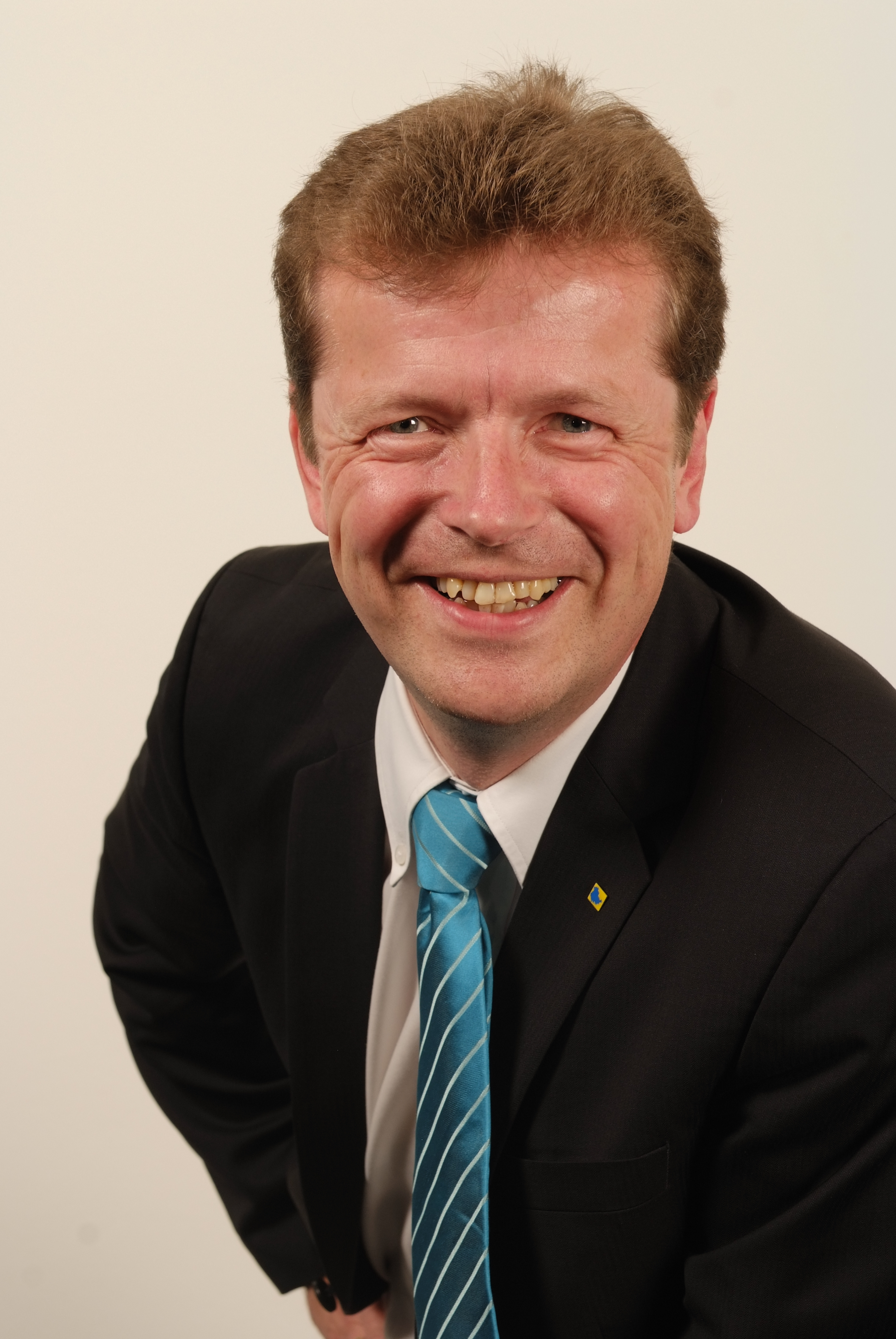
Uwe Barth.

Uwe Barth (born 23 July 1964 in Bad Langensalza, Bezirk Erfurt) is a German politician and member of the FDP.

In 1986 he joined the Liberal Democratic Party of Germany (LDPD), which merged with the FDP in 1990. He was a member of the German Bundestag from 2005 to 2009, representing the state of Thuringia. In the 2009 Thuringia state election he became a member of the Landtag of Thuringia and leader of the FDP Landtag group.
