= Reinhard Göhner =

German politician

Member of the Bundestag
- Incumbent
- Assumed office German federal election

Personal details
- Born: 16 January 1953 (age 73) Bünde, West Germany (now Germany)
- Party: CDU
- Children: 4

Reinhard Göhner is a German politician of the Christian Democratic Union (CDU) and former member of the German Bundestag.

== Life ==
He was Parliamentary State Secretary at the Federal Ministry of Justice from 1991 to 1993 and at the Federal Ministry of Economics from 1993 to 1994. From 1996 to 2016 he was chief executive officer of the Confederation of German Employers' Associations. Göhner joined the CDU and Junge Union during his school years. From 1978 to 1986, he was state chairman of the Junge Union in Westphalia-Lippe.

In 1983 he became a member of the German Bundestag. There he was chairman of the Committee for Environment, Nature Conservation and Nuclear Safety from 1986 to 1990. From 1994 to 1998, Göhner was legal counsel to the CDU/CSU parliamentary group in the Bundestag. Reinhard Göhner always entered the Bundestag via the North Rhine-Westphalia state list. Göhner resigned his seat in the Bundestag on 6 July 2007.
