= Ingrid Arndt-Brauer =

German politician

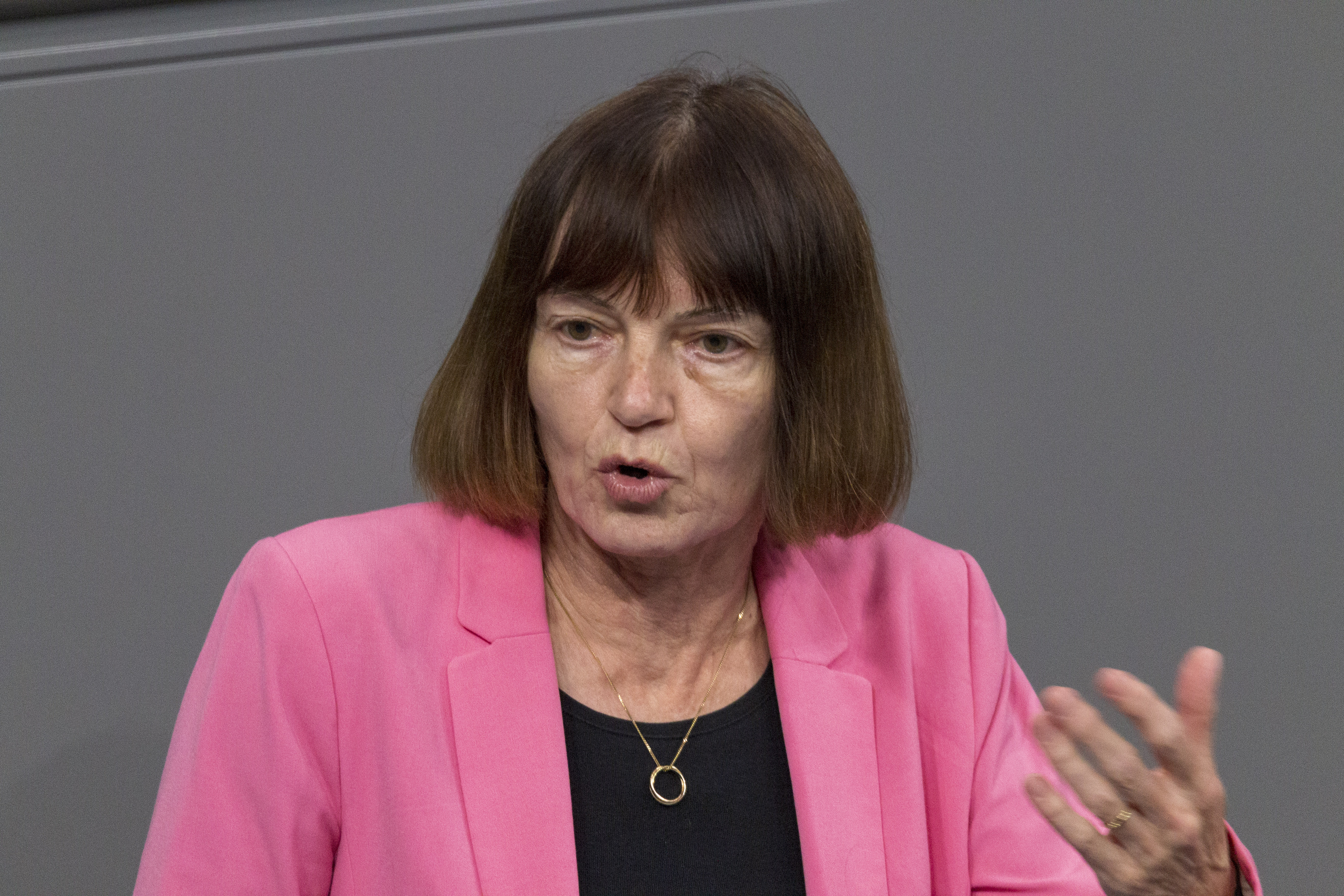
Arndt-Brauer in 2020

Ingrid Arndt-Brauer (born 20 March 1961) is a German politician of the Social Democratic Party (SPD) who served as a member of the Bundestag from 1999 until 2021.

== Early life and education ==
After completing her secondary education with an Abitur, she studied business administration and sociology at University of Marburg, graduating in 1985.

== Political career ==
Arndt-Brauer joined the Social Democratic Party in 1983. From 1994 until 1997, she served as a member of the district parliament (Kreistag) of Steinfurt.

Arndt-Brauer became a member of the Bundestag on July 1, 1999, succeeding Ingrid Matthäus-Maier who had vacated her seat. She has since been serving on the Finance Committee, which she chaired from 2013 until 2017. Between 2006 and 2013, she also served as a member of the Parliamentary Advisory Council on Sustainable Development.

Within the SPD parliamentary group, Arndt-Brauer was a member of the working groups on municipal policy from 2002 until 2013 and on gender equality from 2009 until 2013. She was also part of the parliamentary group's leadership under its successive chairs Thomas Oppermann (2013–2017), Andrea Nahles (2017–2019) and Rolf Mützenich (2019–2021).

In 2014, Arndt-Brauer advocated for changes to Germany's financial policy, such as splitting off the euro policy unit of the Federal Ministry of Finance.

In February 2021, Arndt-Brauer announced that she would not stand in the federal elections later that year but instead resign from active politics by the end of the parliamentary term.

== Other activities ==
- Institut Finanzen und Steuern, Member of the Board of Trustees

== Personal life ==
Ingrid Arndt-Brauer is married and has four children.
