= Bettina Herlitzius =

German politician (born 1960)

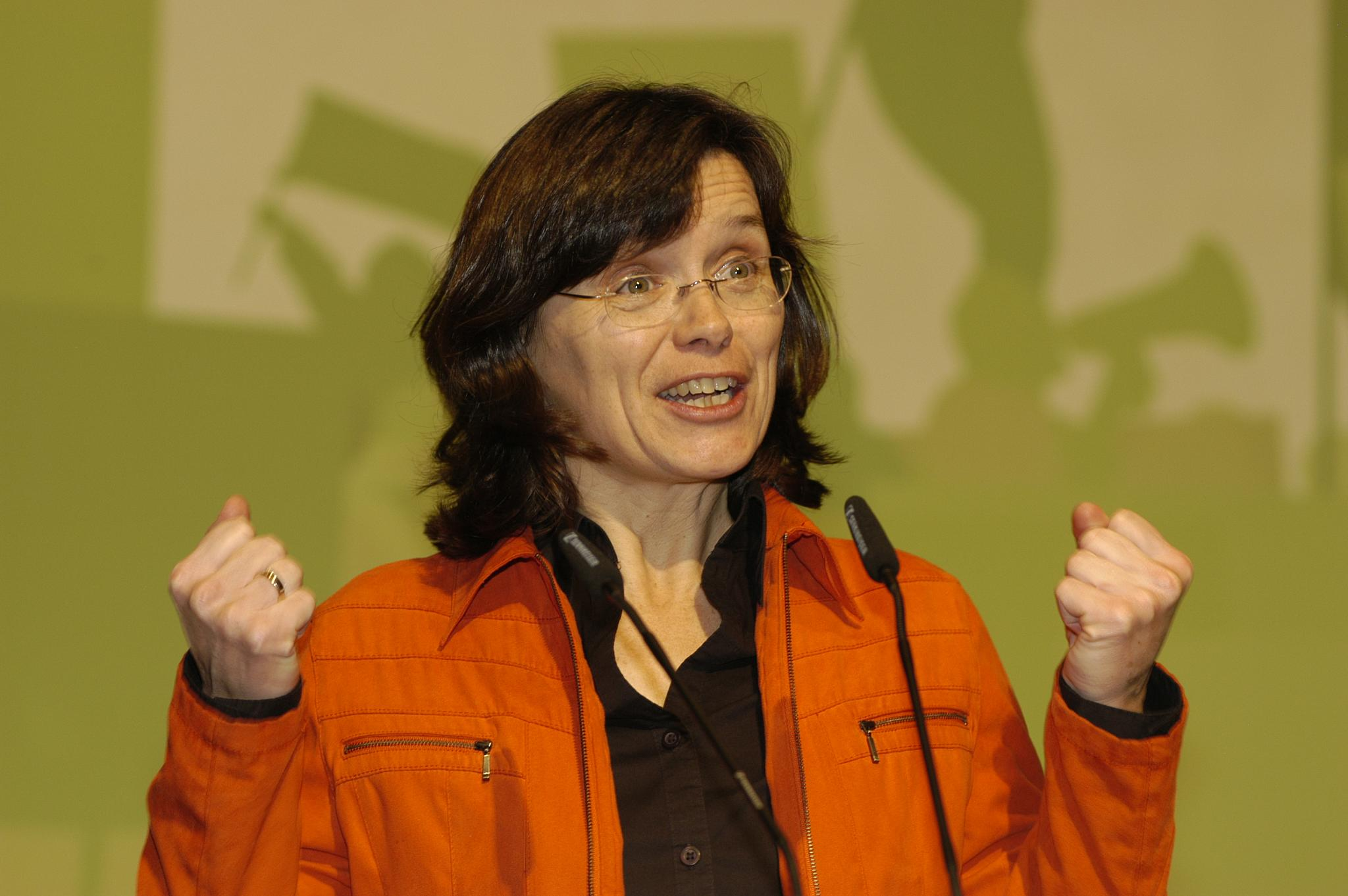
- Herlitzius in 2008

Member of the Bundestag
- In office 2007–2013

Personal details
- Born: 8 July 1960 (age 66) Bad Salzuflen, North Rhine-Westphalia, West Germany
- Party: Alliance '90/The Greens

Bettina Herlitzius (born 8 July 1960) is a German politician, specifically a Green Party representative in the Bundestag.

== Education and career ==
After school, Herlitzius studied architecture at the RWTH Aachen in Aachen where she graduated in 1989. She then worked as an independent architect until 1993 when she began her Referendariat or Training programme at the State Building Authority in the Ministry of Construction and Housing. After completing her final state exams she became director of the Office of Traffic, housing, building and road construction for Aachen county.

== Political career ==
Herlitzius is the Bundestag representative for Kreis Aachen which is located along Germany's borders with Belgium and the Netherlands, 65 km (40 mi) west of Cologne. Her initial term began in 2007 but she was re-elected as MP in September 2009. She is currently Green Party's spokesperson on tourism and housing policy. Her political career so far:-

- Member of the Bündnis 90/Die Grünen since 1989.
- Member of the Rhineland Regional Council (until September 2007 Group vice-president).
- Member and vice chairman of the Regional Cologne.
- Members of the Bundestag since September 2007. Tourism and housing sector Group spokesperson, coordinator for the Federal Transport Infrastructure Plan, and Member of the LAG Transport committee.

Like fellow party member Gerhard Schick, Herlitzius is a committed environmentalist and the pair have taken steps to introduce environmental taxes within the German Parliament.

== Personal life ==
Herlitzius is openly lesbian and she has championed equal rights for LGBT couples since the 1990s. She lives with her partner in a civil union and has one son.
