= Jens Spahn =

German politician (born 1980)

Jens Spahn MdB
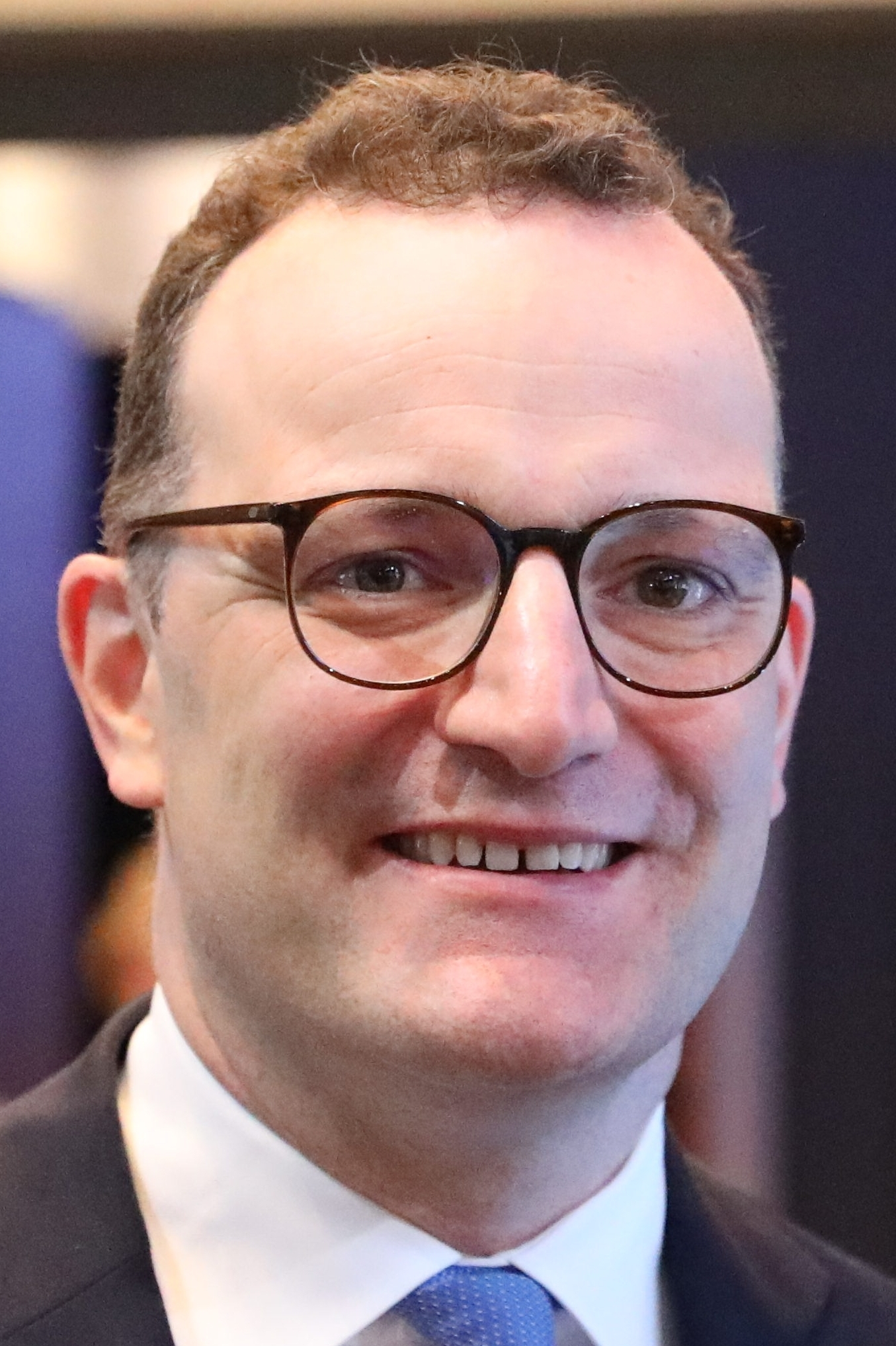
- Spahn in 2025

Leader of the CDU/CSU in the Bundestag
- In office 5 May 2025 – 18 July 2026
- First Deputy: Alexander Hoffmann
- Chief Whip: Steffen Bilger
- Preceded by: Friedrich Merz
- Succeeded by: Thorsten Frei

Minister of Health
- In office 14 March 2018 – 8 December 2021
- Chancellor: Angela Merkel
- Preceded by: Hermann Gröhe
- Succeeded by: Karl Lauterbach

Deputy Leader of the Christian Democratic Union
- In office 16 January 2021 – 20 January 2022 Serving with Silvia Breher, Volker Bouffier, Julia Klöckner and Thomas Strobl
- Leader: Armin Laschet
- Preceded by: Armin Laschet
- Succeeded by: Carsten Linnemann

Parliamentary State Secretary in the Ministry of Finance
- In office 3 July 2015 – 14 March 2018
- Chancellor: Angela Merkel
- Minister: Wolfgang Schäuble; Peter Altmaier (acting)
- Preceded by: Steffen Kampeter
- Succeeded by: Christine Lambrecht

Member of the Bundestag for Steinfurt I – Borken I
- Incumbent
- Assumed office 17 October 2002
- Preceded by: Constituency established

Personal details
- Born: Jens Georg Spahn; 16 May 1980 (age 46) Ahaus, North Rhine-Westphalia, West Germany
- Party: CDU (since 1997)
- Spouse: Daniel Funke (m. 2017)
- Children: 1
- Education: University of Hagen (BA, MA)
- Occupation: Politician; Bank teller; Lobbyist
- Website: Official website

Jens Georg Spahn (born 16 May 1980) is a German politician of the Christian Democratic Union (CDU) who has represented the constituency of Steinfurt I – Borken I in the Bundestag since 2002. From May 2025 until his resignation in July 2026, he served as leader of the joint CDU/CSU (Union) parliamentary group in the 21st Bundestag.

Spahn served as Federal Minister of Health in Chancellor Angela Merkel's fourth cabinet from 2018 to 2021, overseeing Germany's health policy during the COVID-19 pandemic. Prior to that, he was appointed Parliamentary State Secretary at the Federal Ministry of Finance in 2015.

Elected to the Bundestag at the age of 22 in 2002, Spahn was the youngest CDU member of the German parliament at the time.

== Early life and career ==
Spahn was born on 16 May 1980 in Ahaus, North Rhine-Westphalia. He grew up as the eldest of three children in the nearby village of Ottenstein. In 1999, he graduated from the Episcopal Canisius School in Ahaus. In 2001, Spahn completed an apprenticeship as a bank clerk at Westdeutsche Landesbank in Münster and worked in the banking sector until his election to the Bundestag in 2002. He was exempted from compulsory military service.

After becoming a member of the Bundestag, Spahn began studying political science at the University of Hagen in 2003. He earned a bachelor's degree in the field in 2008 and later completed a master's degree in political science in 2017.

== Political career ==
=== Early party positions ===
Spahn joined the Junge Union (JU), the youth organization of the CDU, in 1995 at the age of 15 and became a member of the Christian Democratic Union (CDU) in 1997. He has served on the Ahaus City Council since 1999. From 1999 to 2006, he was chairman of the Borken district branch of the Junge Union, and in 2005 he became chairman of the Borken district CDU.

In December 2014, Spahn ran for a seat on the CDU's national executive committee against then-Federal Health Minister Hermann Gröhe in a contest widely viewed as reflecting generational tensions within the party. His candidacy was supported by then-Federal Finance Minister Wolfgang Schäuble. Shortly before the vote at the CDU's annual party conference, Gröhe withdrew his candidacy, and Spahn was subsequently elected to the party leadership body.

=== Member of the Bundestag, 1999–present ===
Spahn was first elected to the Bundestag in the 2002 elections, representing the constituency of Steinfurt I – Borken I through a direct mandate. He successfully defended his seat in the 2005 and 2009 elections and has remained a member of parliament since then.

From 2005, Spahn held several key positions in the Bundestag's health policy structures, serving as deputy chairman of the CDU/CSU parliamentary group's health working group and chairing its Health Committee delegation. After the 2009 election, he became the group's health policy spokesman and led its working group on health affairs. He was also a member of the CDU/CSU parliamentary group's Young Group and co-founded a cross-party initiative promoting intergenerational fairness in Germany's Basic Law. Between 2005 and 2014, he held leadership roles in the German–Dutch Parliamentary Friendship Group and represented the CDU/CSU in health policy coalition negotiations after the 2013 federal election.

==== Parliamentary State Secretary in the Federal Ministry of Finance, 2015–2018 ====
In 2015, Spahn was appointed Parliamentary State Secretary at the Federal Ministry of Finance under Minister Wolfgang Schäuble in Chancellor Angela Merkel's third cabinet. At the ministry, he was responsible for overseeing parts of the annual budget process and represented Germany in negotiations concerning the annual budget of the European Union.

=== Federal Minister of Health, 2018–2021 ===
In March 2018, Spahn became Federal Minister of Health in Merkel's fourth cabinet. During his tenure, he played a central role in Germany's response to the COVID-19 pandemic and chaired the meetings of the EPP Health Ministers ahead of sessions of the EU's Employment, Social Policy, Health and Consumer Affairs Council (EPSCO). When Germany held the rotating Presidency of the Council of the European Union in 2020, Spahn chaired EPSCO meetings. In 2019, he travelled to several countries in sub-Saharan Africa to observe efforts to combat Ebola. In 2020, alongside North Rhine-Westphalia Minister-President Armin Laschet, he was invited by French President Emmanuel Macron to attend the Bastille Day celebrations in Paris in recognition of their assistance to French citizens during the COVID-19 crisis. In 2021, Spahn accompanied Macron during his state visit to South Africa as part of the German delegation.

Spahn's tenure as health minister was also marked by several controversies. In October 2020, shortly after warning publicly about private gatherings and social events as major sources of COVID-19 infections, he attended a dinner with CDU donors. Reports later raised questions about whether the event complied with pandemic restrictions and whether Spahn may have been infectious at the time. In March 2021, the so-called "Burda mask affair" became a political controversy after it emerged that the Federal Ministry of Health had purchased half a million medical masks from Burda, a company where Spahn's husband, Daniel Funke, had previously worked as an editor-in-chief and lobbyist.

=== CDU leadership election ===
Spahn was considered a potential successor to Angela Merkel and entered the CDU leadership race in 2018 after Merkel announced she would step down as party leader. At the CDU leadership convention, he received 157 votes in the first round, finishing behind Annegret Kramp-Karrenbauer and Friedrich Merz, and was eliminated from the contest.

Following Kramp-Karrenbauer's resignation as CDU leader in 2020, Spahn decided not to run for the position and instead supported Armin Laschet. Laschet won the CDU leadership election in January 2021 and was later chosen as the CDU/CSU candidate for chancellor in the 2021 federal election.

=== Deputy Chair of CDU/CSU Group, 2021–2025 ===
From December 2021, Spahn served as one his parliamentary group's deputy chairs, under the leadership of successive chairs Ralph Brinkhaus (2021–2022) and Friedrich Merz (2022–2025). In this capacity, he oversaw the group's legislative activities on economic affairs and climate protection. In the negotiations to form a coalition government of the CDU and Green Party under Minister-President of North Rhine-Westphalia Hendrik Wüst following the 2022 state elections, Spahn led his party's delegation in the working group on economic affairs, energy and climate protection; his co-chair from the Green Party was Mona Neubaur. Following the birth of his son with his husband via surrogacy in the United States, a scandal erupted as both the CDU and Spahn himself have opposed legalizing surrogacy in Germany, leading to him resigning as leader of the CDU in the Bundestag following the scandal.

== Political positions ==
Spahn is generally considered part of the conservative wing of the CDU, and has described himself as “liberal-conservative.” He has faced criticism over accusations that he supports a closer approach between the CDU/CSU and the AfD. In 2025, he argued that the AfD should be treated like any other opposition party in parliamentary procedures and committee work, a position that drew criticism from within and outside the Union. Spahn later rejected claims that he sought cooperation with the AfD, stating that he would not work with the party in its current form.

In June 2026, a data leak revealed that Spahn had participated in several meetings of the Dialog organisation, founded by U.S. entrepreneur Peter Thiel. According to the CDU/CSU parliamentary group, Spahn attended events in Ireland (2018), Italy (2019), Portugal (2022), Spain (2023), and Germany (2024). Some of the meetings took place during his time as Parliamentary State Secretary and Federal Health Minister. Spahn said he had no personal contact with Thiel at these events and was unfamiliar with the term “Dialog-Society.” His participation drew criticism from opposition parties and advocacy groups, who questioned his links to libertarian and conservative networks.

=== Social and human rights issues ===
An economic liberal and openly gay Roman Catholic, Spahn has combined a platform of lower taxes and less red tape with support for same-sex marriage. In 2012, he and twelve other CDU/CSU MPs united in their call for defending tax-law equality for couples registered in a civil union. In a public vote in June 2012, he pushed for such legislation as well as to open marriage to same-sex partners, but the bill was denied by his own party and eventually defeated. By 2013, Spahn and others considered signing on to a "group petition," in which they would publicly side with the opposition on expanding the rights of registered same-sex partnerships to include all the tax benefits given to married heterosexual couples. As health minister, he introduced a law in 2019 to ban conversion therapy on under-18s, or coercing, deceiving or threatening anyone older into such treatment. Violators can be punished by up to a year in prison, while advertising or offering conversion therapy carry a fine of up to 30,000 euros.

During the European migrant crisis, Spahn emerged as a vocal critic of Chancellor Angela Merkel's refugee policy, arguing that their party had "perhaps put too much emphasis on the humanitarian approach". In August 2024, Spahn supported a stop of asylum migration at German borders.

=== Pension policy ===
In April 2008, Spahn voiced his opposition to grand coalition plans to increase pensions because such a "gift" to the "medium and long-term retirees" would cost a "lot of money". He particularly criticized the arbitrary intervention of federal labour minister Olaf Scholz in the form of a surprise announcement on pensions formula. This statement brought him strong criticism, especially from the Senior Citizens Union (Senioren-Union). Spahn received many insults and threats in the form of anonymous letters, inter alia, and complained of this in the media. The Senior Citizens Union announced it would do everything to prevent his re-election, but Spahn received the support of former president of Germany Roman Herzog. After the 2013 federal elections, Spahn criticized the coalition pact between CDU/CSU and the SPD for making too many concessions to the SPD on lowering the retirement age from 67 to 63 for some workers. In November 2018, Spahn called for Childless Tax where Childless people should be paying much more towards care and pension insurance than those who have started a family.

=== Health policy ===
As part of coalition negotiations, Spahn and others succeeded in bringing "core demands for a black and yellow health policy" against the opinion of some like Rolf Koschorrek, in the form of a rearrangement of the Institute for Quality and Efficiency in Health Care (IQWiG). In order to do so, they asked for a "realignment at the top of the house staff". This is because the coalition agreement says that "the work of the IGWiG is checked" and "its decisions are respected". This came at a time when Peter Sawicki, the institute's director, had repeatedly voiced his opposition to the introduction of new medicine. Journalist Markus Grill wrote about "Operation Hippocrates", an alleged plot to replace Sawicki with a more pharmaceutical industry-friendly candidate. During his time in office, the German government introduced measure to make measles vaccinations mandatory for children and employees of kindergartens and schools.

=== Foreign policy ===
Spahn has called for Germany to reduce its economic dependence on China and diversify its trade relationships through agreements with other countries and regions, including Canada.

He is also a strong supporter of Israel. In 2018, he supported Germany changing its position on certain World Health Organization resolutions critical of Israel, moving from support to abstention. After the Vice President of the Bundestag, Aydan Özoguz, from the Social Democratic Party (SPD), shared a post of Jewish Voice for Peace on social media, he compared her in October 2024 to Nazi politician and military leader Hermann Göring. Spahn was criticised for this Nazi analogy.

== Personal life ==
Spahn is a Roman Catholic and has described himself as being in tension with some of the Catholic Church's teachings on sexual morality. He came out publicly in 2012 and has rejected the label queer, stating that he does not define himself politically by his sexual orientation.

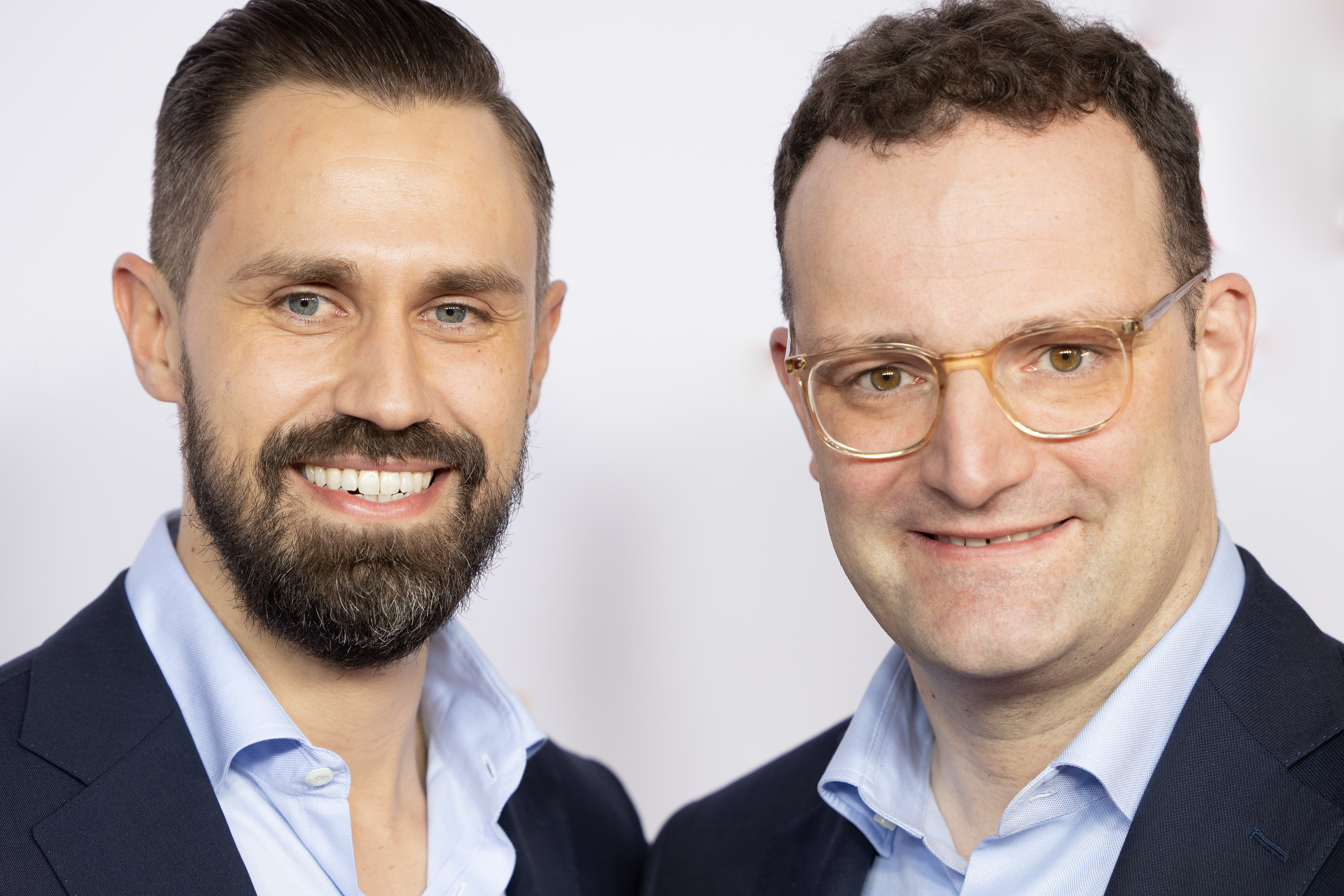
Funke (left) and Spahn, 2020

In December 2017, Spahn married German journalist and lobbyist Daniel Funke in a civil ceremony at Borbeck Palace in Essen, officiated by Mayor Thomas Kufen. The couple live in Berlin.

In July 2026, they announced the birth of their son through surrogacy in the United States, with Funke being the child's biological father. The announcement prompted public and political criticism because commercial surrogacy is prohibited in Germany, and Spahn had previously expressed ethical reservations about the practice as Health Minister. He responded that the decision followed years of personal reflection and described it as a conflict between his earlier convictions and his desire to become a parent. On 18 July 2026, Spahn resigned as chairman of the CDU/CSU parliamentary group, following criticism over his and his husband's decision to have a child through a surrogate mother in the United States while being opposed to it in Germany itself.

In 2021, Der Spiegel also reported on Spahn's financial affairs, including private real estate transactions and procurement decisions made during his tenure as Health Minister. Spahn sought legal action to prevent publication of certain details and requested the identities of journalists involved in the investigation.

== Other activities ==
=== Corporate boards ===
- Sparkasse Westmünsterland, member of the supervisory board (2009–2015)
- Mosaiques Diagnostics und Therapeutics AG, member of the supervisory board (2010–2012)
- Signal Iduna Pensionskasse AG, member of the supervisory board (2005–2010)
- Barmenia Insurances, member of the advisory board (2005–2008)

=== Non-profit organizations ===
- German Forum for Crime Prevention (DFK), ex-officio member of the board of trustees (2018–2021)
- World Economic Forum (WEF), member of the Europe Policy Group (since 2017)
- Deutsche AIDS-Stiftung, member of the board of trustees
- Jugend gegen AIDS, member of the advisory board
- Konrad Adenauer Foundation (KAS), member
- FernUniversität Hagen, member of the Parliamentary Advisory Board
- Magnus Hirschfeld Foundation, Member of the board of trustees
- Federal Cultural Foundation, member of the board of trustees
- Atlantik-Brücke, member
- Catholic Workers Movement (KAB), member
- Humanitarian Aid Foundation for Persons infected with HIV through blood products (HIV Foundation), chairman of the board (since 2018)
- German Federal Environmental Foundation (DBU), member of the board of trustees (2015–2018)

== Publications ==
- Jens Spahn, Olaf Köhne, Peter Käfferlein: Wir werden einander viel verzeihen müssen: Wie die Pandemie uns verändert hat – und was sie uns für die Zukunft lehrt. Innenansichten einer Krise. Heyne September 2022, ISBN 978-3-453-21844-4.
