= Anja Hajduk =

German politician (born 1963)

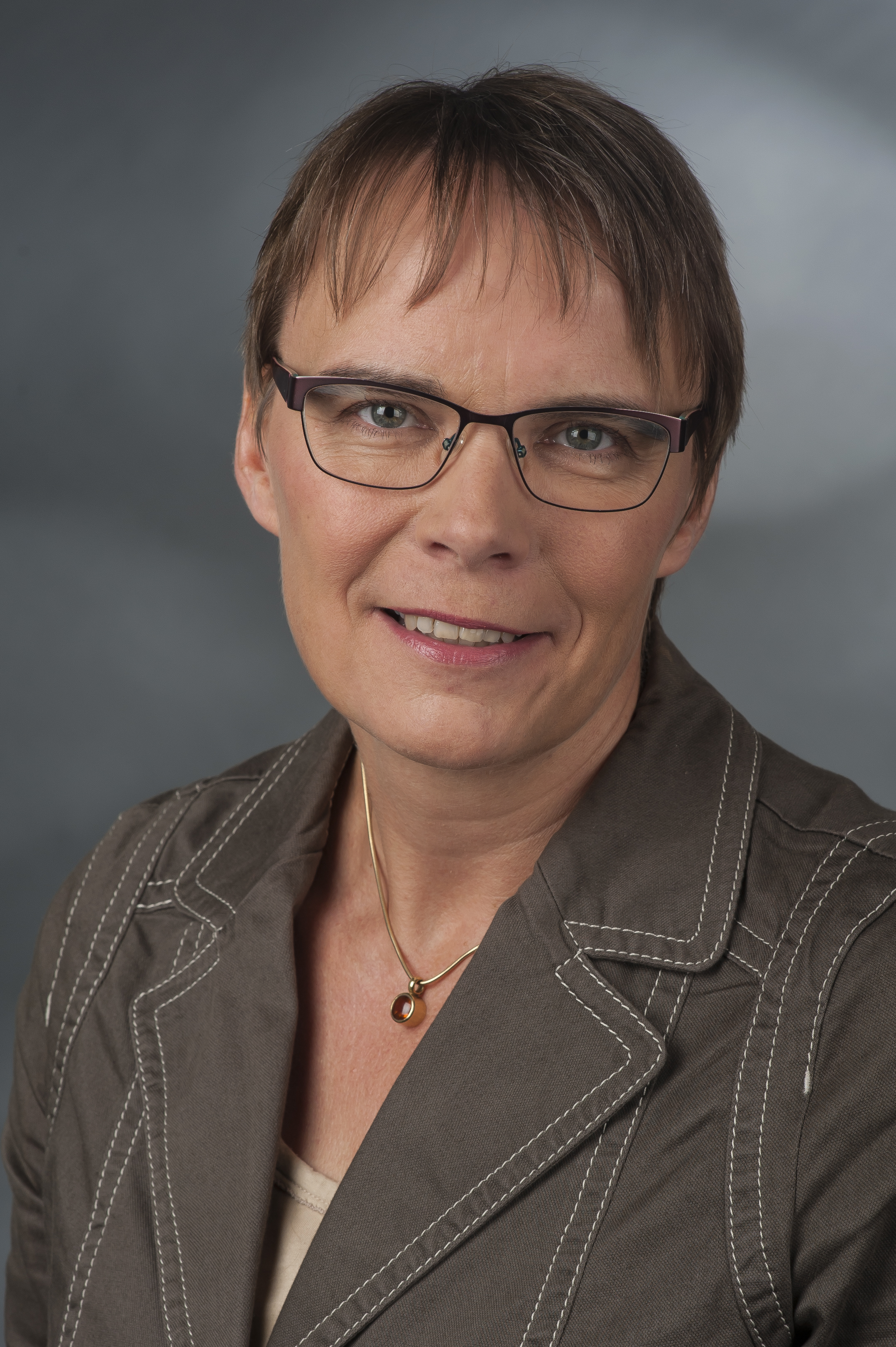
- Hajduk in 2014

Minister of City Development and Environment of Hamburg
- In office 2008–2010

Personal details
- Born: 8 June 1963 (age 63) Duisburg, Germany
- Party: Alliance '90/The Greens
- Education: University of Duisburg, University of Hamburg
- Website: http://www.anja-hajduk.de/

Anja Hajduk (born 8 June 1963) is a German psychologist and politician of the Alliance '90/The Greens who has been serving as State Secretary in the Federal Ministry for Economic Affairs and Climate Action in the coalition government of Chancellor Olaf Scholz since 2021.

== Early life and education ==
Hajduk was born in Duisburg and has three brothers. After completing her Abitur in Duisburg, she studied psychology in Düsseldorf and then in Hamburg from 1992 to 1998. Hajduk is a lesbian.

== Political career ==
From 1997 to 2002 Hajduk was a member of the parliament of the city Hamburg.

=== Member of the German Bundestag, 2002–2008 ===
From 2002 to 2008 Hajduk was a member of the German Bundestag. She was a member of the Green Party's parliamentary group, serving as deputy chairwoman of the Budget Committee of Bundestag and her group's spokesperson on the national budget. Between 2005 and 2009, she also served as deputy chairwoman of the German-Canadian Parliamentary Friendship Group.

=== State Minister (Senator) for City Development and Environment in Hamburg, 2008–2010 ===
From 7 May 2008 to December 2010 Hajduk was the Minister of City Development and Environment of Hamburg, serving in the state governments of subsequent mayors Ole von Beust (2008–2010) and Christoph Ahlhaus (2010).

=== Member of the German Bundestag, 2013–2021 ===
In the 2013 federal elections, Hajduk was again elected member of the German Bundestag where she served as Chief Whip of her parliamentary group. A member of the Budget Committee, she served as rapporteur on the budgets of the Federal Ministry for Economic Affairs and Energy; the Federal Ministry of Economic Cooperation and Development (since 2013); the Federal Ministry of the Interior; and the Bundestag; and the Federal Chancellery (2018–2021). From 2014 until 2017, she was also a member of the so-called Confidential Committee (Vertrauensgremium) of the Budget Committee, which provides budgetary supervision for Germany's three intelligence services, BND, BfV and MAD.

In addition to her committee assignments, Hajduk also served as deputy chairwoman of the Parliamentary Friendship Group with Australia, New Zealand and East Timor and as full member of the German-Chinese Parliamentary Friendship Group from 2013 until 2017.

In 2014, Hajduk was part of the Heinrich Böll Foundation's Commission on Financial Policy which developed a comprehensive concept on Germany's fiscal policy.

In September 2020, Hajduk announced that she would not stand in the 2021 federal elections but instead resign her seat by the end of the parliamentary term.

In the negotiations to form a so-called traffic light coalition of the Social Democratic Party (SPD), the Green Party and the Free Democratic Party (FDP) following the elections, she was part of her party's delegation in the working group on financial regulation and the national budget, co-chaired by Doris Ahnen, Lisa Paus and Christian Dürr.

== Other activities ==
=== Corporate boards ===
- Deutsche Bahn, Member of the supervisory board (since 2022)
- German Investment Corporation (DEG), Member of the Supervisory Board (since 2022)
- ic3s Information, Computer und Solartechnik AG, Member of the Supervisory Board (since 2012)
- mdex AG, Member of the supervisory board (–2015)

=== Non-profit organizations ===
- GIZ, member of the supervisory board (since 2014)
- Denkwerk Demokratie, member of the advisory board
- Heinrich Böll Foundation, member of the supervisory board (2002–2009)
- Institute for Federal Real Estate, member of the board of directors (2002–2009)
- Hamburger Symphoniker, member of the advisory board (2002–2007)
- Federal Financial Supervisory Authority (BaFin), alternate member of the board of directors (2002–2005)
