= Candidates of the 2025 German federal election =

This is a list of candidates for the 2025 German federal election.

29 political parties are contesting the election. There are reportedly 1,700 fewer candidates in this election than in 2021. The oldest candidate is 79 and the youngest is 17.

== Lead candidates by party ==
The Federal Chancellor is elected by the Bundestag on the proposal of the Federal President. In addition to this actual procedure, parties running for election put forward candidates who are intended to become Federal Chancellor if they win the election. Opinion polls take this into account in part by asking about the popularity of the Chancellor candidate.

The following are the top candidates for each party on the state lists:

=== SPD ===
Chancellor Olaf Scholz from the Social Democratic Party announced in 2022 that he would also run as the SPD's candidate for chancellor in the 2025 federal election. In addition to Scholz, Federal Defense Minister Boris Pistorius had also been considered as a candidate for chancellor based on popularity polls. However, Pistorius announced in November 2024 that he wanted to remain defence minister in a new government.

State	List leader	State	List leader
Baden-Württemberg	Saskia Esken	Bavaria	Carsten Träger
Berlin	Ruppert Stüwe	Brandenburg	Olaf Scholz
Bremen	Ulrike Hiller	Hamburg	Wolfgang Schmidt
Hesse	Sören Bartol	Mecklenburg-Vorpommern	Reem Alabali-Radovan
Lower Saxony	Lars Klingbeil	North Rhine-Westphalia	Rolf Mützenich
Rhineland-Palatinate	Tanja Machalet	Saarland	Esra Limbacher
Saxony	Kathrin Michel	Saxony-Anhalt	Martin Kröber
Schleswig-Holstein	Tim Klüssendorf	Thuringia	Carsten Schneider

=== CDU ===
In September 2024, the leaders of the CDU and CSU agreed on Friedrich Merz as candidate for chancellor. Minister-President of Bavaria Markus Söder declined. Hendrik Wüst had previously announced his withdrawal and pledged his support for Merz. Daniel Günther had also previously been named as a potential candidate.

State	List leader	State	List leader
Baden-Württemberg	Thorsten Frei	Bavaria (CSU)	Alexander Dobrindt
Berlin	Jan-Marco Luczak	Brandenburg	Uwe Feiler
Bremen	Thomas Röwekamp	Hamburg	Christoph Ploß
Hesse	Patricia Lips	Mecklenburg-Vorpommern	Philipp Amthor
Lower Saxony	Mathias Middelberg	North Rhine-Westphalia	Friedrich Merz
Rhineland-Palatinate	Julia Klöckner	Saarland	Roland Theis
Saxony	Carsten Körber	Saxony-Anhalt	Sepp Müller
Schleswig-Holstein	Johann Wadephul	Thuringia	Christian Hirte

=== Alliance 90/The Greens ===
For Alliance 90/The Greens, Annalena Baerbock announced in July 2024 that she would not run for chancellor again. Robert Habeck announced in November 2024 that he would apply for the candidacy. Both Baerbock and Habeck are expected to be their party's top candidates.

State	List leader	State	List leader
Baden-Württemberg	Franziska Brantner	Bavaria	Jamila Schäfer
Berlin	Lisa Paus	Brandenburg	Annalena Baerbock
Bremen	Kirsten Kappert-Gonther	Hamburg	Katharina Beck
Hesse	Anna Lührmann	Mecklenburg-Vorpommern	Claudia Müller
Lower Saxony	Filiz Polat	North Rhine-Westphalia	Britta Haßelmann
Rhineland-Palatinate	Misbah Khan	Saarland	Jeanne Dillschneider
Saxony	Paula Piechotta	Saxony-Anhalt	Steffi Lemke
Schleswig-Holstein	Luise Amtsberg	Thuringia	Katrin Göring-Eckardt

=== FDP ===
Christian Lindner announced in November 2024 that he would again run as the Free Democratic Party (FDP) top candidate in the 2025 federal election.

State	List leader	State	List leader
Baden-Württemberg	Judith Skudelny	Bavaria	Martin Hagen
Berlin	Christoph Meyer	Brandenburg	Linda Teuteberg
Bremen	Volker Redder	Hamburg	Ria Schröder
Hesse	Bettina Stark-Watzinger	Mecklenburg-Vorpommern	Christian Bartelt
Lower Saxony	Christian Dürr	North Rhine-Westphalia	Christian Lindner
Rhineland-Palatinate	Carina Konrad	Saarland	Oliver Luksic
Saxony	Torsten Herbst	Saxony-Anhalt	Marcus Faber
Schleswig-Holstein	Wolfgang Kubicki	Thuringia	Tim Wagner

=== AfD ===
In June 2023, Alice Weidel announced that Alternative for Germany (AfD) would nominate a candidate for chancellor for the first time. At the end of September 2024, the two chairmen Tino Chrupalla and Alice Weidel agreed that Weidel herself should lead the party into the election campaign as candidate for chancellor. In December 2024, Weidel was nominated as candidate for chancellor by the AfD's federal executive board; the party thus wants to nominate a female candidate for chancellor for a federal election for the first time. The nomination will be decided at the party conference in January 2025.

State	List leader	State	List leader
Baden-Württemberg	Alice Weidel	Bavaria	Stephan Protschka
Berlin	Beatrix von Storch	Brandenburg	René Springer
Bremen	Sergej Minich	Hamburg	Bernd Baumann
Hesse	Jan Nolte	Mecklenburg-Vorpommern	Leif-Erik Holm
Lower Saxony	Dirk Brandes	North Rhine-Westphalia	Kay Gottschalk
Rhineland-Palatinate	Sebastian Münzenmaier	Saarland	Carsten Becker
Saxony	Tino Chrupalla	Saxony-Anhalt	Martin Reichardt
Schleswig-Holstein	Kurt Kleinschmidt	Thuringia	Stephan Brandner

=== Die Linke ===
In November 2024, the Die Linke party announced the chairwoman of the Bundestag group Heidi Reichinnek and the new party leader Jan van Aken as its top candidates.

State	List leader	State	List leader
Baden-Württemberg	Sahra Mirow	Bavaria	Ates Gürpinar
Berlin	Gregor Gysi	Brandenburg	Christian Görke
Bremen	Doris Achelwilm	Hamburg	Jan van Aken
Hesse	Janine Wissler	Mecklenburg-Vorpommern	Dietmar Bartsch
Lower Saxony	Heidi Reichinnek	North Rhine-Westphalia	Sascha H. Wagner
Rhineland-Palatinate	Gerhard Trabert	Saarland	Moses Arndt
Saxony	Sören Pellmann	Saxony-Anhalt	Janina Böttger
Schleswig-Holstein	Lorenz Gösta Beutin	Thuringia	Bodo Ramelow

=== BSW ===
For the BSW party, founded in January 2024, the eponymous founder Sahra Wagenknecht is expected to be the top candidate.

State	List leader	State	List leader
Baden-Württemberg	Jessica Tatti	Bavaria	Klaus Ernst
Berlin	Oliver Ruhnert	Brandenburg	Friederike Benda
Bremen	Christopher Schulze	Hamburg	Żaklin Nastić
Hesse	Ali Al-Dailami	Mecklenburg-Vorpommern	Friedrich Straetmanns
Lower Saxony	Amira Mohamed Ali	North Rhine-Westphalia	Sahra Wagenknecht
Rhineland-Palatinate	Alexander Ulrich	Saarland	Desiree Kany
Saxony	Marcel Machill	Saxony-Anhalt	Michael Lüders
Schleswig-Holstein	Milad Salami	Thuringia	Robert Henning

== Candidates by constituency ==
=== Baden-Württemberg ===
State lists by party:

==== Larger parties ====
SPD		CDU		GRÜNE		FDP		AfD		LINKE		BSW	
#	Candidate	#	Candidate	#	Candidate	#	Candidate	#	Candidate	#	Candidate	#	Candidate
1	Saskia Esken	1	Thorsten Frei	1	Franziska Brantner	1	Judith Skudelny	1	Alice Weidel	1	Sahra Mirow	1	Jessica Tatti
2	Nils Schmid	2	Nina Warken	2	Ricarda Lang	2	Florian Toncar	2	Markus Frohnmaier	2	Luigi Pantisano	2	Manfred Hentz
3	Rita Schwarzelühr-Sutter	3	Andreas Jung	3	Agnieszka Brugger	3	Michael Georg Link	3	Martin Hess	3	Gökay Akbulut	3	Ralph Suikat
4	Martin Gerster	4	Ronja Kemmer	4	Sebastian Schäfer	4	Pascal Kober	4	Marc Bernhard	4	Vinzenz Glaser	4	Richard Pitterle
5	Katja Mast	5	Christina Stumpp	5	Sandra Detzer	5	Benjamin Strasser	5	Ruben Rupp	5	Anne Zerr	5	Cedric Schiele
6	Johannes Fechner	6	Alexander Föhr	6	Marcel Emmerich	6	Jens Brandenburg	6	Hans-Jürgen Goßner	6	Marcel Bauer	6	Anja Titze
7	Jasmina Hostert	7	Melis Sekmen	7	Zoe Mayer	7	Renata Alt	7	Jürgen Koegel	7	Amelie Vollmer	7	Monika Knoche
8	Parsa Marvi	8	Elisabeth Schick-Ebert	8	Harald Ebner	8	Ann-Veruschka Jurisch	8	Diana Zimmer	8	Ralf Jaster	8	Michael Jäger
9	Isabel Cademartori	9	Maximilian Mörseburg	9	Chantal Kopf	9	Stephan Seiter	9	Achim Köhler	9	Avra Enim	9	Karl-Heinz Beiter
10	Macit Karaahmetoglu	10	Lilly Hummel	10	Matthias Gastel	10	Martin Gassner-Herz	10	Lars Haise	10	Jürgen Creutzmann	10	Rainer Büttner
11	Derya Türk-Nachbaur	11	Klaus Schüle	11	Anja Reinalter	11	Konrad Stockmeier	11	Alexander Arpaschi	11	Nadja Schmidt	11	Susanne Alt
12	Lars Castellucci	12	Sarah Schmid-Nürnberg	12	Jan-Lukas Schmitt	12	Valentin Abel	12	Malte Kaufmann	12	Justus Heine	12	Hans Horn
13	Lina Seitzl	13	Christian Natterer	13	Anna Christmann	13	Julian Grünke	13	Joachim Bloch	13	Clara Meier		
14	Leon Hahn	14	Hermann Färber	14	Tobias Bacherle	14	Andreas Anton	14	Michael Blos	14	Thomas Hanser		
15	Lucia Schanbacher	15	Margaret Horb	15	Simone Fischer	15	Rainer Semet	15	Heinrich Koch	15	Nina Eisenmann		
16	Kevin Leiser	16	Carmen Alexandra Jäger	16	Jasmin Ateia	16	Anke Hillmann-Richter	16	Johann Martel	16	Maximilian Krippner		
17	Heike Engelhardt	17	Marie-Sophie Lanig	17	Jaron Immer	17	Anna Ortwein	17	Martina Kempf	17	Ellena Schumacher Koelsch		
18	Robin Mesarosch	18	Silke Kurz	18	Ann-Margret Amui-Vedel	18	Mark Hohensee	18	Sieghard Knodel	18	Marcell Menzel		
19	Franziska Blessing	19	Ellen Freudenmann-Habel	19	Jürgen Kretz	19	Dominic Frank	19	Paul Schmidt	19	Mara Zeltmann		
20	Lukas Hornung	20	Robert Märsch	20	Nina Wellenreuther	20	Nathalie Wagner	20	Sandro Scheer	20	Martin Auerbach		
21	Nezaket Yildirim	21	Vera Huber	21	Marin Juric	21	Akif Akyildiz	21	Benjamin Götz				
22	Jens Schäfer	22	Pauline Borchard	22	Sarah Heim	22	Tim Nusser	22	Dieter Glatting				
23	Argyri Paraschaki-Schauer	23	Karin Möhle	23	Sebastian Grässer	23	Jan-Felix Stöffler	23	Christine Schäfer				
24	Ludwig Striet	24	Gordian Felix Schwarz	24	Susanne Floss	24	Andrey Belkin	24	Christian Köhler				
25	Cornelia True	25	Leon Kolb	25	Andreas Ragoschke-Schumm	25	Eileen Lerche	25	Sebastian van Ryt				
26	Florian Zarnetta	26	Felix Ockenfuß	26	Asli Kücük	26	Mirwais Wafa						
27	Mirko Witkowski	27	Denise Marie Hradecky	27	Lars Maximilian Schweizer	27	Ben Dippe						
28	Assad Hussain	28	Volker Noseck	28	Jeanette Behringer	28	Christian Melchior						
29	Tim-Luka Schwab	29	Julia Mayer	29	Moritz Franz-Gerstein	29	Ruben Hühnerbein						
30	Sebastian Weigle	30	Rainer Staib	30	Rosa Buss	30	Mark Wieczorrek						
31	Philipp Hensinger	31	Dominik Apel	31	Ahmad Al Hamidi	31	Oliver Martin						
32	Tim Tugendhat	32	Lars Sakal	32	Elisabeth Schilli	32	Amir Ismaili						
33	Sebastian Gillmeister	33	Jessica Csikova	33	Jonathan Ebert	33	Sebastian Weber						
34	Dirk Flacke	34	Nico Ruß	34	Clara Wellhäußer	34	Chris-Robert Berendt						
35	Urs Abelein	35	Christian Kastner	35	Frank Konrad Brede	35	Philipp Berner						
36	Mario Sickinger	36	Silke Rombach	36	Thuy Nga Trinh	36	Laura Hahn						
37	Dietmar Bulat	37	Hero Katharina Merkel	37	Thomas Rink	37	Boris Kraft						
		38	Anette Groschupp										
		39	Valérie Mänder										
		40	Heidi Liebert										
		41	Felix Wiesner										
		42	Patrick Speiser										
		43	Ann-Kathrin Flik										
		44	Felix Lehmann										
		45	Daniel Funke										
		46	Patricia Schmid										
		47	Hans Dieter Pfohl										
		48	Athanassia Vassiliadis										
		49	Klaus Hoffmann										
		50	Alexandra Zink-Colacicco										
		51	Yannik Thomas Senn										
		52	Christoph Zalder										
		53	Stephanie Schmidt-Weiss										
		54	Lisa Domat										
		55	Tizian Mattes										
		56	Hasan Avci										
		57	Gerhard Lutz										
		58	Lance Neidig										
		59	Corinna Große										

==== Smaller parties ====
Bündnis C		BD		dieBasis		Free Voters		MLPD		ÖDP		Die PARTEI		Animal Protection		Volt Germany	
#	Candidate	#	Candidate	#	Candidate	#	Candidate	#	Candidate	#	Candidate	#	Candidate	#	Candidate	#	Candidate
1	Jürgen Graalfs	1	Ingomar Weber	1	Jürgen Geillinger	1	Sylvia Rolke	1	Franziska Schmidt	1	Guido Klamt	1	Max Braun	1	Lucia Lou-Ann Boileou	1	Inkeri Klomsdorf
2	Rainer Simon	2	Petra Hackl	2	Stephan Johne	2	Nadja Lützel	2	Monika Gärtner-Engel	2	Verena Föttinger	2	Ina Schumann	2	Bernhard Martin	2	Kien Nguyen
3	Jürgen Raphael	3	Günter Waldraff	3	Alexander Stängle	3	Stephan Schneider	3	Julia Scheller	3	Andreas Strecker	3	Janina Kern	3	Miriam Broux	3	Anna Polášek
4	Markus Bender	4	Jan Schumacher	4	Marcus Rohrbach	4	Norbert Volz	4	Dieter Reimold	4	Marion Schmid-Moeck	4	Hannah Wölfl	4	Bastian Röhm	4	Adrian Nantscheff
5	Ozren Vrsalijko	5	Sven Arndt	5	Christine Coelho	5	Maximilian Schiebel	5	Jonas Schraven	5	Dieter Baur	5	Jörg Lesser	5	Sandra Just	5	Celine Hirschka
6	Torsten Krause	6	Jan-Hinrich Guse	6	Brigitte Aldinger	6	Christina Hesse	6	Petra Braun	6	Gudrun Diebold	6	Daniel Gehring	6	Wolfram Goldschmitt	6	Cem Kont
7	Dorothea Fudickar	7	Jochen Holzmann	7	Jürgen Dorn	7	Leon Dold	7	Bernhard Schmidt	7	Harald Schuler	7	Felix Illert	7	Julia Papadopoulos	7	Elisa Hippert
		8	Lars Berg	8	Peter Hank	8	Wilhelm Sander	8	Marianne Kolb	8	Axel Jänichen	8	Marc Kadkalov	8	Andreas Parmentier	8	Mike Matthes
		9	Stefan Martin	9	Martin Loose	9	Harald Kubitzki	9	Philipp Schaaf	9	Uwe Olschenka	9	Peter Mendelsohn	9	Sonia-Ellen Lühring	9	Tonia Mack
		10	Thorsten Nickola	10	Patrick Coleman	10	Raphael Gawenda	10	Zahver Baumann	10	Sascha Fröhlich	10	Samis Ellsässer	10	Dennis Landgraf	10	Marius Dettki
		11	Frank Negwer			11	Jacqueline Plath	11	Elias Krieger	11	Christine Stankus	11	Corbinian Grimm	11	Moritz Riedacher	11	Selina Schmidt
		12	Robert von Radetzky			12	Joachim Förster	12	Johanna Jäckh-Vermeulen	12	Matthias Griesche	12	Sascha Oehme	12	Brigitte Parmentier	12	Pedro Treuer
		13	Olaf Steinfeld			13	Thomas Schalski	13	Ernesto Heidenreich	13	Sascha Albrecht	13	Patrick Schmidt	13	Eric Hartmann	13	Paula Geyer
						14	Julian Scharbert	14	Ursula Renner	14	Franz-Josef Behr	14	Joel Wertli	14	Ivana Marhöfer	14	Domenic Gehrmann
						15	Reinhold Bopp	15	Helmut Kruse-Günter	15	Franz Weber	15	Robin Tummescheit	15	Sebastian Knapp	15	Josepha Marie Kühne
						16	Julian Korbel	16	Katrin Paulus	16	Werner Kohler	16	Christian Brolich	16	Stephan Wicki	16	Patrick Fischer
								17	Thomas Völter	17	Gabriele Schuler	17	Werner Schmid	17	Maximilian Hengel	17	Jamie Pörsel
								18	Elke Weidner	18	Maria Göhring	18	Andrea Stadelmeier	18		18	Hasso Kraus
								19	Karl-Heinz Pauli	19	Matthias Dietrich	19	Lorenz Bierhalter	19		19	Beate Betgen
								20	Claudia Lenger-Atan	20	Claus Hammann	20	Martin Keller	20		20	Tassi Giannikopoulos

Five parties had their lists rejected:

- The Justice Party – Team Todenhöfer
- MERA25 – Together for European Independence
- Party of Humanists (PdH) – Facts, Freedom, Progress
- Party of Progress (PdF)
- Pirate Party Germany

=== Bavaria ===
Constituency	CSU	SPD	GRÜNE	AfD	FDP	LINKE	Free Voters	Other	Ref
Altötting									
Erding – Ebersberg									
Freising									
Fürstenfeldbruck									
Ingolstadt									
Munich North	Hans Theiss	Philippa Sigl-Glöckner	Frederik Ostermeier						
Munich East	Wolfgang Stefinger	David Rausch	André Hermann	Tobias Teich	Mahmut Türker	David Briels	Rolf-Peter Döll	Anna Schwarzmann (Volt)	
Munich South	Claudia Küng	Sebastian Roloff	Jamila Schäfer						
Munich West/Centre	Stephan Pilsinger	Seija Knorr-Köning	Dieter Janecek	Thomas Baack	Lukas Köhler	Nicole Gohlke	Richard Panzer	Alexandra Lang (Volt); Leonie Lieb (Independent)	
Munich Land									
Rosenheim									
Bad Tölz-Wolfratshausen – Miesbach									
Starnberg – Landsberg am Lech									
Traunstein									
Weilheim									
Deggendorf									
Landshut									
Passau									
Rottal-Inn									
Straubing									
Amberg	Susanne Hierl	David Mandrella	Peter Gerhard Gürtler	Peter Boehringer	Nils Jan Gründer	Marco Winkler	Hans Martin Grötsch	Susanne Maria Witt (ÖDP); Hans Josef Märkl (DieBasis) Markus Meier (Volt); Johannes Heinz Kotzbauer (BD)	
Regensburg									
Schwandorf									
Weiden									
Bamberg									
Bayreuth									
Coburg									
Hof									
Kulmbach									
Ansbach									
Erlangen									
Fürth	Tobias Winkler	Carsten Träger	Kamran Salimi	Bastian Treuheit	Daniel Bayer	Niklas Haupt	Andreas Scholz	Andreas S. Schmidtell (Volt)	
Nuremberg North	Sebastian Brehm	Gabriela Heinrich	Rebecca Lenhard	Roland-Alexander Hübscher	Katja Hessel	Titus Schüller	Robert Mahler	Christian Penninger (Volt)	
Nuremberg South									
Roth									
Aschaffenburg									
Bad Kissingen									
Main-Spessart									
Schweinfurt									
Würzburg									
Augsburg-Stadt									
Augsburg-Land									
Donau-Ries									
Neu-Ulm									
Oberallgäu									
Ostallgäu									
Memmingen – Unterallgäu	Florian Dorn	Marcel Keller	Joachim Linse	Simon Kuchlbauer	Daniel Steffen	Jennifer Merx	Michael Kroeschell		

=== Berlin ===
Constituency	CDU	SPD	GRÜNE	AfD	FDP	LINKE	BSW	Other	Ref.
Berlin-Mitte	Lasse Hansen	Annika Klose	Hanna Steinmüller	Hermann Priegnitz	Andreas Schaumayer	Stella Merendino	Sevim Dağdelen		
Berlin-Pankow	Franziska Dezember	Alexandra Wend	Julia Schneider	Ronald Gläser	Daniela Kluckert	Maximilian Schirmer			
Berlin-Reinickendorf	Marvin Schulz	Julian Holter	Klara Schedlich	Sebastian Maack	Marius Strubenhoff	Katina Schubert			
Berlin-Spandau – Charlottenburg North	Bernhard Schodrowski	Helmut Kleebank	Gollaleh Ahmadi	Andreas Otti	Dominik Hamann	Hans-Ulrich Riedel			
Berlin-Steglitz-Zehlendorf	Adrian Grasse	Ruppert Stüwe	Nina Stahr	Peer Döhnert	Henning Krumrey	Marcus Otto			
Berlin-Charlottenburg-Wilmersdorf	Lukas Krieger	Michael Müller	Lisa Paus	Martin Kohler	Christoph Meyer	Niklas Schenker			
Berlin-Tempelhof-Schöneberg	Jan-Marco Luczak	Sinem Taşan-Funke	Moritz Heuberger	Frank-Christian Hansel	Axel Bering	Stanislav Jurk			
Berlin-Neukölln	Ottilie Klein	Hakan Demir	Andreas Audretsch	Robert Eschricht	Max Klingsporn	Ferat Koçak			
Berlin-Friedrichshain-Kreuzberg – Prenzlauer Berg East	Kevin Kratzsch	Carmen Sinnokrot	Katrin Schmidberger	Sybille Schmidt	Sven Hoffmeister	Pascal Meiser			
Berlin-Treptow-Köpenick	Dustin Hoffmann	Ana-Maria Trăsnea	Annka Esser	Michael Gleichmann	Paulin Nusser	Gregor Gysi	Josephine Thyret		
Berlin-Marzahn-Hellersdorf	Mario Czaja	Ben Schneider	Maren Tepper	Gottfried Curio	Konrad Klamann	Katalin Gennburg	Oliver Ruhnert		
Berlin-Lichtenberg	Danny Freymark	Jan Zimmerling	Elisabeth Giesemann	Beatrix von Storch	Sören Henschel	Ines Schwerdtner	Norman Wolf		

SPD
#	Candidate
1	Ruppert Stüwe
2	Annika Klose
3	Hakan Demir
4	Ana-Maria Trăsnea
5	Helmut Kleebank
6	Sinem Taşan-Funke
7	Julian Holter
8	Alexandra Wend
9	Jan Zimmerling
10	Carmen Sinnokrot
11	Ben Schneider
12	Anna Dethlefsen
13	Jörg Nowack
14	Urte Wiemken

=== Bremen ===
Constituency	CDU/CSU	SPD	GRÜNE	AfD	FDP	LINKE	Volt	PARTEI	Independent	BD	MLPD	FW
Bremen I	Thomas Röwekamp	Ulrike Hiller	Kirsten Kappert-Gonther	Sergej Minich	Volker Redder	Doris Achelwilm	Lotta von Bötticher	Sandor Herms	Judith Schultz	Sebastian Kusch	Wanja Lange	
Bremen II – Bremerhaven	Sandra Schmull	Uwe Schmidt	Michael Labetzke	Arno Staschewski	Tiara Behrmann	Dariush Khorashad	Matthias Cornelsen			Christopher Albrecht	Lena Salomon	Katharina Büntjen

=== Brandenburg ===
State lists by party:

SPD		AfD		CDU		FDP		LINKE		Free Voters		Die Partei	
#	Candidate	#	Candidate	#	Candidate	#	Candidate	#	Candidate	#	Candidate	#	Candidate
1	Olaf Scholz	1	René Springer	1	Uwe Feiler	1	Linda Teuteberg	1	Christian Görke	1	Jörg Arnold	1	Corinna Mettler
2	Maja Wallstein	2	Hannes Gnauck	2	Knut Abraham	2	Matti Karstedt	2	Isabelle Vandre	2	Stefanie Gebauer	2	Jennifer Exner
3	Stefan Zierke	3	Norbert Kleinwächter	3	Saskia Ludwig	3	Ralf Tiedemann	3	Christin Willnat	3	Matthias Stefke	3	Axel Leonhart Burchardt
4	Sonja Eichwede	4	Götz Frömming	4	Sebastian Steineke	4	Robert Kellner	4	Robert Kosin	4	Michael Reichert	4	Robert Hanschke
5	Hannes Walter	5	Lars Schieske	5	Ulrike Mauersberger	5	Marie Luise Kretschmer	5	Annabell Rattmann	5	Sandra Raddatz	5	Ilona Wally Erna Rabeus
6	Ariane Fäscher	6		6	Désirée Schrade	6	Landelin Winter	6	Daniel Irrgang	6	Axel Reineke	6	Florian Geppert
7	Mathias Papendieck	7		7	Tabea Gutschmidt					7	Dave Korte	7	Alexander Dietmar Wietschel
8	Wiebke Papenbrock	8		8	Jana Schimke					8	Michael Stürmer	8	Torsten Mack
9	André Ullrich	9		9	Michael Rabes					9	Carsten Kupsch	9	Guido Gdowzok
10	Simona Koß	10		10	Rene Kaplick					10	Sylvia Conring	10	Andreas Wolk
11	Reyk Schulz	11		11	Larissa Markus					11	Georg Kamrath		
12	Anja Soheam	12		12	Werner Mundt					12			
13	Oliver Strank	13		13	Steffen Helbing					13			
14	Bianca Karstädt	14		14	Christopher Nowak					14			
15	Jonas Belke	15		15						15			
16	Sandra Nauck	16		16									
17	Eric Gallasch	17		17									
18	Angelika Syring	18		18									
19	Finn Kuhne	19		19									
20	Annett Jura	20		20									

Volt Germany		MLPD		BD		BSW	
#	Candidate	#	Candidate	#	Candidate	#	Candidate
1	Franziska Koch	1	Christiane Maria Fiebing	1	Mario Mieruch	1	Friederike Benda
2	Ted Moldenhawer	2	Leander Opitz	2	Marcus Grund	2	Stefan Roth
3	Cédric Jockel	3	Andrea Lingg	3	Marco Schulz	3	Elke Grabowski
4	Patrick Rützel	4	Antje Grütte	4	René Elend	4	Oliver Schulz
5	Patrick Achtenberg			5	Karin Kayser	5	Elke Löwe
6	Anja Petzold					6	Till Sickert
7	Jens Borsdorf						
8	Monique Zander-Scheel						
9	Florian Dickau						

=== Hamburg ===
State lists by party:

SPD
#	Candidate
1	Wolfgang Schmidt
2	Aydan Özoğuz
3	Metin Hakverdi
4	Dorothee Martin
5	Falko Droßmann
6	Lena Haffner
7	Susmit Banerjee
8	Shweta Sachdeva
9	Vladislav Litau
10	Alica Huntemann

=== Hesse ===
State lists by party:

SPD		CDU		AfD	
#	Candidate	#	Candidate	#	Candidate
1	Sören Bartol	1	Patricia Lips	1	Jan Nolte
2	Dagmar Schmidt	2	Michael Brand	2	Uwe Schulz
3	Armand Zorn	3	Michael Meister	3	Robin Jünger
4	Nancy Faeser	4	Anna-Maria Regina Bischof	4	Julian Schmidt
5	Felix Döring	5	Leopold Born	5	Pierre Lamely
6	Esther Dilcher	6	Stefan Heck	6	Christian Douglas
7	Martin Rabanus	7	Astrid Mannes	7	Thomas Fetsch
8	Natalie Pawlik	8	Klaus-Peter Willsch	8	Jan Feser
9	Philipp Rottwilm	9	Markus Koob	9	Nicole Claudia Hess
10	Melanie Wegling	10	Ann Kathrin Linsenhoff	10	Klaus Dieter Herrmann
11	Jens Zimmermann	11	Norbert Altenkamp	11	Holger Doktorowski
12	Nadine Ruf	12	Björn Simon	12	Jürgen Günter Mohn
13	Lennard Oehl	13	Katja Silbe	13	Clemens Johannes Hauk
14	Christine Ulrike Fischer	14	Jan-Wilhelm Pohlmann	14	Anja Swars
15	Daniel Bettermann	15	Johannes Wiegelmann	15	Ingeborg Horn-Posmyk
16	Laura Helena Wolf	16	Janna Melzer	16	Michael Rudolf Kuger
17	Andreas Larem	17	Frederik Bouffier	17	Kurt Gloos
18	Lena Friederike Voigt	18	Johannes Volkmann	18	Adrian Joachim Gohla
19	Sven Wingerter	19	Anna Bunting	19	Berthold Karl Hartmann
20	Julia Maiano	20	Pascal Reddig	20	Klaus-Peter Flesch
21	Daniel Iliev	21	Yannick Schwander		
22	Handan Özgüven	22	Katharina Elisabeth Wagner		
23	David Wade	23	Wilhelm Gebhard		
24	Michelle Susan Breustedt	24	Thomas Pauls		
25	Michael Neuner	25	Maren Hildebrand		
26	Laura Altmayer	26	Stefan Korbach		
27	Lino Rene Leudesdorff	27	Maik Fariborz Behschad		
28	Hella Ayubi	28	Bettina Wiesmann		
29	Ilyas Aydrus Yassin	29	Marcus Kretschmann		
30	Amelie Sophie Roese	30	Kai-Uwe Hemmerich		
31	Jan Moritz Böcher	31	Olga Martens		
32	Julia Rausch	32	Kevin Schmauß		
33	Florian Obst	33	Susanne Karoline Fritsch		
34	Sahime Dirican	34	Andreas Hofmeister		
35	Noah David Schollmeier	35	Jana Edelmann-Rauthe		
36	Ulrike Huf	36	Anne Franziska Jähn		
37	Liban Abdirahman Farah	37	Steffen Alexander Korell		
38	Sina Massow	38	Inge Cromm		
39	Christopher Ostrowski	39	Sabine Lipp		
40	Katrin Raab	40	Martin Carlo Giese		
41	Frederik Frimmel	41	Lukas Alexander Brandscheid		
42	Christel Keim	42	Veronica Fabricius		
43	Tiny Dietmar Hobbs	43	Juliane Eichenberg		
44	Lara Maraun	44	Torben Kruhmann		
45	Bernd Klippel	45	Ingeborg Drossard-Gintner		
46	Petra Göbel	46	Melanie Neeb		
47	Patrick Gebauer	47	Andreas Mock		
48	Monika Oertel	48	Albina Nazarenus-Vetter		
49	Benedict Heybeck	49	Michael Weber		
50	Dieter Falk	50	Ellen Neumann		
51	Tuna Firat	51	Anna-Maria Schölch		
52	Julian Stroh	52	Christian Lannert		
52	Frank Bernd Sibert	52	Lucie Maier-Frutig		
54	Wolfgang Friedrich Sax	54	Katrin Walmanns		
55	Niklas Keim	55	Hans-Jürgen Schäfer		
56	Patrick Tanke	56	Lisa Galvagno		
57	Sven Wellinger	57	Luisa Maria Westhoff		
58	Stephan Martin Müller	58	Jonas Kehr		
		59	Felicitas Beusche		
		60	Apolline Reimers		
		61	Simon Iolin		
		62	Anna-Lena Habel-Steinhardt		
		63	Rebecca Katharina Craes		
		64	Peter Stephan		
GRÜNE		FDP		LINKE	
#	Candidate	#	Candidate	#	Candidate
1	Anna Lührmann	1	Bettina Stark-Watzinger	1	Janine Wissler
2	Omid Nouripour	2	Thorsten Lieb	2	Jörg Cezanne
3	Deborah Düring	3	Alexander Müller	3	Violetta Bock
4	Tarek Al-Wazir	4	Ernestos Varvaroussis	4	Desiree Becker
5	Awet Tesfaiesus	5	Jochen Helmut Rube	5	Naisan Raji
6	Boris Mijatović	6	Viola Gebek	6	Finn Tizian Köllner
7	Ayse Asar	7	Peter Heidt	7	Magdalena Maria Depta-Wollenhaupt
8	Andreas May	8	Dennis Pucher	8	Thomas Völker
9	Mahwish Iftikhar	9	Philipp Ivo Kratzer	9	Daniel Winter
10	Michel Zörb	10	Carsten Seelmeyer	10	Silvia Katja Hable
11	Ilka Deutschendorf	11	Daniel Protzmann	11	Mariana Helga Schott
12	Maximilian Kohler	12	Lucas Schwalbach	12	Kilian Schüler
13	Marie-Louise Puls	13	Andreas Rethagen		
14	Philip Holger Schinkel	14	Alexander Maximilian Keller		
15	Aikaterini Garcia	15	Alexander Bartholomäus		
16	Joshua Edel	16	Frank Michael Maiwald		
17	Doris Jensch	17	Jan Peter Terborg		
18	Boris Wilfert	18	Markus Alexander Schmidt		
19	Stephanie Pilar Butte	19	Till Berthold Mansmann		
20	Isabel Köhler-Hande	20	Mathias Gerald Zeuner		
21	Sabine Häuser-Eltgen	21	Stephan Dehler		
22	Thomas Cord Gudehus	22	Katja Adler		
23	Fanny Maria Sackis				
24	Jan Marien				
25	Stefanie Pies				
26	Gregor Michael Beck				
27	Katharina Meixner				
28	Jacob Johannes Spanke				
29	Judith Rauschenberg				
30	Lars Nitschke				

Free Voters		Animal Protection	
#	Candidate	#	Candidate
1	Wilhelm Hartmann	1	Saskia Böhm-Fritz
2	Laura Schulz	2	Tim Standop
3	Cenk Gönül	3	Miriam Schönauer
4	Björn Feuerbach	4	Alexander Fritz
5	Rolf Leinz	5	Arnd Lepère
6	Stella Streit	6	Frank Kuczera
7	Markus Rainer Lappe	7	Barbara Niemeier
8	Liam Alexander Ulrich	8	Veronika Job
9	Anja Zilch	9	Tobias Misch
10	Heiko Becker	10	Marco Niemeier
11	Eike Stefan Kreft	11	Melanie Standop
12	Guido Becker	12	Marie Imgrund
13	Lorenz Berthold Helmut Faßhauer	13	
14	Axel Lecke	14	
15	Michael Maiweg	15	
16	Frank Bergmann	16	
17	Alfred Willi Münch	17	
18	Damijan Zečić	18	
19	Jörg Martin Leichthammer	19	
20	Bernd Fuchs	20	
21	Gökhan Özdemir	21	
22	Stefan Schefter	22	
23	Lukas Christian Mengel	23	
24		24	
25		25	
26		26	
27		27	
28		28	
29		29	
30		30	

=== Lower Saxony ===
CDU
#	Candidate	Constituency
1	Mathias Middelberg	Osnabrück City
2	Gitta Connemann	Unterems
3	Hendrik Hoppenstedt	Hannover-Land I
4	Anne Janssen	Friesland – Wilhelmshaven – Wittmund
5	Fritz Güntzler	Göttingen
6	Tilman Kuban	Hannover-Land II
7	Mareike Wulf	Hameln-Pyrmont – Holzminden
8	Carsten Müller	Braunschweig
9	Andreas Mattfeldt	Osterholz – Verden
10	Vivian Tauschwitz	Rotenburg I – Heidekreis
11	Stephan Albani	Oldenburg – Ammerland
12	Henning Otte	Celle – Uelzen
13	Cornell Babendererde	Harburg
14	Reza Asghari	Salzgitter – Wolfenbüttel
15	Vanessa-Kim Zobel	Stade I – Rotenburg II
16	Marian Meyer	Gifhorn – Peine
17	Michaela Menschel	Stadt Hannover I
18	Axel Knoerig	Diepholz – Nienburg I
19	Joachim Lübbo Kleen	Aurich – Emden
20	Christoph Frauenpreiß	Cuxhaven – Stade II
21	Lutz Brinkmann	Osnabrück-Land
22	Alexander Jordan	Helmstedt – Wolfsburg
23	Justus Lüder	Hildesheim
24	Constantin Weigel	Goslar – Northeim – Göttingen II
25	Bastian Alfons Ernst	Delmenhorst – Wesermarsch – Oldenburg-Land
26	Fabian Becker	Stadt Hannover II
27	Marco Schulze	Lüchow-Dannenberg – Lüneburg
28	Matthias Florian Wehrung	Nienburg II – Schaumburg
29	Albert Stegemann	Mittelems
30	Silvia Breher	Cloppenburg – Vechta

=== Thuringia ===
Constituency	CDU/CSU	SPD	GRÜNE	AfD	FDP	LINKE	BSW	Other	Ref.
Eichsfeld – Nordhausen – Kyffhäuserkreis	David Gregosz	Mohamed Sayed	Kai Klemm-Lorenz	Christopher Drößler	Marcel Hardrath	Donata Vogtschmidt	Robert Henning	Ilka May (MLPD)	
Eisenach – Wartburgkreis – Unstrut-Hainich-Kreis	Christian Hirte	Tina Rudolph	Heike Strecker	Stefan Möller	Leon Bender	Michael Lemm	Anke Wirsing	Fritz Hofmann (MLPD); Klaus Stöber (independent)	
Jena – Sömmerda – Weimarer Land I	Hendrik Blose	Holger Becker	Heiko Knopf	Stefan Schröder	Tim Wagner	Ralph Lenkert	Luca Saß	Anatol Braungart (MLPD)	
Gotha – Ilm-Kreis	Tankred Schipanski	Florian Wagner	Madeleine Henfling	Marcus Bühl	Martin Mölders	Sascha Bilay	Juliane Hein	Timo Pradel (Thuringian Homeland Party); Mathias Nicolai (Free Voters)	
Erfurt – Weimar – Weimarer Land II	Michael Hose	Carsten Schneider	Katrin Göring-Eckardt	Alexander Claus	Thomas Kemmerich	Bodo Ramelow	Gernot Süßmuth	Tassilo Timm (MLPD); Johannes Wollbold (Die Basis); Frank Michael Ruthmann (Free Voters)	
Gera – Greiz – Altenburger Land	Cornelius Golembiewski	Elisabeth Kaiser	Bernhard Stengele	Stephan Brandner	Marco Thiele	Frank Tempel	André Polter		
Saalfeld-Rudolstadt – Saale-Holzland-Kreis – Saale-Orla-Kreis	Diana Herbstreuth	Bastian Dohna	Astrid Matthey	Michael Kaufmann	Manuel Metzner	Mandy Eißing	Jörg Lohse		
Suhl – Schmalkalden-Meiningen – Hildburghausen – Sonneberg	Erik Thürmer	Raimund Meß	Manfred Kröber	Robert Teske	Gerald Ullrich	Philipp Weltzien	Thomas Schröder	Andreas Eifler (MLPD); Christian Horn (Pirate Party); Andreas Hummel (Free Voters)	

== See also ==
- Candidates of the 2021 German federal election
