= Lamely =

Lamely is a surname. Notable people with the surname include:

- Derek Lamely (born 1980), American golfer
- Pierre Lamely (born 1981), German politician
