= 2024 Baden-Württemberg local elections =

Local elections in Germany

- 9 June 2024

2,311 district council seats 18,562 municipal council seats
- Turnout: 5,186,560 (60.83%) ▲2.20%
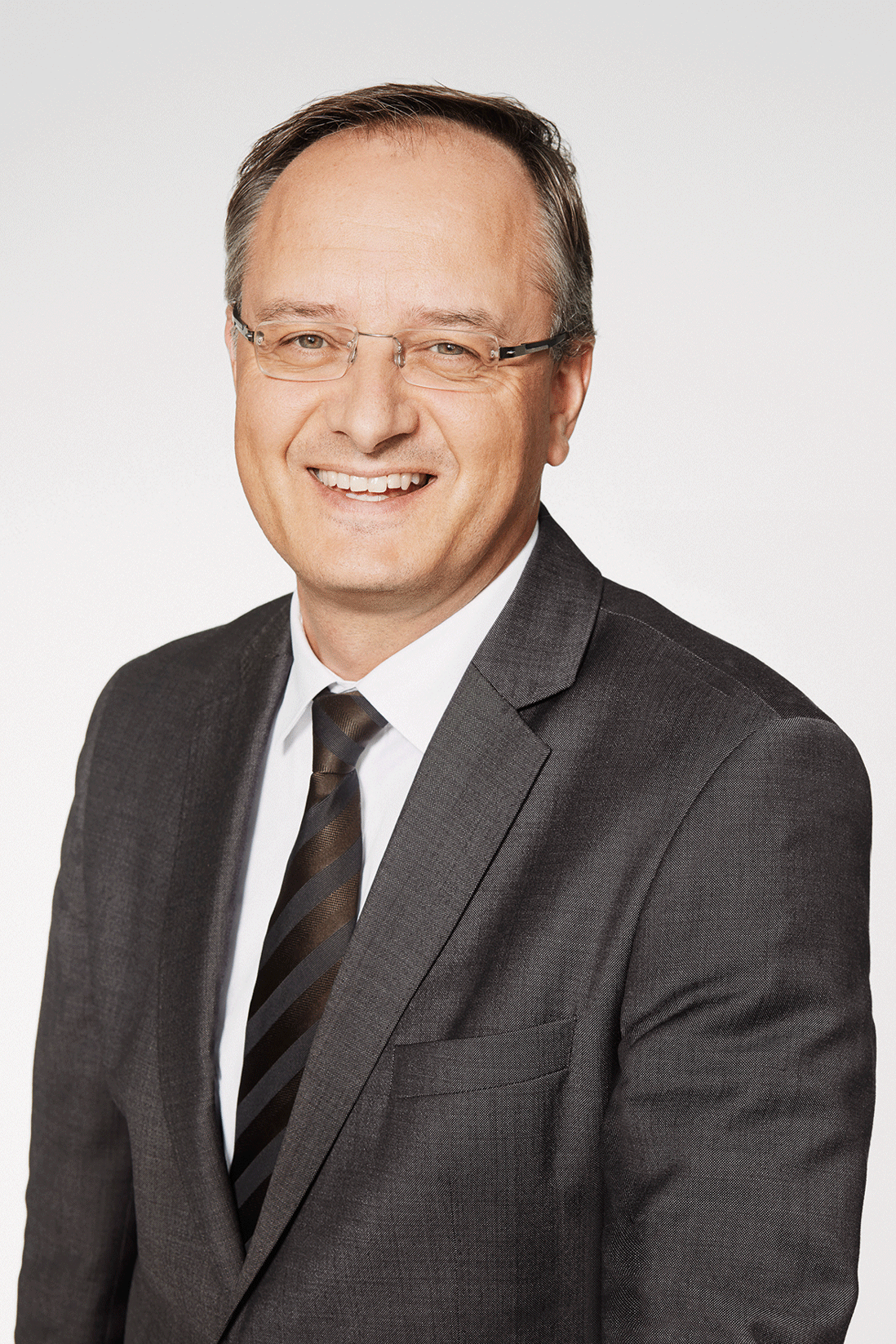

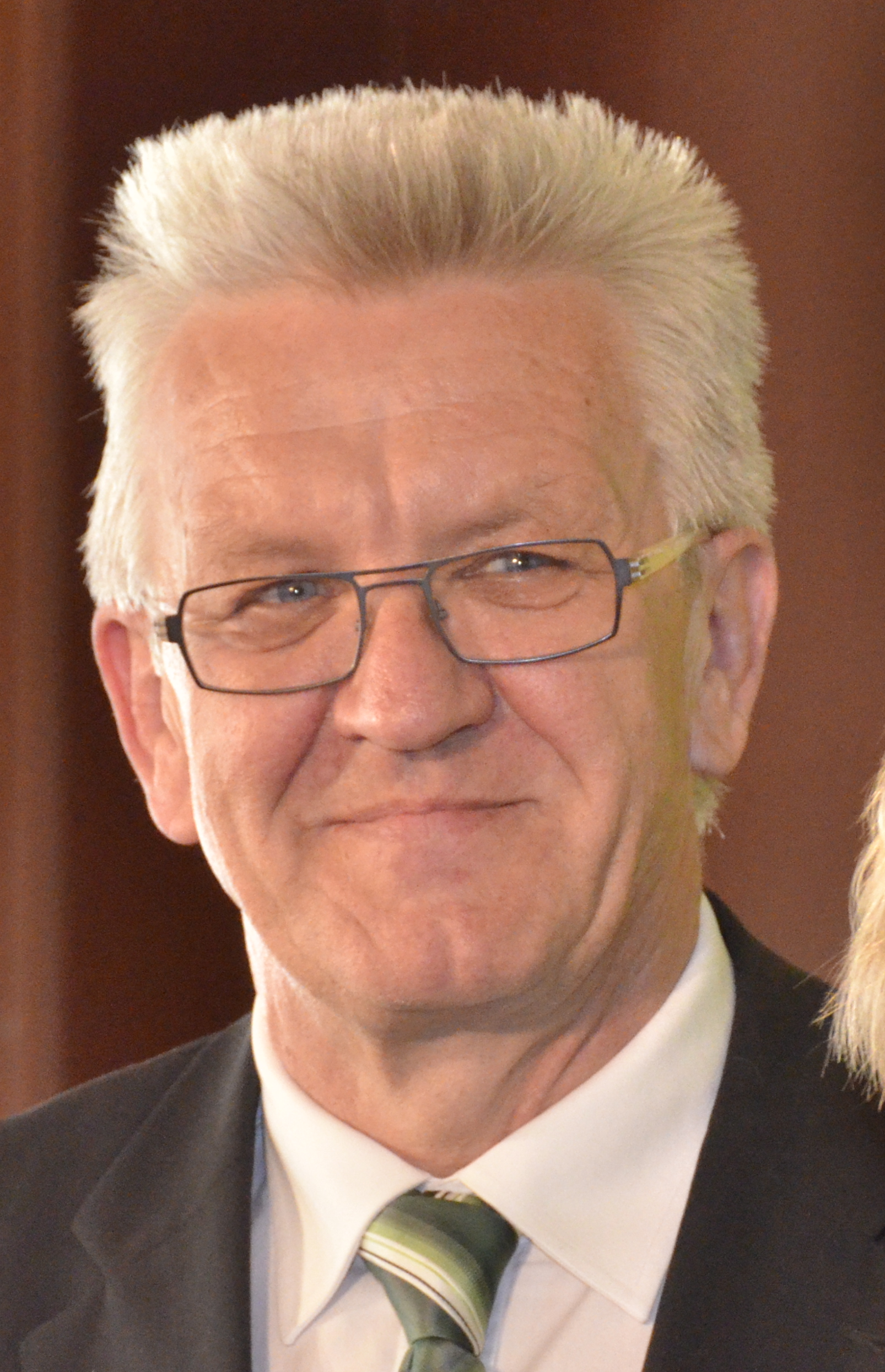

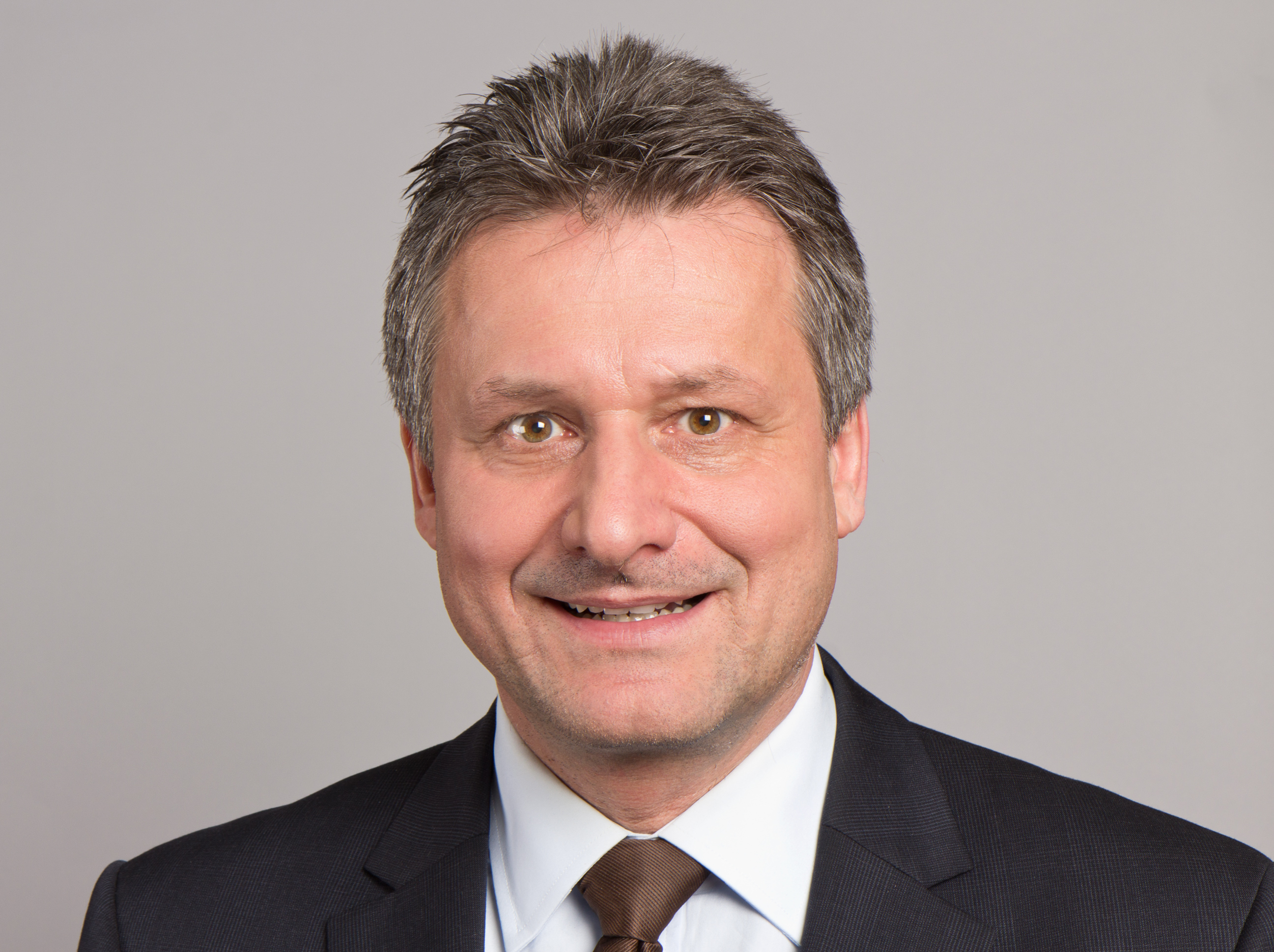

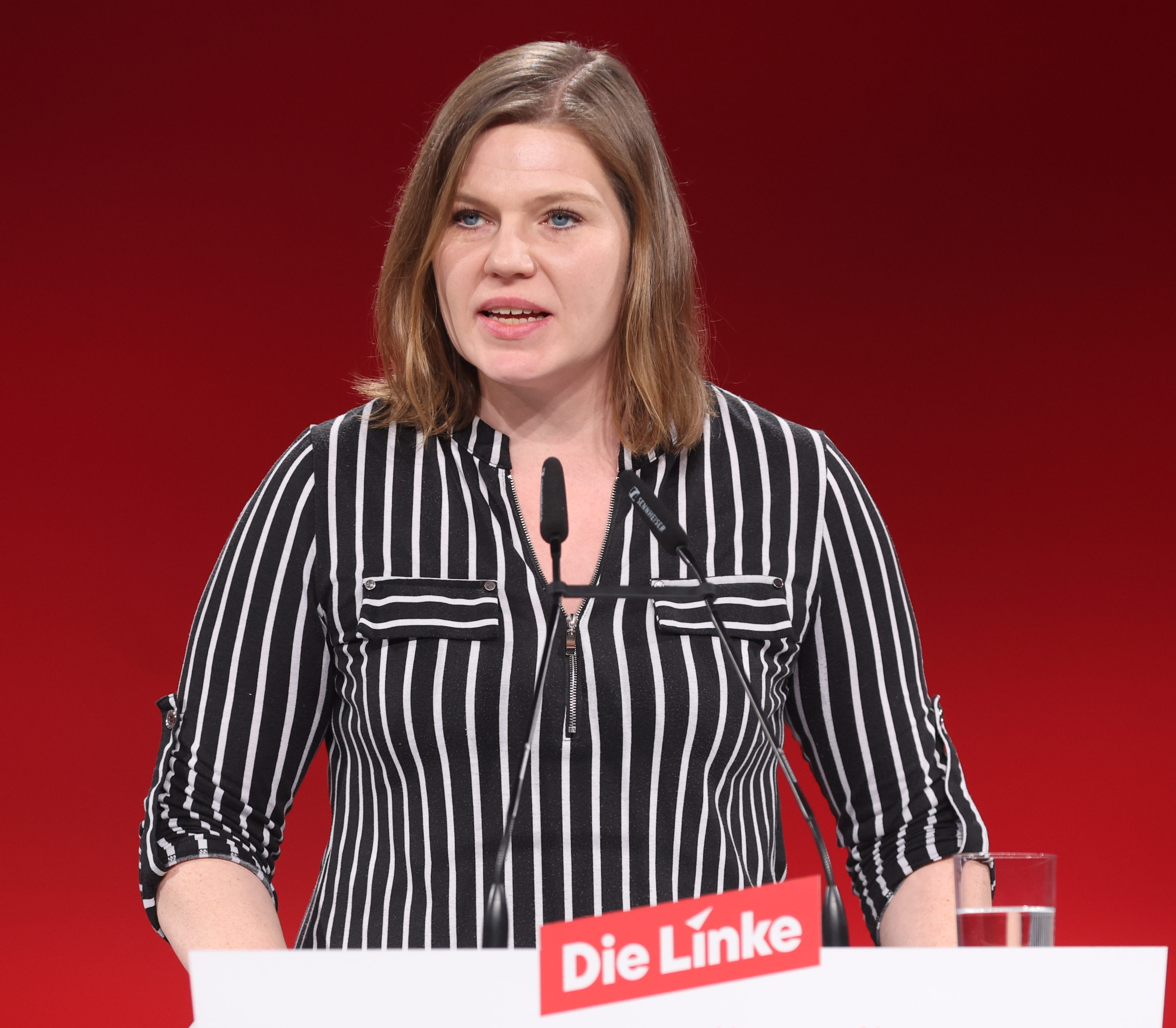
	First party	Second party	Third party
Leader	Manuel Hagel	None	Andreas Stoch
Party	CDU	Local voters' associations	SPD
Last election	642 seats, 28.26% 4,083 seats, 22.84%	550 seats, 24.40% 8,860 seats, 39.15%	322 seats, 14.00% 1,976 seats, 13.43%
Seats won	702; 4,007	561; 8,687	292; 1,650
Seat change	▲60 ▼76	▲11 ▼173	▼30 ▼326
Popular vote	1,214,266; 1,030,853	988,540; 1,697,596	511,371; 511,363
Percentage	30.12% 23.85%	24.52% 39.28%	12.68% 11.83%
Swing	▲1.86% ▲1.01%	▲0.12% ▲0.13%	▼1.32% ▼1.60%
	Fourth party	Fifth party	Sixth party
Leader	Winfried Kretschmann	Anton Baron	Hans-Ulrich Rülke
Party	Greens	AfD	FDP
Last election	385 seats, 17.49% 1,258 seats, 12.90%	125 seats, 5.55% 117 seats, 1.92%	138 seats, 6.20% 367 seats, 3.86%
Seats won	292; 1,077	277; 350	121; 315
Seat change	▼93 ▼181	▲152 ▲233	▼17 ▼52
Popular vote	514,031; 465,231	469,939; 181,598	212,429; 151,014
Percentage	12.68% 11.83%	11.66% 4.20%	5.27% 3.49%
Swing	▼4.81% ▼1.07%	▲6.11% ▲2.28%	▼0.93% ▼0.37%
	Seventh party
Leader	Sahra Mirow
Party	Linke
Last election	40 seats, 1.99% 63 seats, 1.35%
Seats won	27; 40
Seat change	▼13 ▼23
Popular vote	51,346; 42,251
Percentage	1.27% 0.98%
Swing	▼0.72% ▼0.37%

The 2024 Baden-Württemberg local elections were held on June 9, 2024, to elect members of Baden-Württemberg's 35 district councils and 1101 municipal and local councils. The elections were held on the same day as the 2024 European Parliament election in Germany.

== Background ==
All Germans and European Union citizens who have reached the age of 16 and have resided in their municipality for at least three months were eligible to vote.

For the first time, the full address of the candidates was no longer listed in the election announcements and on the ballots. This measure was implemented to protect candidates from harassment.

== Results ==
Following the election local voters' associations remained the largest political grouping at the municipality level and the second largest grouping at the district level. Meanwhile, the Christian Democratic Union (CDU) remained the second largest party at the municipal level and the largest party at the district level. The Social Democratic Party, Greens, Free Democratic Party, Die Linke all lost seats. Meanwhile, the Alternative for Germany (AfD) tripled its municipal representation, and gains were also made by a number of smaller political parties. Small parties that won district or municipal seats included: the Free Voters, Ecological Democratic Party, German Communist Party, Team Todenhöfer, Pirate Party Germany, Die PARTEI, and Volt Germany.

In the state capital, Stuttgart, the Christian Democratic Union received the most votes, followed by the Greens. The CDU also received the most votes in the cities of Mannheim, Ravensburg, Aalen, and Baden-Baden. The Greens received the most votes in the cities of Karlsruhe, Heidelberg, Ulm, Freiburg im Breisgau, and Tübingen. The Alternative for Germany placed first in Pforzheim and second in Rastatt and Göppingen.

Summary of results for the 2024 Baden-Württemberg local elections
Party	Votes (District)	%	+/-	Seats	+/-	Votes (Municipal)	%	+/-	Seats	+/-
Christian Democratic Union (CDU)	1,214,266	30.12	▲1.86	702	▲60	1,030,853	23.85	▲1.01	4,007	▼76
Local voters' associations	988,540	24.52	▲0.12	561	▲11	1,697,596	39.28	▲0.13	8,687	▼173
Social Democratic Party (SPD)	511,371	12.68	▼1.32	292	▼30	511,363	11.83	▼1.60	1,650	▼326
The Greens (Grüne)	514,031	12.75	▼4.74	292	▼93	465,231	10.77	▼2.13	1,077	▼181
Alternative for Germany (AfD)	469,939	11.66	▲6.11	277	▲152	181,598	4.20	▲2.28	350	▲233
Free Democratic Party (FDP)	212,429	5.27	▼0.93	121	▼17	151,014	3.49	▼0.37	315	▼52
Die Linke	51,346	1.27	▼0.72	27	▼13	42,251	0.98	▼0.37	40	▼23
Joint election proposals (Note: Electoral alliances between local voters' associations and political parties)	37,852	0.94	▼0.22	22	▼6	171,804	3.98	▲0.38	784	▲42
Other parties (Note: Including:Free Voters, Ecological Democratic Party, German Communist Party, Team Todenhöfer, Pirate Party Germany, Die PARTEI, and Volt Germany, among others)	32,156	0.80	▼0.15	17	▼6	69,682	1.61	▲0.67	77	▲26
Total	4,031,930			2,311	▲58	4,321,392			18,562	▼112
Invalid votes	112,019					153,329				
Voter turnout	4,338,972	62.42				5,186,560	60.83			
Eligible voters	7,064,954					8,526,601				
