= Kurt Kleinschmidt =

German politician (born 1967)

State Chairman of Alternative for Germany in Schleswig-Holstein
- Incumbent
- Assumed office 27 August 2022

Member of the Bundestag from Schleswig-Holstein
- Incumbent
- Assumed office 2025

Personal details
- Born: 7 February 1967 (age 59)
- Party: Alternative for Germany

Kurt Klaus Kleinschmidt (born 7 February 1967) is a former German military officer and a politician from the Alternative for Germany (AfD).

== Biography ==
Kleinschmidt hails from Bavaria and now lives in North Friesland. A former soldier, he had a military career including being stationed in Kosovo and Afghanistan. On 1 April 2022 Kleinschmidt became an armed forces reservist in the German armed forces. On 27 August 2022, he was elected chairman of Alternative for Germany in Schleswig-Holstein. In the Schleswig-Holstein state election in May 2022, the party had lost all their seats. In the 2023 local elections, Kleinschmidt was a candidate for North Friesland and Leck.

On 3 November 2024, Kleinschmidt was selected as the top candidate in Schleswig-Holstein in the 2025 German federal election. With 51 percent of the votes, party delegates elected Kleinschmidt to first place on the state list for the federal election. In the election he was elected.
