= Dennis Landgraf =

German politician (born 2001)

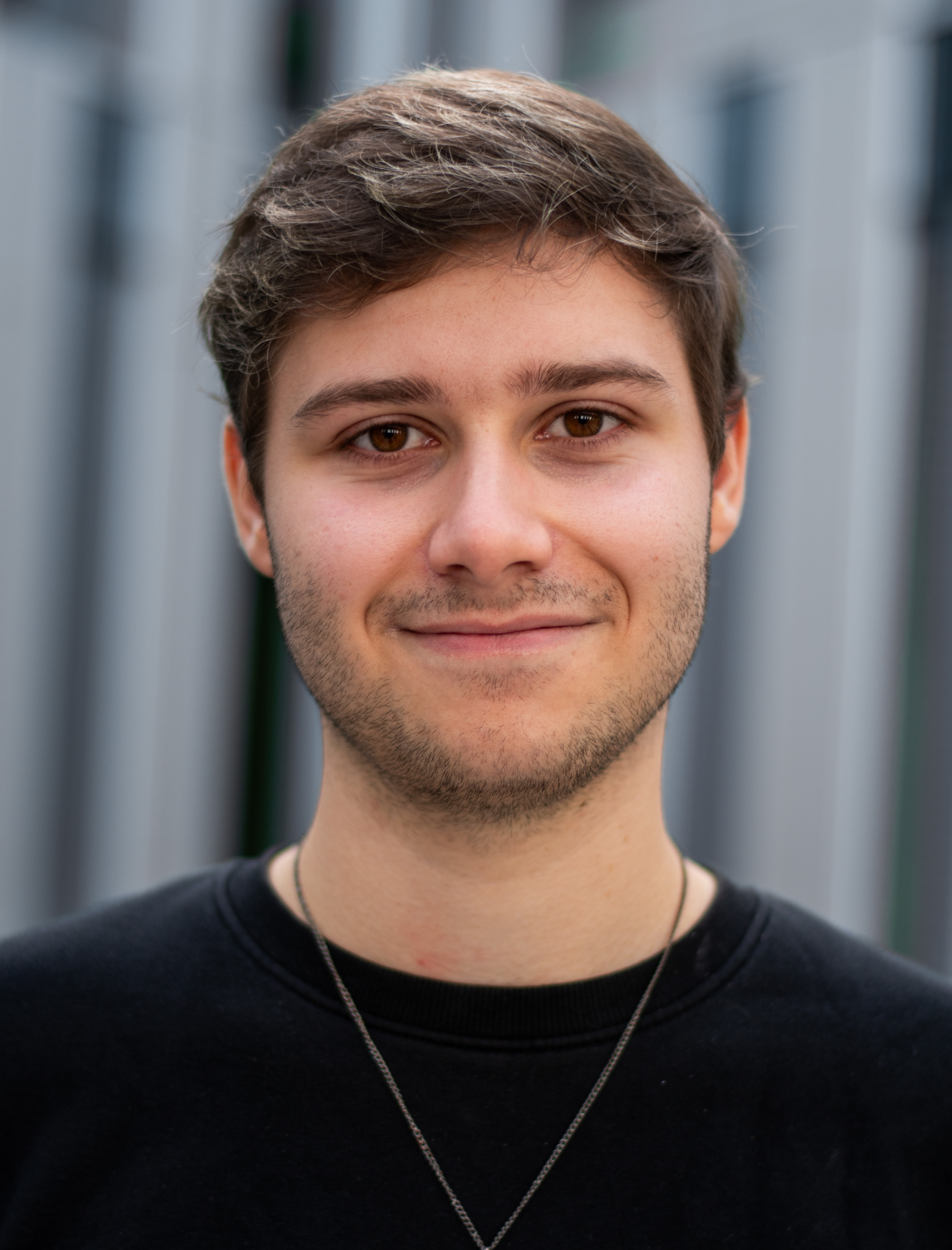
- Dennis Landgraf in 2024

Federal Chairperson of the Human Environment Animal Protection Party
- Incumbent
- Assumed office 2022 Serving with Paula López Vicente and Bernd Kriebel

Personal details
- Born: Dennis Shawn Landgraf; 26 January 2001 (age 25) Geislingen an der Steige, Germany
- Education: Stuttgart Media University

Dennis Shawn Landgraf (born 26 January 2001) is a German politician. Since October 2024, he has been one of three co-equal federal chairpersons of the Human Environment Animal Protection Party.

== Life ==
Landgraf grew up in Wiesensteig as an only child with his single mother. His parents originally came from the Ore Mountains. From 2018 to 2022, he worked as a media technician at Daimler. Since the end of 2022, he has been studying business informatics at the Stuttgart Media University. He has lived in Stuttgart since 2023.

== Political career ==
Landgraf initially became involved with Fridays for Future, where he served as press officer for the local group for many years. During this time, he organized events such as large demonstrations and campaigns. He was also active with PETA, working for them as an animal rights advisor.

In January 2024, he joined the Human Environment Animal Protection Party. In the local elections that same year, he was elected to the Stuttgart City Council, where he has served since. A quarter of a year later, he was elected as an assessor to the Baden-Württemberg state executive committee.

At the 48th Federal Party Congress, which took place on 5 and 6 October 2024, Landgraf was elected as one of three co-chairs of the party, alongside Paula López Vicente and Bernd Kriebel.

He was a candidate in the 2025 German federal election, listed tenth on his party's state list.
