= Marcel Machill =

German media scientist, journalist and politician

- Born: Marcel Machill; July 22, 1968 (age 58); Dortmund, Germany (then West Germany
- Occupations: media scientist, journalist and university lecturer
- Political party: BSW

Marcel Machill (born 22 July 1968) is a German media scientist, journalist and politician (BSW). He ran unsuccessfully as the top-candidate of the Sahra Wagenknecht Alliance (BSW) in the state of Saxony for the 2025 German federal election.

== Life and career ==
Machill was born in Dortmund to a bricklayer father and a pediatric nurse mother.

Machill is Professor of Journalism with a focus on International Media Systems at the University of Leipzig and holds the role of Chair of Journalism II. When he was appointed professor in 2002, he was the youngest holder of a chair for journalism in Germany.

As a scholarship holder of the German Academic Scholarship Foundation, Machill studied journalism and psychology in Paris and Dortmund and from 1997 to 1999 at Harvard University in Cambridge. In 1993 he received his diploma from the French journalism school Centre de formation des journalistes (CFJ) and in 1994 his diploma from the University of Dortmund. Machill received his doctorate in 1997 from the Chair of Media Policy and Media Economics.

As a journalist, he worked for numerous newspapers and television stations, including as a reporter and anchorman. In 1991 and 1992, Machill completed an internship and training as a radio editor at Deutsche Welle in Cologne and Berlin and worked at Radio France Internationale in Paris, where he presented a Europe Journal in 1993. He then worked as a freelance editor at Euronews-TV in Lyon and presented news and magazine programs as well as political reports. He also worked as a freelancer for WDR, ORB, Radio France and the ARD studio in Washington. He wrote a total of six articles for Die Zeit, Frankfurter Rundschau and Die Tageszeitung.

Before his appointment as professor in 2002, Machill headed the media policy department of the Bertelsmann Foundation. From 2004 to 2006, he held the chair for "International Journalism" at the University of Dortmund. His research and teaching focuses on cross-media in the field of electronic media, and he has also worked internationally as an expert and consultant, for example for the European Commission. Machill is a member of the selection jury for the McCloy Academic Scholarship Programme scholarship at the Harvard Kennedy School in Cambridge, USA. He is also a member of the national selection committee of the Fulbright Commission.

== Political career ==
In June 2024, Machill joined the Sahra Wagenknecht Alliance (BSW). He is considered the "chief advisor" for the party and took part in the exploratory talks with the Christian Democratic Union (CDU) and Social Democratic Party (SPD) on forming a government after the state elections in Saxony. According to participants in the exploratory talks, Machill was the one who decided to break off the negotiations. In the 2025 German federal election, Machill is the BSW's top candidate in Saxony. He was chosen unopposed by the party to be first place on the state list with over 75 percent of the vote. The BSW received less than 5 percent and did not enter the Bundestag.

== Other work ==
Machill works voluntarily as district chairman and district referee instructor in the Gütersloh handball district. As a handball referee, he referees men's games up to and including the association league, women's and youth games up to and including the premier league. Until 2019, he was a member of the executive committee of the Westphalia Handball Association as Vice President of Legal Affairs.

== Works ==
- 1997: Frankreich Quotenreich. Nationale Medienpolitik und Europäische Kommunikationspolitik im Kontext nationaler Identität
- 1997: Journalistische Kultur. Rahmenbedingungen im internationalen Vergleich
- 1999: Transatlantik. Transfer von Politik, Wirtschaft und Kultur. Mit Beiträgen von Helmut Schmidt u. a.
- 2001: Internet-Verantwortung an Schulen
- 2001: Internet-Hotlines
- 2002: Transparenz im Netz
- 2003: Wegweiser im Netz
- 2005: Suchmaschinen: neue Herausforderungen für die Medienpolitik
- 2005: 12 goldene Suchmaschinen-Regeln
- 2006: Online-Auftritte der Tageszeitungen
- 2006: Anzeigenblätter und Gratiszeitungen
- 2007: Die Macht der Suchmaschinen
- 2007: Media Industry, Journalism Culture and Communication Policies in Europe
- mit Martin Zenker: Youtube, Clipfish und das Ende des Fernsehens? Friedrich-Ebert-Stiftung, Berlin 2007, ISBN 978-3-89892-809-0.
- mit Markus Beiler: Wer beeinflusst die Auswahl der TV-Programme? Friedrich-Ebert-Stiftung, Berlin 2008, ISBN 978-3-89892-859-5.
- Journalistische Recherche im Internet. Vistas, Berlin 2008, ISBN 978-3-89158-480-4.
- Medienfreiheit nach der Wende. UVK, Konstanz 2010, ISBN 978-3-86764-267-5.
