= Chancellor candidate =

German political term

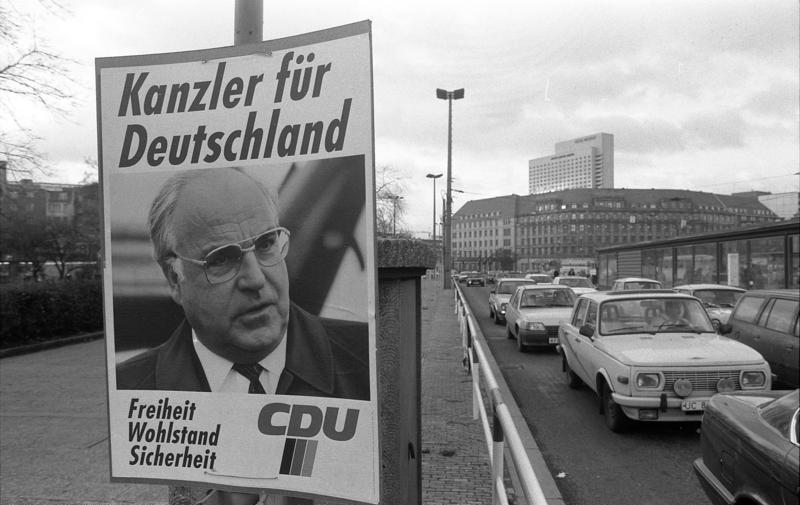
Election poster with Helmut Kohl, Leipzig in 1990. Kohl holds the record of having been a candidate for chancellor six times (1976 and between 1983 and 1998, the first time as leader of the opposition).

In German politics, the term chancellor candidate (German: Kanzlerkandidat) refers to the "lead candidate" nominated by a political party to become chancellor, should their party secure a parliamentary majority in a German federal election. By naming a chancellor candidate, a party signals that its parliamentary group (Fraktion) intends to elect this individual as chancellor in the newly constituted Bundestag.

According to Article 63, Paragraph 1 of the Basic Law, the chancellor is elected by the Bundestag on the proposal of the president. This process is particularly relevant at the beginning of a new parliamentary term, as the incumbent chancellor’s term officially ends at that point, requiring the election of a new chancellor and the formation of a new government, including a cabinet. Since a majority in the Bundestag is crucial for electing the chancellor, the larger parties traditionally nominate a chancellor candidate before a federal election to indicate to voters whom they intend to support for the position.

Smaller parties typically refrain from nominating a chancellor candidate. Until 2002, only the CDU/CSU and the Social Democratic Party (SPD) put forward chancellor candidates. However, in the 2002 federal election, the Free Democratic Party (FDP) did so for the first time, and in 2021, Alliance 90/The Greens also nominated a chancellor candidate for the first time. In the 2025 German federal election, a chancellor candidate was nominated by Alternative for Germany (AfD) and Sahra Wagenknecht Alliance (BSW) as well.

== Nomination ==
There is no regulated procedure for nominating a candidate for chancellor. In political practice, the major parties nominate their candidate for chancellor in the run-up to the federal election (up to a year in advance), often by voting at a party conference. The respective candidate for chancellor is the main figure of the party in the subsequent election campaign, even if they cannot be elected directly by the electorate; instead, their prospects of becoming chancellor are strengthened by the voters' vote, in that they vote for the candidate's party.

At the SPD party conference in Hanover in 1960, a German political party elected a candidate for chancellor for the first time. The candidate was the Governing Mayor of Berlin, Willy Brandt. The SPD strategist and long-time companion of Brandt, Egon Bahr, explained in retrospect that the then Bundestag member Klaus Schütz had brought this idea with him from the USA when he observed the election campaign of the Democratic presidential candidate John F. Kennedy.

With the exception of Angela Merkel in 2021, the incumbent Chancellor has always run again in the next federal election in order to be able to continue in office with the support of the voters. Nevertheless, there may be a discussion within the Chancellor's party about whether the incumbent should run again, as in the run-up to the 1998 German federal election, when voices were raised within the CDU calling for a "generational change" from Chancellor Helmut Kohl, in office since 1982, to CDU/CSU parliamentary group leader Wolfgang Schäuble.

The decision on a candidate for chancellor – a position with great media impact – can lead to strong disputes within the opposition party, as was the case in the run-up to the 2013 German federal election, when three names in the SPD were being discussed as candidates for chancellor: party chairman Sigmar Gabriel, chairman of the SPD parliamentary group Frank-Walter Steinmeier and former Federal Minister of Finance Peer Steinbrück.

The sister parties CDU and CSU nominate a joint candidate; so far the choice has fallen twice, in 1980 and 2002, on a candidate from the CSU (namely the respective party leaders Franz Josef Strauß and Edmund Stoiber). In the run-up to the 2002 German federal election, the term Chancellor question (or K-question for short) was coined to describe the decision between the two possible Union candidates for chancellor - CDU leader Angela Merkel and Edmund Stoiber. A candidate for chancellor who challenges an incumbent chancellor is usually the party or parliamentary group leader or head of government of one of the German states. At times when both major parties governed together at the federal level (grand coalition), federal ministers or the incumbent deputies of the chancellor usually stood as candidates for chancellor. An exception was Hans-Jochen Vogel, who at the time of his candidacy for chancellor in 1983 was only a member of the House of Representatives of (West) Berlin (but he had previously been a federal minister for many years). The candidate for chancellor is usually given first place on the state list by his home state association.

Gerhard Schröder and Olaf Scholz are the only Federal Chancellors who came into office after a federal election as candidates for chancellor who differed from the party chairmanship; as incumbents, Ludwig Erhard and Helmut Schmidt each successfully ran for re-election without the party chairmanship, but Gerhard Schröder was unsuccessful.

== History ==
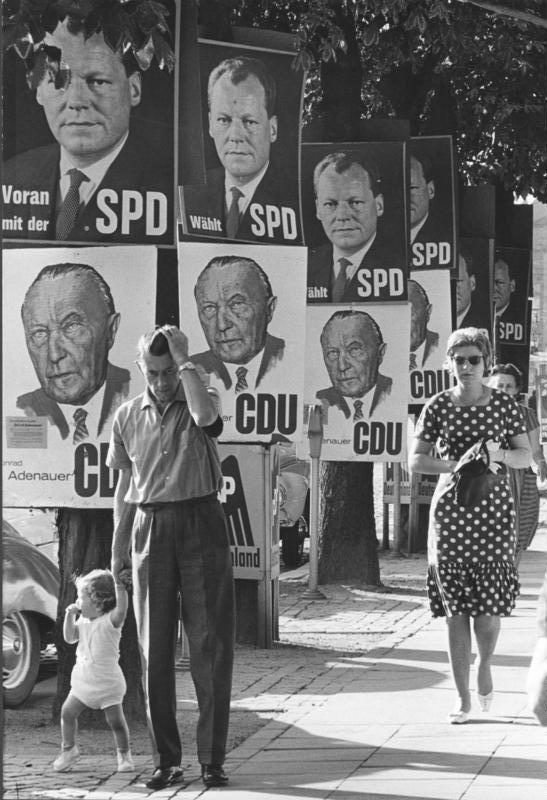
Election posters 1961 with portraits of Chancellor candidate Willy Brandt (SPD) and Chancellor Konrad Adenauer (CDU)

In the North German Confederation and the German Empire (1871–1918), the Chancellor was appointed by the German Emperor; the people and the Reichstag elected by them had no say in the appointment of this office. In the Weimar Republic (1918–1933), the Reichstag was granted a destructive vote of no confidence, which led to the resignation of the Chancellor, while the appointment of the Chancellor remained the responsibility of the head of state, the Reich President. Accordingly, the nomination of candidates for Chancellor was not yet common practice, any more than it was in the first years of the Federal Republic after 1949; the nomination of a Chancellor was rather a subject of coalition negotiations and was only carried out after the election by the winning party alliance.

A development that only came to a provisional conclusion in the course of the 1950s brought about a change here: the concentration of voters on a few competitive parties and the associated development of the CDU, CSU and SPD into large popular parties with the prospect of an absolute majority of seats in parliament or an alliance with a smaller coalition partner. Only now could these parties realistically claim that their candidate would actually be elected Chancellor in the event of an election victory. Before Willy Brandt was expressly nominated as a candidate for Chancellor for the first time in 1960, the respective party and parliamentary group leaders of the opposition were considered "natural" candidates.

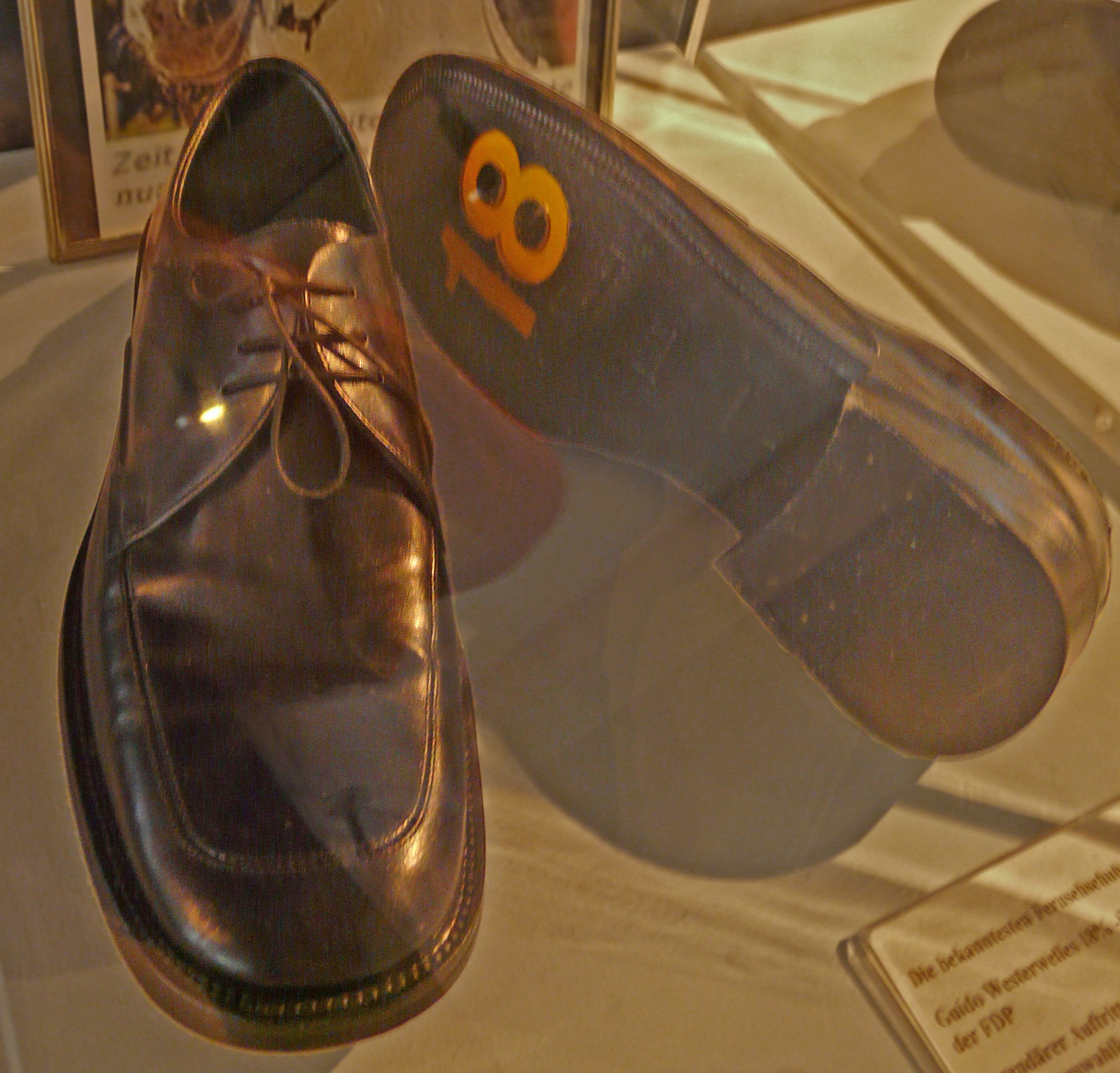
In 2002, FDP chairman Guido Westerwelle presented himself as a candidate for chancellor in accordance with "Strategy 18", with the aim of receiving 18 percent of the vote. He received 7.4 percent.

After the nomination of a candidate for chancellor had long been made only by the two major parties represented in the Bundestag, the CDU/CSU and SPD, the FDP also nominated a candidate for chancellor for the first time in the 2002 German federal election with its chairman Guido Westerwelle. The nomination was made with the aim of appearing in a personalized media environment on an equal footing with the candidates for chancellor Gerhard Schröder (SPD) and Edmund Stoiber (CDU/CSU), and as a supplement to the official election goal of achieving 18 percent of the second vote ("Strategy 18”). The attempt to force participation in the television debates (Fernsehduell) of the candidates Schröder and Stoiber by means of a court decision resulted in a defeat for the FDP before the Federal Constitutional Court:

"Accordingly, the participation of the complainant's chairman is ruled out because - which the complainant herself does not ultimately dispute - he has no realistic prospect of taking over the office of Federal Chancellor after the election on 22 September 2002."

— Extract from the court decision

Guido Westerwelle’s appearance as candidate for chancellor was commented on by the media in a critical and even malicious manner; even Westerwelle himself later described his nomination as "candidate for chancellor" as a mistake.

For the 2021 German federal election, Annalena Baerbock was nominated as the first candidate for chancellor by Alliance 90/The Greens, after the party was continuously certified as the second strongest force after the CDU/CSU and thus also ahead of the SPD from around October 2018 to July 2021. However, the high poll ratings could not be confirmed in the election, as the Greens only became the third strongest force, while the SPD with its candidate Olaf Scholz even narrowly won the election ahead of the CDU/CSU. After the election, however, the party became part of the traffic light coalition under Scholz and provided the Vice Chancellor with Economics Minister Robert Habeck, while Baerbock was appointed Foreign Minister.

For the 2025 German federal election, the AfD nominated its first female candidate for chancellor, Alice Weidel. In the run-up to the election, the AfD had consistently ranked second in polls behind the CDU/CSU. The BSW followed suit with the appointment of Sahra Wagenknecht.

== Chancellor candidates since 1949 ==
The following table lists all lead candidates (or "chancellor candidates" from the 1961 federal election) who have stood for the major parties CDU/CSU and SPD in federal elections since 1949. In addition, the FDP's candidacy for chancellor in 2002 and the candidacies for chancellor of Alliance 90/The Greens since 2021 are listed. In 2025, the AfD and BSW put forward a female candidate for chancellor for the first time.

Chancellor candidates (until 1957: Spitzenkandidaten)
| Election | CDU/CSU | SPD | FDP | Grüne | AfD | BSW |
|---|---|---|---|---|---|---|
| 1949 | Konrad Adenauer | Kurt Schumacher | | | | |
| 1953 | Konrad Adenauer | Erich Ollenhauer | | | | |
| 1957 | Konrad Adenauer | Erich Ollenhauer | | | | |
| 1961 | Konrad Adenauer | Willy Brandt | | | | |
| 1965 | Ludwig Erhard | Willy Brandt | | | | |
| 1969 | Kurt Georg Kiesinger | Willy Brandt | | | | |
| 1972 | Rainer Barzel | Willy Brandt | | | | |
| 1976 | Helmut Kohl | Helmut Schmidt | | | | |
| 1980 | Franz Josef Strauß | Helmut Schmidt | | | | |
| 1983 | Helmut Kohl | Hans-Jochen Vogel | | | | |
| 1987 | Helmut Kohl | Johannes Rau | | | | |
| 1990 | Helmut Kohl | Oskar Lafontaine | | | | |
| 1994 | Helmut Kohl | Rudolf Scharping | | | | |
| 1998 | Helmut Kohl | Gerhard Schröder | | | | |
| 2002 | Edmund Stoiber | Gerhard Schröder | Guido Westerwelle | | | |
| 2005 | Angela Merkel | Gerhard Schröder | | | | |
| 2009 | Angela Merkel | Frank-Walter Steinmeier | | | | |
| 2013 | Angela Merkel | Peer Steinbrück | | | | |
| 2017 | Angela Merkel | Martin Schulz | | | | |
| 2021 | Armin Laschet | Olaf Scholz | | Annalena Baerbock | | |
| 2025 | Friedrich Merz | Olaf Scholz | | Robert Habeck | Alice Weidel | Sahra Wagenknecht |

== See also ==
- Presidential candidate
- Shadow cabinet

== Literature ==
- Daniela Forkmann, Saskia Richter (Hrsg.): Gescheiterte Kanzlerkandidaten. Von Kurt Schumacher bis Edmund Stoiber. VS Verlag, Wiesbaden 2007, ISBN 978-3-531-15051-2.
