= Gerhard Trabert =

German public figure (born 1956)

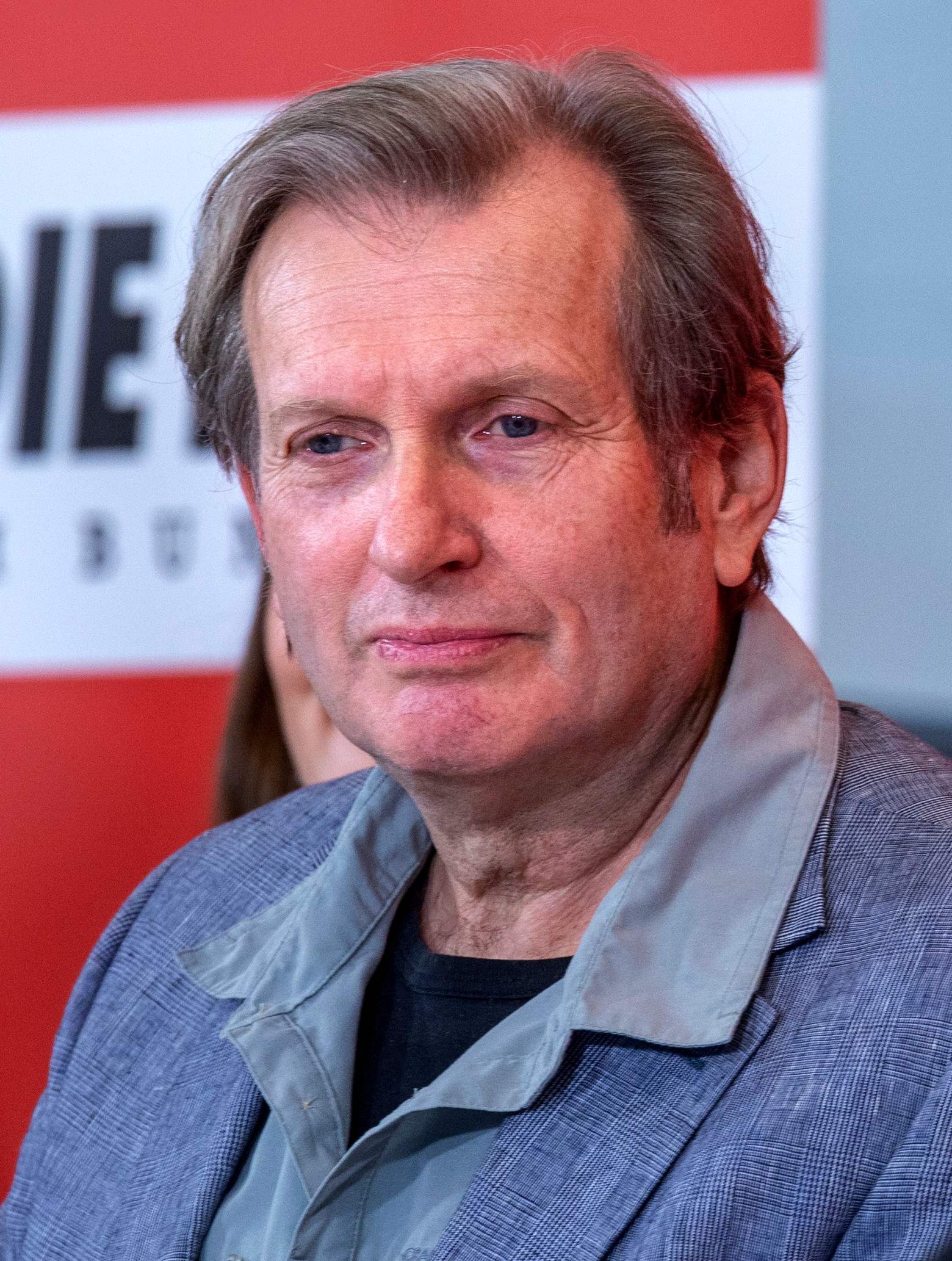
- Trabert in 2022

Member of the Bundestag for Rhineland-Palatinate
- Incumbent
- Assumed office TBD
- Constituency: The Left Party List

Personal details
- Born: Gerhard Max Trabert; 3 July 1956 (age 70) Mainz, West Germany
- Party: The Left (since 2021)
- Education: University of Mainz
- Occupation: Psychiatrist • Politician

Gerhard Max Trabert (born 3 July 1956) is a German public figure. By profession he is a general practitioner and emergency medicine doctor but is also known as a professor of social medicine and social psychiatry, as well as an author of books. In the 1970s, he was involved in professional sports.

He was also a political candidate for Die Linke in the 2022 German presidential election and the 2021 German federal election. He was the top candidate on the Rhineland-Palatinate state list in the 2025 German federal election.

== Life and work ==
Gerhard Trabert was born in Mainz in July 1956. During his childhood, he spent a lot of time in the orphanage where his father worked as an educator. This experience made him aware of the suffering felt by disadvantaged people at an early age.

Trabert studied social work at the Wiesbaden University of Applied Sciences from 1975 to 1979, graduating with a degree in social education. After completing his studies, Trabert worked in medical social work. In 1983 he began studying human medicine, which he completed in 1989 at the Johannes Gutenberg University in Mainz. During his studies, Trabert received a scholarship from the Evangelisches Studienwerk Villigst. After completing his studies, Trabert was awarded a doctorate in medicine by the medical faculty of the University of Mainz with his dissertation on the health situation and medical care of homeless people. Trabert worked clinically for ten years in hospitals in Rhineland-Palatinate and Hesse. His focus was internal medicine, specifically the medical and psychosocial care of oncology patients. He trained as a general practitioner for family medicine and as an emergency medicine doctor. From the beginning of his medical career, he completed numerous assignments abroad, including in India, Bangladesh and the United States.

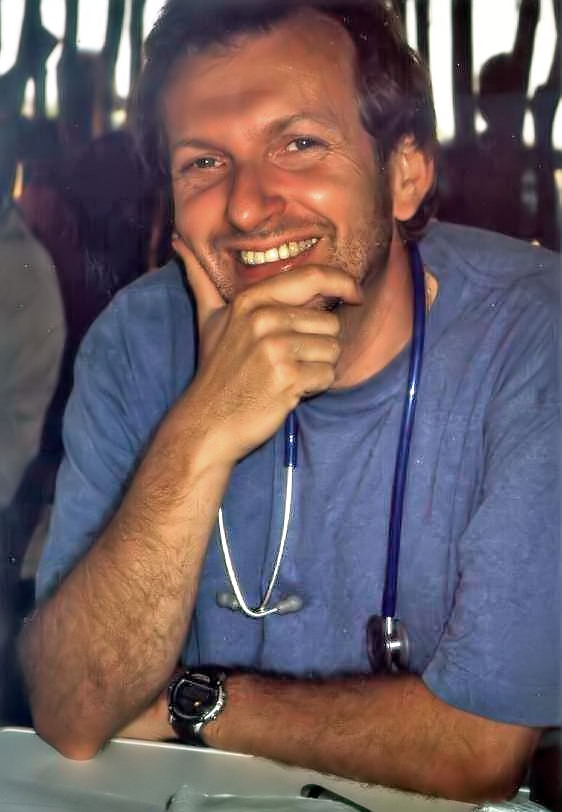
Gerhard Trabert

During his trip through India, Trabert became acquainted with the "outreach health care concept" Medical Streetwork, which primarily treated patients with leprosy. The guiding principle of this concept is: "If the patient does not come to the doctor, the doctor comes to the patient." Inspired by this work and his experiences there, he transferred this medical approach to the health care of homeless people. In 1994, he founded the Mainz Model, a medical care facility for homeless people. With a "mobile doctor", Trabert and his colleagues visit certain locations and offer medical help free of charge. Trabert was the first doctor in Germany to receive statutory health insurance approval for this form of mobile practice.

He is the author of numerous specialist articles on the subject of poverty and health, child poverty, poverty and suicidality, and children of parents with cancer. Trabert is also the author of children's books on the subject of cancer. In 1998 he founded the Poverty and Health in Germany association, and is a member of the National Poverty Conference. He is also the founder and chairman of the Flüsterpost association. From 1999 to 2009 he was a professor of medicine and social medicine at the Georg Simon Ohm University in Nuremberg, and since 2009 he has been a professor of social medicine and social psychiatry in the social work department at the RheinMain University of Applied Sciences. He is also the owner of the G. Trabert publishing house.

In 2013, Trabert set up the “Ambulance without Borders” in the city of Mainz. The organisation employs twenty doctors, nurses and social workers and provides uninsured patients including homeless people with free medical treatment.

== Sport ==
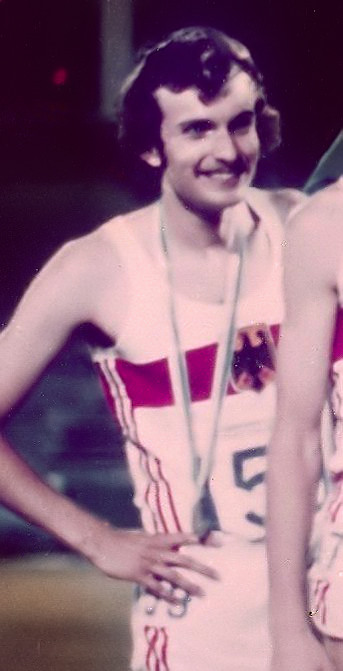
Trabert at the 1975 European Junior Championships

Before and during his studies, Gerhard Trabert was part of the German junior and student national athletics team. His sporting successes include the silver medal in the 4 x 400 metre race at the 1975 European Athletics Junior Championships and the bronze medal in the 4 x 400 metre race at the 1977 FISU World University Games. His best time of 1:49.26 minutes for 800 metres, which Trabert set in 1981, is still included in the list of the "Eternal Top Ten" of the USC Mainz.

== Politics ==
In the 2021 German federal election, Trabert ran as a direct candidate for the Die Linke party for the Mainz constituency but was not on the party's state list in Rhineland-Palatinate. In the election on 26 September, he came in 4th place with 12.7% of the vote and thus missed out on a place in the Bundestag. This made him the best first vote result of a candidate from the Left Party in West Germany in the 2021 election.

In the 2022 German presidential election on 13 February 2022, Die Linke nominated Trabert as its candidate against the incumbent Frank-Walter Steinmeier who was running for another term. Trabert wanted to use this candidacy, in his own words, to draw attention to poverty and social injustice in Germany: "It's not about me. It's about the people I'm committed to," he said. Trabert received 96 of the 1,437 votes cast in the Federal Assembly, 25 more than the number of representatives The Left had.

Re-elected President of Germany Frank-Walter Steinmeier addressed Trabert directly in his speech on 13 February 2022:

"Permit me, dear Professor Trabert, to say one more thing. With your candidacy, you have drawn attention to an issue that deserves more attention: the situation of the poorest and most vulnerable in our country. You deserve not only respect for this, but I hope that your momentum will continue." – Frank-Walter Steinmeier

Steinmeier also suggested a meeting with Trabert in order to "bring more attention to this pressing issue together". This meeting took place on 4 March 2022 at Bellevue Palace. They discussed concrete measures and actions to help poor people.

The promised visit of the Federal President to Mainz took place on 2 June 2022. Steinmeier visited the mobile doctor's unit for the homeless and was very impressed by Trabert's work. Long-term cooperation in combating poverty was discussed.

As part of his candidacy, Trabert pointed out the turning a blind eye to the conditions of refugees and poor people in Germany and drew a parallel to the turning a blind eye to the atrocities committed by the Nazis during the National Socialist era: "Just as many Germans knew back then what was happening to the Jews, today we know what is happening to refugees in the Mediterranean, in Libyan and Syrian camps. We know how poverty is increasing, we know about the increased death rate of poor people here in Germany too."

Trabert also said of the situation in Germany: "The courts are also abusing their power to silence criticism in this democracy. We cannot accept that." Although Trabert was referring to the criminalization of sea rescue workers, his statements were criticized from various sides.

At the end of 2022, Trabert was one of the first signatories of a petition and campaign by DiEM25 to abandon the debt brake of the German balanced budget amendment.

In February 2023, he was the first signatory of the "Manifesto for Peace" petition to Olaf Scholz, initiated by Sahra Wagenknecht and Alice Schwarzer, which called for diplomacy and negotiations and against further "escalating arms deliveries" to Ukraine in the wake of the Russian invasion.

In July 2023, the Die Linke Party Executive proposed Trabert for fourth place on the party's candidate list for the 2024 European elections. Since the party received only three seats with 2.7 percent of the vote, he missed out on a place in the European Parliament.

In the 2025 German federal election Trabert was elected to the Bundestag as the top candidate on the Rhineland-Palatinate state list. Due to health problems however Trabert has so far not participated in parliamentary sessions.

== International missions ==
- Health clinic for Bosnian refugees in Ljubljana, Slovenia
- Health care programme in the slums of Dhaka, Bangladesh
- 2001 after the 11 September attacks in Afghanistan
- 2005 after the Boxing Day Tsunami in Sri Lanka
- 2009 healthcare in the South Pacific, Cook Islands
- 2010 after the earthquake in Haiti
- 2010 Pakistan after the flood disaster
- 2011 East Greenland
- 2012 Prisoner Care in Ethiopia
- 2013 Care for the mentally ill in Indonesia (Bali)
- 2013 Supply of Syrian refugees in Lebanon
- 2014 East Greenland
- 2014 Care for the mentally ill in Indonesia
- 2014 Care for street children in Kisumu, Kenya
- 2015 Sea-Watch – Civil Sea Rescue of Refugees, Lampedusa, Italy
- 2015 Providing care for refugees in Kilis, (Turkey-Syrian border)
- 2016 Sea-Watch – Civil Sea Rescue of Refugees, Malta
- 2016 Providing care to refugees in Idomeni, Greece
- 2016 Providing care to refugees in Kilis, Türkiye (Syrian border)
- 2016 Providing care to refugees in Reyhanli, Türkiye (Syrian border)
- 2016 Support of the Akrabat Hospital in Idlib, Syria
- 2017 Support for health facilities in the Rojava region, Northern Syria (including in Kobani)
- 2017 Work in the Ayn Issa refugee camp in the Raqqa region, Northern Syria
- 2017 Support of the aid organization CADUS – Collaboration in TSP (Trauma Stabilisation Point) in Mosul, Iraq
- 2017 Care for refugees on the island of Lesbos, Greece
- 2018 Providing aid to refugees in Kobani, Raqqa and Manbij, Northern Syria
- 2019 humanitarian, medical mission in an orphanage in Benin, West Africa
- 2019 Care of patients with diabetes mellitus in Kobani, Northern Syria
- 2019 ResQship – Civil Sea Rescue of Refugees in the Mediterranean
- 2019 Care for street children in Kisumu, Kenya
- 2020 Providing care to refugees in Kara Tepe Refugee Camp and Camp Moria on Lesbos, Greece
- 2021 Providing care for refugees in Bihac, Bosnia-Herzegovina
- 2021 Providing care to refugees in Kara Tepe Refugee Camp on Lesbos, Greece (in June and October 2021)
- 2021 Relief operation during the flood disaster in the Ahr Valley
- 2021 ResQship – Civil Sea Rescue of Refugees in the Mediterranean

== Honours and awards ==
Trabert has received numerous awards, including the Order of Merit of the Federal Republic of Germany, the Order of Merit of Rhineland-Palatinate and the Paracelsus Medal. In 2019, Trabert was the first university of applied sciences teacher to receive the "University Teacher of the Year" award, worth 10,000 euros; the ceremony was scheduled to take place on 6 April 2020, as part of the "Gala of German Science" in Berlin, but was cancelled due to the coronavirus.

=== Sports ===
- 1975: Silver medal 4 × 400 m, European Athletics Junior Championships Athens
- 1977: Bronze medal 4 × 400 m, Universiade, World Student Championship Sofia
- 2004: Order of Merit of the Federal Republic of Germany (Cross of Merit on Ribbon)
- Günter Gloser Prize
- 2009: Child Protection Award of Der Kinderschutzbund, Rhineland-Palatinate State Association
- 2014: Paracelsus Medal (highest award of the German Medical Association)
- 2015: Order of Merit of Rhineland-Palatinate (highest award of the State of Rhineland-Palatinate)
- 2015: 1st Civil Society Prize to the Association Poverty and Health, European Economic and Social Committee
- 2016: Volunteering Award for Social Work, Lotto Foundation
- 2018: Carola Gold Prize, Berlin
- 2019: Salomon Neumann Medal of the German Society for Social Medicine and Prevention
- 2020: University Teacher of the Year
- 2021: Mainz Media Prize
