= Partei Mensch Klima Tierschutz =

Political party in Germany

Partei Mensch Klima Tierschutz Tierschutzpartei
- Chairpersons: Paula López Vicente, Bernd Kriebel, Dennis Landgraf
- Founded: 13 February 1993
- Headquarters: Schreiersgrüner Str. 5; 08233 Treuen
- Membership (2024): 2,400
- Ideology: Animal rights Animal welfare Environmentalism; Veganism
- Political position: Left-wing
- European Parliament group: The Left in the European Parliament
- European political alliance: Animal Politics EU
- Colours: Teal
- Bundestag: 0 / 630
- State Parliaments: 0 / 1,855
- European Parliament: 1 / 96

Website
- tierschutzpartei.de

The Partei Mensch Klima Tierschutz (English: Party Human Climate Animal-Protection, short form: German: Tierschutzpartei) is a political party in Germany, founded in 1993. In 2014, the party elected one MEP to the European Parliament, and it has remained at one MEP since. Between 2020 and 2024, the party was briefly unrepresented in the European Parliament due to the resignation of Martin Buschmann. The party has never had any members in any of the German state parliaments, nor has it ever had any members of the Bundestag. In 2026 the name was changed from Partei Mensch Umwelt Tierschutz to Partei Mensch Klima Tierschutz as a step towards the fusion with the Klimaliste (Climate List Party).

== History ==
The Animal Protection Party first contested the 1993 Hamburg state election and received 0.3% of the vote. The party contested the 1994 federal election where it received 0.15% of the national vote (71,643 votes in total). It performed best in Bavaria, where it received 0.4% of the vote.

In the 1995 North Rhine-Westphalia state election, the party received 0.1% of the vote. In the 1996 Baden-Württemberg state election, the party received 0.3% of the vote. In 1997, the party elected its first ever official, with Jürgen Gerlach defeating a CDU candidate in the Aschbach local council elections.

In the 1998 federal election, the party received 0.27% of the national vote (133,832 votes in total), almost doubling its votes. It did best in Brandenburg, where it received 0.9% of the vote.

The Animal Protection Party participated in its first European parliament elections in 1999, where it received 0.7% of the national vote.

In the 2002 federal election, the party received 0.33% of the national vote (159,655 votes in total).

In the 2004 European parliament elections, the Animal Protection Party received by far its best federal result yet, receiving 1.3% of the national vote and coming 8th in the elections.

In the 2005 federal election, the Animal Protection Party received 0.2% of the national vote (110,603 votes in total), showing its trend of consistently overperforming in European parliament elections and underperforming in federal elections.

In the 2009 European parliament elections, the Animal Protection Party received 1.1% of the national vote (289,694 votes in total). The party continued to receive 0 seats.

In the 2009 federal election, the Animal Protection Party received 0.5% of the national vote (230,872 votes in total).

In the 2013 federal election, the Animal Protection Party received 0.3% of the national vote (140,366 votes in total).

In the 2014 European parliament elections, the Animal Protection Party received 1.25% of the national vote (366,303 votes in total) and returned one MEP, Stefan Eck, who sat with the GUE-NGL. In December 2014 Eck left the party and became an independent MEP in the GUE-NGL group.

In the 2017 federal election, the Animal Protection Party received 0.8% of the national vote (374,179 votes in total).

In the 2019 European parliament elections, the Animal Protection Party received 1.45% of the national vote (541,984 votes in total) and returned one MEP, Martin Buschmann. Buschmann resigned from the party in February 2020 after it was revealed that from 1992 to 1996 he was a member of and a chairman in the far-right National Democratic Party of Germany (NPD).

In the 2021 federal election, the Animal Protection Party received 1.5% of the national vote (675,353 votes in total), which is the best result in a federal election since the party has been founded.

The party took an anti-war position towards the 2022 Russian invasion of Ukraine, arguing that neither NATO or EU should "develop into a military global player", and condemning the militaristic and anti-Russian rhetoric. The party condemns the Russian invasion, but states that the European Union also bears responsibility for it. It supports a complete ban on arms exports to areas outside the EU, and argues that the EU should be forbidden from direct or indirect participation in foreign military actions, listing the wars in Middle East, Turkish conflict with Syrian and Iraqi Kurdish areas, as well as "the heated up conflict in Kosovo and also to the war in Ukraine" as examples. The Animal Protection Party also calls for dialogue with Russia and China, and believes that the Russian invasion should not lead to breakdown of diplomatic relations.

Sebastian Everding was elected for the party in the 2024 European Parliament election in Germany.

The party holds 37 seats in municipality and county assemblies and one seat in the Bezirkstag Oberbayern.

In 2024, a cooperation with the Klimaliste party was started, which resulted in plans for a fusion of both parties. As one step towards that, the party changed their long name from "Partei Mensch Umwelt Tierschutz" to "Partei Mensch Klima Tierschutz" in February 2026. The fusion is planned to be finalized in summer 2026.

== Ideology, platform and policy ==
The Animal Protection Party is considered a left-wing political party, as part of the Animal Politics EU alliance. It is a member of The Left in the European Parliament, the furthest left group in the European Parliament. Its platform can be considered as left-liberal, environmentalist and pacifist.

The party aspires to turn away from the anthropocentric view of life. The party calls for an independent animal protection officer for each federal state. Its main goal is the introduction of more animal rights into the German constitution. Those include the right to live and the protection from physical and psychological damages. Thus, the Animal Protection Party demands prohibition of animal testing, bullfighting, hunting, the production of furs, circus animals and agricultural animal husbandry. Furthermore, the party supports the adaptation of Germans to veganism.

The Animal Protection Party wants a reduction of car traffic and an immediate exit from nuclear energy. The party calls for the "consistent use of renewable energies" and the phase-out of coal-fired power generation by 2030. Furthermore, the party also supports an EU-wide switch to 100% renewable energies by 2035. To strengthen climate protection, the party supports a ban on disposable electronic cigarettes, more consistent avoidance of plastic waste, including through fixed quotas for recyclable plastics.

Economically, the Animal Protection Party supports more social justice, a stamp duty and a free basic income. The Animal Protection Party supports equal rights for the LGBTQ community, and supports a euthanasia system similar to the Netherlands. On foreign policy, the party opposes a European army and backs a pacifism clause in the EU treaty.

== Chairs ==
- Paula López Vicente, Marcel Krohn, Robert Gabel (2023)
- Paula López Vicente, Bernd Kriebel, Dennis Landgraf (2024)

== Election results ==
=== Federal parliament (Bundestag) ===
Election	Constituency		Party list		Seats	+/–	Status
Election	Votes	%	Votes	%	Seats	+/–	Status
1994			71,643	0.2 (#11)	0 / 672		Extra-parliamentary
1998	1,734	0.0 (#30)	133,832	0.3 (#11)	0 / 669	0	Extra-parliamentary
2002	8,858	0.0 (#15)	159,655	0.3 (#10)	0 / 603	0	Extra-parliamentary
2005	7,341	0.0 (#15)	110,603	0.2 (#11)	0 / 614	0	Extra-parliamentary
2009	16,887	0.0 (#16)	230,872	0.5 (#9)	0 / 622	0	Extra-parliamentary
2013	4,437	0.0 (#20)	140,366	0.3 (#11)	0 / 630	0	Extra-parliamentary
2017	22,917	0.1 (#15)	374,179	0.8 (#10)	0 / 709	0	Extra-parliamentary
2021	160,863	0.4 (#11)	673,669	1.5 (#9)	0 / 736	0	Extra-parliamentary
2025	82,485	0.17 (#12)	482,032	0.97 (#10)	0 / 630	0	Extra-parliamentary

=== European Parliament ===
Election	Votes	%	Seats	+/–	EP Group
1999	185,186	0.68 (#8)	0 / 99	New	–
2004	331,388	1.29 (#8)	0 / 99	0	–
2009	289,694	1.10 (#9)	0 / 99	0	–
2014	366,598	1.25 (#10)	1 / 96	▲1	GUE/NGL
2019	542,226	1.45 (#10)	1 / 96	0	The Left
2024	570,498	1.43 (#12)	1 / 96	0	The Left

== See also ==
- European Vegetarian Union
- List of animal advocacy parties
- Gisela Bulla
