= Sebastian van Ryt =

German politician (born 1986)

Member of the Landtag of Baden-Württemberg
- Incumbent
- Assumed office 11 May 2026

Personal details
- Born: 1986 (age 39–40)
- Party: Alternative for Germany

Sebastian Zacharias van Ryt (born 1986) is a German politician who was elected member of the Landtag of Baden-Württemberg in 2026. He is a municipal councillor of Villingen-Schwenningen and a district councillor of the Schwarzwald-Baar-Kreis.
