= Sandro Scheer =

German politician (born 1978)

Member of the Landtag of Baden-Württemberg
- Incumbent
- Assumed office 1 April 2025
- Preceded by: Hans-Jürgen Goßner
- Constituency: Göppingen

Personal details
- Born: 22 July 1978 (age 48)
- Party: Alternative for Germany

Sandro Scheer (born 22 July 1978) is a German politician serving as a member of the Landtag of Baden-Württemberg since 2025.

In the 2021 Baden-Württemberg state election, Scheer was the proxy candidate for Hans-Jürgen Goßner who got elected in the state parliament constituency of Göppingen (district). When Goßner was elected in 2025 to the 21st Bundestag, Scheer on 1 April 2025 became his successor in the state parliament. For the upcoming 2026 Baden-Württemberg state election, in which state lists are introduced, Scheer was elected to a position deemed "safe" to remain member of Landtag, MdL.

Scheer has served as chairman of the Alternative for Germany chapter in Göppingen (district) since 2020, having previously served in 2016.
