= Oliver Ruhnert =

German association football manager

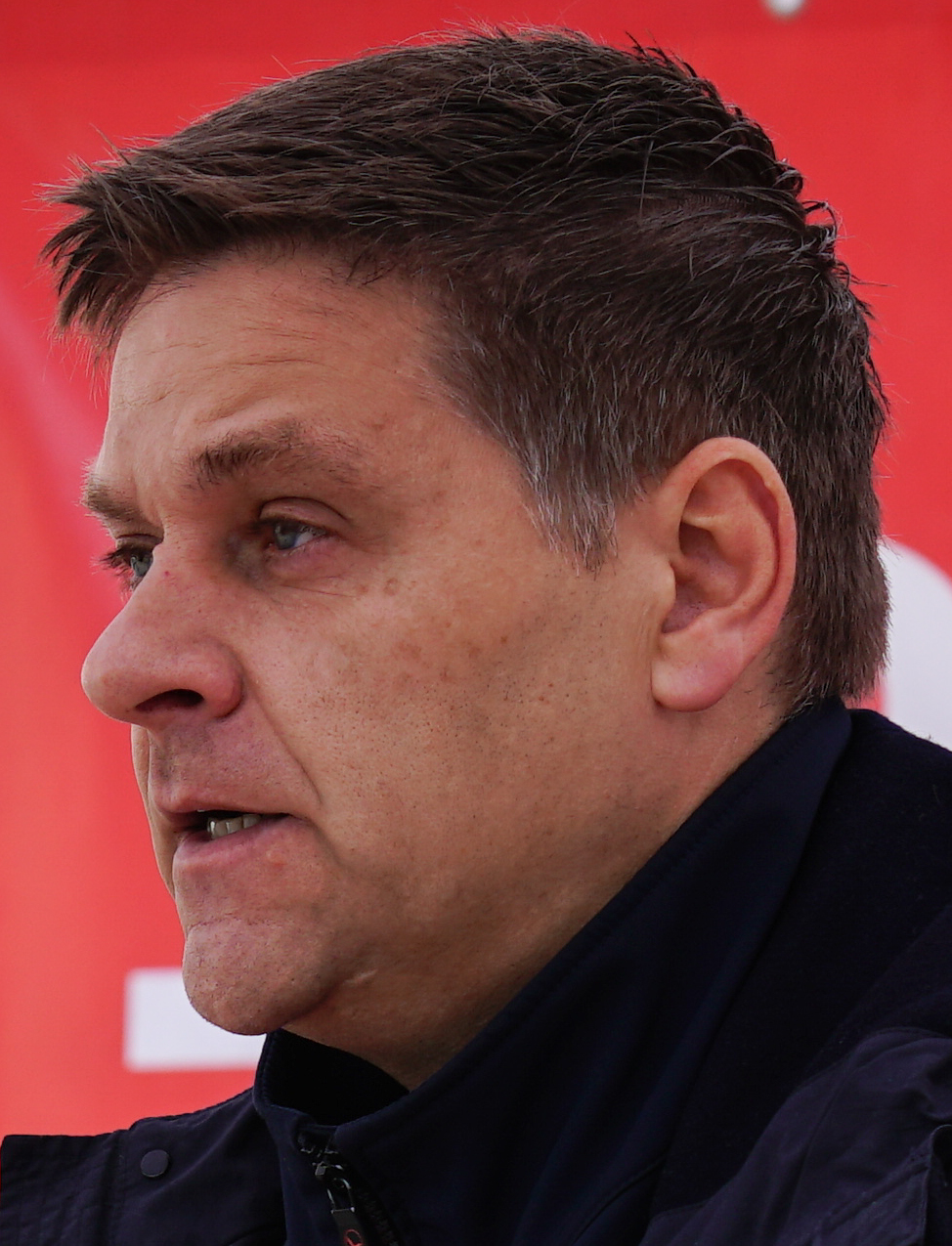
- Ruhnert in 2019

Personal details
- Born: 18 November 1971 (age 54) Arnsberg, West Germany
- Party: BSW (2024–present)
- Other political affiliations: SPD (until 2005); The Left (2007–2024)
- Occupation: Football coach • Referee • Politician

Oliver Ruhnert (born 18 November 1971) is a German football referee, as well as former football coach and sporting director. He is also a politician affiliated with the Sahra Wagenknecht Alliance (BSW).

== Life ==
=== Politics ===
Oliver Ruhnert was initially active in the Social Democratic Party of Germany (SPD) and left the party after the 2005 federal election. From 2007, Ruhnert worked as a local politician for the Left Party. Ruhnert was the parliamentary group leader of his party in the Iserlohn city council and a member of various city committees. He stood for election as mayor of Iserlohn in 2009. At the end of May 2024, he switched to the Sahra Wagenknecht Alliance (BSW) and was nominated in November 2024 by the Berlin state board of the BSW to number 1 on the state list for the 2025 German federal election. The BSW received less than the five percent hurdle and did not enter the Bundestag.

=== Sports ===
In the 2001/02 season he was coach of FC Gütersloh in the Oberliga Westfalen. Since then he has worked as a coach for SF Oestrich-Iserlohn and FC Iserlohn until 2017 and was also employed as a scout at FC Schalke 04 for the 2007/08 season. After Markus Högner was sacked in May 2009, he took over training of Schalke's second team together with Sven Kmetsch. In January 2010 Ruhnert was replaced by Michael Boris and then worked as a scout again. From 1 June 2011 to 31 July 2017 he was head of the youth department at Schalke. From 2014 onwards he was director of the Knappenschmiede and promoted the development of Bernard Tekpetey, among others. From August 2017 he was chief scout at 1. FC Union Berlin and since 15 May 2018 he has been managing director of professional football and head of the licensed player department at Union. In this position he signed Urs Fischer, among others. After the end of the 2023/24 season he returned to his old position as chief scout at his own request. His successor as managing director of professional football was Horst Heldt.

Ruhnert holds a B-license as a trainer. He is also active as a referee in the district league.

== Works ==
- Wer nicht mit der Zeit geht, der geht mit der Zeit. In: Gib alles ─ nur nie auf!: Die Erfolgsstrategien vom Trainer der Weltstars von Norbert Elgert, Ariston, 2019.
- Das Geheimnis seines Erfolgs. Vom Sauerland über Schalke zu Union. Verlag Neues Leben, Berlin, 2022, ISBN 978-3-355-01907-1
