= Mario Mieruch =

German politician (born 1975)

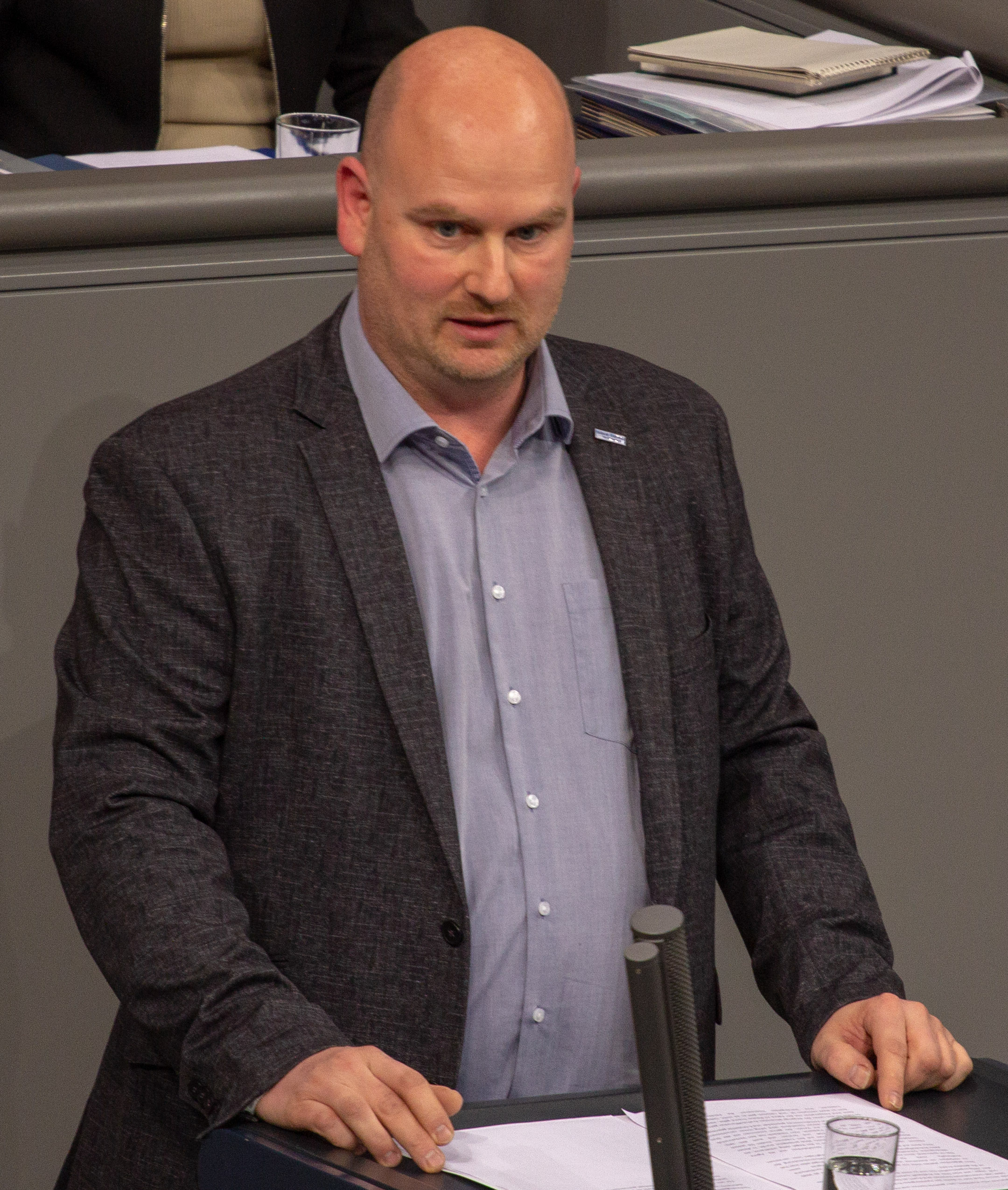
- Mieruch in 2019

Member of the Bundestag
- Incumbent
- Assumed office 24 October 2017

Personal details
- Born: 16 August 1975 (age 51)

Mario Mieruch (born 16 August 1975) is a German politician, elected to the Bundestag in September 2017 as a member of Alternative for Germany. He left the party's parliamentary bloc the following month.

== Life ==
Mieruch was born in Magdeburg. After compulsory military service, he completed a degree in mechatronics and has worked in industrial automation since 2000.

== Political career ==
Mieruch was part of Wahlalternative 2013 and then became a founding member of Alternative for Germany. He was elected to the Bundestag on the party list in the September 2017 election. The following month, he followed the party leader Frauke Petry in leaving its parliamentary bloc to become an independent on grounds that it was failing to distance itself from right-wing extremist elements, in particular Björn Höcke.

== Personal life ==
He lived in Metelen at the time when he left the AfD in 2017.
