= Hans-Jürgen Goßner =

German politician (born 1970)

Member of the Bundestag
- Incumbent
- Assumed office 25 March 2025

Member of the Landtag of Baden-Württemberg
- In office 11 May 2021 – 31 March 2025

Personal details
- Born: 17 November 1970 (age 55)
- Party: Alternative for Germany (AfD)

Hans-Jürgen Goßner (born 17 November 1970) is a German Alternative for Germany (AfD) politician who had served as a member of the Landtag of Baden-Württemberg since the 2021 Baden-Württemberg state election.

In the 2025 federal election, he was elected via AfD state list as a member of the 21st Bundestag.

Sandro Scheer, his 2021 proxy candidate in the state parliament constituency of Göppingen (district), on 1 April 2025 became his successor in the state parliament.
