= Memmingen – Unterallgäu =

Federal electoral district of Germany

255 Memmingen – Unterallgäu
- Electoral district for the Bundestag
- Memmingen – Unterallgäu in 2025
- State: Bavaria
- Major settlements: Memmingen; Bad Wörishofen; Mindelheim
- Area: 1,459.4 km^{2}

Current electoral district
- Created: 2025
- Member: Florian Dorn
- Elected: 2025

Memmingen – Unterallgäu is an electoral constituency (German: Wahlkreis) represented in the Bundestag. It elects one member via first-past-the-post voting. Under the current constituency numbering system, it is designated as constituency 255. It is located in southwestern Bavaria, comprising the city of Memmingen, the Unterallgäu district, and parts of the Landkreis Augsburg district.

Memmingen – Unterallgäu was created for the 2025 federal election. Since 2025, the seat has been held by Florian Dorn of the CSU.

== Geography ==
Memmingen – Unterallgäu is located in southwestern Bavaria. As of the 2025 federal election, it comprises the independent city of Memmingen, the district of Unterallgäu, as well as the municipalities of Fischach and Schwabmünchen and the collective municipality of Stauden from the Landkreis Augsburg district.

== History ==
Memmingen – Unterallgäu was created in 2025 due to the redistribution of a constituency from Saxony-Anhalt to Bavaria. It comprises parts of the constituencies of Augsburg-Land, Neu-Ulm, and Ostallgaü.

== Members ==
The constituency has been held continuously by the Christian Social Union (CSU) since its creation. Florian Johannes Dorn was first elected in 2025.

Election	Member	Party	%
2025	Florian Dorn	CSU	43.8

== Election results ==
=== 2025 election ===
Federal election (2025): Memmingen – Unterallgäu
Notes:	Blue background denotes the winner of the electorate vote. Pink background denotes a candidate elected from their party list. Yellow background denotes an electorate win by a list member, or other incumbent. A ✓ or ✗ denotes status of any incumbent, win or lose respectively.						
Party	Candidate	Votes	%	±%	Party votes	%	±%
CSU	Florian Dorn	58,477	43.8	▲6.2	52,441	39.1	▲7.1
AfD	Dr. Simon Kuchlbauer	30,372	22.7	▲10.9	31,392	23.4	▲11.8
SPD	Marcel Keller	12,674	9.5	▼3.3	12,136	9.0	▼5.8
FW	Michael Kroeschell	11,107	8.3	▼1.6	7,307	5.4	▼4.2
Greens	Joachim Linse	10,821	8.1	▼3.0	11,191	8.3	▼2.2
Left	Jennifer Merx	6,213	4.7	▲2.5	5,944	4.4	▲2.2
BSW					4,063	3.0	
FDP	Daniel Steffen	3,937	2.9	▼5.0	5,528	4.1	▼7.1
APT					1,006	0.8	▼0.4
ÖDP					840	0.6	▼0.5
dieBasis					723	0.5	▼2.2
PARTEI					548	0.4	▼0.2
Volt					537	0.4	▲0.2
BP					235	0.2	▼0.3
BD					126	0.1	
Humanists					90	0.1	Steady
MLPD					23	0.0	Steady
Informal votes		948			419		
Total valid votes		133,061			134,130		
Turnout		134,549	84.4	▲5.0			
CSU win new seat	Majority	18,105	21.1				
