= Jan Nolte =

German politician (born 1988)

Member of the Bundestag
- Incumbent
- Assumed office 2017

Personal details
- Born: 30 December 1988 (age 37) Bremen, West Germany
- Party: AfD

Jan Nolte (born 30 December 1988) is a German politician. Born in Bremen, he represents Alternative for Germany (AfD). Jan Nolte has served as a member of the Bundestag from the state of Hesse since 2017.

== Life ==
He became member of the Bundestag after the 2017 German federal election. He is a member of the defense committee.

Nolte has regularly given interviews to Russian newspaper Izvestia.
