= Doris Achelwilm =

German politician and journalist

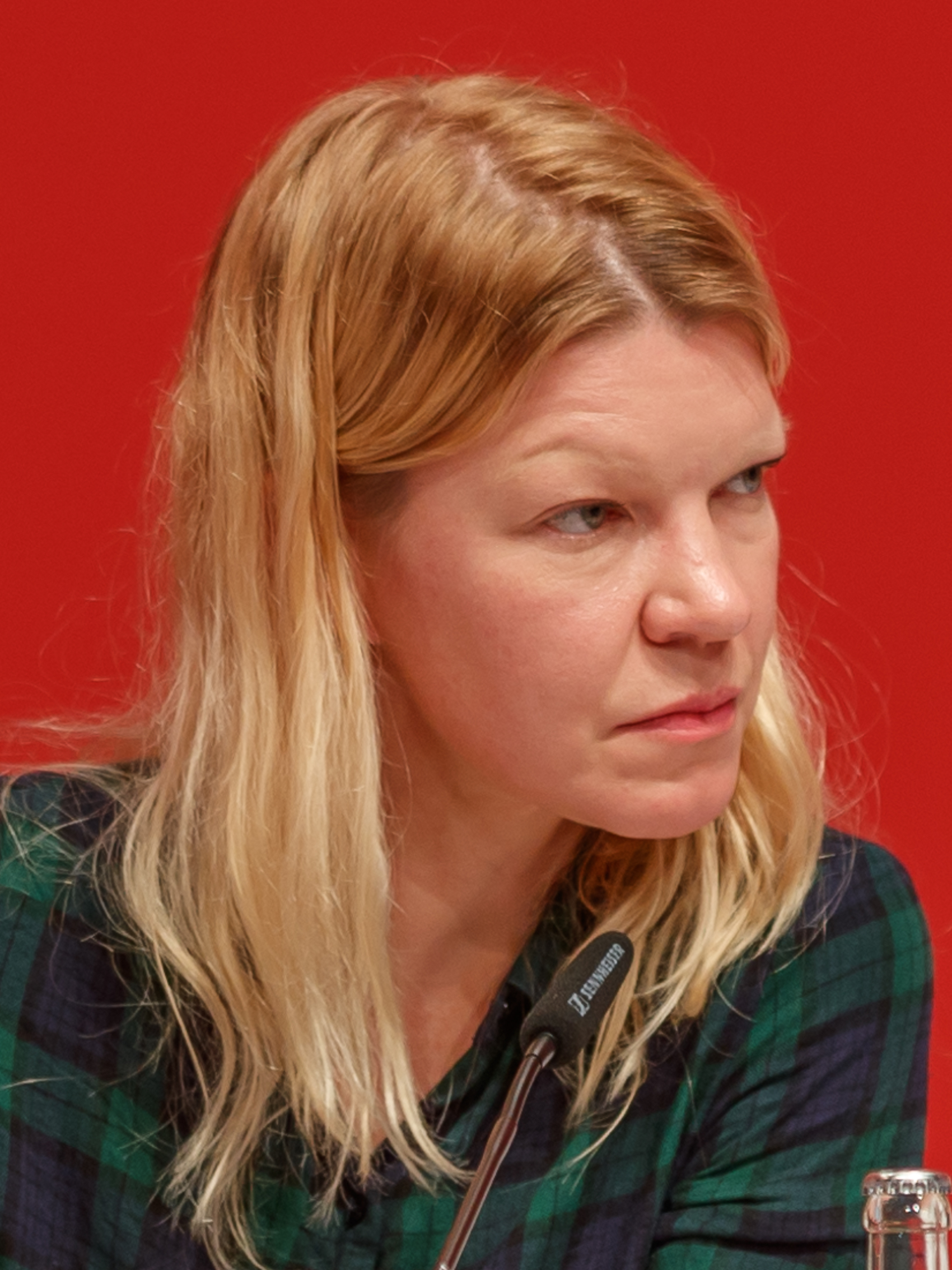
- Achelwilm in 2022

Member of the Bundestag for Bremen I
- Incumbent
- Assumed office 25 March 2025
- In office 24 October 2017 – 26 October 2021

Personal details
- Born: Doris Maria Achelwilm; 30 November 1976 (age 49) Thuine, West Germany
- Party: The Left (since 2007)
- Education: Leibniz University Hannover
- Occupation: Journalist; Politician

Doris Maria Achelwilm (born 30 November 1976) is a German journalist and politician of The Left party. Between 2017 and 2021 she was a member of the Bundestag. In 2025 she was reelected to her seat in Bremen.

== Biography ==
She was born in Thuine, Lower Saxony.

She was first elected a member of the Bundestag in the 2017 federal election where she represents the German state of Bremen as a member of The Left Party. She served as part of the Committee on Cultural and Media Affairs in the Bundestag. She lost her seat at the 2021 federal election. In the 2025 federal election she was reelected to her office in the Bundestag.
