= Florian Dorn =

German politician (born 1986)

Florian Dorn MdB

Member of the Bundestag; for Memmingen – Unterallgäu
- Incumbent
- Assumed office 25 March 2025
- Preceded by: Constituency established

Personal details
- Born: 24 May 1986 (age 40) Memmingen, West Germany
- Party: Christian Social Union
- Education: LMU Munich; University of Mannheim; University of California, Berkeley

Florian Johannes Dorn (born 24 May 1986) is a German economist and politician of the Christian Social Union (CSU) who has been serving as a member of the Bundestag since 2025, representing the Memmingen – Unterallgäu district.

== Early career ==
Prior to entering parliament, Dorn worked at the Ifo Institute for Economic Research for nine years, including as advisor to the institute's president Clemens Fuest from 2020 to 2025. In 2019, he was a visiting fellow at the London School of Economics.

== Political career ==
In parliament, Dorn has been serving on the Finance Committee and the Defence Committee since 2025.

In 2025, the government of Chancellor Friedrich Merz appointed Dorn to serve on an expert commission tasked with developing recommendations for a comprehensive reorganization of Germany’s pension system, co-chaired by Constanze Janda and Frank-Jürgen Weise.
