= Richard Pitterle =

German politician

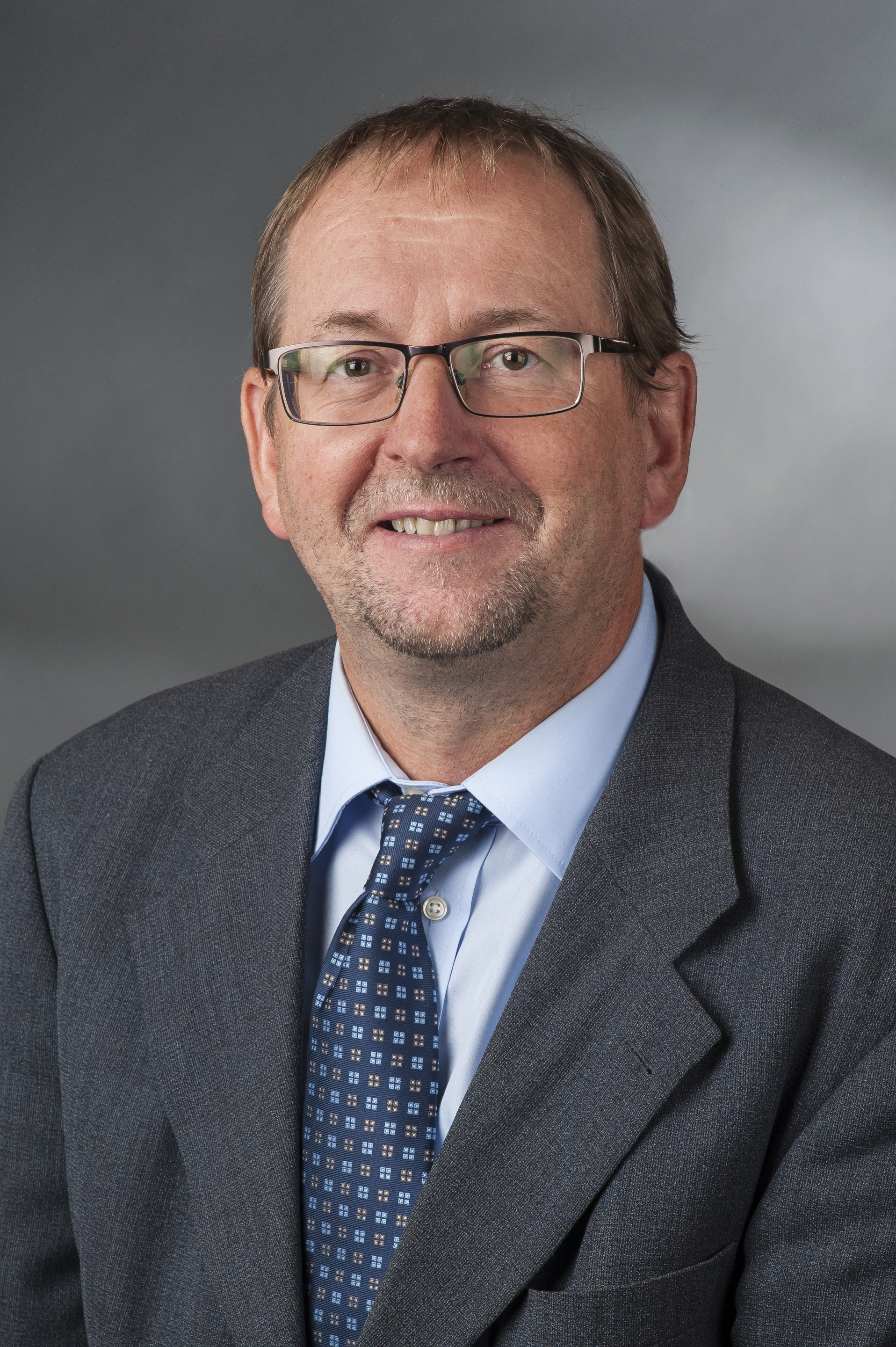
Pitterle in 2014

Richard Pitterle (born 2 March 1959) is a German lawyer and politician of the Sahra Wagenknecht Alliance, who was previously a member of the Left Party. From 2009 to 2017, he served as a member of the Bundestag.

== Early life and education ==
Richard Pitterle was born on 2 March 1959 in Most in Czechoslovakia and came to Sindelfingen, Germany in 1970. After his 1980 Abitur, he studied the law in Tübingen from 1980 to 1986. He started working as a lawyer in Stuttgart in 1990, specialising in labour law in 2003.

== Political work ==
Pitterle has been politically active since age 15 when he joined the Association of Persecutees of the Nazi Regime – Federation of Antifascists (VVN). In the Böblingen district, he was involved in the founding and activities of the peace movement and he was Chairman of the VVN until 1990. In December 1990, he joined the Party of Democratic Socialism and was its state treasurer in Baden-Württemberg from 1991 to 1998. He was a co-founder of the party-affiliated Rosa Luxemburg Foundation in Baden-Württemberg in 1999 and its treasurer until 2006. From 2007 to 2014, Pitterle was the district chairman of the Left Party in the Böblingen district. He was elected to the Sindelfingen municipal council in the 2009 and 2014 local elections.

In the German Federal Elections of 2009 and 2013, Pitterle was elected into the Bundestag through his party's state list.

After the CumEx-Scandal, Pitterle announced his run in the 2025 German Federal Election, saying that "[it] is time to stop financial crime once and for all and restore tax justice in this country." Pitterle ran for the BSW Baden-Württemberg, but the BSW received less than 5% of the vote and failed to enter the Bundestag.

== Private life ==
Pitterle is married and has two children.

== Publications ==
- May 2009: "Forderungen lösen in Deutschland", Linde (Prague)
