= Sahra Mirow =

German politician (born 1984)

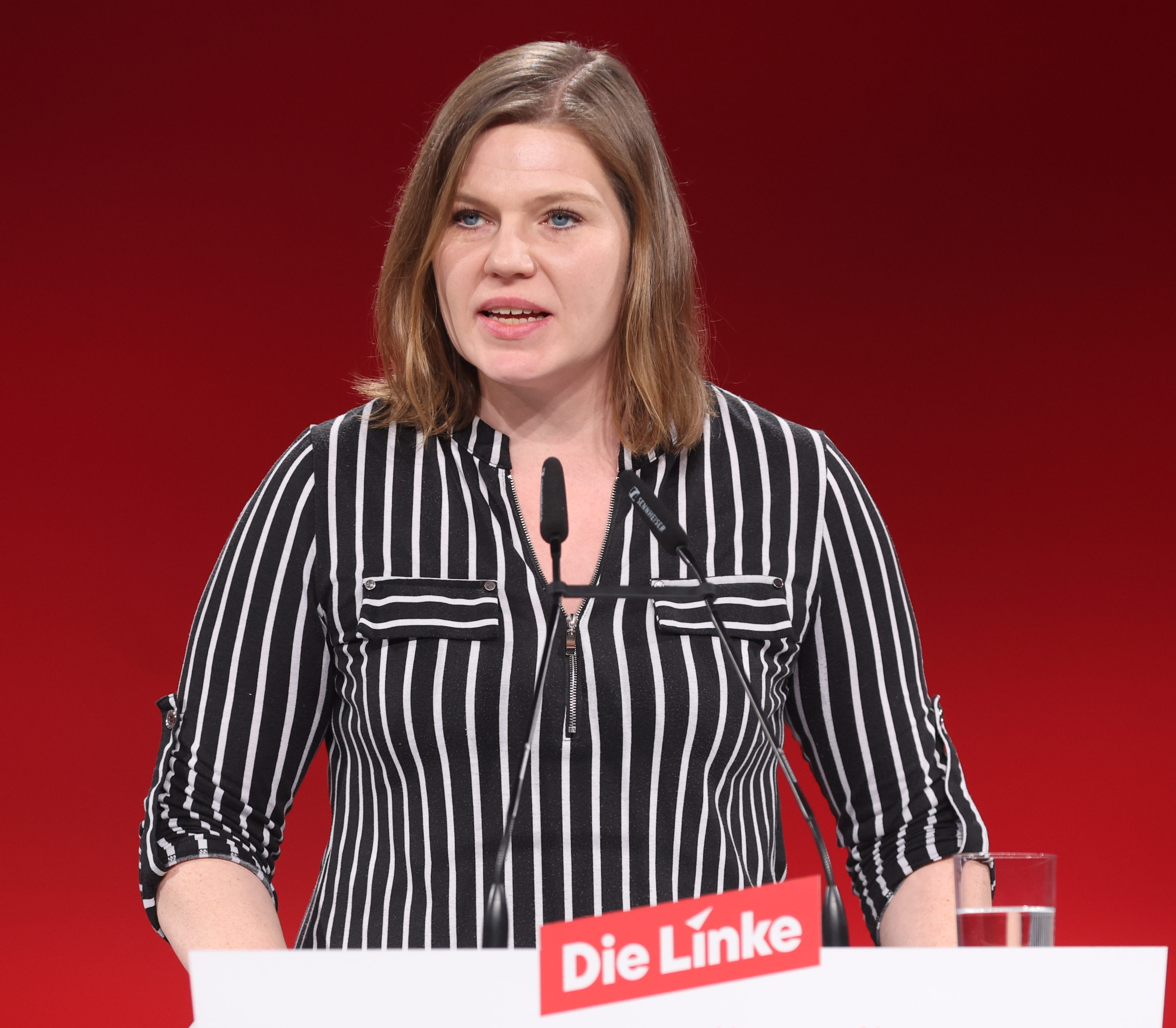
- Mirow in 2025

Member of the Bundestag
- Incumbent
- Assumed office March 2025
- Constituency: Baden-Württemberg

Personal details
- Born: 10 January 1984 (age 42) Lübeck
- Party: The Left (since 2009)

Sahra Mirow (born 10 January 1984 in Lübeck) is a German politician who was elected as a member of the Bundestag in 2025. She has served as co-spokesperson of The Left in Baden-Württemberg since 2018.
