= Pierre Lamely =

German politician (born 1981)

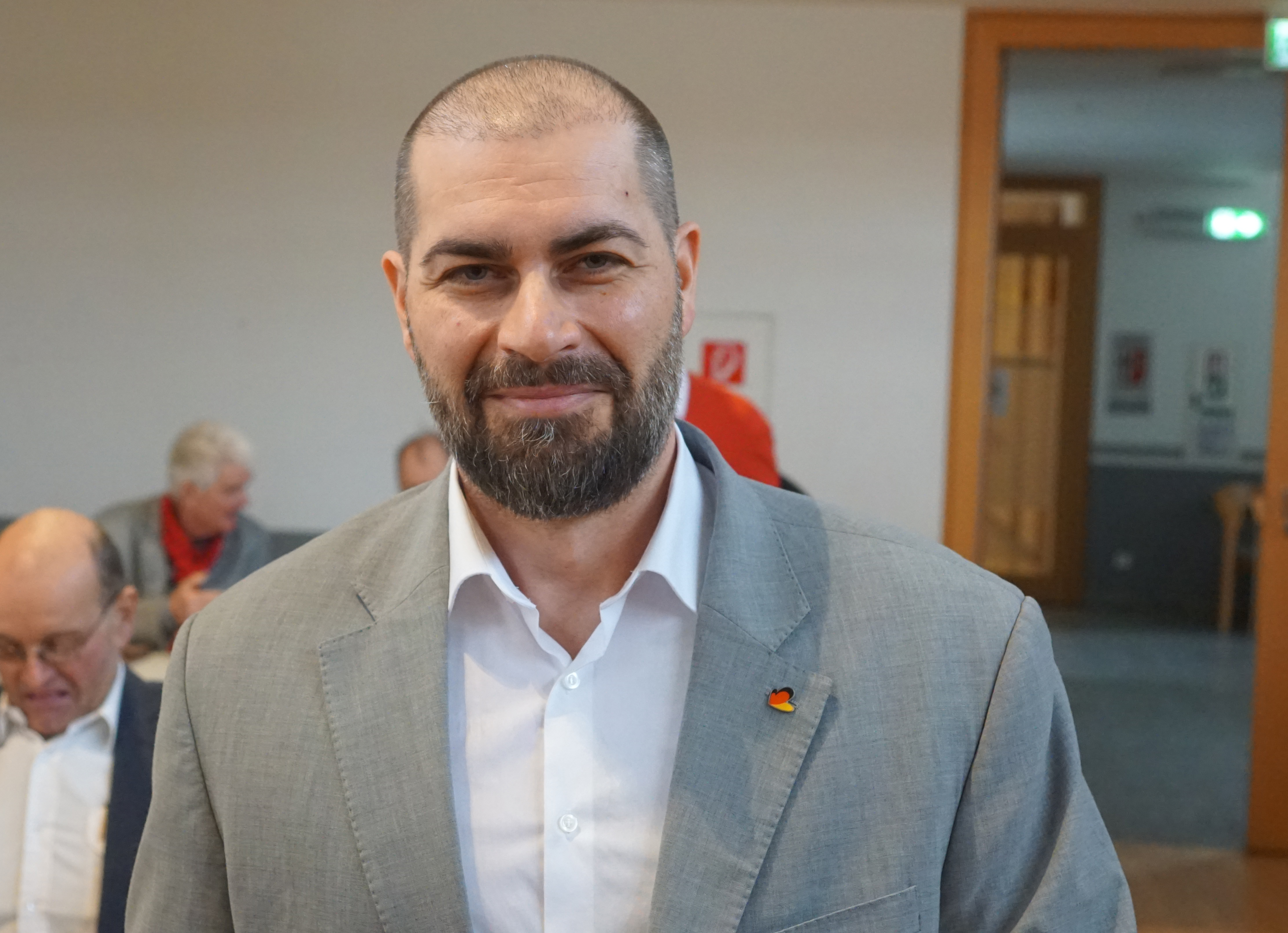

Member of the Bundestag
- Incumbent
- Assumed office March 2025
- Constituency: Hesse

Personal details
- Born: 12 January 1981 (age 45)
- Party: Alternative for Germany

Pierre Lamely (born 12 January 1981) is a German politician who was elected as a member of the Bundestag in 2025. He has served as chairman of the Alternative for Germany in the district council of Fulda since 2023.
