= List of Bundestag constituencies =

Districts for Germany's lower house

Under Germany's personalised and localised proportional system of election, the Bundestag has 299 constituencies (Wahlkreise (German: [ˈvaːlˌkʁaɪ̯zə]), electoral districts), which are used to elect members of the Bundestag. (Note: Candidates receiving the plurality of the vote are only elected in the constituency if the candidate's party is proportionally entitled to that seat.)

Before the electoral reform in 2023, each constituency directly elected one MP, with the remaining seats being elected from the various party closed lists in each of Germany's sixteen states, distributed in a manner that ensures that the overall proportion of representatives for each party above the threshold was in proportion to the share of votes its lists received nationwide.

Since the 2023 reform, constituency seats have been allocated to the candidate with the most votes only if the party is proportionally entitled to the seat in that state. If a party has more constituency pluralities than it is proportionally entitled to seats in a state, only the best performing constituency winners, ranked by relative vote share, are elected. At the 2025 election, 23 constituencies had no candidate elected immediately from them, although other runner-ups from most of these constituencies were elected through their party's state list.

The 2025 German federal election on 23 February 2025 determined the members of the 21st Bundestag.

Constituencies of the 2025 German federal election

== List of seats by Land ==
=== Baden-Württemberg (38 constituencies) ===
No	Constituency	Member	2025	Voters	2021	2017	2013	2009	2005	2002	1998	1994	1990
258	Stuttgart I	Simone Fischer	Grüne	191,811	Grüne	CDU	CDU	CDU	CDU	SPD	CDU	CDU	CDU
259	Stuttgart II	None (Note: No constituency seat allocated due to lack of second vote coverage.)		178,958	CDU	CDU	CDU	CDU	SPD	SPD	SPD	CDU	CDU
260	Böblingen	Marc Biadacz	CDU	245,553	CDU	CDU	CDU	CDU	CDU	CDU	CDU	CDU	CDU
261	Esslingen	David Preisendanz	CDU	166,628	CDU	CDU	CDU	CDU	CDU	CDU	SPD	CDU	CDU
262	Nürtingen	Matthias Hiller	CDU	205,967	CDU	CDU	CDU	CDU	CDU	CDU	CDU	CDU	CDU
263	Göppingen	Hermann Färber	CDU	177,107	CDU	CDU	CDU	CDU	CDU	CDU	CDU	CDU	CDU
264	Waiblingen	Christina Stumpp	CDU	221,775	CDU	CDU	CDU	CDU	CDU	CDU	CDU	CDU	CDU
265	Ludwigsburg	Steffen Bilger	CDU	215,312	CDU	CDU	CDU	CDU	CDU	CDU	CDU	CDU	CDU
266	Neckar-Zaber	Fabian Gramling	CDU	230,738	CDU	CDU	CDU	CDU	CDU	CDU	SPD	CDU	CDU
267	Heilbronn	Alexander Throm	CDU	240,951	CDU	CDU	CDU	CDU	CDU	CDU	CDU	CDU	CDU
268	Schwäbisch Hall – Hohenlohe	Christian von Stetten	CDU	225,874	CDU	CDU	CDU	CDU	CDU	CDU	CDU	CDU	CDU
269	Backnang – Schwäbisch Gmünd	Ingeborg Gräßle	CDU	177,062	CDU	CDU	CDU	CDU	CDU	CDU	CDU	CDU	CDU
270	Aalen - Heidenheim	Roderich Kiesewetter	CDU	220,686	CDU	CDU	CDU	CDU	CDU	CDU	CDU	CDU	CDU
271	Karlsruhe-Stadt	Zoe Mayer	Grüne	205,608	Grüne	CDU	CDU	CDU	CDU	SPD	SPD	CDU	CDU
272	Karlsruhe-Land	Nicolas Zippelius	CDU	209,147	CDU	CDU	CDU	CDU	CDU	CDU	CDU	CDU	CDU
273	Rastatt	Kai Whittaker	CDU	204,890	CDU	CDU	CDU	CDU	CDU	CDU	CDU	CDU	CDU
274	Heidelberg	None		218,431	Grüne	CDU	CDU	CDU	CDU	SPD	SPD	CDU	CDU
275	Mannheim	None		196,863	SPD	CDU	CDU	CDU	SPD	SPD	SPD	CDU	SPD
276	Odenwald - Tauber	Nina Warken	CDU	209,418	CDU	CDU	CDU	CDU	CDU	CDU	CDU	CDU	CDU
277	Rhein-Neckar	None		196,882	CDU	CDU	CDU	CDU	CDU	CDU	CDU	CDU	CDU
278	Bruchsal - Schwetzingen	Olav Gutting	CDU	195,755	CDU	CDU	CDU	CDU	CDU	CDU	Created for 2002 election		
279	Pforzheim	Gunther Krichbaum	CDU	217,126	CDU	CDU	CDU	CDU	CDU	CDU	SPD	CDU	CDU
280	Calw	Klaus Mack	CDU	199,092	CDU	CDU	CDU	CDU	CDU	CDU	CDU	CDU	CDU
281	Freiburg	Chantal Kopf	Grüne	224,392	Grüne	CDU	CDU	SPD	SPD	SPD	SPD	CDU	CDU
282	Lörrach - Müllheim	None		231,076	CDU	CDU	CDU	CDU	SPD	SPD	SPD	CDU	CDU
283	Emmendingen - Lahr	Yannick Bury	CDU	218,872	CDU	CDU	CDU	CDU	CDU	CDU	CDU	CDU	CDU
284	Offenburg	Johannes Rothenberger	CDU	205,893	CDU	CDU	CDU	CDU	CDU	CDU	CDU	CDU	CDU
285	Rottweil - Tuttlingen	Maria-Lena Weiss	CDU	198,182	CDU	CDU	CDU	CDU	CDU	CDU	CDU	CDU	CDU
286	Schwarzwald-Baar	Thorsten Frei	CDU	162,800	CDU	CDU	CDU	CDU	CDU	CDU	CDU	CDU	CDU
287	Konstanz	Andreas Jung	CDU	206,009	CDU	CDU	CDU	CDU	CDU	CDU	CDU	CDU	CDU
288	Waldshut	Felix Schreiner	CDU	177,275	CDU	CDU	CDU	CDU	CDU	CDU	CDU	CDU	CDU
289	Reutlingen	Michael Donth	CDU	199,189	CDU	CDU	CDU	CDU	CDU	CDU	CDU	CDU	CDU
290	Tübingen	None		198,791	CDU	CDU	CDU	CDU	CDU	CDU	SPD	CDU	CDU
291	Ulm	Ronja Kemmer	CDU	223,376	CDU	CDU	CDU	CDU	CDU	CDU	CDU	CDU	CDU
292	Biberach	Wolfgang Dahler	CDU	169,147	CDU	CDU	CDU	CDU	CDU	CDU	CDU	CDU	CDU
293	Bodensee	Volker Mayer-Lay	CDU	174,430	CDU	CDU	CDU	CDU	Created for 2009 election				
294	Ravensburg	Axel Müller	CDU	187,817	CDU	CDU	CDU	CDU	Created for 2009 election				
295	Zollernalb - Sigmaringen	Thomas Bareiß	CDU	182,648	CDU	CDU	CDU	CDU	CDU	CDU	CDU	CDU	CDU

=== Bavaria (47 constituencies) ===
No	Constituency	Member	2025	Voters	2021	2017	2013	2009	2005	2002	1998	1994	1990
211	Altötting	Stephan Mayer	CSU	168,656	CSU	CSU	CSU	CSU	CSU	CSU	CSU	CSU	CSU
212	Erding – Ebersberg	Andreas Lenz	CSU	200,569	CSU	CSU	CSU	CSU	CSU	Created for 2005 election			
213	Freising	Christian Moser	CSU	237,250	CSU	CSU	CSU	CSU	CSU	CSU	CSU	CSU	CSU
214	Fürstenfeldbruck	Katrin Staffler	CSU	231,905	CSU	CSU	CSU	CSU	CSU	CSU	CSU	CSU	CSU
215	Ingolstadt	Reinhard Brandl	CSU	238,384	CSU	CSU	CSU	CSU	CSU	CSU	CSU	CSU	CSU
216	Munich North	Hans Theiss	CSU	223,683	CSU	CSU	CSU	CSU	SPD	SPD	SPD	CSU	CSU
217	Munich East	Wolfgang Stefinger	CSU	242,591	CSU	CSU	CSU	CSU	CSU	CSU	CSU	CSU	CSU
218	Munich South	None		214,606	Grüne	CSU	CSU	CSU	CSU	CSU	SPD	CSU	CSU
219	Munich West/Mitte	Stephan Pilsinger	CSU	242,252	CSU	CSU	CSU	CSU	CSU	CSU	CSU	CSU	CSU
220	Munich Land	Florian Hahn	CSU	234,912	CSU	CSU	CSU	CSU	CSU	CSU	CSU	CSU	CSU
221	Rosenheim	Daniela Ludwig	CSU	237,390	CSU	CSU	CSU	CSU	CSU	CSU	CSU	CSU	CSU
222	Bad Tölz-Wolfratshausen – Miesbach	Alexander Radwan	CSU	166,662	CSU	CSU	Created for 2017 election						
223	Starnberg – Landsberg am Lech	Michael Kießling	CSU	214,828	CSU	CSU	CSU	CSU	CSU	CSU	CSU	CSU	CSU
224	Traunstein	Siegfried Walch	CSU	208,815	CSU	CSU	CSU	CSU	CSU	CSU	CSU	CSU	CSU
225	Weilheim	Alexander Dobrindt	CSU	168,473	CSU	CSU	CSU	CSU	CSU	CSU	CSU	CSU	CSU
226	Deggendorf	Thomas Erndl	CSU	166,186	CSU	CSU	CSU	CSU	CSU	CSU	CSU	CSU	CSU
227	Landshut	Florian Oßner	CSU	246,854	CSU	CSU	CSU	CSU	CSU	CSU	CSU	CSU	CSU
228	Passau	Johann Koller	CSU	177,563	CSU	CSU	CSU	CSU	CSU	CSU	CSU	CSU	CSU
229	Rottal-Inn	Günter Baumgartner	CSU	173,632	CSU	CSU	CSU	CSU	CSU	CSU	CSU	CSU	CSU
230	Straubing	Alois Rainer	CSU	173,772	CSU	CSU	CSU	CSU	CSU	CSU	CSU	CSU	CSU
231	Amberg	Susanne Hierl	CSU	216,071	CSU	CSU	CSU	CSU	CSU	CSU	CSU	CSU	CSU
232	Regensburg	Peter Aumer	CSU	248,192	CSU	CSU	CSU	CSU	CSU	CSU	CSU	CSU	CSU
233	Schwandorf	Martina Englhardt-Kopf	CSU	222,424	CSU	CSU	CSU	CSU	CSU	CSU	CSU	CSU	CSU
234	Weiden	Albert Rupprecht	CSU	165,807	CSU	CSU	CSU	CSU	CSU	CSU	CSU	CSU	CSU
235	Bamberg	Thomas Silberhorn	CSU	182,586	CSU	CSU	CSU	CSU	CSU	CSU	CSU	CSU	CSU
236	Bayreuth	Silke Launert	CSU	162,430	CSU	CSU	CSU	CSU	CSU	CSU	CSU	CSU	CSU
237	Coburg	Jonas Geissler	CSU	156,571	CSU	CSU	CSU	CSU	CSU	CSU	SPD	CSU	CSU
238	Hof	Heiko Hain	CSU	162,872	CSU	CSU	CSU	CSU	CSU	CSU	SPD	CSU	CSU
239	Kulmbach	Emmi Zeulner	CSU	168,923	CSU	CSU	CSU	CSU	CSU	CSU	CSU	CSU	CSU
240	Ansbach	Artur Auernhammer	CSU	243,174	CSU	CSU	CSU	CSU	CSU	CSU	CSU	CSU	CSU
241	Erlangen	Konrad Körner	CSU	187,299	CSU	CSU	CSU	CSU	CSU	CSU	CSU	CSU	CSU
242	Fürth	Tobias Winkler	CSU	250,730	CSU	CSU	CSU	CSU	CSU	CSU	CSU	CSU	CSU
243	Nuremberg North	None		188,283	CSU	CSU	CSU	CSU	CSU	CSU	SPD	CSU	SPD
244	Nuremberg South	Michael Frieser	CSU	177,316	CSU	CSU	CSU	CSU	CSU	CSU	SPD	CSU	CSU
245	Roth	Ralph Edelhäußer	CSU	229,279	CSU	CSU	CSU	CSU	CSU	CSU	CSU	CSU	CSU
246	Aschaffenburg	Andrea Lindholz	CSU	182,652	CSU	CSU	CSU	CSU	CSU	CSU	CSU	CSU	CSU
247	Bad Kissingen	Dorothee Bär	CSU	214,061	CSU	CSU	CSU	CSU	CSU	CSU	CSU	CSU	CSU
248	Main-Spessart	Alexander Hoffmann	CSU	194,408	CSU	CSU	CSU	CSU	CSU	CSU	CSU	CSU	CSU
249	Schweinfurt	Anja Weisgerber	CSU	196,710	CSU	CSU	CSU	CSU	CSU	CSU	CSU	CSU	CSU
250	Würzburg	Hülya Düber	CSU	224,907	CSU	CSU	CSU	CSU	CSU	CSU	CSU	CSU	CSU
251	Augsburg-Stadt	None		207,543	CSU	CSU	CSU	CSU	CSU	CSU	CSU	CSU	CSU
252	Augsburg-Land	Hansjörg Durz	CSU	249,372	CSU	CSU	CSU	CSU	CSU	CSU	CSU	CSU	CSU
253	Donau-Ries	Ulrich Lange	CSU	195,774	CSU	CSU	CSU	CSU	CSU	CSU	CSU	CSU	CSU
254	Neu-Ulm	Alexander Engelhard	CSU	241,919	CSU	CSU	CSU	CSU	CSU	CSU	CSU	CSU	CSU
255	Memmingen – Unterallgäu	Florian Dorn	CSU	159,352	Created for 2025 election								
256	Oberallgäu	Mechthilde Wittmann	CSU	228,803	CSU	CSU	CSU	CSU	CSU	CSU	CSU	CSU	CSU
257	Ostallgäu	Stephan Stracke	CSU	250,767	CSU	CSU	CSU	CSU	CSU	CSU	CSU	CSU	CSU

=== Berlin (12 constituencies) ===
No	Constituency	Member	2025	Voters	2021	2017	2013	2009	2005	2002	1998	1994	1990
74	Berlin-Mitte	Hanna Steinmüller	Grüne	207,483	Grüne	SPD	SPD	SPD	SPD	SPD	Created for 2002 election		
75	Berlin-Pankow	Julia Schneider	Grüne	235,647	Grüne	Left	Left	Left	SPD	SPD	Created for 2002 election		
76	Berlin-Reinickendorf	Marvin Schulz	CDU	176,585	CDU	CDU	CDU	CDU	SPD	SPD	SPD	CDU	CDU
77	Berlin-Spandau – Charlottenburg North	Helmut Kleebank	SPD	180,251	SPD	SPD	CDU	CDU	SPD	SPD	SPD	CDU	CDU
78	Berlin-Steglitz-Zehlendorf	Adrian Grasse	CDU	217,814	CDU	CDU	CDU	CDU	CDU	SPD	SPD	CDU	CDU
79	Berlin-Charlottenburg-Wilmersdorf	Lukas Krieger	CDU	196,800	SPD	CDU	SPD	SPD	SPD	SPD	CDU	CDU	
80	Berlin-Tempelhof-Schöneberg	Moritz Heuberger	Grüne	231,500	SPD	CDU	CDU	CDU	SPD	SPD	Created for 2002 election		
81	Berlin-Neukölln	Ferat Koçak	Left	197,037	SPD	SPD	SPD	CDU	SPD	SPD	SPD	CDU	CDU
82	Berlin-Friedrichshain-Kreuzberg – Prenzlauer Berg East	Pascal Meiser	Left	220,014	Grüne	Grüne	Grüne	Grüne	Grüne	Grüne	Created for 2002 election		
83	Berlin-Treptow - Köpenick	Gregor Gysi	Left	207,127	Left	Left	Left	Left	Left	SPD	SPD	SPD	
84	Berlin-Marzahn - Hellersdorf	Gottfried Curio	AfD	197,988	CDU	Left	Left	Left	Left	PDS	PDS	PDS	PDS
85	Berlin-Lichtenberg	Ines Schwerdtner	Left	200,673	Left	Left	Left	Left	Left	PDS	PDS	PDS	

=== Brandenburg (10 constituencies) ===
No	Constituency	Member	2025	Voters	2021	2017	2013	2009	2005	2002	1998	1994	1990
56	Prignitz – Ostprignitz-Ruppin – Havelland I	Götz Frömming	AfD	172,726	SPD	CDU	CDU	SPD	SPD	SPD	SPD	SPD	CDU
57	Uckermark – Barnim I	Hannes Gnauck	AfD	182,836	SPD	CDU	CDU	Left	SPD	SPD	SPD	SPD	SPD
58	Oberhavel – Havelland II	No representative	AfD	249,331	SPD	CDU	CDU	SPD	SPD	SPD	SPD	SPD	SPD
59	Märkisch-Oderland – Barnim II	René Springer	AfD	230,391	SPD	CDU	CDU	Left	SPD	SPD	Created for 2002 election		
60	Brandenburg an der Havel – Potsdam-Mittelmark I – Havelland III – Teltow-Fläming I	Arne Raue	AfD	202,955	SPD	CDU	SPD	SPD	SPD	SPD	SPD	SPD	SPD
61	Potsdam – Potsdam-Mittelmark II – Teltow-Fläming II	Olaf Scholz	SPD	232,797	SPD	SPD	CDU	SPD	SPD	SPD	SPD	SPD	SPD
62	Dahme-Spreewald – Teltow-Fläming III	Steffen Kotré	AfD	252,744	SPD	CDU	CDU	SPD	SPD	SPD	Created for 2002 election		
63	Frankfurt (Oder) – Oder-Spree	Rainer Galla	AfD	191,387	SPD	CDU	CDU	Left	SPD	SPD	SPD	SPD	CDU
64	Cottbus – Spree-Neiße	Lars Schieske	AfD	171,267	SPD	CDU	CDU	Left	SPD	SPD	SPD	SPD	CDU
65	Elbe-Elster – Oberspreewald-Lausitz	Birgit Bessin	AfD	162,410	SPD	CDU	CDU	CDU	SPD	SPD	Created for 2002 election		

=== Bremen (2 constituencies) ===
No	Constituency	Member	2025	Voters	2021	2017	2013	2009	2005	2002	1998	1994	1990
54	Bremen I	None		245,384	SPD	SPD	SPD	SPD	SPD	SPD	SPD	SPD	SPD
55	Bremen II – Bremerhaven	Uwe Schmidt	SPD	214,365	SPD	SPD	SPD	SPD	SPD	SPD	SPD	SPD	SPD

=== Hamburg (6 constituencies) ===
No	Constituency	Member	2025	Voters	2021	2017	2013	2009	2005	2002	1998	1994	1990
18	Hamburg-Mitte	Falko Droßmann	SPD	242,078	SPD	SPD	SPD	SPD	SPD	SPD	SPD	SPD	SPD
19	Hamburg-Altona	Linda Heitmann	Grüne	187,705	Grüne	SPD	SPD	SPD	SPD	SPD	SPD	SPD	SPD
20	Hamburg-Eimsbüttel	Till Steffen	Grüne	193,823	Grüne	SPD	SPD	CDU	SPD	SPD	SPD	SPD	SPD
21	Hamburg-Nord	Christoph Ploß	CDU	219,909	SPD	CDU	CDU	CDU	SPD	SPD	SPD	CDU	CDU
22	Hamburg- Wandsbek	Aydan Özoğuz	SPD	233,483	SPD	SPD	SPD	CDU	SPD	SPD	SPD	SPD	SPD
23	Hamburg-Bergedorf – Harburg	Metin Hakverdi	SPD	221,794	SPD	SPD	SPD	SPD	SPD	SPD	Created for 2002 election		

=== Hesse (22 constituencies) ===
No	Constituency	Member	2025	Voters	2021	2017	2013	2009	2005	2002	1998	1994	1990
166	Waldeck	Jan-Wilhelm Pohlmann	CDU	184,073	SPD	SPD	CDU	SPD	SPD	SPD	SPD	SPD	SPD
167	Kassel	Daniel Bettermann	SPD	218,474	SPD	SPD	SPD	SPD	SPD	SPD	SPD	SPD	SPD
168	Werra-Meißner – Hersfeld-Rotenburg	Wilhelm Gebhard	CDU	171,886	SPD	SPD	SPD	SPD	SPD	SPD	Created for 2002 election		
169	Schwalm-Eder	No representative	CDU	185,944	SPD	SPD	SPD	SPD	SPD	SPD	SPD	SPD	SPD
170	Marburg	Sören Bartol	SPD	181,588	SPD	SPD	SPD	SPD	SPD	SPD	SPD	SPD	CDU
171	Lahn-Dill	Johannes Volkmann	CDU	206,532	SPD	CDU	CDU	CDU	SPD	SPD	SPD	SPD	SPD
172	Gießen	Frederik Bouffier	CDU	217,514	SPD	CDU	CDU	CDU	SPD	SPD	SPD	SPD	SPD
173	Fulda	Michael Brand	CDU	208,542	CDU	CDU	CDU	CDU	CDU	CDU	CDU	CDU	CDU
174	Main-Kinzig – Wetterau II – Schotten	Johannes Wiegelmann	CDU	178,307	SPD	CDU	CDU	Created for 2013 election					
175	Hochtaunus	Markus Koob	CDU	179,842	CDU	CDU	CDU	CDU	CDU	CDU	CDU	CDU	CDU
176	Wetterau I	Thomas Pauls	CDU	176,897	SPD	CDU	CDU	CDU	SPD	SPD	SPD	CDU	CDU
177	Rheingau-Taunus – Limburg	Klaus-Peter Willsch	CDU	220,466	CDU	CDU	CDU	CDU	CDU	CDU	CDU	CDU	CDU
178	Wiesbaden	Stefan Korbach	CDU	186,735	CDU	CDU	CDU	CDU	SPD	SPD	SPD	CDU	CDU
179	Hanau	Pascal Reddig	CDU	176,271	SPD	CDU	CDU	CDU	SPD	SPD	SPD	CDU	CDU
180	Main-Taunus	Norbert Altenkamp	CDU	195,514	CDU	CDU	CDU	CDU	CDU	CDU	Created for 2002 election		
181	Frankfurt am Main I	No representative	CDU	201,216	SPD	CDU	CDU	CDU	SPD	SPD	CDU	CDU	CDU
182	Frankfurt am Main II	No representative	CDU	227,207	Grüne	CDU	CDU	CDU	CDU	SPD	SPD	CDU	CDU
183	Groß-Gerau	No representative	CDU	174,082	SPD	CDU	CDU	CDU	SPD	SPD	SPD	CDU	SPD
184	Offenbach	Björn Simon	CDU	219,511	CDU	CDU	CDU	CDU	CDU	SPD	SPD	CDU	CDU
185	Darmstadt	No representative	CDU	240,763	SPD	CDU	SPD	SPD	SPD	SPD	CDU	SPD	
186	Odenwald	Patricia Lips	CDU	233,901	SPD	CDU	CDU	CDU	CDU	SPD	SPD	CDU	CDU
187	Bergstraße	Michael Meister	CDU	197,782	CDU	CDU	CDU	CDU	CDU	SPD	SPD	CDU	CDU

=== Lower Saxony (30 constituencies) ===
No	Constituency	Member	2025	Voters	2021	2017	2013	2009	2005	2002	1998	1994	1990
24	Aurich – Emden	Johann Saathoff	SPD	191,846	SPD	SPD	SPD	SPD	SPD	SPD	SPD	SPD	SPD
25	Unterems	Gitta Connemann	CDU	238,506	CDU	CDU	CDU	CDU	CDU	CDU	CDU	CDU	CDU
26	Friesland – Wilhelmshaven – Wittmund	Siemtje Möller	SPD	189,047	SPD	SPD	SPD	SPD	SPD	SPD	SPD	SPD	SPD
27	Oldenburg - Ammerland	Dennis Rohde	SPD	228,705	SPD	SPD	SPD	CDU	SPD	SPD	SPD	SPD	SPD
28	Delmenhorst – Wesermarsch – Oldenburg-Land	Bastian Ernst	CDU	226,827	SPD	CDU	CDU	CDU	SPD	SPD	SPD	SPD	SPD
29	Cuxhaven – Stade II	Christoph Frauenpreiß	CDU	188,602	SPD	CDU	CDU	CDU	Created for 2009 election				
30	Stade I – Rotenburg II	Vanessa-Kim Zobel	CDU	198,576	CDU	CDU	CDU	CDU	Abolished		SPD	CDU	CDU
31	Mittelems	Albert Stegemann	CDU	233,253	CDU	CDU	CDU	CDU	CDU	CDU	CDU	CDU	CDU
32	Cloppenburg - Vechta	Silvia Breher	CDU	223,948	CDU	CDU	CDU	CDU	CDU	CDU	CDU	CDU	CDU
33	Diepholz – Nienburg I	Axel Knoerig	CDU	194,371	CDU	CDU	CDU	CDU	SPD	SPD	SPD	CDU	CDU
34	Osterholz – Verden	Andreas Mattfeldt	CDU	197,490	CDU	CDU	CDU	CDU	Abolished		SPD	SPD	SPD
35	Rotenburg I - Heidekreis	Lars Klingbeil	SPD	168,927	SPD	SPD	CDU	CDU	Abolished		SPD	CDU	CDU
36	Harburg	Cornell-Annette Babendererde	CDU	201,740	SPD	CDU	CDU	CDU	Abolished		SPD	CDU	CDU
37	Lüchow-Dannenberg – Lüneburg	Jakob Blankenburg	SPD	182,673	SPD	CDU	CDU	CDU	SPD	SPD	SPD	CDU	CDU
38	Osnabrück-Land	Lutz Brinkmann	CDU	199,960	CDU	CDU	CDU	CDU	CDU	CDU	CDU	CDU	CDU
39	Stadt Osnabrück	Mathias Middelberg	CDU	195,467	SPD	CDU	CDU	CDU	SPD	SPD	SPD	CDU	CDU
40	Nienburg II – Schaumburg	Marja-Liisa Völlers	SPD	193,863	SPD	CDU	SPD	SPD	SPD	SPD	SPD	SPD	CDU
41	Stadt Hannover I	Adis Ahmetovic	SPD	176,770	SPD	SPD	SPD	SPD	SPD	SPD	SPD	SPD	SPD
42	Stadt Hannover II	Boris Pistorius	SPD	190,336	SPD	SPD	SPD	SPD	SPD	SPD	SPD	SPD	SPD
43	Hannover-Land I	Hendrik Hoppenstedt	CDU	231,250	SPD	CDU	CDU	SPD	SPD	SPD	SPD	CDU	CDU
44	Celle – Uelzen	Henning Otte	CDU	214,482	CDU	CDU	CDU	CDU	SPD	SPD	SPD	CDU	CDU
45	Gifhorn – Peine	Hubertus Heil	SPD	219,966	SPD	SPD	SPD	SPD	SPD	SPD	SPD	CDU	CDU
46	Hameln-Pyrmont – Holzminden	Johannes Schraps	SPD	184,471	SPD	SPD	SPD	SPD	SPD	SPD	SPD	SPD	SPD
47	Hannover-Land II	Matthias Miersch	SPD	238,323	SPD	SPD	SPD	SPD	SPD	SPD	SPD	CDU	CDU
48	Hildesheim	Daniela Rump	SPD	215,131	SPD	SPD	CDU	SPD	SPD	SPD	SPD	SPD	SPD
49	Salzgitter - Wolfenbüttel	Dunja Kreiser	SPD	200,922	SPD	SPD	SPD	SPD	SPD	SPD	SPD	SPD	SPD
50	Braunschweig	Christos Pantazis	SPD	187,721	SPD	SPD	SPD	SPD	SPD	SPD	SPD	SPD	CDU
51	Helmstedt – Wolfsburg	Alexander Jordan	CDU	180,147	SPD	SPD	CDU	CDU	SPD	SPD	SPD	CDU	CDU
52	Goslar – Northeim – Göttingen II	Frauke Heiligenstadt	SPD	197,519	SPD	CDU	SPD	SPD	SPD	SPD	SPD	SPD	SPD
53	Göttingen	Fritz Güntzler	CDU	214,542	SPD	SPD	SPD	SPD	SPD	SPD	SPD	CDU	CDU

=== Mecklenburg-Vorpommern (6 constituencies) ===
No	Constituency	Member	2025	Voters	2021	2017	2013	2009	2005	2002	1998	1994	1990
12	Schwerin – Ludwigslust-Parchim I – Nordwestmecklenburg I	Leif-Erik Holm	AfD	214,853	SPD	CDU	CDU	CDU	SPD	SPD	Created for 2002 election		
13	Ludwigslust-Parchim II – Nordwestmecklenburg II – Landkreis Rostock I	Christoph Grimm	AfD	205,042	SPD	CDU	CDU	CDU	SPD	SPD	Created for 2002 election		
14	Rostock – Landkreis Rostock II	No representative	AfD	222,705	SPD	CDU	CDU	Left	SPD	SPD	SPD	SPD	SPD
15	Vorpommern-Rügen – Vorpommern-Greifswald I	Dario Seifert	AfD	241,066	SPD	CDU	CDU	CDU	CDU	CDU	CDU	CDU	CDU
16	Mecklenburgische Seenplatte I – Vorpommern-Greifswald II	Enrico Komning	AfD	221,421	SPD	CDU	CDU	Created for 2013 election					
17	Mecklenburgische Seenplatte II – Landkreis Rostock III	Ulrike Schielke-Ziesing	AfD	209,348	SPD	CDU	CDU	CDU	SPD	SPD	Created for 2002 election		

=== North Rhine-Westphalia (64 constituencies) ===
No	Constituency	Member	2025	Voters	2021	2017	2013	2009	2005	2002	1998	1994	1990
86	Aachen I	Armin Laschet	CDU	176,306	Grüne	CDU	CDU	CDU	SPD	SPD	SPD	CDU	CDU
87	Aachen II	Catarina dos Santos-Wintz	CDU	226,420	SPD	SPD	CDU	CDU	SPD	SPD	SPD	SPD	SPD
88	Heinsberg	Wilfried Oellers	CDU	192,346	CDU	CDU	CDU	CDU	CDU	CDU	CDU	CDU	CDU
89	Düren	Thomas Rachel	CDU	199,656	CDU	CDU	CDU	CDU	CDU	SPD	SPD	CDU	CDU
90	Rhein-Erft-Kreis I	Georg Kippels	CDU	249,035	CDU	CDU	CDU	CDU	SPD	SPD	SPD	SPD	SPD
91	Euskirchen – Rhein-Erft-Kreis II	Detlef Seif	CDU	249,198	CDU	CDU	CDU	CDU	CDU	CDU	CDU	CDU	CDU
92	Cologne I	Sanae Abdi	SPD	190,630	SPD	CDU	SPD	SPD	SPD	SPD	SPD	SPD	SPD
93	Cologne II	Sven Lehmann	Grüne	242,483	Grüne	CDU	CDU	CDU	SPD	SPD	SPD	CDU	CDU
94	Cologne III	Katharina Dröge	Grüne	204,539	SPD	SPD	SPD	SPD	SPD	SPD	SPD	SPD	SPD
95	Bonn	Hendrik Streeck	CDU	230,215	Grüne	SPD	SPD	SPD	SPD	SPD	CDU	CDU	CDU
96	Rhein-Sieg-Kreis I	Elisabeth Winkelmeier-Becker	CDU	238,627	CDU	CDU	CDU	CDU	CDU	SPD	SPD	CDU	CDU
97	Rhein-Sieg-Kreis II	Norbert Röttgen	CDU	216,063	CDU	CDU	CDU	CDU	CDU	CDU	CDU	CDU	CDU
98	Oberbergischer Kreis	Carsten Brodesser	CDU	206,640	CDU	CDU	CDU	CDU	CDU	CDU	SPD	CDU	CDU
99	Rheinisch-Bergischer Kreis	Caroline Bosbach	CDU	217,193	CDU	CDU	CDU	CDU	CDU	CDU	CDU	CDU	CDU
100	Leverkusen – Cologne IV	Karl Lauterbach	SPD	209,102	SPD	SPD	SPD	SPD	SPD	SPD	Created for 2002 election		
101	Wuppertal I	Helge Lindh	SPD	202,528	SPD	SPD	SPD	SPD	SPD	SPD	SPD	SPD	SPD
102	Solingen – Remscheid – Wuppertal II	Jürgen Hardt	CDU	220,204	SPD	CDU	CDU	CDU	SPD	SPD	SPD	SPD	CDU
103	Mettmann I	Klaus Wiener	CDU	203,030	CDU	CDU	CDU	CDU	CDU	SPD	SPD	CDU	CDU
104	Mettmann II	Peter Beyer	CDU	160,175	CDU	CDU	CDU	CDU	SPD	SPD	SPD	CDU	CDU
105	Düsseldorf I	Thomas Jarzombek	CDU	220,827	CDU	CDU	CDU	CDU	CDU	SPD	SPD	CDU	CDU
106	Düsseldorf II	Johannes Winkel	CDU	190,102	SPD	CDU	CDU	CDU	SPD	SPD	SPD	SPD	SPD
107	Neuss I	Carl-Philipp Sassenrath	CDU	213,250	CDU	CDU	CDU	CDU	CDU	SPD	CDU	CDU	CDU
108	Mönchengladbach	Günter Krings	CDU	185,185	CDU	CDU	CDU	CDU	CDU	CDU	SPD	CDU	CDU
109	Krefeld I – Neuss II	Ansgar Heveling	CDU	200,048	CDU	CDU	CDU	CDU	CDU	CDU	Created for 2002 election		
110	Viersen	Martin Plum	CDU	227,166	CDU	CDU	CDU	CDU	CDU	CDU	CDU	CDU	CDU
111	Kleve	Stefan Rouenhoff	CDU	224,463	CDU	CDU	CDU	CDU	CDU	CDU	CDU	CDU	CDU
112	Wesel I	Sascha van Beek	CDU	206,270	SPD	CDU	CDU	CDU	SPD	SPD	SPD	SPD	SPD
113	Krefeld II – Wesel II	Kerstin Radomski	CDU	175,852	SPD	CDU	SPD	SPD	SPD	SPD	Created for 2002 election		
114	Duisburg I	Bärbel Bas	SPD	163,394	SPD	SPD	SPD	SPD	SPD	SPD	SPD	SPD	SPD
115	Duisburg II	Mahmut Özdemir	SPD	155,265	SPD	SPD	SPD	SPD	SPD	SPD	SPD	SPD	SPD
116	Oberhausen – Wesel III	Dirk Vöpel	SPD	199,156	SPD	SPD	SPD	SPD	SPD	SPD	SPD	SPD	SPD
117	Mülheim – Essen I	Sebastian Fiedler	SPD	182,895	SPD	SPD	SPD	SPD	SPD	SPD	SPD	SPD	SPD
118	Essen II	Ingo Vogel	SPD	156,298	SPD	SPD	SPD	SPD	SPD	SPD	SPD	SPD	SPD
119	Essen III	Matthias Hauer	CDU	190,335	CDU	CDU	CDU	SPD	SPD	SPD	SPD	SPD	SPD
120	Recklinghausen I	Frank Schwabe	SPD	165,193	SPD	SPD	SPD	SPD	SPD	SPD	SPD	SPD	SPD
121	Recklinghausen II	Lars Ehm	CDU	186,413	SPD	SPD	SPD	SPD	SPD	SPD	SPD	SPD	SPD
122	Gelsenkirchen	Markus Töns	SPD	168,496	SPD	SPD	SPD	SPD	SPD	SPD	SPD	SPD	SPD
123	Steinfurt I – Borken I	Jens Spahn	CDU	202,388	CDU	CDU	CDU	CDU	CDU	CDU	Created for 2002 election		
124	Bottrop – Recklinghausen III	Nicklas Kappe	CDU	199,344	SPD	SPD	SPD	SPD	SPD	SPD	SPD	SPD	SPD
125	Borken II	Anne König	CDU	201,102	CDU	CDU	CDU	CDU	CDU	CDU	CDU	CDU	CDU
126	Coesfeld – Steinfurt II	Marc Henrichmann	CDU	194,695	CDU	CDU	CDU	CDU	CDU	CDU	CDU	CDU	CDU
127	Steinfurt III	Anja Karliczek	CDU	195,513	CDU	CDU	CDU	CDU	SPD	SPD	SPD	SPD	CDU
128	Münster	Maria Klein-Schmeink	Grüne	233,953	Grüne	CDU	CDU	CDU	SPD	SPD	CDU	CDU	CDU
129	Warendorf	Henning Rehbaum	CDU	208,754	CDU	CDU	CDU	CDU	CDU	CDU	CDU	CDU	CDU
130	Gütersloh I	Ralph Brinkhaus	CDU	234,177	CDU	CDU	CDU	CDU	CDU	CDU	CDU	CDU	CDU
131	Bielefeld – Gütersloh II	Wiebke Esdar	SPD	243,059	SPD	SPD	SPD	CDU	SPD	SPD	SPD	SPD	SPD
132	Herford – Minden-Lübbecke II	Joachim Ebmeyer	CDU	226,894	SPD	SPD	SPD	SPD	SPD	SPD	SPD	SPD	SPD
133	Minden-Lübbecke I	Oliver Vogt	CDU	201,888	SPD	SPD	CDU	CDU	SPD	SPD	SPD	SPD	SPD
134	Lippe I	Kerstin Vieregge	CDU	224,415	SPD	CDU	SPD	SPD	SPD	SPD	SPD	SPD	SPD
135	Höxter – Gütersloh III – Lippe II	Christian Haase	CDU	172,435	CDU	CDU	CDU	CDU	CDU	CDU	CDU	CDU	
136	Paderborn	Carsten Linnemann	CDU	231,534	CDU	CDU	CDU	CDU	CDU	CDU	CDU	CDU	CDU
137	Hagen – Ennepe-Ruhr-Kreis I	Tijen Ataoğlu	CDU	201,594	SPD	SPD	SPD	SPD	SPD	SPD	SPD	SPD	SPD
138	Ennepe-Ruhr-Kreis II	Katja Strauss-Köster	CDU	175,283	SPD	SPD	SPD	SPD	SPD	SPD	SPD	SPD	SPD
139	Bochum I	Serdar Yüksel	SPD	202,393	SPD	SPD	SPD	SPD	SPD	SPD	SPD	SPD	SPD
140	Herne – Bochum II	Hendrik Bollmann	SPD	173,939	SPD	SPD	SPD	SPD	SPD	SPD	SPD	SPD	SPD
141	Dortmund I	Jens Peick	SPD	206,727	SPD	SPD	SPD	SPD	SPD	SPD	SPD	SPD	SPD
142	Dortmund II	Sabine Poschmann	SPD	199,317	SPD	SPD	SPD	SPD	SPD	SPD	SPD	SPD	SPD
143	Unna I	Oliver Kaczmarek	SPD	194,493	SPD	SPD	SPD	SPD	SPD	SPD	SPD	SPD	SPD
144	Hamm – Unna II	Michael Thews	SPD	231,226	SPD	SPD	SPD	SPD	SPD	SPD	SPD	SPD	SPD
145	Soest	Oliver Pöpsel	CDU	231,811	CDU	CDU	CDU	CDU	CDU	CDU	SPD	CDU	CDU
146	Hochsauerlandkreis	Friedrich Merz	CDU	200,496	CDU	CDU	CDU	CDU	CDU	CDU	CDU	CDU	CDU
147	Siegen-Wittgenstein	Benedikt Büdenbender	CDU	207,672	CDU	CDU	CDU	CDU	SPD	SPD	SPD	CDU	CDU
148	Olpe – Märkischer Kreis I	Florian Müller	CDU	203,350	CDU	CDU	CDU	CDU	CDU	CDU	CDU	CDU	CDU
149	Märkischer Kreis II	Paul Ziemiak	CDU	195,816	CDU	SPD	SPD	SPD	SPD	SPD	SPD	SPD	SPD

=== Rhineland-Palatinate (15 constituencies) ===
No	Constituency	Member	2025	Voters	2021	2017	2013	2009	2005	2002	1998	1994	1990
196	Neuwied	Ellen Demuth	CDU	236,097	CDU	CDU	CDU	CDU	SPD	SPD	SPD	CDU	CDU
197	Ahrweiler	Mechthild Heil	CDU	191,196	CDU	CDU	CDU	CDU	CDU	CDU	CDU	CDU	CDU
198	Koblenz	Josef Oster	CDU	189,619	CDU	CDU	CDU	CDU	CDU	CDU	CDU	CDU	CDU
199	Mosel/Rhein-Hunsrück	Marlon Bröhr	CDU	168,634	CDU	CDU	CDU	CDU	CDU	CDU	CDU	CDU	CDU
200	Kreuznach	Julia Klöckner	CDU	179,528	SPD	CDU	CDU	CDU	CDU	SPD	SPD	SPD	SPD
201	Bitburg	Patrick Schnieder	CDU	161,723	CDU	CDU	CDU	CDU	CDU	CDU	CDU	CDU	CDU
202	Trier	No representative	CDU	187,536	SPD	CDU	CDU	CDU	CDU	SPD	SPD	CDU	CDU
203	Montabaur	Harald Orthey	CDU	209,489	SPD	CDU	CDU	CDU	CDU	CDU	SPD	CDU	CDU
204	Mainz	No representative	CDU	251,092	SPD	CDU	CDU	CDU	SPD	SPD	SPD	CDU	CDU
205	Worms	Jan Metzler	CDU	211,985	CDU	CDU	CDU	SPD	SPD	SPD	SPD	SPD	SPD
206	Ludwigshafen/Frankenthal	No representative	CDU	205,998	SPD	CDU	CDU	CDU	SPD	SPD	SPD	CDU	CDU
207	Neustadt – Speyer	Johannes Steiniger	CDU	217,120	CDU	CDU	CDU	CDU	CDU	CDU	CDU	CDU	CDU
208	Kaiserslautern	Matthias Mieves	SPD	219,832	SPD	SPD	SPD	SPD	SPD	SPD	SPD	SPD	SPD
209	Pirmasens	Florian Bilic	CDU	167,724	SPD	CDU	CDU	CDU	CDU	CDU	SPD	CDU	CDU
210	Südpfalz	Thomas Gebhart	CDU	216,108	SPD	CDU	CDU	CDU	CDU	CDU	CDU	CDU	CDU

=== Saarland (4 constituencies) ===
No	Constituency	Member	2025	Voters	2021	2017	2013	2009	2005	2002	1998	1994	1990
296	Saarbrücken	Josephine Ortleb	SPD	192,929	SPD	SPD	CDU	CDU	SPD	SPD	SPD	SPD	SPD
297	Saarlouis	Philip Hoffmann	CDU	203,279	SPD	CDU	CDU	CDU	SPD	SPD	SPD	SPD	SPD
298	St. Wendel	Roland Theis	CDU	173,074	SPD	CDU	CDU	CDU	SPD	SPD	SPD	SPD	SPD
299	Homburg	Esra Limbacher	SPD	185,941	SPD	CDU	CDU	CDU	SPD	SPD	SPD	SPD	SPD

=== Saxony (16 constituencies) ===
No	Constituency	Member	2025	Voters	2021	2017	2013	2009	2005	2002	1998	1994	1990
150	Nordsachsen	René Bochmann	AfD	161,279	AfD	CDU	CDU	CDU	CDU	CDU	SPD	CDU	CDU
151	Leipzig I	No representative	AfD	224,100	CDU	CDU	CDU	CDU	SPD	SPD	SPD	CDU	CDU
152	Leipzig II	Sören Pellmann	Left	231,178	Left	Left	CDU	CDU	SPD	SPD	SPD	CDU	CDU
153	Leipzig-Land	Edgar Naujok	AfD	212,854	AfD	CDU	CDU	CDU	CDU	SPD	SPD	CDU	CDU
154	Meißen	Christian Reck	AfD	197,004	AfD	CDU	CDU	CDU	Created for 2009 election				
155	Bautzen I	Karsten Hilse	AfD	206,895	AfD	AfD	CDU	CDU	Created for 2009 election				
156	Görlitz	Tino Chrupalla	AfD	204,105	AfD	AfD	CDU	CDU	CDU	CDU	CDU	CDU	CDU
157	Sächsische Schweiz-Osterzgebirge	Steffen Janich	AfD	199,703	AfD	AfD	CDU	CDU	CDU	CDU	Created for 2002 election		
158	Dresden I	Thomas Ladzinski	AfD	228,643	CDU	CDU	CDU	CDU	CDU	CDU	CDU	CDU	CDU
159	Dresden II – Bautzen II	Matthias Rentzsch	AfD	234,432	CDU	CDU	CDU	CDU	CDU	CDU	CDU	CDU	CDU
160	Mittelsachsen	Carolin Bachmann	AfD	193,828	AfD	CDU	CDU	CDU	Created for 2009 election				
161	Chemnitz	Alexander Gauland	AfD	188,691	SPD	CDU	CDU	CDU	SPD	SPD	SPD	CDU	CDU
162	Chemnitzer Umland – Erzgebirgskreis II	Maximilian Krah	AfD	177,211	AfD	CDU	CDU	CDU	Created for 2009 election				
163	Erzgebirgskreis I	Thomas Dietz	AfD	210,941	AfD	CDU	CDU	CDU	Created for 2009 election				
164	Zwickau	Matthias Moosdorf	AfD	197,831	AfD	CDU	CDU	CDU	CDU	CDU	CDU	CDU	CDU
165	Vogtlandkreis	Mathias Weiser	AfD	184,973	CDU	CDU	CDU	CDU	CDU	CDU	SPD	CDU	CDU

=== Saxony-Anhalt (8 constituencies) ===
No	Constituency	Member	2025	Voters	2021	2017	2013	2009	2005	2002	1998	1994	1990
66	Altmark – Jerichower Land	Thomas Korell	AfD	159,998	SPD	CDU	CDU	Left	SPD	SPD	SPD	SPD	CDU
67	Börde – Salzlandkreis	Jan Wenzel Schmidt	AfD	215,532	SPD	CDU	CDU	CDU	Created for 2009 election				
68	Harz	Christina Baum	AfD	207,942	CDU	CDU	CDU	CDU	SPD	SPD	SPD	CDU	CDU
69	Magdeburg	Claudia Weiss	AfD	229,198	CDU	CDU	Left	SPD	SPD	SPD	SPD	CDU	
70	Anhalt – Dessau – Wittenberg	Volker Scheurell	AfD	169,749	CDU	CDU	CDU	CDU	Created for 2009 election				
71	Halle	No representative	AfD	209,765	SPD	CDU	CDU	Left	SPD	SPD	SPD	SPD	FDP
72	Burgenland – Saalekreis	Martin Reichardt	AfD	184,352	CDU	CDU	CDU	CDU	SPD	SPD	SPD	CDU	CDU
73	Mansfeld	Kay-Uwe Ziegler	AfD	198,676	AfD	CDU	CDU	Left	SPD	SPD	SPD	CDU	CDU

=== Schleswig-Holstein (11 constituencies) ===
No	Constituency	Member	2025	Voters	2021	2017	2013	2009	2005	2002	1998	1994	1990
1	Flensburg – Schleswig	No representative	CDU	231,536	Grüne	CDU	CDU	CDU	SPD	SPD	SPD	CDU	CDU
2	Nordfriesland – Dithmarschen Nord	Leif Bodin	CDU	188,267	CDU	CDU	CDU	CDU	CDU	CDU	SPD	CDU	CDU
3	Steinburg – Dithmarschen Süd	Mark Helfrich	CDU	176,899	CDU	CDU	CDU	CDU	CDU	SPD	SPD	CDU	CDU
4	Rendsburg - Eckernförde	Johann Wadephul	CDU	202,226	SPD	CDU	CDU	CDU	CDU	SPD	SPD	CDU	CDU
5	Kiel	Luise Amtsberg	Grüne	202,482	SPD	SPD	SPD	SPD	SPD	SPD	SPD	SPD	SPD
6	Plön – Neumünster	Sandra Carstensen	CDU	174,908	SPD	CDU	CDU	CDU	SPD	SPD	SPD	CDU	CDU
7	Pinneberg	Daniel Kölbl	CDU	238,388	SPD	CDU	CDU	CDU	CDU	SPD	SPD	CDU	CDU
8	Segeberg – Stormarn-Mitte	Melanie Bernstein	CDU	249,202	SPD	CDU	CDU	CDU	CDU	SPD	SPD	CDU	CDU
9	Ostholstein – Stormarn-Nord	Sebastian Schmidt	CDU	183,138	SPD	CDU	CDU	CDU	SPD	SPD	SPD	CDU	CDU
10	Herzogtum Lauenburg – Stormarn-Süd	Henri Schmidt	CDU	246,277	SPD	CDU	CDU	CDU	CDU	SPD	SPD	CDU	CDU
11	Lübeck	Tim Klüssendorf	SPD	179,394	SPD	CDU	SPD	SPD	SPD	SPD	SPD	SPD	SPD

=== Thuringia (8 constituencies) ===
No	Constituency	Member	2025	Voters	2021	2017	2013	2009	2005	2002	1998	1994	1990
188	Eichsfeld – Nordhausen – Kyffhäuserkreis	Christopher Drößler	AfD	209,203	CDU	CDU	CDU	CDU	CDU	CDU	CDU	CDU	CDU
189	Eisenach – Wartburgkreis – Unstrut-Hainich-Kreis	Stefan Möller	AfD	212,267	AfD	CDU	CDU	CDU	SPD	SPD	SPD	CDU	CDU
190	Jena – Sömmerda – Weimarer Land I	Stefan Schröder	AfD	198,697	SPD	CDU	CDU	CDU	CDU	SPD	SPD	CDU	CDU
191	Gotha – Ilm-Kreis	Marcus Bühl	AfD	190,519	AfD	CDU	CDU	CDU	SPD	SPD	SPD	CDU	CDU
192	Erfurt – Weimar – Weimarer Land II	Bodo Ramelow	Left	217,944	SPD	CDU	CDU	CDU	SPD	Created for 2005 election			
193	Gera – Greiz – Altenburger Land	Stephan Brandner	AfD	229,588	AfD	CDU	CDU	CDU	CDU	SPD	SPD	CDU	CDU
194	Saalfeld-Rudolstadt – Saale-Holzland-Kreis – Saale-Orla-Kreis	Michael Kaufmann	AfD	219,437	AfD	CDU	CDU	CDU	SPD	SPD	Created for 2002 election		
195	Suhl – Schmalkalden-Meiningen – Hildburghausen – Sonneberg	Robert Teske	AfD	230,071	SPD	CDU	CDU	Left	SPD	SPD	SPD	CDU	CDU

== See also ==
- List of constituencies and constituency associations of the Weimar Republic
