= Plön – Neumünster =

Federal electoral district of Germany

6 Plön – Neumünster
- Electoral district for the Bundestag
- Plön – Neumünster in 2025
- State: Schleswig-Holstein
- Population: 223,000 (2019)
- Electorate: 174,908 (2021)
- Major settlements: Neumünster; Plön
- Area: 1,302.4 km^{2}

Current electoral district
- Created: 1976
- Party: CDU
- Member: Sandra Carstensen
- Elected: 2025

Plön – Neumünster is an electoral constituency (German: Wahlkreis) represented in the Bundestag. It elects one member via first-past-the-post voting. Under the current constituency numbering system, it is designated as constituency 6. It is located in central eastern Schleswig-Holstein, comprising the Plön district, the urban district of Neumünster and part of the Segeberg district.

Plön – Neumünster was created for the 1976 federal election. From 2021 to 2025, it was represented by Kristian Klinck of the Social Democratic Party (SPD). Since 2025 it has been represented by Sandra Carstensen of the CDU.

== Geography ==
Plön – Neumünster is located in central eastern Schleswig-Holstein. As of the 2021 federal election, it comprises the entirety of the district of Plön and the urban district of Neumünster, as well as the Amt of Boostedt-Rickling from the Segeberg district.

== History ==
Plön – Neumünster was created in 1976 and contained parts of the abolished constituencies of Rendsburg – Neumünster and Plön. Originally, it comprised only the district of Plön and the urban district of Neumünster. In the 2002 election, the Amt of Boostedt-Rickling was transferred to Plön – Neumünster from the Segeberg – Stormarn-Nord constituency.

Election	No.	Name	Borders
1976	6	Plön – Neumünster	Plön district; Neumünster city
1980	6	Plön – Neumünster	Plön district; Neumünster city
1983	6	Plön – Neumünster	Plön district; Neumünster city
1987	6	Plön – Neumünster	Plön district; Neumünster city
1990	6	Plön – Neumünster	Plön district; Neumünster city
1994	6	Plön – Neumünster	Plön district; Neumünster city
1998	6	Plön – Neumünster	Plön district; Neumünster city
2002	6	Plön – Neumünster	Plön district; Neumünster city; Segeberg district (only Boostedt-Rickling Amt)
2005	6	Plön – Neumünster	Plön district; Neumünster city; Segeberg district (only Boostedt-Rickling Amt)
2009	6	Plön – Neumünster	Plön district; Neumünster city; Segeberg district (only Boostedt-Rickling Amt)
2013	6	Plön – Neumünster	Plön district; Neumünster city; Segeberg district (only Boostedt-Rickling Amt)
2017	6	Plön – Neumünster	Plön district; Neumünster city; Segeberg district (only Boostedt-Rickling Amt)
2021	6	Plön – Neumünster	Plön district; Neumünster city; Segeberg district (only Boostedt-Rickling Amt)
2025	6	Plön – Neumünster	Plön district; Neumünster city; Segeberg district (only Boostedt-Rickling Amt)

== Members ==
The constituency has frequently changed hands since its creation in 1976. It was first held by the Social Democratic Party (SPD) from 1976 until 1983, during which time it was represented by Horst Jungmann. It was then won by the Christian Democratic Union (CDU), and represented by Karl Eigen for a single term. Former SPD member Jungmann regained it for a single term in 1987. The CDU's Helmut Lamp won in 1990, but it again returned to the SPD in 1998. From then until 2009, it was represented by Michael Bürsch. Philipp Murmann of the CDU won the constituency in 2009, and was re-elected in 2013. He was succeeded by party fellow Melanie Bernstein in 2017, who was defeated by the SPD's Kristian Klinck in 2021.

Election	Member	Party	%
1976	Horst Jungmann	SPD	49.1
1980	Horst Jungmann	SPD	51.4
1983	Karl Eigen	CDU	48.4
1987	Horst Jungmann	SPD	45.8
1990	Helmut Lamp	CDU	44.5
1994	Helmut Lamp	CDU	45.1
1998	Michael Bürsch	SPD	51.2
2002	Michael Bürsch	SPD	47.9
2005	Michael Bürsch	SPD	47.0
2009	Philipp Murmann	CDU	38.6
2013	Philipp Murmann	CDU	43.7
2017	Melanie Bernstein	CDU	40.7
2021	Kristian Klinck	SPD	31.4
2025	Sandra Carstensen	CDU	32.7

== Election results ==
=== 2025 election ===
Federal election (2025): Plön – Neumünster
Notes:	Blue background denotes the winner of the electorate vote. Pink background denotes a candidate elected from their party list. Yellow background denotes an electorate win by a list member, or other incumbent. A ✓ or ✗ denotes status of any incumbent, win or lose respectively.						
Party	Candidate	Votes	%	±%	Party votes	%	±%
CDU	Sandra Carstensen	46,370	32.7	▲4.8	40,815	28.6	▲5.8
SPD	✗ Kristian Klinck	33,977	24.0	▼7.5	27,342	19.2	▼10.0
AfD	Andreas Preuß	25,249	17.8	▲10.7	25,683	18.0	▲10.7
Greens	Juliane Michel-Weirchenthal	18,852	13.3	▼2.4	19,957	14.0	▼3.4
Left	Lennart Niemeyer	7,623	5.4	▲2.6	9,657	6.8	▲3.6
FDP	Christian Zidorn	4,693	3.3	▼6.1	6,150	4.3	▼7.7
BSW					5,042	3.5	New
SSW					4,530	3.2	▲0.8
FW	Thomas Balster	3,022	2.1	▲0.3	1,147	0.8	▼0.2
Volt	Simon Wadehn	1,927	1.4	New	1,123	0.8	▲0.6
PARTEI					992	0.7	▼0.3
BD					177	0.1	New
MLPD					40	<0.1	0.0
Informal votes		1,892			950		
Total valid votes		141,713			142,655		
Turnout		143,605	82.7	▲6.2			
CDU gain from SPD	Majority	12,393	8.7	N/A			

=== 2021 election ===
Federal election (2021): Plön – Neumünster
Notes:	Blue background denotes the winner of the electorate vote. Pink background denotes a candidate elected from their party list. Yellow background denotes an electorate win by a list member, or other incumbent. A ✓ or ✗ denotes status of any incumbent, win or lose respectively.						
Party	Candidate	Votes	%	±%	Party votes	%	±%
SPD	Kristian Klinck	41,497	31.4	▲2.5	38,670	29.2	▲5.4
CDU	✗ Melanie Bernstein	36,870	27.9	▼12.8	30,290	22.9	▼10.7
Greens	Martin Drees	20,740	15.7	▲6.7	23,051	17.4	▲4.9
FDP	Gunnar Schulz	12,420	9.4	▲2.2	15,901	12.0	▼0.6
AfD	Alexis Giersch	9,404	7.1	▼0.7	9,741	7.4	▼1.2
Left	Gabi Gschwind-Wiese	3,718	2.8	▼2.6	4,232	3.2	▼3.3
SSW					3,203	2.4	
dieBasis	Karina Reiß	2,508	1.9		2,007	1.5	
Tierschutzpartei					1,446	1.1	
PARTEI	Jana Käding	2,196	1.7		1,300	1.0	0.0
FW	Manfred Koch	2,386	1.8	▲0.8	1,275	1.0	▲0.4
Team Todenhöfer					415	0.3	
NPD					242	0.2	▼0.2
Volt					230	0.2	
Humanists					111	0.1	
V-Partei3					98	0.1	
ÖDP					94	0.1	▼0.1
LKR	Jürgen Joost	223	0.2		94	0.1	
du.					70	0.1	
DKP					34	0.0	
MLPD					23	0.0	0.0
Informal votes		1,759			1,194		
Total valid votes		131,962			132,527		
Turnout		133,721	76.5	▲1.2			
SPD gain from CDU	Majority	4,627	3.5				

=== 2017 election ===
Federal election (2017): Plön – Neumünster
Notes:	Blue background denotes the winner of the electorate vote. Pink background denotes a candidate elected from their party list. Yellow background denotes an electorate win by a list member, or other incumbent. A ✓ or ✗ denotes status of any incumbent, win or lose respectively.						
Party	Candidate	Votes	%	±%	Party votes	%	±%
CDU	Melanie Bernstein	53,109	40.7	▼3.0	43,778	33.5	▼5.2
SPD	Birgit Malecha-Nissen	37,728	28.9	▼8.6	31,013	23.8	▼9.0
Greens	Susanne Elbert	11,736	9.0	▲2.6	16,350	12.5	▲3.3
AfD	Bernd Wiegmann	10,223	7.8	▲4.0	11,161	8.6	▲3.9
FDP	Martin Wolf	9,379	7.2	▲5.3	16,481	12.6	▲7.3
Left	Lorenz Gösta Beutin	7,009	5.4	▲1.6	8,503	6.5	▲1.7
PARTEI					1,342	1.0	
FW	Holger Steffen	1,305	1.0		749	0.6	0.0
BGE					632	0.4	
NPD					479	0.4	▼0.6
ÖDP					186	0.1	
MLPD					61	0.0	0.0
Informal votes		1,224			1,199		
Total valid votes		130,489			130,514		
Turnout		131,713	75.3	▲2.6			
CDU hold	Majority	15,381	11.8	▲5.6			

=== 2013 election ===
Federal election (2013): Plön – Neumünster
Notes:	Blue background denotes the winner of the electorate vote. Pink background denotes a candidate elected from their party list. Yellow background denotes an electorate win by a list member, or other incumbent. A ✓ or ✗ denotes status of any incumbent, win or lose respectively.						
Party	Candidate	Votes	%	±%	Party votes	%	±%
CDU	✓ Philipp Murmann	54,833	43.7	▲5.1	48,683	38.8	▲6.7
SPD	Birgit Malecha-Nissen	47,085	37.5	▲4.1	41,094	32.7	▲4.3
Greens	Bernhard Dierdorf	7,979	6.4	▼3.4	11,577	9.2	▼3.3
AfD	Arne Stanneck	4,837	3.9		5,901	4.7	
Left	Lorenz Gösta Beutin	4,708	3.8	▼2.6	5,987	4.8	▼2.4
FDP	Martin Wolf	2,322	1.9	▼8.2	6,722	5.4	▼10.5
Pirates	Peter Matthiesen	2,167	1.7		2,154	1.7	▼0.1
NPD	Daniel Nordhorn	1,162	0.9	▼0.2	1,159	0.9	▼0.1
Tierschutzpartei					1,004	0.8	
FW					711	0.6	
Rentner					535	0.4	▼0.5
Independent	Frank Schepke	319	0.3	▼0.4			
MLPD					46	0.0	0.0
Informal votes		1,681			1,520		
Total valid votes		125,412			125,573		
Turnout		127,093	72.7	▼0.3			
CDU hold	Majority	7,748	6.2	▲1.0			

=== 2009 election ===
Federal election (2009): Plön – Neumünster
Notes:	Blue background denotes the winner of the electorate vote. Pink background denotes a candidate elected from their party list. Yellow background denotes an electorate win by a list member, or other incumbent. A ✓ or ✗ denotes status of any incumbent, win or lose respectively.						
Party	Candidate	Votes	%	±%	Party votes	%	±%
CDU	Philipp Murmann	48,136	38.6	▼3.9	30,110	32.1	▼4.2
SPD	Birgit Malecha-Nissen	41,683	33.4	▼13.6	35,557	28.5	▼11.0
FDP	Martin Wolf	12,515	10.0	▲6.5	19,772	15.8	▲6.2
Greens	Sebastian Fricke	12,187	9.8	▲5.9	15,701	12.6	▲4.9
Left	Esther Hartmann	7,871	6.3		8,936	7.2	▲2.7
Pirates					2,281	1.8	
NPD	Jens Lütke	1,363	1.1	▼0.2	1,315	1.1	▼0.1
Rentner					1,095	0.9	
Independent	Frank Schepke	924	0.7				
DVU					131	0.1	
MLPD					42	0.1	0.0
Informal votes		3,292			3,031		
Total valid votes		124,679			124,940		
Turnout		127,971	73.1	▼5.6			
CDU gain from SPD	Majority	6,453	5.2				

=== 2005 election ===
Federal election (2005): Plön – Neumünster
Notes:	Blue background denotes the winner of the electorate vote. Pink background denotes a candidate elected from their party list. Yellow background denotes an electorate win by a list member, or other incumbent. A ✓ or ✗ denotes status of any incumbent, win or lose respectively.						
Party	Candidate	Votes	%	±%	Party votes	%	±%
SPD	✓ Michael Bürsch	63,207	47.0	▼0.9	52,258	39.5	▼5.1
CDU	Helmut Lamp	57,110	42.5	▲3.7	48,910	36.3	▲0.5
Left					6,009	4.5	▲3.2
Greens	Sebastian Fricke	5,166	3.8	▼1.2	10,345	7.7	▼0.8
FDP	Martin Wolf	4,798	3.6	▼1.0	12,945	9.6	▲1.9
Familie	Sabine Cavic	2,341	1.7		1,778	1.3	
NPD	Jens Lütke	2,341	1.7		1,778	1.3	
MLPD					111	0.1	
Informal votes		2,560			2,100		
Total valid votes		134,422			134,882		
Turnout		136,982	78.7	▼1.7			
SPD hold	Majority	6,097	4.5				
