= Melanie Bernstein =

German politician (born 1976)

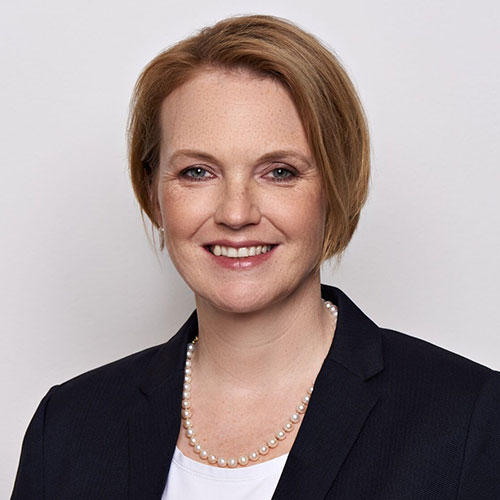
- Melanie Bernstein in 2019

Member of the Bundestag for Plön – Neumünster
- In office 24 September 2017 – 26 September 2021
- Preceded by: Philipp Murmann
- Succeeded by: Kristian Klinck

Member of the Bundestag for Schleswig-Holstein
- Incumbent
- Assumed office 6 February 2023
- Preceded by: Gero Storjohann

Personal details
- Born: 28 September 1976 (age 49) Buchholz in der Nordheide, West Germany (now Germany)
- Party: CDU

Melanie Bernstein (born 28 September 1976) is a German politician of the Christian Democratic Union (CDU) who served as a member of the Bundestag from the state of Schleswig-Holstein from 2017 to 2021, and again since 2023.

== Political career ==
Bernstein became a member of the Bundestag in the 2017 German federal election, elected in the constituency of Plön – Neumünster. She was a member of the Committee on Culture and Media and the Committee on Family, Senior Citizens, Women and Youth.

Bernstein lost her seat to Kristian Klinck from the Social Democratic Party at the 2021 German federal election. In January 2023, following the death of Gero Storjohann, Bernstein moved up the list and returned to the Bundestag. She has since been serving as a member of the Committee on Family, Senior Citizens, Women and Youth and the Committee on Petitions.

== Personal life ==
Bernstein is the widow of the CDU politician and member of the state parliament Axel Bernstein (1974–2017), who died in an accident in his garden a month before the 2017 federal election. She is a mother of twins and is an evangelical Christian.

== Other activities ==
- German Federal Film Board (FFA), Member of the Supervisory Board (since 2025)
- Deutsche Maritime Akademie, Member of the Advisory Board
- Max Planck Institute for Evolutionary Biology, Member of the Board of Trustees
