= Daniel Schneider (politician) =

German politician

Member of the Bundestag; for Cuxhaven – Stade II
- In office 26 October 2021 – 25 March 2025
- Preceded by: Enak Ferlemann
- Succeeded by: Christoph Frauenpreiß

Personal details
- Born: Daniel Dominik Schneider; 11 December 1976 (age 49) Cuxhaven, West Germany
- Party: Social Democratic
- Children: 2

Daniel Schneider (born 11 December 1976) is a German politician for the SPD and was from 2021 to March 2025 member of the Bundestag, the federal diet.

== Biography ==
Schneider was born 1976 in the West Germany city of Cuxhaven and studied economics. Schneider was directly elected to the Bundestag in 2021. In February 2025, Schneider lost his seat in Bundestag for district Cuxhaven – Stade II against Christoph Frauenpreiß.

== Official website ==
- Official website by Daniel Schneider
