= Lothar Riebsamen =

German politician

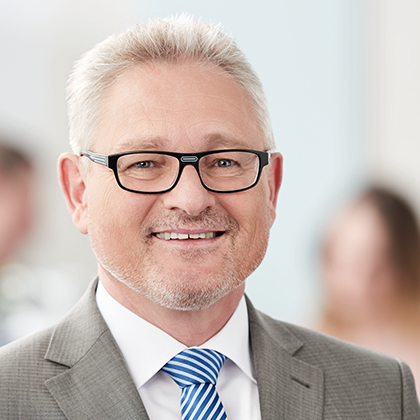
- Riebsamen in 2019

Member of the Bundestag; for Bodensee
- In office 27 October 2009 – 26 October 2021
- Preceded by: Constituency established
- Succeeded by: Volker Mayer-Lay

Personal details
- Born: 24 September 1957 (age 68) Pfullendorf, West Germany
- Party: Christian Democratic Union
- Children: 2

Lothar Riebsamen (born 24 September 1957) is a German politician of the Christian Democratic Union (CDU) who served as a member of the Bundestag from the state of Baden-Württemberg from 2009 until 2021.

== Political career ==
Riebsamen became a member of the Bundestag in the 2009 German federal election, representing the Bodensee district. In parliament, he was a member of the Health Committee. In this capacity, he served as his parliamentary group's rapporteur on hospitals.

In July 2020, Riebsamen announced that he would not stand in the 2021 federal elections but instead resign from active politics by the end of the parliamentary term.
