= Kristian Klinck =

German politician

Kristian Klinck MdB

Member of the Bundestag from Plön – Neumünster
- In office 26 October 2021 – 2025
- Preceded by: Melanie Bernstein
- Succeeded by: Sandra Carstensen

Personal details
- Born: 19 April 1979 (age 47) Kiel, Germany
- Party: SPD
- Occupation: teacher

Kristian Klinck (born 19 April 1979) is a German teacher and politician of the Social Democratic Party (SPD) who was the member of the Bundestag for Plön – Neumünster since the 2021 German federal election.

== Political career ==
Klinck became a member of the Bundestag in 2021. He unseated Melanie Bernstein from the Christian Democratic Union in Plön – Neumünster.

In parliament, Klinck served on the Defence Committee. In addition to his committee assignments, he was part of the German delegation to the Parliamentary Assembly of the Organization for Security and Co-operation in Europe since 2022.

Within his parliamentary group, Klinck belonged to the Parliamentary Left, a left-wing movement.

== Other activities ==
- Education and Science Workers' Union (GEW), Member

== Election results ==
Federal election (2021): Plön – Neumünster
Notes:	Blue background denotes the winner of the electorate vote. Pink background denotes a candidate elected from their party list. Yellow background denotes an electorate win by a list member, or other incumbent. A ✓ or ✗ denotes status of any incumbent, win or lose respectively.						
Party	Candidate	Votes	%	±%	Party votes	%	±%
CDU	✗ Melanie Bernstein	36,869	27.9	▼12.8	30,290	22.9	▼10.7
SPD	Kristian Klinck	41,498	31.4	▲2.5	38,672	29.2	▲5.4
Greens	Martin Drees	20,739	15.7	▲6.7	23,052	17.4	▲4.9
AfD	Alexis Giersch	9,404	7.1	▼0.7	9,741	7.4	▼1.2
FDP	Gunnar Schulz	12,420	9.4	▲2.2	15,902	12.0	▼0.6
Left	Gabi Gschwind-Wiese	3,718	2.8	▼2.6	4,233	3.2	▼3.3
PARTEI	Jana Käding	2.196	1.7		1,300	1.0	0.0
FW	Manfred Koch	2,386	1.8	▲0.8	1,275	1.0	▲0.4
NPD					242	0.2	▼0.2
ÖDP					94	0.1	▼0.1
MLPD					23	0.0	0.0
dieBasis	Prof. Karina Reiß	2,508	1.9		2,007	1.5	
DKP					34	0.0	
du.					70	0.1	
LKR	Jürgen Joost	223	0.2		93	0.1	
PDV					111	0.1	
Tierschutzpartei					1,446	1.1	
SSW					3,201	2.4	
Team Todenhöfer					415	0.3	
Volt					230	0.2	
V-Partei³					98	0.1	
Informal votes		1,766			1,198		
Total valid votes		131,961			132,529		
Turnout		133,727	76.5	▲1.2			
SPD gain from CDU	Majority	4,629	3.5				
