= Ewald Schurer =

German politician (1954–2017)

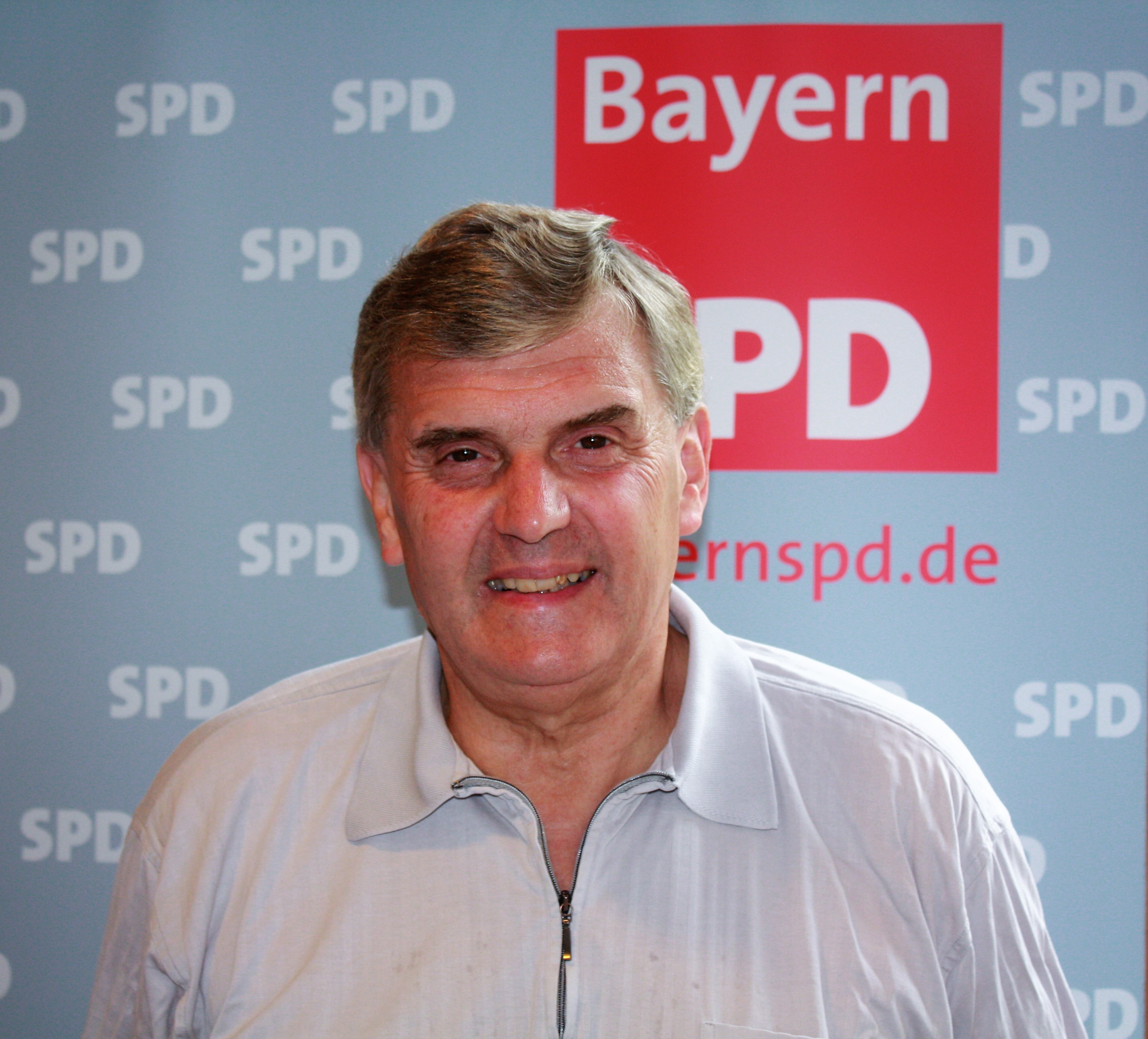
Schurer in August 2017

Ewald Schurer (15 April 1954 – 2 December 2017) was a German politician for the Social Democratic Party (SPD). At the time of death, he had been serving in the Bundestag since 2005. He had previously served in the Bundestag from 1998 to 2002. He was elected to the local council of Ebersberg, Bavaria in 1984. A Roman Catholic, Schurer was married with four children.

He ran unsuccessfully in Erding – Ebersberg in 2009, 2013 and 2017.

Schurer died on 2 December 2017 at his home in Ebersberg, at the age of 63.
