= Bodensee (electoral district) =

Federal electoral district of Germany

293 Bodensee
- Electoral district for the Bundestag
- Bodensee in 2025
- State: Baden-Württemberg
- Population: 239,100 (2019)
- Electorate: 174,430 (2021)
- Major settlements: Friedrichshafen; Überlingen; Tettnang
- Area: 860.6 km^{2}

Current electoral district
- Created: 2009
- Party: CDU
- Member: Volker Mayer-Lay
- Elected: 2021, 2025

Bodensee is an electoral constituency (German: Wahlkreis) represented in the Bundestag. It elects one member via first-past-the-post voting. Under the current constituency numbering system, it is designated as constituency 293. It is located in southeastern Baden-Württemberg, comprising the Bodenseekreis district and southern parts of the Sigmaringen district.

Bodensee was created for the 2009 federal election. Since 2021, it has been represented by Volker Mayer-Lay of the Christian Democratic Union (CDU).

== Geography ==
Bodensee is located in southeastern Baden-Württemberg. As of the 2021 federal election, it comprises the district of Bodensee and the municipalities of Herdwangen-Schönach, Illmensee, Pfullendorf, and Wald from the Sigmaringen district.

== History ==
Bodensee was created in 2009 and contained parts of the abolished constituency of Ravensburg – Bodensee and the redistributed constituency of Zollernalb – Sigmaringen. Its constituency number and borders have not changed since its creation.

== Members ==
The constituency was first represented by Lothar Riebsamen of the Christian Democratic Union (CDU) from 2009 to 2021. He was succeeded by Volker Mayer-Lay in 2021.

Election	Member	Party	%
2009	Lothar Riebsamen	CDU	45.0
2013	Lothar Riebsamen	CDU	53.9
2017	Lothar Riebsamen	CDU	41.4
2021	Volker Mayer-Lay	CDU	30.4
2025	Volker Mayer-Lay	CDU	40.0

== Election results ==
=== 2025 election ===
Federal election (2025): Bodensee
Notes:	Blue background denotes the winner of the electorate vote. Pink background denotes a candidate elected from their party list. Yellow background denotes an electorate win by a list member, or other incumbent. A ✓ or ✗ denotes status of any incumbent, win or lose respectively.						
Party	Candidate	Votes	%	±%	Party votes	%	±%
CDU	Volker Mayer-Lay	57,654	40.0	▲9.6	50,583	35.0	▲8.3
AfD	Alice Weidel	29,316	20.4	▲11.2	27,287	18.9	▲10.2
SPD	Leon Hahn	21,966	15.3	▼5.6	18,778	13.0	▼6.7
Greens	Ahmad Al Hamidi	18,268	12.7	▼4.4	19,560	13.6	▼3.7
Left	Peter Reich	6.089	4.2	▲1.5	8,004	5.5	▲2.7
BSW					5,847	4.1	
FDP	Akif Akyildiz	4,629	3.2	▼9.0	8,286	5.7	▼10.1
FW	Thomas Schalski	3,534	2.5	▲0.2	2,020	1.4	▲0.4
Volt	Simon Oberdörffer	2,332	1.6		1,117	0.8	▲0.4
Tierschutzpartei					1,053	0.7	▼0.3
PARTEI				▼	585	0.4	▼0.6
dieBasis				▼3.0	507	0.4	▼2.5
ÖDP				▼0.7	313	0.2	▼0.2
Bündnis C					209	0.1	0.0
BD					153	0.1	
MLPD	Ursula Renner	231	0.2		50	0.0	0.0
Team Todenhöfer							▼0.4
Pirates							▼0.4
Gesundheitsforschung							▼0.1
Humanists							▼0.1
Informal votes		1,102			770		
Total valid votes		144,020			144,352		
Turnout		145,122	83.7	▲4.7			
CDU hold	Majority	28,338	19.6	▼1.6			

=== 2021 election ===
Federal election (2021): Bodensee
Notes:	Blue background denotes the winner of the electorate vote. Pink background denotes a candidate elected from their party list. Yellow background denotes an electorate win by a list member, or other incumbent. A ✓ or ✗ denotes status of any incumbent, win or lose respectively.						
Party	Candidate	Votes	%	±%	Party votes	%	±%
CDU	Volker Mayer-Lay	41,624	30.4	▼10.9	36,571	26.7	▼10.4
SPD	Leon Hahn	28,501	20.8	▲2.8	26,989	19.7	▲5.5
Greens	Maria Heubuch	23,385	17.1	▲3.2	23,635	17.3	▲2.5
FDP	Christian Steffen-Stiehl	16,751	12.2	▲3.4	21,611	15.8	▲2.6
AfD	Alice Weidel	12,584	9.2	▼1.2	11,916	8.7	▼1.7
dieBasis	Johanna Findeisen-Juskowiak	4,045	3.0		3,862	2.8	
Left	Sander Frank	3,705	2.7	▼2.6	3,905	2.9	▼3.3
FW	Thomas Brillisauer	3,047	2.2	▲1.2	2,526	1.8	▲1.1
Tierschutzpartei					1,433	1.0	▲0.4
PARTEI	Dominik Steuer	2,079	1.5		1,345	1.0	▲0.4
Team Todenhöfer					563	0.4	
ÖDP	Annedore Schmid	931	0.7	▼0.4	555	0.4	▼0.1
Pirates					490	0.4	0.0
Volt					458	0.3	
Bündnis C					202	0.1	
Bürgerbewegung					158	0.1	
DiB					133	0.1	▼0.1
Gesundheitsforschung					125	0.1	
Humanists					117	0.1	
Independent	Franziska Schmidt	103	0.1				
NPD					94	0.1	▼0.1
Bündnis 21					52	0.0	
LKR					49	0.0	
DKP					32	0.0	0.0
MLPD					27	0.0	0.0
Informal votes		1,083			990		
Total valid votes		136,755			136,848		
Turnout		137,838	79.0	▼0.4			
CDU hold	Majority	13,123	9.6	▼13.7			

=== 2017 election ===
Federal election (2017): Bodensee
Notes:	Blue background denotes the winner of the electorate vote. Pink background denotes a candidate elected from their party list. Yellow background denotes an electorate win by a list member, or other incumbent. A ✓ or ✗ denotes status of any incumbent, win or lose respectively.						
Party	Candidate	Votes	%	±%	Party votes	%	±%
CDU	✓ Lothar Riebsamen	56,165	41.4	▼12.5	50,428	37.1	▼11.6
SPD	Leon Hahn	24,451	18.0	▼2.6	19,321	14.2	▼4.0
Greens	Markus Böhlen	18,811	13.9	▲2.6	20,015	14.7	▲3.0
AfD	Alice Weidel	14,079	10.4		14,164	10.4	▲5.9
FDP	Christian Steffen-Stiehl	11,999	8.8	▲4.9	17,954	13.2	▲6.8
Left	Claudia Haydt	7,185	5.3	▲0.8	8,316	6.1	▲1.7
ÖDP	Sylvia Hiß-Petrowitz	1,412	1.0	▼0.1	726	0.5	▼0.2
FW	Antonio Falla	1,338	1.0	▼0.3	1,001	0.7	▲0.1
Tierschutzpartei					919	0.7	▼0.1
PARTEI					794	0.6	
Pirates					462	0.3	▼1.7
BGE					286	0.2	
DM					278	0.2	
NPD					265	0.2	▼0.7
Tierschutzallianz					260	0.2	
Menschliche Welt					239	0.2	
Independent	Martin Rosenacker	230	0.2				
DiB					208	0.2	
V-Partei³					199	0.1	
Independent	Elfriede Schuler	124	0.1				
MLPD					58	0.0	0.0
DIE RECHTE					42	0.0	
DKP					16	0.0	
Informal votes		1,352			1,195		
Total valid votes		135,794			134,951		
Turnout		137,146	79.4	▲4.1			
CDU hold	Majority	31,714	23.4	▼9.9			

=== 2013 election ===
Federal election (2013): Bodensee
Notes:	Blue background denotes the winner of the electorate vote. Pink background denotes a candidate elected from their party list. Yellow background denotes an electorate win by a list member, or other incumbent. A ✓ or ✗ denotes status of any incumbent, win or lose respectively.						
Party	Candidate	Votes	%	±%	Party votes	%	±%
CDU	✓ Lothar Riebsamen	68,333	53.9	▲8.9	61,961	48.7	▲12.1
SPD	Jochen Jehle	26,105	20.6	▲1.0	23,125	18.2	▲1.6
Greens	Alexander Gaus	14,224	11.2	▼3.2	14,955	11.8	▼2.3
Left	Annette Groth	5,749	4.5	▼1.3	5,629	4.4	▼2.0
FDP	Hans-Peter Wetzel	4,955	3.9	▼9.8	8,086	6.4	▼13.9
AfD					5,689	4.5	
Pirates	Carsten Göpfert	2,825	2.2		2,594	2.0	0.0
NPD	Tim Belz	1,594	1.3	▼0.2	1,091	0.9	▼0.2
FW	Helmut Wolfer	1,566	1.2		863	0.7	
ÖDP	Franz Weber	1,415	1.1		902	0.7	▲0.1
Tierschutzpartei					950	0.7	▲0.1
Volksabstimmung					362	0.3	0.0
REP					303	0.2	▼0.3
RENTNER					254	0.2	
PBC					163	0.1	▼0.2
Party of Reason					98	0.1	
PRO					75	0.1	
MLPD					51	0.0	0.0
BIG					37	0.0	
BüSo					21	0.0	0.0
Informal votes		1,930			1,487		
Total valid votes		126,766			127,209		
Turnout		128,696	75.3	▲2.2			
CDU hold	Majority	42,228	33.3	▲7.9			

=== 2009 election ===
Federal election (2009): Bodensee
Notes:	Blue background denotes the winner of the electorate vote. Pink background denotes a candidate elected from their party list. Yellow background denotes an electorate win by a list member, or other incumbent. A ✓ or ✗ denotes status of any incumbent, win or lose respectively.						
Party	Candidate	Votes	%	±%	Party votes	%	±%
CDU	Lothar Riebsamen	54,169	45.0	▼4.7	44,205	36.6	▼5.3
SPD	Jochen Jehle	23,587	19.6	▼9.3	20,080	16.6	▼11.0
Greens	Petra Selg	17,349	14.4	▼3.4	16,962	14.0	▲2.7
FDP	Alexander Reuter	16,521	13.7	▲8.3	24,483	20.3	▲7.9
Left	Detlef Schönig	7,077	5.9	▲3.1	7,775	6.4	▲3.2
Pirates					2,441	2.0	
NPD	Roland Müller	1,771	1.5	▲0.1	1,277	1.1	▲0.1
Tierschutzpartei					813	0.7	
ÖDP					705	0.6	
REP					628	0.5	▼0.2
DIE VIOLETTEN					444	0.4	
Volksabstimmung					402	0.3	
PBC					344	0.3	▼0.2
ADM					148	0.1	
DVU					67	0.1	
BüSo					57	0.0	0.0
MLPD					57	0.0	0.0
Informal votes		2,181			1,767		
Total valid votes		120,474			120,888		
Turnout		122,655	73.1	▼6.4			
CDU win new seat	Majority	30,582	25.4				
