= Axel Bernstein =

German politician (1974–2017)

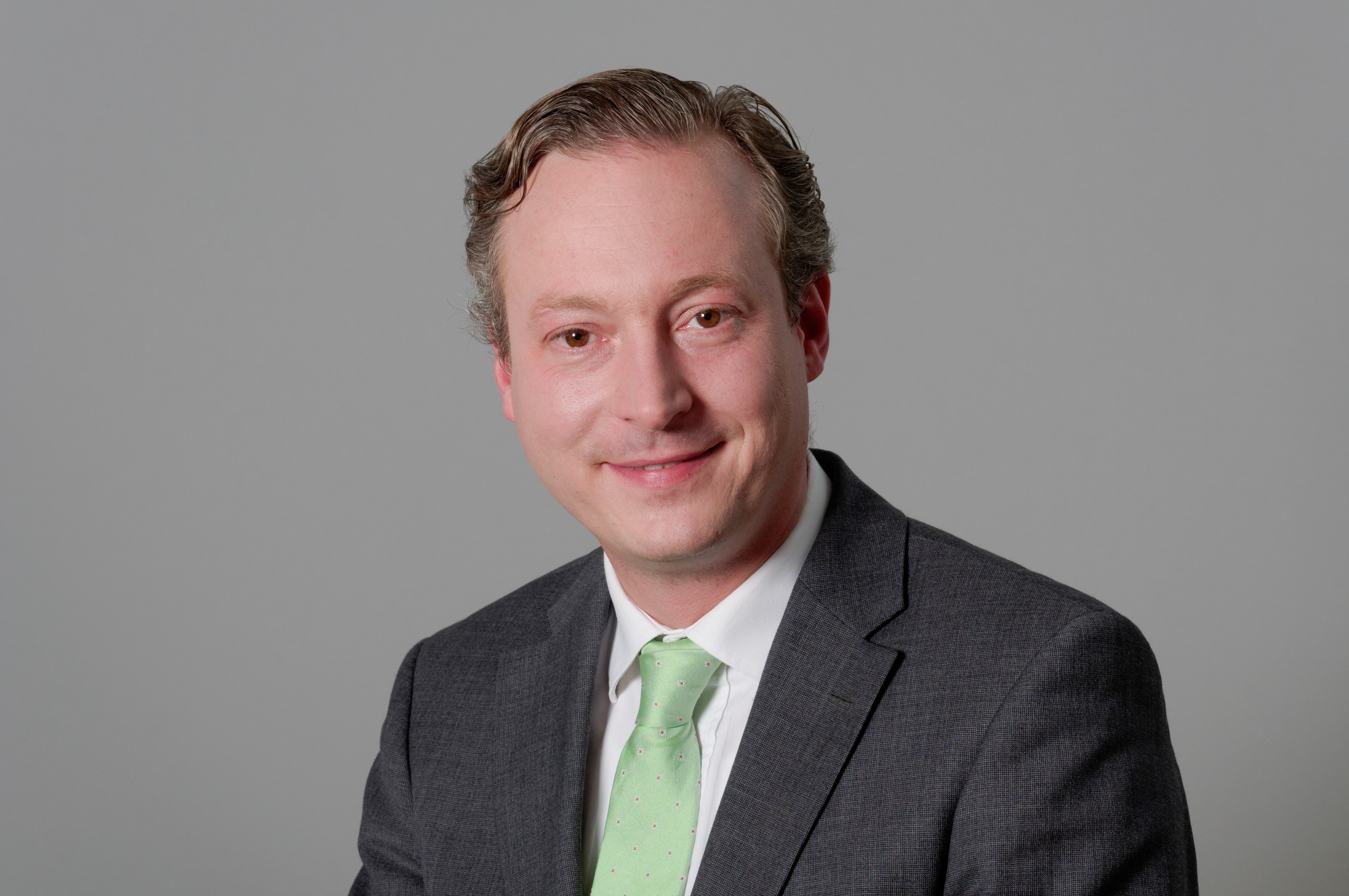
- Bernstein in 2013.

Member of the Landtag of Schleswig-Holstein
- In office 20 February 2005 – 24 August 2017

Personal details
- Born: 27 July 1974 Neumünster, Schleswig-Holstein
- Died: 24 August 2017 (aged 43) Wahlstedt, Schleswig-Holstein
- Party: CDU
- Spouse: Melanie Bernstein (wife)
- Education: Kiel University

Axel Bernstein (27 July 1974 – 24 August 2017) was a German politician from the Christian Democratic Union. From 2005 until his death he was a member of the Landtag of Schleswig-Holstein.

== Life and career ==
After graduating from the Dahlmannschule in Bad Segeberg in 1994, Bernstein first served as a military service officer and later worked as a reserve officer in the Bundeswehr. In 1996 he began studying medieval and modern history, political science and public law at the Christian-Albrechts-University in Kiel, which he completed in 2002 with a Magister Artium. He then worked as a press and public relations officer at the CDU state association in Schleswig-Holsteinactive and acted as office manager of the CDU state chairman. From 2005 to 2010, Bernstein was editor-in-chief of the Schleswig-Holstein-Kurier and completed his doctorate in 2009 . From 2002 he worked independently in the field of political communication consulting and management consulting.

Bernstein was an Evangelical Lutheran. On 24 August 2017, Bernstein was found lifeless on his property in Wahlstedt after a fall, the doctor could only determine his death. He was 43 years old. He was married to fellow CDU politician Melanie Bernstein and had two children.

== Political career ==
While still at school, Bernstein became a member of the Young Union in 1992 and was local chairman of the Young Union Wahlstedt from the year he joined until 1996. In 1993 he also joined the CDU and since then has been a civil member of the CDU parliamentary group in Wahlstedt. From 1994 to 2002 he was on the district board of the Young Union Segeberg, from 1997 as district chairman. He was first elected to the district executive of the CDU Segeberg in 1995 and has served as its deputy district chairman since 2001. From 1998 to 2008 he was a member of the district council. In 2001, Bernstein was elected deputy state chairman of the Young Union Schleswig-Holstein and held this position until 2005. From 2003 to 2008 he was deputy chairman of the CDU district parliamentary group and from 2005 chairman of the CDU in Wahlstedt.

On 6 November 2015, the CDU state board of Schleswig-Holstein elected him state manager at the suggestion of state chairman Ingbert Liebing. He held this position from 9 November 2015 to 31 October 2016.

== Legislative career ==
From 2005 to 2009 he was environmental policy spokesman for the CDU parliamentary group and in his function as chairman of the parliamentary group working group on the environment he was a member of the parliamentary group executive committee. After being re-elected in the 2009 Schleswig-Holstein state election, he was Parliamentary Secretary. From 2012 he was media policy spokesman for the CDU parliamentary group and a member of the interior and legal committee, from 2014 chairman of the parliamentary group working group on interior and law and police spokesman for his parliamentary group.

Bernstein was elected as member of the Landtag of Schleswig-Holstein in the 2005 Schleswig-Holstein state election with 49.8 percent of the first votes as a directly elected member for the Segeberg-East constituency. In the early state elections in Schleswig-Holstein in 2009, was re-elected with 41.0 percent of the first votes, as well as in 2012. In the 2017 state elections, he (with 43.1 percent of the first votes) was again given the direct mandate of his constituency for the 19th electoral term, but due to his death, Lübeck CDU district chairwoman Anette Röttger moved into the state parliament just a few months later.

== Publications ==
- Die Gebietsreform in Schleswig-Holstein. Die Neugliederung der Kreise in den 1960er und 1970er Jahren (= IZRG-Schriftenreihe. Band 14). Verlag für Regionalgeschichte, Gütersloh 2010, ISBN 978-3-89534-754-2.

== Social engagement ==
From 2004 Bernstein was a member of the Economic Advisory Board of the Lübeck Chamber of Industry and Commerce (IHK). From 2007 to 2016 he was deputy chairman of the association for youth and cultural work.

He was also engaged as:

- Supporting member of the Wahlstedt volunteer fire department and the Bad Segeberg volunteer fire department
- Member of the Segeberger Tafel
- Member of the local history association of the district of Segeberg
- Member of the Society for Schleswig-Holstein History
- Member of the Friends of the Air Force Museum of the German Armed Forces
- Member of the Association for the Promotion of the Invalidenfriedhof
- Member of the Lions Club Wahlstedt
