= Cuxhaven – Stade II =

Federal electoral district of Germany

29 Cuxhaven – Stade II
- Electoral district for the Bundestag
- Cuxhaven – Stade II in 2025
- State: Lower Saxony
- Population: 234,900 (2019)
- Electorate: 188,602 (2021)
- Major settlements: Cuxhaven; Geestland
- Area: 2,575.3 km^{2}

Current electoral district
- Created: 2009
- Party: CDU
- Member: Christoph Frauenpreiß
- Elected: 2025

Cuxhaven – Stade II is an electoral constituency (German: Wahlkreis) represented in the Bundestag. It elects one member via first-past-the-post voting. Under the current constituency numbering system, it is designated as constituency 29. It is located in northern Lower Saxony, comprising the Cuxhaven district and the northern part of the Stade district.

Cuxhaven – Stade II was created for the 2009 federal election. Since 2025, it has been represented by Christoph Frauenpreiß from the Christian Democratic Union of Germany (CDU). It was previously held by Daniel Schneider of the Social Democratic Party (SPD).

== Geography ==
Cuxhaven – Stade II is located in northern Lower Saxony. As of the 2021 federal election, it comprises the entirety of the district of Cuxhaven and the northern part of the district of Stade, specifically the municipality of Drochtersen and the Samtgemeinden of Nordkehdingen and Oldendorf-Himmelpforten.

== History ==
Cuxhaven – Stade II was created in 2009 and contained parts of the abolished constituencies of Cuxhaven – Osterholz and Stade – Cuxhaven. In the 2009 election, it was constituency 30 in the numbering system. Since the 2013 election, it has been constituency 29. Its borders have not changed since its creation.

== Members ==
The constituency was first held by Enak Ferlemann of the Christian Democratic Union (CDU) from 2009 to 2021. Daniel Schneider won it for the Social Democratic Party (SPD) in 2021.

Election	Member	Party	%
2009	Enak Ferlemann	CDU	38.6
2013	Enak Ferlemann	CDU	46.8
2017	Enak Ferlemann	CDU	42.7
2021	Daniel Schneider	SPD	36.8
2025	Christoph Frauenpreiß	CDU	32.7

== Election results ==
=== 2025 election ===
Federal election (2025): Cuxhaven – Stade II
Notes:	Blue background denotes the winner of the electorate vote. Pink background denotes a candidate elected from their party list. Yellow background denotes an electorate win by a list member, or other incumbent. A ✓ or ✗ denotes status of any incumbent, win or lose respectively.						
Party	Candidate	Votes	%	±%	Party votes	%	±%
CDU	Christoph Frauenpreiß	50,395	32.7	▲2.6	45,964	29.8	▲3.6
SPD	✗ Daniel Schneider	46,915	30.5	▼6.4	37,040	24.0	▼11.0
AfD	Sebastian Sieg	30,472	19.8	▲12.5	30,933	20.0	▲12.2
Greens	Christopher Jesse	11,030	7.2	▼3.9	13,656	8.8	▼3.7
Left	Hilke Hochheiden	7,968	5.2	▲3.2	9,280	6.0	▲3.4
FDP	Günter Wichert	4,166	2.7	▼4.2	5,823	3.8	▼6.3
BSW					5,729	3.7	
Tierschutzpartei					2,095	1.4	▼0.4
FW	Rüdiger Kurmann	3,087	2.0	▲0.5	1,232	0.8	▼0.3
Volt					967	0.6	▲0.5
PARTEI					635	0.4	▼0.4
dieBasis					530	0.3	▼0.7
Pirates					225	0.1	▼0.2
BD					190	0.1	
Humanists					65	0.0	0.0
MLPD					24	0.0	0.0
Informal votes		1,143			788		
Total valid votes		154,033			154,388		
Turnout		155,176	82.9	▲8.3			
CDU gain from SPD	Majority	3,480	2.2				

=== 2021 election ===
Federal election (2021): Cuxhaven – Stade II
Notes:	Blue background denotes the winner of the electorate vote. Pink background denotes a candidate elected from their party list. Yellow background denotes an electorate win by a list member, or other incumbent. A ✓ or ✗ denotes status of any incumbent, win or lose respectively.						
Party	Candidate	Votes	%	±%	Party votes	%	±%
SPD	Daniel Schneider	51,417	36.8	▲6.1	48,858	35.0	▲7.3
CDU	✗ Enak Ferlemann	42,085	30.1	▼12.6	36,586	26.2	▼12.3
Greens	Stefan Wenzel	15,389	11.0	▲5.0	17,553	12.6	▲5.7
AfD	Hans Olaf Kappelt	10,227	7.3	▼1.1	11,000	7.9	▼1.1
FDP	Günter Wichert	9,622	6.9	▲1.9	14,052	10.1	▲1.9
Tierschutzpartei	Susanne Berghoff	2,954	2.1		2,405	1.7	▲0.8
Left	Dietmar Buttler	2,694	1.9	▼3.9	3,672	2.6	▼3.9
FW	Claudia Theis	2,102	1.5	▲0.2	1,535	1.1	▲0.5
PARTEI	Dirk Sieling	1,766	1.3		1,145	0.8	▲0.2
dieBasis	Peter Jens von der Geest	1,416	1.0		1,418	1.0	
Pirates					433	0.3	0.0
Team Todenhöfer					231	0.2	
Volt					225	0.2	
NPD					180	0.1	▼0.2
V-Partei3					100	0.1	0.0
Humanists					90	0.1	
ÖDP					87	0.1	0.0
du.					79	0.1	
LKR					31	0.0	
DKP					20	0.0	0.0
MLPD					16	0.0	0.0
Informal votes		1,067			1,023		
Total valid votes		139,672			139,716		
Turnout		140,739	74.6	▼0.9			
SPD gain from CDU	Majority	9,332	6.7				

=== 2017 election ===
Federal election (2017): Cuxhaven – Stade II
Notes:	Blue background denotes the winner of the electorate vote. Pink background denotes a candidate elected from their party list. Yellow background denotes an electorate win by a list member, or other incumbent. A ✓ or ✗ denotes status of any incumbent, win or lose respectively.						
Party	Candidate	Votes	%	±%	Party votes	%	±%
CDU	✓ Enak Ferlemann	59,930	42.7	▼4.0	54,163	38.5	▼5.4
SPD	Susanne Puvogel	43,077	30.7	▼5.7	38,923	27.7	▼5.8
AfD	Peter Würdig	11,862	8.5	▲5.5	12,650	9.0	▲5.5
Greens	Marcel Duda	8,491	6.1	▼0.1	9,709	6.9	▼0.2
Left	Nadije Memedi	8,121	5.8	▲2.2	9,121	6.5	▲1.9
FDP	Marco Rützel	6,984	5.0	▲3.6	11,483	8.2	▲4.5
FW	Lutz Mehrtens	1,828	1.3		907	0.6	▲0.2
Tierschutzpartei					1,338	1.0	▲0.2
PARTEI					890	0.6	
Pirates					410	0.3	▼1.2
NPD					396	0.3	▼0.7
DM					181	0.1	
BGE					163	0.1	
V-Partei³					133	0.1	
ÖDP					106	0.1	
DiB					100	0.1	
MLPD					26	0.0	0.0
DKP					20	0.0	
Informal votes		1,433			1,007		
Total valid votes		140,293			140,719		
Turnout		141,276	75.5	▲2.4			
CDU hold	Majority	16,853	12.0	▲1.6			

=== 2013 election ===
Federal election (2013): Cuxhaven – Stade II
Notes:	Blue background denotes the winner of the electorate vote. Pink background denotes a candidate elected from their party list. Yellow background denotes an electorate win by a list member, or other incumbent. A ✓ or ✗ denotes status of any incumbent, win or lose respectively.						
Party	Candidate	Votes	%	±%	Party votes	%	±%
CDU	✓ Enak Ferlemann	63,431	46.8	▲8.2	59,699	43.9	▲9.1
SPD	Gunnar Wegener	49,395	36.4	▼1.3	45,534	33.5	▲3.2
Greens	Eva Viehoff	8,326	6.1	▼0.1	9,592	7.1	▼1.8
Left	Guido Hagelstede	4,904	3.6	▼4.1	6,241	4.6	▼4.3
AfD	Bernhard Vogel	4,034	3.0		4,753	3.5	
FDP	Karl Behn	1,872	1.4	▼6.4	4,924	3.6	▼9.2
Pirates	Christian Braun	2,120	1.6		1,968	1.4	0.0
NPD	Andreas Haack	1,306	1.0	▼0.4	1,270	0.9	▼0.2
Tierschutzpartei					1,074	0.8	0.0
FW					586	0.4	
RRP	Gerald Lukas	273	0.2				
PRO					140	0.1	
PBC					101	0.1	
REP					43	0.0	
MLPD					42	0.0	0.0
Informal votes		1,490			1,184		
Total valid votes		135,661			135,967		
Turnout		137,151	73.1	▲1.3			
CDU hold	Majority	14,036	10.4	▲9.5			

=== 2009 election ===
Federal election (2009): Cuxhaven – Stade II
Notes:	Blue background denotes the winner of the electorate vote. Pink background denotes a candidate elected from their party list. Yellow background denotes an electorate win by a list member, or other incumbent. A ✓ or ✗ denotes status of any incumbent, win or lose respectively.						
Party	Candidate	Votes	%	±%	Party votes	%	±%
CDU	Enak Ferlemann	51,654	38.6	▼0.9	46,707	34.8	▲0.5
SPD	Thurid Küber	50,481	37.7	▼11.3	40,643	30.3	▼13.8
FDP	Frank Erkner	10,426	7.8	▲4.1	17,146	12.8	▲4.4
Left	Ulrich Schröder	10,307	7.7	▲4.9	11,920	8.9	▲4.5
Greens	Beate Adler	8,379	6.3	▲2.9	11,885	8.9	▲2.7
Pirates					1,938	1.4	
NPD	Helmut Walter	1,828	1.4	0.0	1,567	1.3	▼0.1
Tierschutzpartei					1,072	0.8	▲0.1
RRP					945	0.7	
Independent	Charlotte Didlap	847	0.6				
DVU					225	0.2	
ÖDP					173	0.1	
MLPD					28	0.0	0.0
Informal votes		1,902			1,575		
Total valid votes		133,922			134,249		
Turnout		135,824	71.8	▼6.5			
CDU win new seat	Majority	1,173	0.9				
