= Enak Ferlemann =

German politician (born 1963)

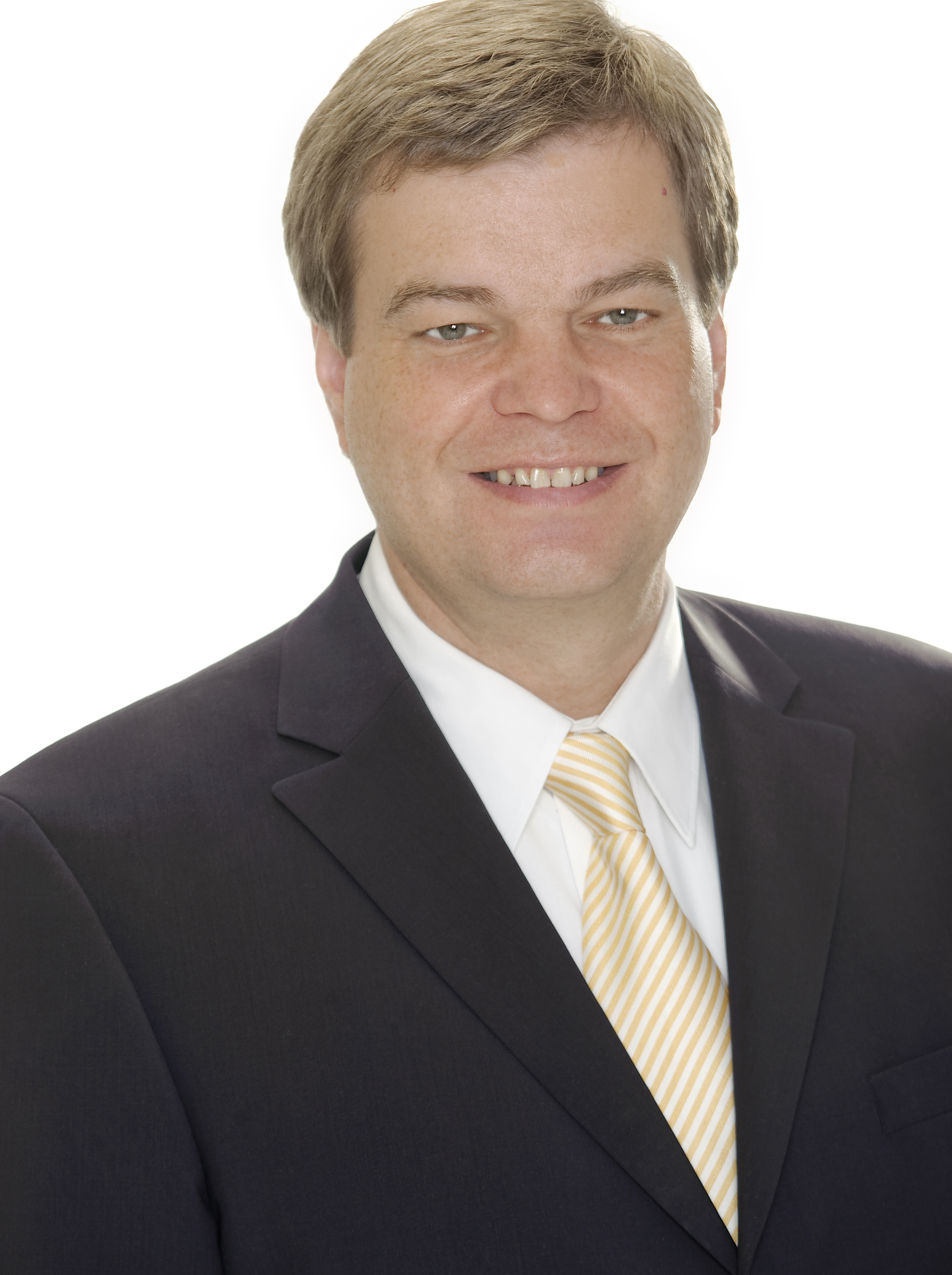
- Ferlemann in 2009

Parliamentary State Secretary for Transport and Digital Infrastructure
- In office 28 October 2009 – 8 December 2021
- Minister: Peter Ramsauer; Alexander Dobrindt; Christian Schmidt (acting); Andreas Scheuer
- Succeeded by: Michael Theurer

Member of the Bundestag; from Lower Saxony
- In office 17 October 2002 – 25 March 2025
- Constituency: State list (2002–2009); Cuxhaven – Stade II (2009–2021); State list (2021–2025)

Personal details
- Born: 12 July 1963 (age 63) Bad Rothenfelde, West Germany
- Party: Christian Democratic Union
- Children: 2

Enak Ferlemann (born 12 July 1963) is a German politician of the Christian Democratic Union (CDU) who has been serving as a member of the Bundestag since 2002.

== Early life and education ==
Ferlemann was born 1963 in the West German town of Bad Rothenfelde and studied jurisprudence without gaining a degree.

== Political career ==
Ferlemann entered the CDU in 1979 and became chairman of the county party organisation in Cuxhaven in 1995.

Ferlemann has been a member of the Bundestag since the 2002 elections, representing the Cuxhaven – Stade II constituency. In parliament, he served on the Committee on Transport, where he focused on the construction of Bundesautobahn 26 and the expansion of Bundesautobahn 20. From 2005 until 2009, he chaired the Sub-Committee on Railway Infrastructure.

In the negotiations to form a coalition government of the Christian Democrats and the FDP following the 2009 federal elections, Ferlemann was part of the CDU/CSU delegation in the working group on transport policy, led by Hans-Peter Friedrich and Patrick Döring.

Since the 2009 elections, Ferlemann has been serving as Parliamentary State Secretary in the Federal Ministry of Transport and Digital Infrastructure under the leadership of successive ministers Peter Ramsauer (2009-2013), Alexander Dobrindt (2013-2017) and Andreas Scheuer (since 2018) in the government of Chancellor Angela Merkel. In this capacity, he also served as the Federal Commissioner for Rail Transport from 2018 until 2021.

In the negotiations to form a coalition government under the leadership of Chancellor Angela Merkel following the 2017 federal elections, Ferlemann was part of the working group on transport and infrastructure, led by Michael Kretschmer, Alexander Dobrindt and Sören Bartol.

In June 2024, Ferlemann announced his decision not to seek re-election for parliament.

== Other activities ==
- DB InfraGO, Member of the Supervisory Board (since 2025)
