= Erding – Ebersberg =

Federal electoral district of Germany

212 Erding – Ebersberg
- Electoral district for the Bundestag
- Erding – Ebersberg in 2025
- State: Bavaria
- Population: 281,800 (2019)
- Electorate: 201,032 (2025)
- Major settlements: Erding; Dorfen; Grafing
- Area: 1,420.1 km^{2}

Current electoral district
- Created: 2005
- Party: CSU
- Member: Andreas Lenz
- Elected: 2013, 2017, 2021, 2025

Erding – Ebersberg is an electoral constituency (German: Wahlkreis) represented in the Bundestag. It elects one member via first-past-the-post voting. Under the current constituency numbering system, it is designated as constituency 212. It is located in southern Bavaria, comprising the districts of Erding and Ebersberg.

Erding – Ebersberg was created for the 2005 federal election. Since 2013, it has been represented by Andreas Lenz of the Christian Social Union (CSU).

== Geography ==
Erding – Ebersberg is located in southern Bavaria. As of the 2021 federal election, it comprises the districts of Erding and Ebersberg.

== History ==
The 2005 federal redistribution saw Bavaria allocated an additional constituency. Erding – Ebersberg was created from parts of the constituencies of Freising, Altötting, and München-Land. In the 2005 election, it was constituency 215 in the numbering system. In the 2009 and 2013 elections, it was number 214. In the 2017 and 2021 elections, it was number 213. From the 2025 election, it has been number 212. Its borders have not changed since its creation.

Election	No.	Name	Borders
2005	215	Erding – Ebersberg	Erding district; Ebersberg district
2009	214	Erding – Ebersberg	Erding district; Ebersberg district
2013	214	Erding – Ebersberg	Erding district; Ebersberg district
2017	213	Erding – Ebersberg	Erding district; Ebersberg district
2021	213	Erding – Ebersberg	Erding district; Ebersberg district
2025	212	Erding – Ebersberg	Erding district; Ebersberg district

== Members ==
The constituency was first represented by Maximilian Lehmer of the Christian Social Union (CSU) from 2005 to 2013. Andreas Lenz was elected in 2013, and re-elected in 2017, 2021, and 2025.

Election	Member	Party	%
2005	Maximilian Lehmer	CSU	58.4
2009	Maximilian Lehmer	CSU	48.9
2013	Andreas Lenz	CSU	55.4
2017	Andreas Lenz	CSU	48.2
2021	Andreas Lenz	CSU	42.3
2025	Andreas Lenz	CSU	45.9

== Election results ==
=== 2025 election ===
Federal election (2025): Erding – Ebersberg
Notes:	Blue background denotes the winner of the electorate vote. Pink background denotes a candidate elected from their party list. Yellow background denotes an electorate win by a list member, or other incumbent. A ✓ or ✗ denotes status of any incumbent, win or lose respectively.						
Party	Candidate	Votes	%	±%	Party votes	%	±%
CSU	✓ Andreas Lenz	80,087	45.9	▲3.7	70,010	40.1	▲6.7
AfD	Manuela Schulz	27,275	15.6	▲8.8	28,849	16.5	▲9.2
Greens	Christoph Lochmüller	23,383	13.4	▼1.5	22,730	13.0	▼1.7
SPD	Marco Mohr	17,609	10.1	▼4.4	17,630	10.1	▼5.2
Left	Tobias Boegelein	6,856	3.9	▲1.9	8,824	5.1	▲2.9
FDP	Martin Hagen	6,323	3.6	▼4.3	8,831	5.1	▼7.0
ÖDP	Wolfgang Reiter	2,472	1.4		1,023	0.6	▼0.2
Volt	Jakob Hetkämper	2,012	1.2		1,212	0.7	▲0.4
Independent	Bernhard Winter	1,367	0.8				
BP					375	0.2	▼0.6
dieBasis				▼1.8	600	0.3	▼1.4
Tierschutzpartei					1,418	0.8	▼0.3
Pirates							▼0.3
Team Todenhöfer							▼0.3
Humanists				{{{change}}}	129	0.1	0.0
MLPD					31	0.0	0.0
BSW					4,680	2.7	
Bündnis C							▼0.1
Team Todenhöfer							▼0.3
Informal votes		727			439		
Total valid votes		174,443			174,731		
Turnout		175,170	87.1	▲3.2			
CSU hold	Majority						

=== 2021 election ===
Federal election (2021): Erding – Ebersberg
Notes:	Blue background denotes the winner of the electorate vote. Pink background denotes a candidate elected from their party list. Yellow background denotes an electorate win by a list member, or other incumbent. A ✓ or ✗ denotes status of any incumbent, win or lose respectively.						
Party	Candidate	Votes	%	±%	Party votes	%	±%
CSU	✓ Andreas Lenz	70,656	42.3	▼5.9	55,992	33.4	▼5.7
Greens	Christoph Lochmüller	24,840	14.9	▲4.6	24,620	14.7	▲3.8
SPD	Magdalena Wagner	24,205	14.5	▼0.4	25,693	15.3	▲3.1
FDP	Marc Salih	13,226	7.9	▲0.6	20,228	12.1	▲0.1
FW	Birgit Obermaier	12,157	7.3		13,865	8.3	▲5.4
AfD	Peter Junker	11,448	6.8	▼3.4	12,228	7.3	▼4.6
Left	Tobias Boegelein	3,355	2.0	▼1.9	3,648	2.2	▼3.0
dieBasis	Alexandra Motschmann Sr.	2,958	1.8		2,827	1.7	
Tierschutzpartei					1,900	1.1	▲0.2
ÖDP	Charlotte Schmid	2,306	1.4	▼1.3	1,342	0.8	▼0.5
BP	Simone Binder	2,054	1.2	▼1.2	1,350	0.8	▼0.8
PARTEI					1,279	0.8	▲0.1
Pirates					534	0.3	▼0.1
Team Todenhöfer					481	0.3	
Volt					412	0.2	
Unabhängige					271	0.2	
Gesundheitsforschung					173	0.1	0.0
V-Partei3					161	0.1	▼0.1
Humanists					151	0.1	
du.					112	0.1	
Bündnis C					92	0.1	
NPD					82	0.0	▼0.1
The III. Path					59	0.0	
LKR					30	0.0	
MLPD					22	0.0	0.0
DKP					21	0.0	0.0
Informal votes		1,132			734		
Total valid votes		167,205			167,603		
Turnout		168,337	83.9	▲1.5			
CSU hold	Majority	45,816	27.4	▼5.9			

=== 2017 election ===
Federal election (2017): Erding – Ebersberg
Notes:	Blue background denotes the winner of the electorate vote. Pink background denotes a candidate elected from their party list. Yellow background denotes an electorate win by a list member, or other incumbent. A ✓ or ✗ denotes status of any incumbent, win or lose respectively.						
Party	Candidate	Votes	%	±%	Party votes	%	±%
CSU	✓ Andreas Lenz	78,212	48.2	▼7.2	63,525	39.1	▼12.0
SPD	Ewald Schurer	24,131	14.9	▼4.2	19,943	12.3	▼4.3
AfD	Brigitte Fischbacher	16,689	10.3	▲5.8	19,366	11.9	▲6.7
Greens	Anna-Maria Lanzinger	16,607	10.2	▲2.3	17,768	10.9	▲2.1
FDP	Peter Pernsteiner	11,889	7.3	▲5.1	19,407	11.9	▲6.8
Left	Lukas Schmid	6,418	4.0	▲1.4	8,352	5.1	▲2.2
FW					4,669	2.9	▼0.2
ÖDP	Christina Treffler	4,418	2.7	▲0.6	2,054	1.3	▼0.1
BP	Andreas Zimmer	3,884	2.4	▲0.4	2,644	1.6	▲0.1
Tierschutzpartei					1,552	1.0	▲0.2
PARTEI					1,146	0.7	
Pirates					621	0.4	▼1.4
DiB					298	0.2	
V-Partei³					286	0.2	
NPD					268	0.2	▼0.3
DM					260	0.2	
Gesundheitsforschung					197	0.1	
BGE					183	0.1	
BüSo					23	0.0	0.0
MLPD					21	0.0	0.0
DKP					19	0.0	
Informal votes		1,109			755		
Total valid votes		162,248			162,602		
Turnout		163,357	82.4	▲7.8			
CSU hold	Majority	54,081	33.3	▼3.0			

=== 2013 election ===
Federal election (2013): Erding – Ebersberg
Notes:	Blue background denotes the winner of the electorate vote. Pink background denotes a candidate elected from their party list. Yellow background denotes an electorate win by a list member, or other incumbent. A ✓ or ✗ denotes status of any incumbent, win or lose respectively.						
Party	Candidate	Votes	%	±%	Party votes	%	±%
CSU	Andreas Lenz	78,991	55.4	▲6.5	72,850	51.1	▲7.2
SPD	Ewald Schurer	27,233	19.1	▲1.4	23,670	16.6	▲2.9
Greens	Stefan Kisters	11,377	8.0	▼4.7	12,587	8.8	▼3.7
AfD	Steffen Schäfer	6,385	4.5		7,395	5.2	
FW	Raphael Bablick	5,469	3.8		4,443	3.1	
Left	Markus Bannert	3,712	2.6	▼1.8	4,178	2.9	▼1.6
FDP	Frank Hansen	3,125	2.2	▼9.7	7,322	5.1	▼10.7
Pirates					2,611	1.8	0.0
ÖDP	Rosa Maria Reindl	2,992	2.1	▼0.8	1,976	1.4	▼0.4
BP	Harold Amann	2,791	2.0		2,177	1.5	▲0.5
REP					1,052	0.7	▼0.5
Tierschutzpartei					1,029	0.7	0.0
NPD					607	0.4	▼0.3
Independent		290	0.2				
DIE FRAUEN					247	0.2	
DIE VIOLETTEN					171	0.1	▼0.1
RRP		178	0.1		119	0.1	▼0.9
Party of Reason					115	0.1	
PRO					92	0.1	
BüSo					31	0.0	0.0
MLPD					25	0.0	0.0
Informal votes		1,083			929		
Total valid votes		142,543			142,697		
Turnout		143,626	74.7	▼0.8			
CSU hold	Majority	51,758	36.3	▲5.0			

=== 2009 election ===
Federal election (2009): Erding – Ebersberg
Notes:	Blue background denotes the winner of the electorate vote. Pink background denotes a candidate elected from their party list. Yellow background denotes an electorate win by a list member, or other incumbent. A ✓ or ✗ denotes status of any incumbent, win or lose respectively.						
Party	Candidate	Votes	%	±%	Party votes	%	±%
CSU	✓ Maximilian Lehmer	67,518	48.9	▼9.5	61,088	43.9	▼8.7
SPD	Ewald Schurer	24,402	17.7	▼7.2	19,106	13.7	▼7.6
Greens	Stefan Kisters	17,573	12.7	▲5.2	17,458	12.5	▲3.7
FDP	Thomas Fickenwirth	16,433	11.9	▲6.5	22,094	15.9	▲5.3
Left	Walter Koppe	6,073	4.4	▲1.8	6,265	4.5	▲1.8
Pirates					2,562	1.8	
ÖDP	Rosa Maria Reindl	3,969	2.9		2,453	1.8	
REP					1,711	1.2	▲0.1
BP					1,434	1.0	▲0.4
RRP					1,416	1.0	
NPD	Waldemar Horn	1,837	1.3	▼0.1	1,018	0.7	0.0
FAMILIE					996	0.7	0.0
Tierschutzpartei					959	0.7	
Independent	Maike Porray	327	0.2				
DIE VIOLETTEN					289	0.2	
BüSo					251	0.2	
CM					114	0.1	
PBC					91	0.1	0.0
DVU					60	0.0	
MLPD					35	0.0	0.0
Informal votes		2,228			1,157		
Total valid votes		138,132			139,203		
Turnout		140,360	75.5	▼6.1			
CSU hold	Majority	43,116	31.2	▼2.4			

=== 2005 election ===
Federal election (2005): Erding – Ebersberg
Notes:	Blue background denotes the winner of the electorate vote. Pink background denotes a candidate elected from their party list. Yellow background denotes an electorate win by a list member, or other incumbent. A ✓ or ✗ denotes status of any incumbent, win or lose respectively.						
Party	Candidate	Votes	%	±%	Party votes	%	±%
CSU	Maximilian Lehmer	83,991	58.4	▼3.4	76,249	52.6	▼9.2
SPD	Ewald Schurer	35,731	24.8	▼1.6	30,981	20.41	▼0.2
Greens	Helga Stieglmeier	10,767	7.5	▲1.5	12,844	8.9	▲0.2
FDP	Thomas Fickenwirth	7,708	5.4	▲1.4	15,256	10.5	▲5.7
Left	Dieter Hartdegen	3,698	2.6	▲1.7	3,947	2.7	▲2.0
NPD	Robert Dietrich	2,038	1.4		1,066	0.7	▲0.6
REP					1,667	1.1	▲0.4
Familie					1,014	0.7	
BP					858	0.6	▲0.4
GRAUEN					447	0.3	▲0.2
Feminist					364	0.3	▲0.1
PBC					143	0.1	▲0.1
BüSo					82	0.1	
MLPD					44	0.0	
Informal votes		2,351			1,322		
Total valid votes		143,933			144,962		
Turnout		146,284	81.5	▼3.1			
CSU hold	Majority	48,260	33.6				
