= Volker Mayer-Lay =

German politician

Volker Mayer-Lay MdB
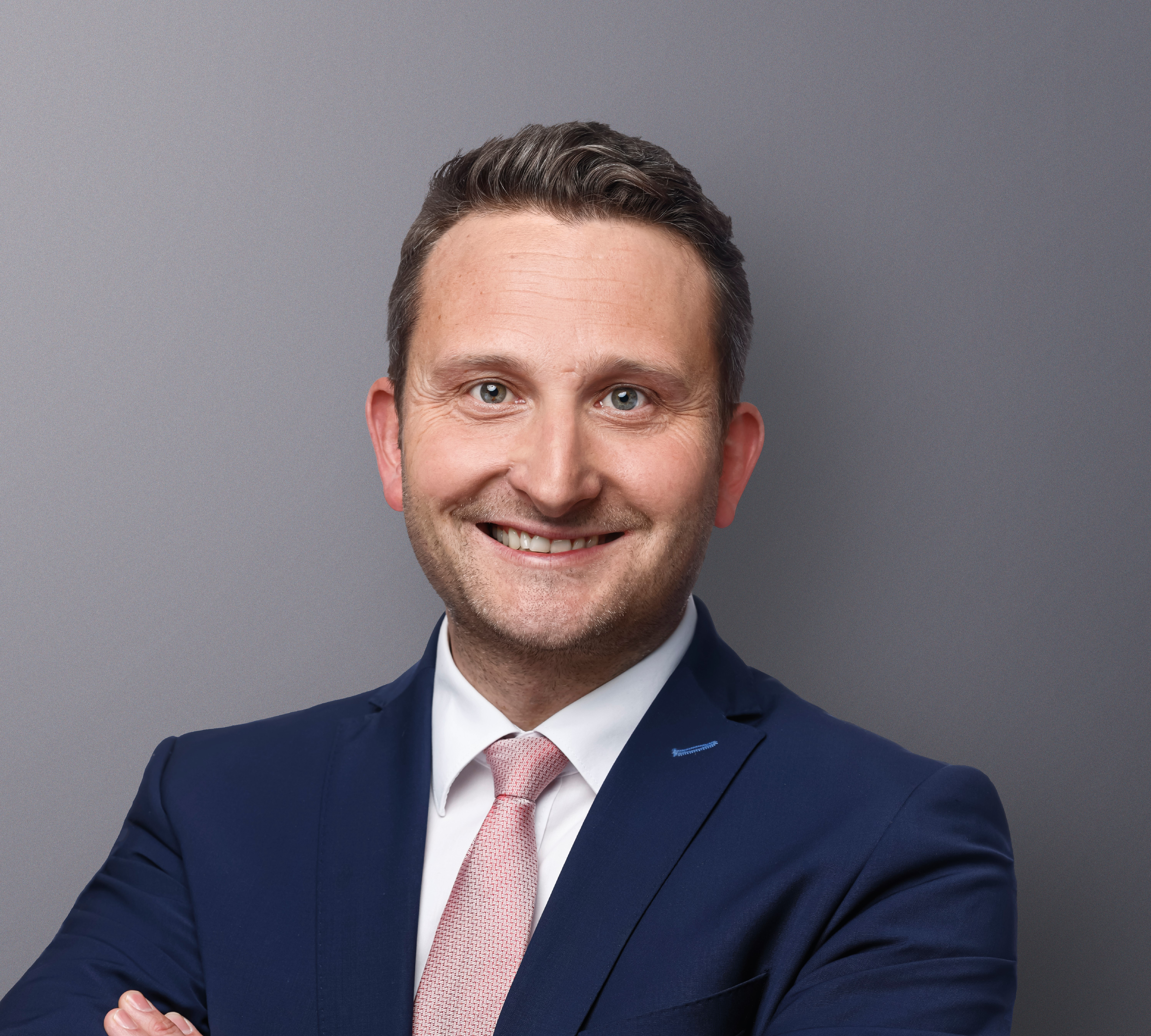
- Mayer-Lay in 2021

Member of the Bundestag; for Bodensee
- Incumbent
- Assumed office 26 October 2021
- Preceded by: Lothar Riebsamen

Personal details
- Born: 22 June 1981 (age 45) Überlingen, West Germany
- Party: Christian Democratic Union
- Education: University of Konstanz

Volker Mayer-Lay (born 22 June 1981) is a German politician. He has been a member of the Bundestag for the CDU since 2021.

== Early life and education ==
Mayer-Lay attended the elementary school Nußdorf from 1988 and graduated from the general high school in Überlingen in 2001. He served in the military for a year in Sigmaringen. He studied law at the University of Konstanz until 2008 and passed his first state law examination. This was followed by his legal clerkship at the Regional Court of Constance, the Public Prosecutor's Office of Constance, and the administrative station at the Regional Council of Tübingen, among others. In 2010, he passed his second state examination in law.

== Legal career ==
In June 2010, he was admitted to the bar by the Freiburg Bar Association. The next month, he started his independent practice as a lawyer in the law firm "Mayer-Lay und Kollegen" in Überlingen. In December 2014, the Freiburg Bar Association entitled him to use the designation "Specialist Lawyer for Tenancy & Residential Property Law", followed by "specialist lawyer for traffic law" the next year. In March 2017, he was appointed ADAC contract attorney for the Überlingen area.

== Political career ==
From 2002 to 2017, Mayer-Lay was a member of the Junge Union, and he has been a member of the CDU since 2003. From 2003 to 2008, he was district chairman of the Junge Union Bodensee. Since 2004, he has been a member of the Pan-European Union of Germany, serving for several years on the Baden-Württemberg state board of the Pan-European Youth. Mayer-Lay was an assessor in the local executive committee of the CDU Überlingen from 2005 until 2009, and was press spokesman there from 2009 until 2014. In addition, he was a local councilor in the Überlingen suburb of Nußdorf from 2009 to 2019. From 2010 to 2011, he was a member of the district executive committee of the Junge Union Württemberg-Hohenzollern. Mayer-Lay was deputy district chairman of the CDU Bodenseekreis from 2010 to 2017. He has been a member of the state committee on energy, environment and climate protection of the CDU Baden-Württemberg since 2012. From 2014 to 2016, he was deputy local chairman of the CDU Überlingen.

From 2014 to 2019, Mayer-Lay was a city councilor of the large district town of Überlingen and deputy parliamentary group spokesman as well as supervisory board member of Überlingen Marketing und Tourismus GmbH. He was a member of the supervisory board of the Überlingen municipal utility from 2017 to 2019. Mayer-Lay has been district chairman of the CDU Bodenseekreis and a member of the Mittelstandsunion since 2017. He has been a member of the State Committee on External Security and Development of the CDU Baden-Württemberg since 2018. He has been a district councilor in the Bodenseekreis district council and a member of the Bodensee-Oberschwaben regional association assembly since 2019. Mayer-Lay has been a member of the supervisory board of Caritas in the Linzgau deanery since 2020. He has also been a member of the Climate Union since 2021.

In the 2021 Bundestag election, he won the direct mandate in the Bundestag constituency of Lake Constance with 30.4% of the primary vote.

== Personal life ==
Mayer-Lay was born 1981 in the West German town of Überlingen and is of Roman Catholic denomination.
