= Maria Heubuch =

German politician and Member of the European Parliament (born 1958)

Maria Heubuch MEP
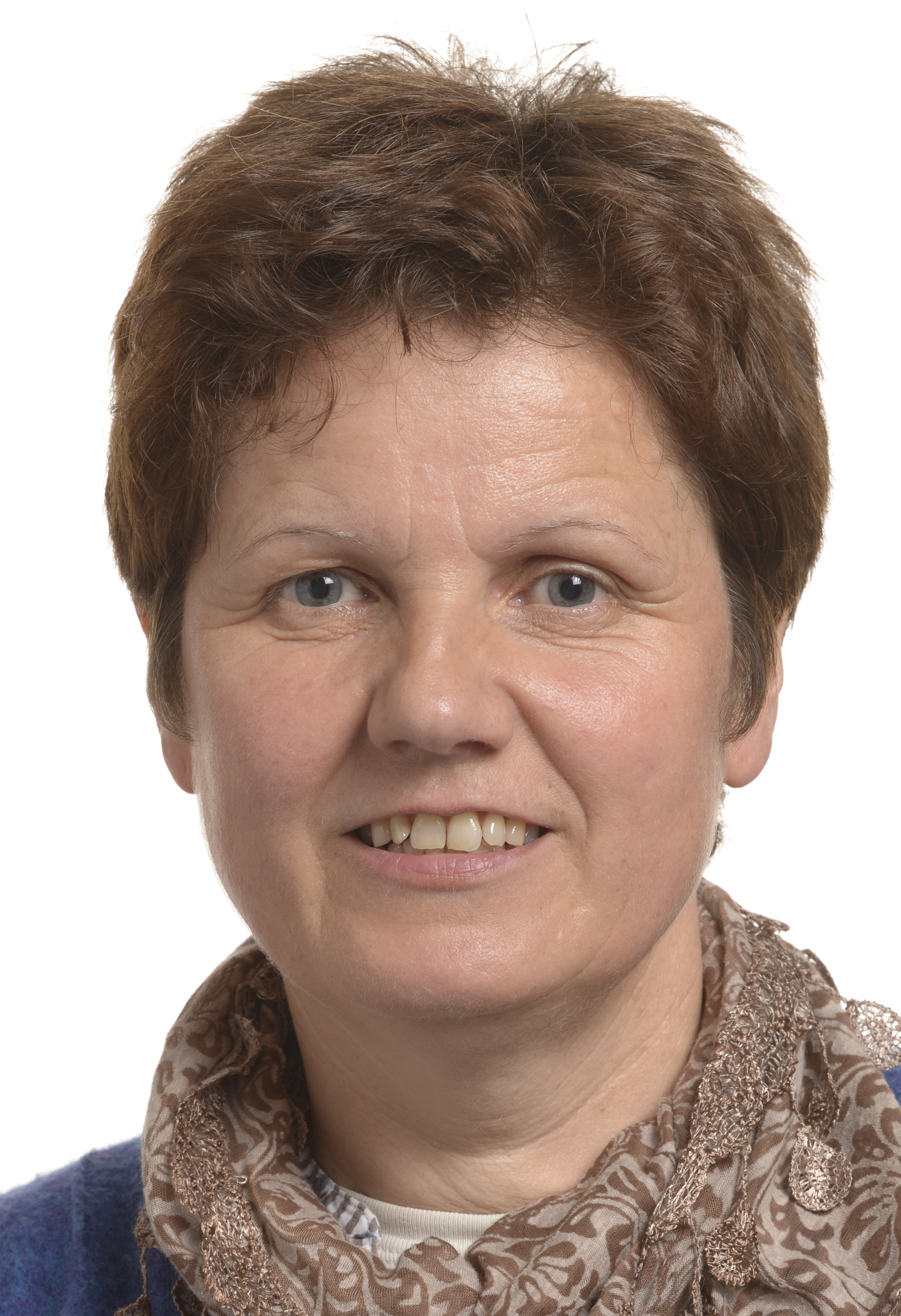

Member of the European Parliament
- In office 1 July 2014 – 2019
- Constituency: Germany

Personal details
- Born: 3 December 1958 (age 67) Ravensburg, Baden-Württemberg Germany
- Party: German: Alliance 90/The Greens; European Union: The Greens–European Free Alliance
- Website: www.maria-heubuch.eu

Maria Heubuch (born 12 December 1958) is a German politician and Member of the European Parliament (MEP) representing Germany since July 2014. She is a member of the Alliance 90/The Greens, part of the European Green Party.

Prior to entering politics Heubuch worked as a farmer and was a carer. She also served in various roles within the German farming community such as Federal Chair of the Working Group on Small-Scale Farming, District team member of the Association of German Dairy Farmers and board member of the Association for the Preservation of Family Farms.

== Parliamentary service ==
- Vice-chair, Delegation for relations with the Pan-African Parliament (2014-)
- Member, Committee on Development (2014-)
- Member, Delegation to the ACP-EU Joint Parliamentary Assembly (2014-)
