= Sandra Carstensen =

German politician

Member of the Bundestag
- Incumbent
- Assumed office 2025
- Preceded by: Kristian Klinck
- Constituency: Plön – Neumünster

Personal details
- Party: Christian Democratic Union
- Website: https://sandra-carstensen.de/

Sandra Carstensen (née Thomsen; born 1971) is a German politician from the Christian Democratic Union (CDU). In the 2025 federal election, she ran in the Plön – Neumünster federal constituency and won with 32.7% of the first vote and entered the German Bundestag.

She is the wife of former Minister President of Schleswig-Holstein Peter Harry Carstensen.
