= Michael Bürsch =

German politician

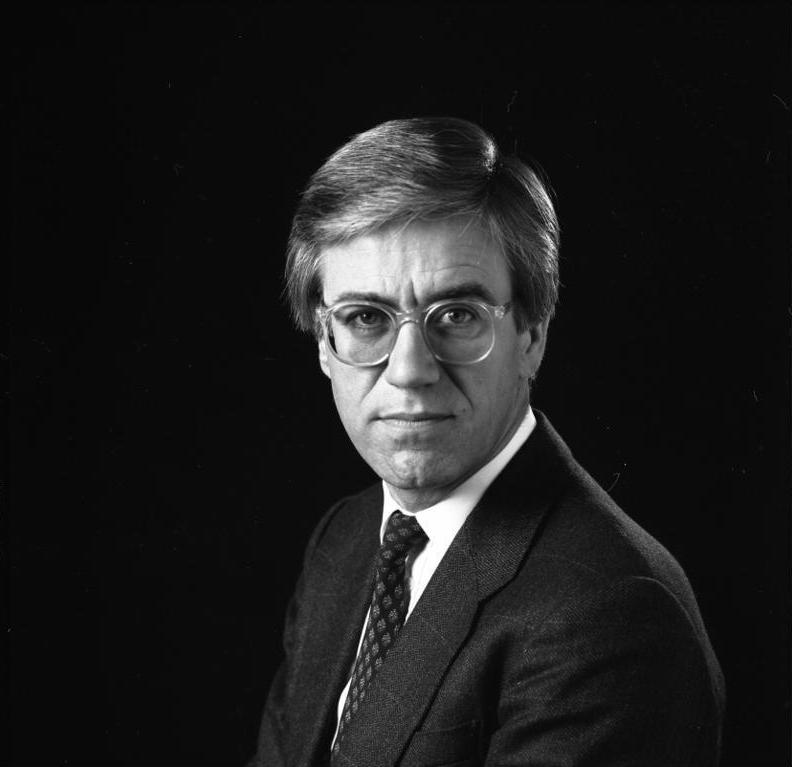
Michael Bürsch (1985)

Michael Peter Karsten Bürsch (3 June 1942 – 9 December 2012) was a German politician and member of the SPD. He was born in Stettin (Szczecin), Province of Pomerania, which is now in Poland.
