= Karl Eigen =

German politician (1927–2016)

- In office 1972–1976
- In office 1980–1990

Personal details
- Born: November 3, 1927
- Died: May 13, 2016 (aged 88)

Karl Eigen (3 November 1927 – 13 May 2016) was a German farmer and politician for the Christian Democratic Union. From 1962 until 1969, he served as a member of the municipal council of Stockelsdorf. He went on to serve as a member of the Bundestag from 1972 until 1976 and 1980 until 1990. He served as chairman of the Farmers' Association of Schleswig-Holstein from 1984 until 1994, and served as an honorary president from 1994 until his death. He was an early advocate of using canola oil for biodiesel.
