= Andreas Lenz =

German politician (born 1981)

Andreas Lenz MdB
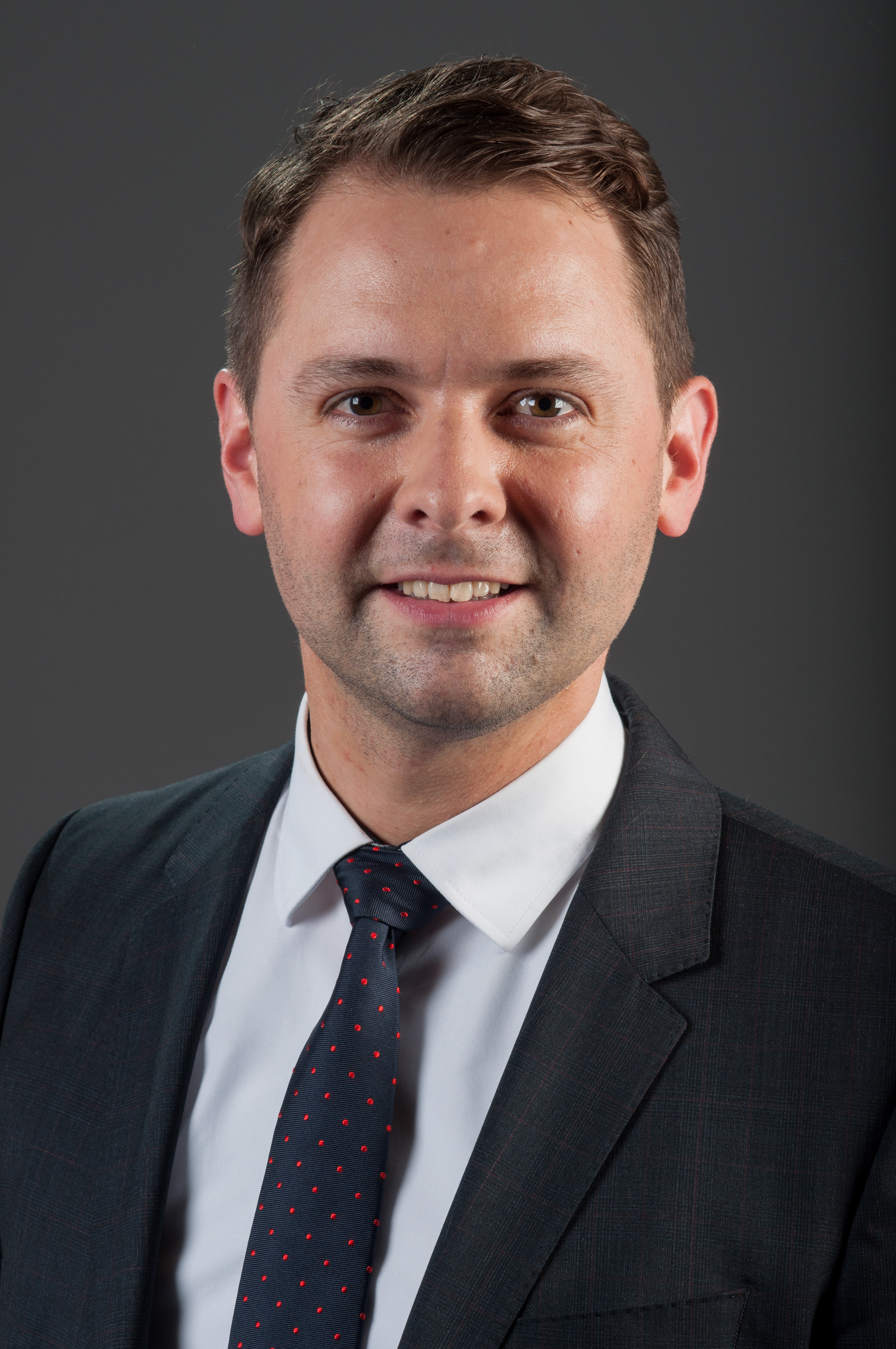
- Lenz in 2014

Member of the Bundestag; for Erding – Ebersberg
- Incumbent
- Assumed office 22 October 2013
- Preceded by: Maximilian Lehmer

Personal details
- Born: 23 April 1981 (age 45) Ebersberg, West Germany
- Party: Christian Social Union
- Education: TH Rosenheim; LMU Munich

Andreas Lenz (born 23 April 1981) is a German politician of the Christian Social Union (CSU) who has been serving as a member of the Bundestag from the state of Bavaria since 2013.

== Political career ==
Lenz first became a member of the Bundestag after the 2013 German federal election. He has been serving on the Committee for Economics and Energy and the Parliamentary Advisory Board on Sustainable Development. In 2018, he became the chairman of the Parliamentary Advisory Board on Sustainable Development.

In addition to his committee assignments, Lenz has been chairing the German-British Parliamentary Friendship Group since 2018.

In the negotiations to form a coalition government under the leadership of Chancellor Angela Merkel following the 2017 federal elections, Lenz was part of the working group on economic policy, led Thomas Strobl, Alexander Dobrindt and Brigitte Zypries.

== Other activities ==
- Nuclear Waste Disposal Fund (KENFO), Member of the Board of Trustees (since 2022)
- Energy and Climate Policy and Innovation Council (EPICO), Member of the advisory board (since 2021)
- Bundesverband Bioenergie (BBE), Member of the Advisory Board
- German Industry Initiative for Energy Efficiency (DENEFF), Member of the Parliamentary Advisory Board

== Political positions ==
In June 2017, Lenz voted against Germany's introduction of same-sex marriage.
