= Christoph Frauenpreiß =

German politician (born 1987)

Christoph Frauenpreiß MdB

Member of the Bundestag; for Cuxhaven – Stade II
- Incumbent
- Assumed office 25 March 2025
- Preceded by: Daniel Schneider

Personal details
- Born: 15 November 1984 (age 41) Cuxhaven, West Germany
- Party: Christian Democratic Union
- Children: 2
- Education: Frankfurt School of Finance & Management
- Website: https://christoph-frauenpreiss.de/

Christoph Frauenpreiß (born 30 January 1987) is a German politician from the Christian Democratic Union (CDU).

In the 2025 German federal election, he was the direct candidate in Cuxhaven – Stade II and was elected with 32.7% of the first vote.

Frauenpreiß is a father of two, and lives with his wife and children in Altenbruch.

== See also ==
- List of members of the 21st Bundestag
