= Philipp Murmann =

German businessman and politician

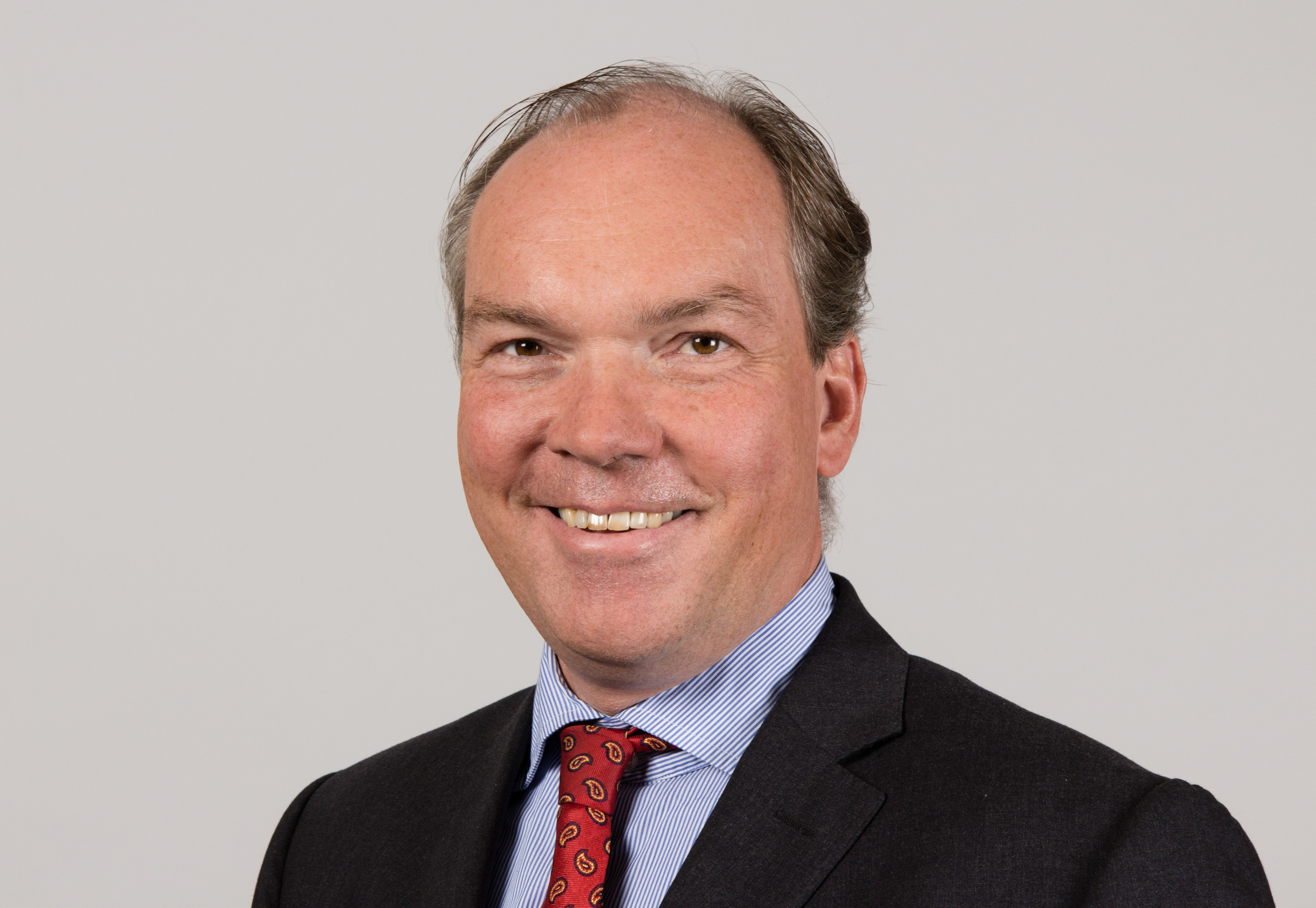

Member of the German Bundestag
- In office 2009–2017

Personal details
- Born: May 15, 1964 (age 61) Kiel, Germany
- Party: CDU
- Education: Technical University of Munich; Kiel University
- Occupation: Politician, businessman

Philipp Murmann (born 15 May 1964, in Kiel) is a German businessman and politician. He is a member of the CDU party. Murmann is also federal treasurer of the CDU and thus a federal board member of the party. Between 2009 and 2017, he was an MP of the German Bundestag.

== Education and career ==
After high school, Murmann served as a Bundeswehr soldier from 1983 to 1985. Afterwards, he studied Mechanical Engineering (Maschinenbau) at the Technical University of Munich. In 1994, he graduated in Business Administration, Innovation Management discipline, from Kiel University. From 1994, Murmann worked for ABB, in 1999 he left for an employment at TESSAG/RWE. In 2001, he took over the family business Zöllner Holding GmbH in Kiel.

Murmann was first elected to the German Bundestag in the 2009 federal elections. In the negotiations to form a Grand Coalition of Chancellor Angela Merkel's Christian Democrats (CDU together with the Bavarian CSU) and the Social Democrats following the 2013 federal elections, he was part of the CDU/CSU delegation in the working group on education and research policy, led by Johanna Wanka and Doris Ahnen.

In July 2016, Murmann announced that he would not stand in the 2017 federal elections but instead resign from active politics by the end of the parliamentary term.

== Other activities ==
- PEKU Folien GmbH, Chairman of the Advisory Board
- German Federation of Industrial Research Associations (AiF), Member of the Senate
- Helmholtz Centre for Ocean Research, Member of the Board of Trustees
- Leibniz Institute for Science and Mathematics Education at the University of Kiel, Member of the Board of Trustees
- Max Planck Institute for Evolutionary Biology, Member of the Board of Trustees

== Personal life ==
Murmann is married and has four children.
