= Ülker Radziwill =

German politician

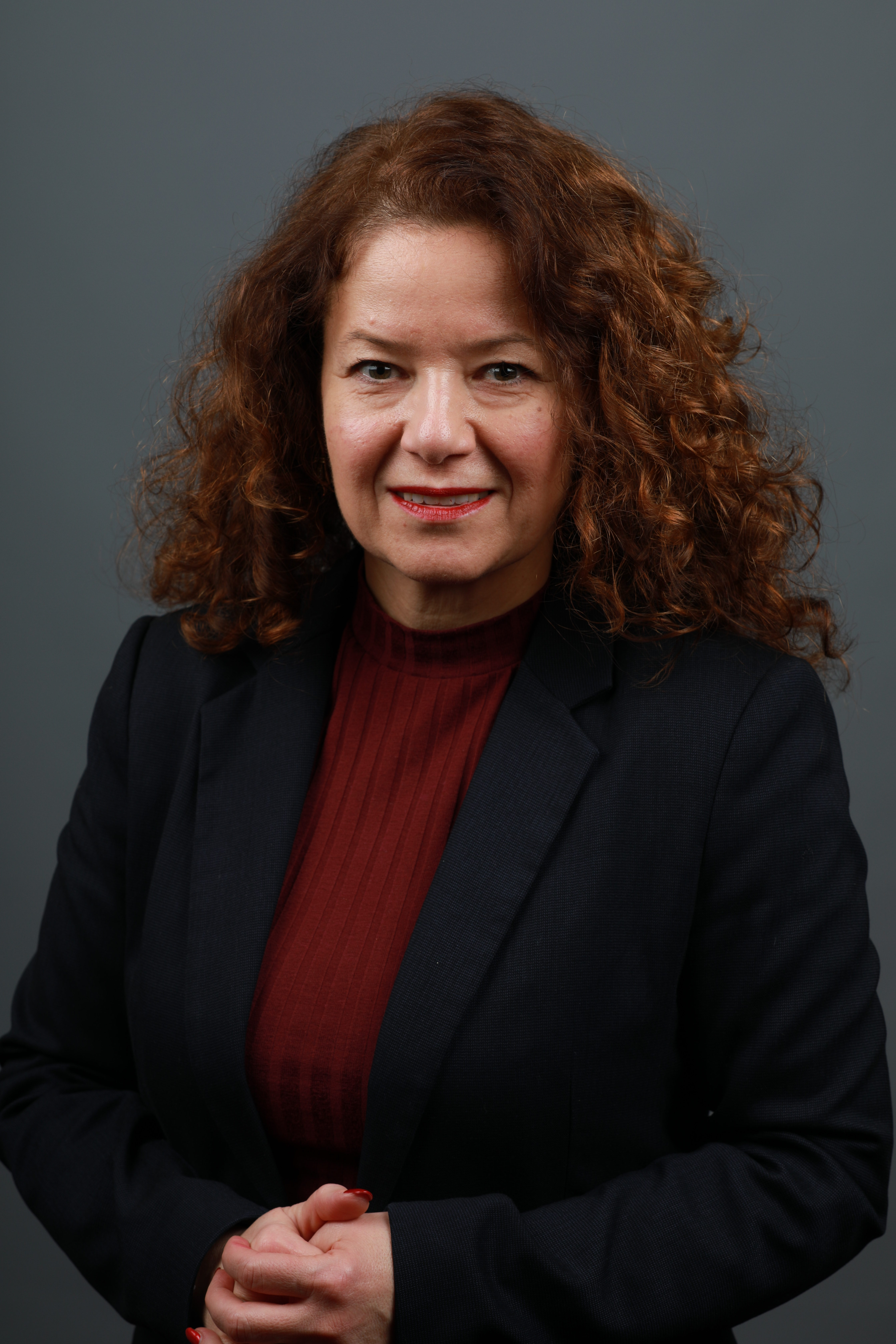
- Ülker Radziwill in 2017

Member of the Abgeordnetenhaus of Berlin
- Incumbent
- Assumed office 2023
- In office 2001–2021

Personal details
- Born: 10 June 1966 (age 60) Fethiye, Turkey
- Party: Social Democratic Party

Ülker Radziwill (born 10 June 1966) is a Turkish-born German politician from the Social Democratic Party (SPD). She has been a member of the Abgeordnetenhaus of Berlin since 2023, having previously served from 2001 to 2021. She is the chair of the Democratic Left 21 Forum within the SPD. From 2021 to 2023, she was State Secretary for Tenant Protection and Neighborhood Development in the Berlin Senate Department for Urban Development, Construction and Housing.

Radziwill has been the state chairwoman of the AWO state association Berlin since 11 November 2023.

== Biography ==
Radziwill has lived in Berlin since 1973, where she attended primary and secondary school until graduating from high school. After training as a tourism specialist, she initially ran her own travel agency for several years, later becoming a travel agency manager. She was married to the lawyer Claus Radziwill (1959–2023) until his death.

Radziwill joined the Social Democratic Party (SPD) in 1994. From 2004 to 2012, she chaired the SPD's state working group on migration and was a member of the SPD's state executive committee. She has been a member of the latter again since 2018. She is also a member of the Workers' Welfare Association (AWO) and the Association of Turkish Social Democrats in Berlin. Radziwill belongs to the left wing of the SPD and has been a member of the federal executive committee of the Democratic Left 21 Forum (DL 21) since 2011, serving as its deputy chair from 2017 to 2021 and as co-chair from 2021 to 2023.

Since 11 November 2023, Ülker Radziwill has been the state chair of the Berlin branch of the Workers' Welfare Association.

== Abgeordnetenhaus of Berlin ==
From the 15th legislative period (2001–2006), Radziwill was a directly elected member of the Berlin House of Representatives (MdA) for the Charlottenburg-Wilmersdorf 3 constituency. From the 16th legislative period (2006–2011), she served on the Committee on Integration, Labour and Social Affairs and the Committee on Construction and Housing. In 2008, she was one of the first German social policy experts to draw attention to the problem of steadily rising rents and called for limits on rent increases.

In the 17th legislative period (2011–2016), she was re-elected to the Berlin House of Representatives as a directly elected member. During this same period, she served as the SPD's spokesperson on the second parliamentary inquiry committee investigating the "Clarification of the Causes, Consequences and Responsibility for the Cost and Schedule Overruns in the Renovation of the Berlin State Opera," the so-called State Opera Inquiry Committee.

In the 18th legislative period (2016–2021), Radziwill was once again directly elected to the Berlin House of Representatives. She chaired the Committee on Urban Development and Housing, was deputy chair of the SPD parliamentary group in the Berlin House of Representatives, and served as spokesperson for social affairs, senior citizens, and long-term care, as well as spokesperson for the Committee on Civic Engagement/Participation. Radziwill was also a member of the Council of Elders of the Abgeordnetenhaus of Berlin.

She failed to win re-election in the 2021 state election. She regained her seat in the House of Representatives in the repeat election in 2023.

== State Secretary ==
In December 2021, following the formation of the Giffey Senate, she was appointed State Secretary for Tenant Protection in the Senate Department for Urban Development, Construction and Housing under Senator Andreas Geisel. She resigned as State Secretary upon her re-election to the House of Representatives in March 2023.

== Federal Assembly ==
Radziwill was appointed by the Berlin House of Representatives as a member of the 14th Federal Convention on June 30, 2010, and participated in the election of the Federal President.

She was also a member of the 16th Federal Assembly on 12 February 2017.

== Bundestag candidacy ==
In the 2013 German federal election, Radziwill ran for the direct mandate in the Berlin-Charlottenburg-Wilmersdorf constituency but lost to the CDU candidate , Klaus-Dieter Gröhler. Since she did not run on the Die Linke state list, she was not elected to the Bundestag and remained a member of the Berlin House of Representatives.

Radziwill competed with former Berlin State Secretary for Culture Tim Renner for the party's internal nomination for the direct mandate in the Berlin-Charlottenburg-Wilmersdorf constituency for the Bundestag election on September 24, 2017. Renner prevailed internally on March 17, 2017.

== See also ==
- List of members of the 19th Abgeordnetenhaus of Berlin (2021–2023)
- List of members of the 19th Abgeordnetenhaus of Berlin (2023–2026)
