= Minden-Lübbecke I =

Federal electoral district of Germany

133 Minden-Lübbecke I
- Electoral district for the Bundestag
- Minden-Lübbecke I in 2025
- State: North Rhine-Westphalia
- Population: 261,800 (2019)
- Electorate: 201,888 (2021)
- Major settlements: Minden; Porta Westfalica; Lübbecke
- Area: 1,087.6 km^{2}

Current electoral district
- Created: 1949
- Party: CDU
- Member: Oliver Vogt
- Elected: 2025

Minden-Lübbecke I is an electoral constituency (German: Wahlkreis) represented in the Bundestag. It elects one member via first-past-the-post voting. Under the current constituency numbering system, it is designated as constituency 133. It is located in eastern North Rhine-Westphalia, comprising most of the Minden-Lübbecke district.

Minden-Lübbecke I was created for the inaugural 1949 federal election. From 2017 to 2025, it has been represented by Achim Post of the Social Democratic Party (SPD). Since 2025 it has been represented by Oliver Vogt of the CDU.

== Geography ==
Minden-Lübbecke I is located in eastern North Rhine-Westphalia. As of the 2021 federal election, it comprises the entirety of the Minden-Lübbecke district excluding the municipality of Bad Oeynhausen.

== History ==
Minden-Lübbecke I was created in 1949, then known as Minden – Lübbecke. From 1965 through 1976, it was named Minden. From 1980 through 1994, it was named Minden-Lübbecke. In the 1998 election, it was named Minden-Lübbecke II. It acquired its current name in the 2002 election. In the 1949 election, it was North Rhine-Westphalia constituency 51 in the numbering system. From 1953 through 1961, it was number 110. From 1965 through 1976, it was number 108. From 1980 through 1998, it was number 104. From 2002 through 2009, it was number 135. In the 2013 through 2021 elections, it was number 134. From the 2025 election, it has been number 133.

Originally, the constituency comprised the districts of Minden and Lübbecke. In the 1976 through 1994 elections, it was coterminous with the Minden-Lübbecke district. In the 1998 election, it lost the Ortsteile of Bad Oeynhausen-Lohe and Bad Oeynhausen-Rehme. It acquired its current borders in the 2002 election.

Election	No.	Name	Borders
1949	51	Minden – Lübbecke	Minden district; Lübbecke district
1953	110	Minden – Lübbecke	Minden district; Lübbecke district
1957	110	Minden – Lübbecke	Minden district; Lübbecke district
1961	110	Minden – Lübbecke	Minden district; Lübbecke district
1965	108	Minden	Minden district; Lübbecke district
1969	108	Minden	Minden district; Lübbecke district
1972	108	Minden	Minden district; Lübbecke district
1976	108	Minden	Minden-Lübbecke district
1980	104	Minden-Lübbecke	Minden-Lübbecke district
1983	104	Minden-Lübbecke	Minden-Lübbecke district
1987	104	Minden-Lübbecke	Minden-Lübbecke district
1990	104	Minden-Lübbecke	Minden-Lübbecke district
1994	104	Minden-Lübbecke	Minden-Lübbecke district
1998	104	Minden-Lübbecke II	Minden-Lübbecke district (excluding Bad Oeynhausen-Lohe and Bad Oeynhausen-Rehme Ortsteile)
2002	135	Minden-Lübbecke I	Minden-Lübbecke district (excluding Bad Oeynhausen municipality)
2005	135	Minden-Lübbecke I	Minden-Lübbecke district (excluding Bad Oeynhausen municipality)
2009	135	Minden-Lübbecke I	Minden-Lübbecke district (excluding Bad Oeynhausen municipality)
2013	134	Minden-Lübbecke I	Minden-Lübbecke district (excluding Bad Oeynhausen municipality)
2017	134	Minden-Lübbecke I	Minden-Lübbecke district (excluding Bad Oeynhausen municipality)
2021	134	Minden-Lübbecke I	Minden-Lübbecke district (excluding Bad Oeynhausen municipality)
2025	133	Minden-Lübbecke I	Minden-Lübbecke district (excluding Bad Oeynhausen municipality)

== Members ==
The constituency has been held by the Social Democratic Party (SPD) during all but three Bundestag terms since 1949. It was first represented by Paul Bleiß of the SPD from 1949 to 1965, followed by Friedrich Schonhofen until 1976. Lothar Ibrügger then served from 1976 to 2009, a total of nine consecutive terms. Steffen Kampeter of the Christian Democratic Union (CDU) won the constituency in 2009, and was re-elected in 2013. Achim Post regained it for the SPD in 2017 and was re-elected in 2021. In 2025 Oliver Vogt took the seat for the CDU.

Election	Member	Party	%
1949	Paul Bleiß	SPD	41.8
1953	Paul Bleiß	SPD	40.4
1957	Paul Bleiß	SPD	41.7
1961	Paul Bleiß	SPD	44.0
1965	Friedrich Schonhofen	SPD	45.9
1969	Friedrich Schonhofen	SPD	48.3
1972	Friedrich Schonhofen	SPD	52.8
1976	Lothar Ibrügger	SPD	49.7
1980	Lothar Ibrügger	SPD	51.4
1983	Lothar Ibrügger	SPD	46.7
1987	Lothar Ibrügger	SPD	50.1
1990	Lothar Ibrügger	SPD	46.9
1994	Lothar Ibrügger	SPD	48.7
1998	Lothar Ibrügger	SPD	52.9
2002	Lothar Ibrügger	SPD	49.7
2005	Lothar Ibrügger	SPD	47.5
2009	Steffen Kampeter	CDU	42.5
2013	Steffen Kampeter	CDU	41.1
2017	Achim Post	SPD	37.4
2021	Achim Post	SPD	38.4
2025	Oliver Vogt	CDU	32.1

== Election results ==
=== 2025 election ===
Federal election (2025): Minden-Lübbecke I
Notes:	Blue background denotes the winner of the electorate vote. Pink background denotes a candidate elected from their party list. Yellow background denotes an electorate win by a list member, or other incumbent. A ✓ or ✗ denotes status of any incumbent, win or lose respectively.						
Party	Candidate	Votes	%	±%	Party votes	%	±%
CDU	Oliver Vogt	51,975	32.1	▲6.0	44,594	27.5	▲3.9
SPD	Fabian Golanowsky	39,931	24.7	▼13.7	35,926	22.1	▼10.4
AfD	Thomas Röckemann	35,399	21.9	▲13.0	35,284	21.8	▲12.6
Greens	Schahina Gambir	15,008	9.3	▼1.2	15,379	9.5	▼3.6
Left	Dominik Goertz	9,061	5.6	▲3.0	10,761	6.6	▲3.4
BSW					7,259	4.5	
FDP	Frank Schäffler	5,432	3.4	▼4.9	6,784	4.2	▼7.4
FW	Frank Busse	2,975	1.8	▲0.5	1,312	0.8	▼0.1
Tierschutzpartei					1,772	1.1	▼0.1
Volt	Christian Fried	1,246	0.8		636	0.4	▲0.2
PARTEI				▼1.7	977	0.6	▼0.5
Values	Frank Hägermann	665	0.4		260	0.2	
dieBasis				▼1.3	457	0.3	▼1.1
PdF					302	0.2	▲0.2
Team Todenhöfer					229	0.1	▼0.1
BD					226	0.1	
MERA25					36	0.0	
MLPD					25	0.0	0.0
Bündnis C				▼0.8			▼0.7
Pirates							▼0.4
Gesundheitsforschung							▼0.1
Humanists							▼0.1
ÖDP							▼0.1
SGP						0.0	0.0
Informal votes		1,731			1,204		
Total valid votes		161,692			161,219		
Turnout		163,423	82.1	▲6.3			
CDU gain from SPD	Majority	12,044	7.4				

=== 2021 election ===
Federal election (2021): Minden-Lübbecke I
Notes:	Blue background denotes the winner of the electorate vote. Pink background denotes a candidate elected from their party list. Yellow background denotes an electorate win by a list member, or other incumbent. A ✓ or ✗ denotes status of any incumbent, win or lose respectively.						
Party	Candidate	Votes	%	±%	Party votes	%	±%
SPD	✓ Achim Post	58,168	38.4	▲1.0	49,351	32.6	▲3.2
CDU	Oliver Vogt	39,679	26.2	▼9.3	35,814	23.6	▼9.2
Greens	Schahina Gambir	15,886	10.5	▲5.6	19,762	13.0	▲6.6
AfD	Sebastian Landwehr	13,445	8.9	▼1.0	13,892	9.2	▼1.4
FDP	Frank Schäffler	12,494	8.2	▲1.2	17,486	11.5	▲0.3
Left	Jule Kegel	3,940	2.6	▼2.7	4,857	3.2	▼3.1
Tierschutzpartei					1,838	1.2	▲0.6
PARTEI	Sebastian Schmitz	2,648	1.7		1,743	1.1	▲0.4
FW	Michael Müller	2,098	1.4		1,378	0.9	▲0.6
dieBasis	Stephan Lorenzen	1,974	1.3		2,050	1.4	
Bündnis C	Dietrich Janzen	1,184	0.8		1,050	0.7	
Pirates					542	0.4	▼0.1
Team Todenhöfer					394	0.3	
Volt					226	0.1	
LIEBE					187	0.1	
Gesundheitsforschung					171	0.1	0.0
LfK					164	0.1	
NPD					132	0.1	▼0.1
Humanists					132	0.1	0.0
ÖDP					102	0.1	0.0
du.					93	0.1	
V-Partei3					73	0.0	▼0.1
PdF					45	0.0	
LKR					30	0.0	
DKP					24	0.0	0.0
MLPD					23	0.0	0.0
SGP					13	0.0	0.0
Informal votes		1,419			1,363		
Total valid votes		151,516			151,572		
Turnout		152,935	75.8	▲1.7			
SPD hold	Majority	18,489	12.2	▲10.3			

=== 2017 election ===
Federal election (2017): Minden-Lübbecke I
Notes:	Blue background denotes the winner of the electorate vote. Pink background denotes a candidate elected from their party list. Yellow background denotes an electorate win by a list member, or other incumbent. A ✓ or ✗ denotes status of any incumbent, win or lose respectively.						
Party	Candidate	Votes	%	±%	Party votes	%	±%
SPD	Achim Post	55,868	37.4	▼3.2	43,966	29.4	▼5.0
CDU	Oliver Vogt	53,057	35.5	▼10.8	49,160	32.8	▼8.2
AfD	Jürgen Sprick	14,796	9.9		15,829	10.6	▲7.0
FDP	Frank Schäffler	10,575	7.1	▲5.2	16,865	11.3	▲6.7
Left	Sebastian Jerry Neumann	7,862	5.3	▲1.1	9,432	6.3	▲1.4
Greens	Jana Sasse	7,372	4.9	▲0.8	9,625	6.4	▼0.9
PARTEI					1,052	0.7	▲0.4
Tierschutzpartei					947	0.6	
Pirates					626	0.4	▼1.6
FW					484	0.3	▲0.1
NPD					293	0.2	▼0.5
AD-DEMOKRATEN					228	0.2	
BGE					169	0.1	
ÖDP					157	0.1	0.0
DM					156	0.1	
V-Partei³					153	0.1	
Volksabstimmung					148	0.1	▼0.1
Gesundheitsforschung					145	0.1	
DiB					121	0.1	
Die Humanisten					79	0.1	
MLPD					51	0.0	0.0
DKP					19	0.0	
SGP					4	0.0	0.0
Informal votes		1,651			1,508		
Total valid votes		149,530			149,673		
Turnout		151,181	74.0	▲3.5			
SPD gain from CDU	Majority	2,811	1.9				

=== 2013 election ===
Federal election (2013): Minden-Lübbecke I
Notes:	Blue background denotes the winner of the electorate vote. Pink background denotes a candidate elected from their party list. Yellow background denotes an electorate win by a list member, or other incumbent. A ✓ or ✗ denotes status of any incumbent, win or lose respectively.						
Party	Candidate	Votes	%	±%	Party votes	%	±%
CDU	✓ Steffen Kampeter	66,385	46.3	▲3.8	59,134	41.1	▲5.4
SPD	Achim Post	58,186	40.5	▲0.9	49,536	34.4	▲1.9
Left	Nadja Bühren	5,943	4.1	▼1.9	7,114	4.9	▼2.2
Greens	Burghard Grote	5,923	4.1	▼1.1	10,527	7.3	▼0.6
Pirates	Alexander Jäger	3,756	2.6		2,893	2.0	▲0.4
FDP	Andreas Eickmeier	2,738	1.9	▼4.7	6,640	4.6	▼7.8
AfD					5,170	3.6	
NPD					936	0.6	0.0
PARTEI					395	0.3	
FW	Thomas Gattner	593	0.4		358	0.2	
Volksabstimmung					254	0.2	▲0.1
PRO					244	0.2	
REP					239	0.2	▼0.4
ÖDP					151	0.1	0.0
Nichtwahler					141	0.1	
Party of Reason					89	0.1	
RRP					61	0.0	▼0.1
BIG					39	0.0	
PSG					31	0.0	0.0
MLPD					30	0.0	0.0
Die Rechte					28	0.0	
BüSo					16	0.0	0.0
Informal votes		2,113			1,611		
Total valid votes		143,524			144,026		
Turnout		145,637	70.5	▲0.1			
CDU hold	Majority	8,199	5.8	▲2.9			

=== 2009 election ===
Federal election (2009): Minden-Lübbecke I
Notes:	Blue background denotes the winner of the electorate vote. Pink background denotes a candidate elected from their party list. Yellow background denotes an electorate win by a list member, or other incumbent. A ✓ or ✗ denotes status of any incumbent, win or lose respectively.						
Party	Candidate	Votes	%	±%	Party votes	%	±%
CDU	Steffen Kampeter	61,751	42.5	▲1.7	51,869	35.6	▲0.8
SPD	Achim Post	57,561	39.6	▼7.9	47,299	32.5	▼8.6
FDP	Andreas Eickmeier	9,628	6.6	▲3.0	18,097	12.4	▲2.8
Left	Luzian Junkereit	8,809	6.1	▲2.5	10,401	7.1	▲2.3
Greens	Uwe Lämmel	7,636	5.3	▲2.7	11,482	7.9	▲1.6
Pirates					2,284	1.6	
NPD					917	0.6	▼0.2
FAMILIE					820	0.6	0.0
REP					771	0.5	▲0.1
Tierschutzpartei					713	0.5	▲0.1
RENTNER					397	0.3	
RRP					153	0.1	
ÖDP					113	0.1	
Volksabstimmung					98	0.1	0.0
DVU					83	0.1	
Centre					56	0.0	0.0
PSG					29	0.0	0.0
BüSo					22	0.0	0.0
MLPD					21	0.0	0.0
Informal votes		1,996			1,756		
Total valid votes		145,385			145,625		
Turnout		147,381	70.5	▼7.7			
CDU gain from SPD	Majority	4,190	2.9				

=== 2005 election ===
Federal election (2005): Minden-Lübbecke I
Notes:	Blue background denotes the winner of the electorate vote. Pink background denotes a candidate elected from their party list. Yellow background denotes an electorate win by a list member, or other incumbent. A ✓ or ✗ denotes status of any incumbent, win or lose respectively.						
Party	Candidate	Votes	%	±%	Party votes	%	±%
SPD	✓ Lothar Ibrügger	76,641	47.5	▼2.2	66,133	41.0	▼3.8
CDU	Steffen Kampeter	65,858	40.8	▲3.1	56,134	34.8	0.0
FDP	Dirk Schattschneider	5,845	3.6	▼2.7	15,449	9.6	▲0.3
Left	Lutz Schmelzer	5,774	3.6	▲2.8	7,875	4.9	▲4.0
Greens	Heinrich Stenau	4,071	2.5	▼0.9	10,054	6.2	▼0.48
NPD	Rainer Müller	1,666	1.0		1,274	0.8	▲0.6
Familie	Heinrich Oldenburg	1,497	0.9	▲0.5	966	0.6	▲0.3
REP					743	0.5	0.0
Tierschutzpartei					615	0.4	▲0.1
GRAUEN					347	0.2	▲0.1
PBC					212	0.8	▲0.2
From Now on... Democracy Through Referendum					152	0.1	
Socialist Equality Party					67	0.0	
BüSo					33	0.0	
Centre					27	0.0	
MLPD					27	0.0	
Informal votes		2,583			2,827		
Total valid votes		161,352			161,108		
Turnout		163,935	78.2	▼2.7			
SPD hold	Majority	10,783	6.7				
