= Berlin-Charlottenburg-Wilmersdorf =

Federal electoral district of Germany

79 Berlin-Charlottenburg-Wilmersdorf
- Electoral district for the Bundestag
- Berlin-Charlottenburg-Wilmersdorf in 2025
- State: Berlin
- Population: 286,100 (2019)
- Electorate: 196,800 (2021)
- Area: 57.1 km^{2}

Current electoral district
- Created: 1990
- Party: CDU
- Member: Lukas Krieger
- Elected: 2025

Berlin-Charlottenburg-Wilmersdorf is an electoral constituency (German: Wahlkreis) represented in the Bundestag. It elects one member via first-past-the-post voting. Under the current constituency numbering system, it is designated as constituency 79. It is located in western Berlin, comprising the Charlottenburg-Wilmersdorf borough.

Berlin-Charlottenburg-Wilmersdorf was created for the inaugural 1990 federal election after German reunification. Since 2025, it has been represented by Lukas Krieger of the Christian Democratic Union (CDU).

== Geography ==
Berlin-Charlottenburg-Wilmersdorf is located in western Berlin. As of the 2021 federal election, it comprises the entirety of the Charlottenburg-Wilmersdorf borough excluding the area north of the Spree, specifically the locality of Charlottenburg-Nord and the neighbourhood of Kalowswerder from Charlottenburg locality.

== History ==
Berlin-Charlottenburg-Wilmersdorf was created after German reunification in 1990. In the 1990 through 1998 elections, it was constituency 254 in the numbering system. In the 2002 through 2009 elections, it was number 81. In the 2013 through 2021 elections, it was number 80. From the 2025 election, it has been number 79.

Originally, the constituency comprised the entirety of Charlottenburg-Wilmersdorf excluding the Charlottenburg-Nord locality. In the 2002 election, it lost the neighbourhood of Kalowswerder from Charlottenburg locality.

== Members ==
The constituency was first represented by Dietrich Mahlo of the Christian Democratic Union (CDU) from 1990 to 1998. It was won by the Social Democratic Party (SPD) in 1998 and represented by Siegrun Klemmer until 2002, followed by Petra-Evelyne Merkel until 2013. Klaus-Dieter Gröhler of the CDU was elected in 2013, and re-elected in 2017. Former Mayor of Berlin Michael Müller won the constituency for the SPD in 2021. Lukas Krieger regained it for the CDU in 2025.

Election	Member	Party	%
1990	Dietrich Mahlo	CDU	46.3
1994	Dietrich Mahlo	CDU	42.2
1998	Siegrun Klemmer	SPD	43.3
2002	Petra-Evelyne Merkel	SPD	41.7
2005	Petra-Evelyne Merkel	SPD	44.0
2009	Petra-Evelyne Merkel	SPD	32.0
2013	Klaus-Dieter Gröhler	CDU	37.1
2017	Klaus-Dieter Gröhler	CDU	30.2
2021	Michael Müller	SPD	27.9
2025	Lukas Krieger	CDU	26.3

== Election results ==
=== 2025 election ===
Federal election (2025): Berlin-Charlottenburg-Wilmersdorf
Notes:	Blue background denotes the winner of the electorate vote. Pink background denotes a candidate elected from their party list. Yellow background denotes an electorate win by a list member, or other incumbent. A ✓ or ✗ denotes status of any incumbent, win or lose respectively.						
Party	Candidate	Votes	%	±%	Party votes	%	±%
CDU	Lukas Krieger	42,273	26.3	▲1.2	37,332	23.1	▲1.1
Greens	Lisa Paus	38,681	24.0	▼1.1	35,122	21.7	▼5.0
SPD	✗ Michael Müller	38,187	23.7	▼1.9	28,929	17.9	▼4.0
Left	Niklas Schenker	17,861	11.1	▲5.5	23,469	14.5	▲8.0
AfD	Martin Kohler	13,870	8.6	▲3.3	14,329	8.9	▲2.8
FDP	Christoph Meyer	7,063	4.4	▼3.4	10,335	6.4	▼4.2
BSW					6,995	4.3	New
Volt					1,697	1.1	▲0.4
Tierschutzpartei					1,462	0.9	▼0.7
PARTEI	Yvonne Hoffmann	2,477	1.5	▲0.3	778	0.5	▼0.6
Team Todenhöfer					280	0.2	▼0.5
FW					260	0.2	▼0.4
BD	Paul Seifert	575	0.4	New	186	0.1	New
PdF					171	0.1	New
MERA25					151	0.1	New
MLPD					25	0.0	0.0
BüSo					23	0.0	0.0
SGP					14	0.0	0.0
Informal votes		1,300			729		
Total valid votes		160,987			161,558		
Turnout		162,287	83.0	▲14.9			
CDU gain from SPD	Majority	3,591	2.3				

=== 2021 election ===
Federal election (2021): Berlin-Charlottenburg-Wilmersdorf
Notes:	Blue background denotes the winner of the electorate vote. Pink background denotes a candidate elected from their party list. Yellow background denotes an electorate win by a list member, or other incumbent. A ✓ or ✗ denotes status of any incumbent, win or lose respectively.						
Party	Candidate	Votes	%	±%	Party votes	%	±%
SPD	Michael Müller	42,934	27.9	▲0.3	36,986	24.1	▲4.7
Greens	Lisa Paus	37,531	24.4	▲10.8	40,471	26.3	▲10.5
CDU	✗ Klaus-Dieter Gröhler	34,308	22.3	▼7.8	29,199	19.0	▼6.6
FDP	Christoph Meyer	14,982	9.7	▲0.5	20,183	13.1	▼1.7
Left	Michael Efler	8,802	5.7	▼3.7	9,947	6.5	▼5.3
AfD	Eva-Marie Doerfler	6,539	4.3	▼3.3	7,371	4.8	▼3.1
Tierschutzpartei	Henriette Spiering	2,423	1.6		2,323	1.5	▲0.6
PARTEI	Lennart Schwertfeger	1,858	1.2	▼0.9	1,560	1.0	▼0.3
dieBasis	Carolin Linge	1,752	1.1				
Team Todenhöfer					1,227	0.8	
Volt					1,175	0.8	
FW	Marcel Luthe	1,434	0.9		1,050	0.7	▲0.6
Die Grauen					752	0.5	▲0.2
Pirates	Therese Lehnen	549	0.4		425	0.3	▼0.2
Humanists	Barend Wolf	259	0.2		245	0.2	
ÖDP	Lars Clemens Arnold	221	0.1		194	0.1	0.0
Gesundheitsforschung					191	0.1	0.0
Independent	Norbert Voß	140	0.1				
du.					133	0.1	0.0
V-Partei3					79	0.1	▼0.1
DKP					77	0.1	0.0
LKR	Christian Schmidt	74	0.0		62	0.0	
NPD					46	0.0	
BüSo					40	0.0	0.0
SGP					26	0.0	0.0
MLPD					21	0.0	0.0
Informal votes		1,920			1,943		
Total valid votes		153,806			153,783		
Turnout		155,726	79.1	▼0.4			
SPD gain from CDU	Majority	5,403	3.5				

=== 2017 election ===
Federal election (2017): Berlin-Charlottenburg-Wilmersdorf
Notes:	Blue background denotes the winner of the electorate vote. Pink background denotes a candidate elected from their party list. Yellow background denotes an electorate win by a list member, or other incumbent. A ✓ or ✗ denotes status of any incumbent, win or lose respectively.						
Party	Candidate	Votes	%	±%	Party votes	%	±%
CDU	✓ Klaus-Dieter Gröhler	47,077	30.2	▼6.9	40,085	25.6	▼6.9
SPD	Tim Renner	43,123	27.6	▼3.8	30,351	19.4	▼7.7
Greens	Lisa Paus	21,286	13.6	▼1.0	24,770	15.8	▲0.4
Left	Friederike Benda	14,745	9.4	▲3.3	18,367	11.7	▲2.9
FDP	Christoph Meyer	14,426	9.2	▲6.7	23,280	14.9	▲8.0
AfD	Nicolaus Fest	11,722	7.5	▲3.8	12,374	7.9	▲3.1
PARTEI	Lothar Blickensdorf	3,292	2.1	▲1.4	2,110	1.3	▲0.7
Tierschutzpartei					1,490	1.0	
Pirates					693	0.4	▼2.1
Die Grauen					454	0.3	
BGE					443	0.3	
DiB					442	0.3	
DM					264	0.2	
ÖDP					222	0.1	0.0
V-Partei³					221	0.1	
FW					203	0.1	▼0.2
du.					200	0.1	
Gesundheitsforschung					200	0.1	
Menschliche Welt					199	0.1	
BüSo	Jonathan Thron	443	0.3	▲0.2	108	0.1	0.0
MLPD					74	0.0	0.0
DKP					46	0.0	
B*					31	0.0	
SGP					20	0.0	0.0
Informal votes		1,920			1,387		
Total valid votes		156,114			156,647		
Turnout		158,034	79.5	▲2.0			
CDU hold	Majority	3,954	2.6	▼3.0			

=== 2013 election ===
Federal election (2013): Berlin-Charlottenburg-Wilmersdorf
Notes:	Blue background denotes the winner of the electorate vote. Pink background denotes a candidate elected from their party list. Yellow background denotes an electorate win by a list member, or other incumbent. A ✓ or ✗ denotes status of any incumbent, win or lose respectively.						
Party	Candidate	Votes	%	±%	Party votes	%	±%
CDU	Klaus-Dieter Gröhler	56,079	37.1	▲6.9	49,285	32.5	▲6.0
SPD	Ülker Radziwill	47,619	31.5	▼0.6	41,058	27.1	▲5.7
Greens	Lisa Paus	22,176	14.7	▼3.5	23,324	15.4	▼6.7
Left	Marlene Cieschinger	9,368	6.2	▼0.6	13,446	8.9	▲0.2
AfD	Hugh Bronson	5,649	3.7		7,276	4.8	
FDP	Lars Lindemann	3,801	2.5	▼8.6	10,347	6.8	▼9.6
Pirates	Siegfried Schlosser	3,657	2.4		3,872	2.6	▲0.2
PARTEI	Carl Willke	1,057	0.7		976	0.6	
NPD	Jens Pühse	754	0.5	▼0.3	639	0.4	▼0.2
FW		478	0.3		457	0.3	
ÖDP					242	0.2	0.0
PRO					220	0.1	
BIG		227	0.1		205	0.1	
Independent	Fricke	204	0.1				
BüSo		181	0.1	▼0.5	120	0.1	▼0.1
REP					114	0.1	▼0.1
RRP		84	0.1				
MLPD					45	0.0	0.0
PSG					39	0.0	0.0
Informal votes		2,086			1,755		
Total valid votes		151,334			151,665		
Turnout		153,420	77.6	▲0.8			
CDU gain from SPD	Majority	8,460	5.6				

=== 2009 election ===
Federal election (2009): Berlin-Charlottenburg-Wilmersdorf
Notes:	Blue background denotes the winner of the electorate vote. Pink background denotes a candidate elected from their party list. Yellow background denotes an electorate win by a list member, or other incumbent. A ✓ or ✗ denotes status of any incumbent, win or lose respectively.						
Party	Candidate	Votes	%	±%	Party votes	%	±%
SPD	✓ Petra-Evelyne Merkel	47,340	32.0	▼11.9	31,719	21.4	▼10.6
CDU	Ingo Schmitt	44,549	30.2	▼3.4	39,331	26.5	▼0.8
Greens	Lisa Paus	26,778	18.1	▲7.1	32,724	22.1	▲2.6
FDP	Peter Schantz	16,397	11.1	▲5.6	24,313	16.4	▲4.0
Left	Hans-Ulrich Riedel	9,978	6.8	▲2.2	12,868	8.7	▲2.8
Pirates					3,564	2.4	
Tierschutzpartei					1,518	1.0	
NPD	Bettina Bieder	1,187	0.8	0.0	893	0.6	0.0
DIE VIOLETTEN					465	0.3	
BüSo	Anna-Maria Hildebrand	912	0.6	▲0.1	265	0.2	0.0
Independent	Rudolf Dettweiler	331	0.2				
REP					262	0.2	▼0.1
Independent	Herbert Polei	261	0.2				
ÖDP					243	0.2	
DVU					88	0.1	
PSG					53	0.0	0.0
DKP					45	0.0	
MLPD					34	0.0	0.0
Informal votes		2,623			1,971		
Total valid votes		147,733			148,385		
Turnout		150,356	76.8	▼3.9			
SPD hold	Majority	2,791	1.8	▼8.6			

=== 2005 election ===
Federal election (2005):Berlin-Charlottenburg-Wilmersdorf
Notes:	Blue background denotes the winner of the electorate vote. Pink background denotes a candidate elected from their party list. Yellow background denotes an electorate win by a list member, or other incumbent. A ✓ or ✗ denotes status of any incumbent, win or lose respectively.						
Party	Candidate	Votes	%	±%	Party votes	%	±%
SPD	✓ Petra-Evelyne Merkel	68,625	44.0	▲2.2	50,168	32.0	▼0.8
CDU	Ingo Schmitt	52,408	33.6	▲2.3	42,736	27.3	▼3.0
Greens	Elfi Jantzen	17,273	11.1	▼3.1	30,468	19.4	▼3.1
FDP	Jürgen Schick	8,591	5.5	▼3.8	19,341	12.3	▲3.3
Left	Natalie Rottka	7,042	4.5	▲2.5	9,152	5.8	▲3.5
GRAUEN					2,377	1.5	▲0.8
NPD	Andreas Storr	1,298	0.8		980	0.6	▲0.5
BüSo	Frank Hahn	857	0.5	▲0.3	231	0.1	▲0.1
PARTEI					382	0.2	
REP					381	0.2	▼0.1
Feminist					344	0.2	0.0
APPD					101	0.1	
SGP					60	0.0	
MLPD					39	0.0	
Informal votes		2,771			2,105		
Total valid votes		156,094			156,760		
Turnout		158,865	80.7	▼1.5			
SPD hold	Majority	16,217	10.4				
