= Budget Committee (Germany) =

In the Federal Republic of Germany, the federal parliament (Bundestag) and all state parliaments (Landtage) have established Budget Committees (Haushaltsausschuss), standing parliamentary committees generally responsible for deliberations on the budget act and for parliamentary oversight of budget execution.

If no separate Finance Committee is established, it also deals with fiscal policy issues such as tax policy, financial regulation, and customs matters. Some budget committees are therefore designated as "Finance Committee", as in Baden-Württemberg, or "Budget and Finance Committee", as in North Rhine-Westphalia. In the Abgeordnetenhaus of Berlin, the Budget Committee corresponds to the Hauptausschuss (Main Committee). In the Bundesrat, the Finance Committee performs the functions of the Budget Committee.

== Budget Committee of the Bundestag ==
The Budget Committee of the Bundestag deliberates on the annual budget process. Furthermore, it continuously monitors the budget execution of the federal government and the financial assistance within the framework of European Stability Mechanism. According to parliamentary custom, the chairmanship of the Budget Committee was, until the 21st Bundestag always held by a member of the largest opposition parliamentary group (in the 21st Bundestag, the rule was broken in order to exclude Alternative for Germany). The Budget Committee is not responsible for tax policy, financial market regulation, or customs matters (these areas are handled by the Finance Committee of the Bundestag).

The committee chairman in the 20th legislative period was CDU Member of Parliament Helge Braun. The main task of this committee is the deliberation of the Federal Budget Act. For this purpose, rapporteurs are appointed who examine the budget plans of each individual ministry, known as individual plans (Einzelpläne). Their findings serve as the basis for further committee deliberations. For each individual plan, the Budget Committee issues a separate recommendation for a resolution.

The Budget Committee begins its work on the federal budget after the draft budget proposed by the federal government has been referred to it, and after deliberation with a general debate and concluding debate in the first reading by the plenary session of the Bundestag. First, all individual plans are reviewed and, if necessary, amended in rapporteur discussions involving the respective ministry, representatives of the Federal Ministry of Finance, and the federal auditors. After the committee deliberations, all individual plans are finalized in a major Bereinigungssitzung (final review session) and compiled into the final draft budget for the parliament. Some members of the Bundestag's Budget Committee form the Confidential Committee (Vertrauensgremium) for the approval of the secret economic plans of the federal intelligence services of Germany (BND, BfV, MAD).

=== Chairpersons of the Budget Committee ===
- 1949–1969 Erwin Schoettle (SPD)
- 1969–1977 Albert Leicht (CDU)
- 1977–1981 Heinrich Windelen (CDU)
- 1981–1982 Lothar Haase (CDU)
- 1982–1983 Helmut Esters (SPD)
- 1983–1994 Rudi Walther (SPD)
- 1994–1998 Helmut Wieczorek (SPD)
- 1998–2002 Adolf Roth (CDU)
- 2002–2005 Manfred Carstens (CDU)
- 2005–2009 Otto Fricke (FDP)
- 2009–2013 Petra Merkel (SPD)
- 2014–2017 Gesine Lötzsch (The Left Party)
- 2018–2021 Peter Boehringer (AfD)
- since 2021 Helge Braun (CDU)

=== History ===
From 1965 until at least 1987, the spy Inge Wucyna supplied information from the Budget Committee to the Ministry for State Security (Stasi) of the GDR.

== Sources ==
- Villamor, Javier (2025-05-21). "Germany's Ruling Parties Freeze AfD Out of Parliamentary Power". The European Conservative.
