= Lukas Krieger =

German politician (born 1987)

Lukas Krieger MdB

Member of the Bundestag; for Berlin-Charlottenburg-Wilmersdorf
- Incumbent
- Assumed office 25 March 2025
- Preceded by: Michael Müller

Personal details
- Born: 11 November 1987 (age 38) Weingarten, Württemberg, West Germany
- Party: Christian Democratic Union
- Education: Free University of Berlin

Lukas Krieger (born 11 November 1987) is a German lawyer and politician of the Christian Democratic Union (CDU) who has been serving as a member of the Bundestag since 2025, representing the Berlin-Charlottenburg-Wilmersdorf district.

== Political career ==
From 2006 to 2008, Krieger served as chairman of the Schüler Union Deutschlands.

In parliament, Krieger has been serving on the Finance Committee. As an alternate member of the Budget Committee, he is his parliamentary group's rapporteur on the annual budget of the Federal Constitutional Court.
