= Achim Post =

German politician (born 1959)

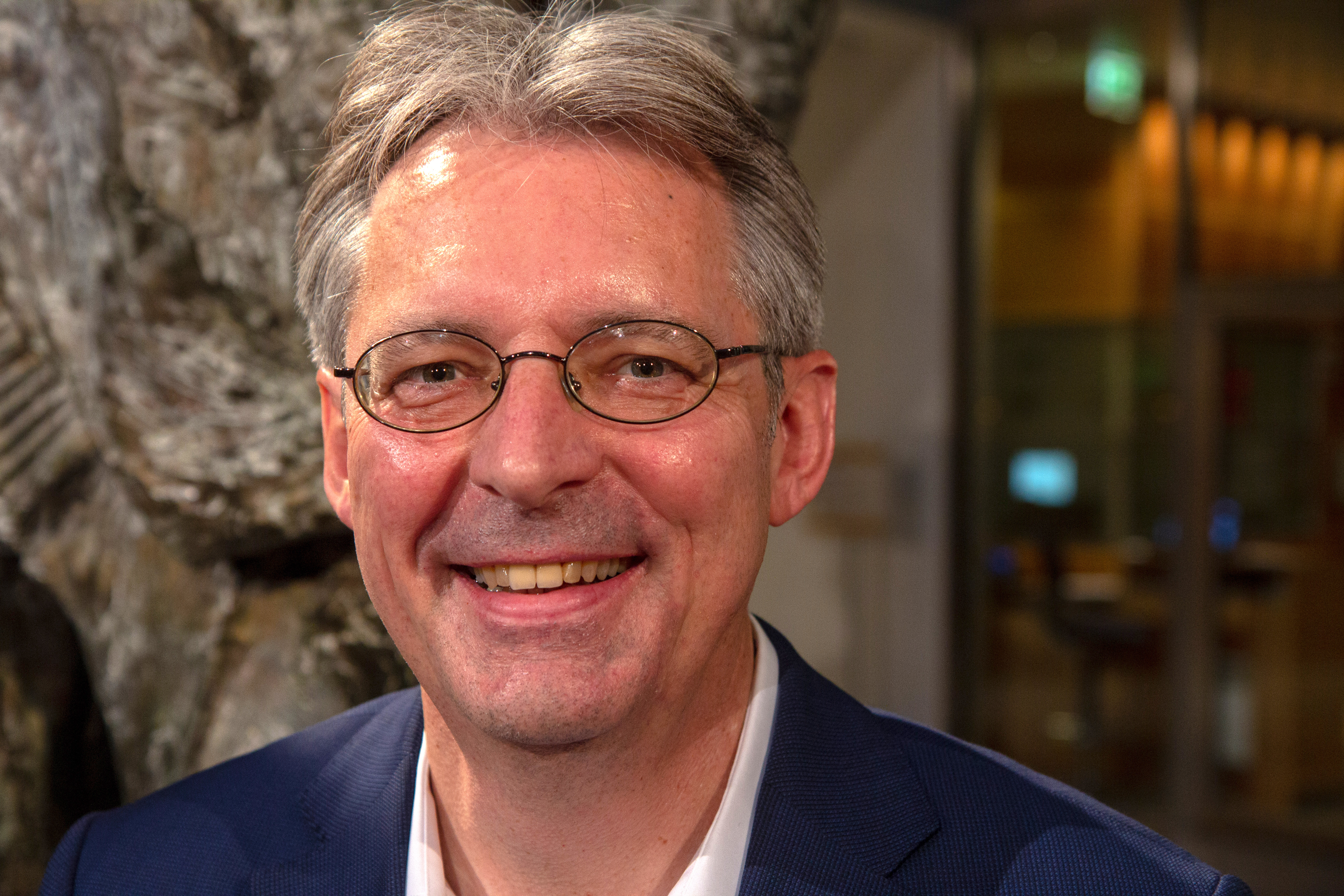
- Post in 2018

Member of the Bundestag
- In office 2013–2025

Personal details
- Born: 2 May 1959 (age 67) Rahden, West Germany (now Germany)
- Party: SPD
- Education: Bielefeld University

Achim Post (born 2 May 1959) is a German politician of the Social Democratic Party (SPD) who served as a member of the Bundestag from the state of North Rhine-Westphalia from 2013 to 2025. Since 2023 he has been the co-chairman of his NRW state association within the SPD.

== Political career ==
Post became a member of the Bundestag in the 2013 German federal election. In parliament, he was a member of the Joint Committee.

From 2015 to 2023, Post led the Bundestag group of SPD parliamentarians from North Rhine-Westphalia, the largest delegation within the party's parliamentary group. From 2017, he served as one his parliamentary group's chairpersons, under the leadership of successive chairs Andrea Nahles (2017–2018) and Rolf Mützenich (2018–2025).

In addition to his committee assignments, Post was part of the German-Egyptian Parliamentary Friendship Group.

In the negotiations to form a so-called traffic light coalition of the SPD, the Green Party and the Free Democratic Party (FDP) following the 2021 federal elections, Post was part of his party's delegation in the working group on financial regulation and the national budget, co-chaired by Doris Ahnen, Lisa Paus and Christian Dürr.

In September 2024, Post announced that he would not stand in the 2025 federal elections but instead resign from active politics by the end of the parliamentary term.

== Other activities ==
- KfW, Member of the Board of Supervisory Directors (2022–2025)
- Business Forum of the Social Democratic Party of Germany, Member of the Political Advisory Board (since 2020)
