= Tine Wittler =

German writer, TV presenter and actress (born 1973)

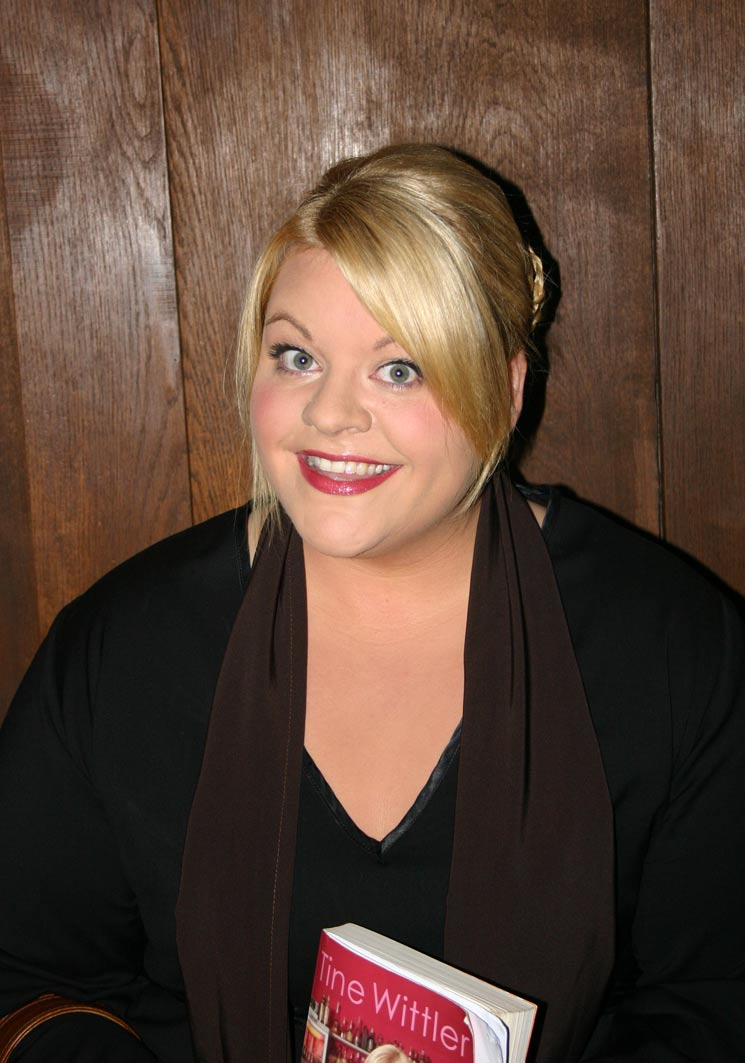
- Tine Wittler, 2007
- Born: 2 April 1973; Rahden, West Germany
- Website: www.prallewelt.com

Christine "Tine" Wittler (born 2 April 1973 in Rahden) is a German writer, TV presenter and actress.

After studying in Lüneburg and Glamorgan (now the University of South Wales), Wittler worked as a freelance writer for NDR and presented the German television programme Bravo TV.

Since 1995, Wittler has been a resident of Hamburg-Ottensen, where she runs her own web store for plus-size clothing, prallewelt (since 2006). The fashion label was renamed to kingsizequeens in 2013 and has been passed to her co-owner.

Wittler presented the RTL show Einsatz in 4 Wänden from 2003 to 2013.
