= Petra Merkel =

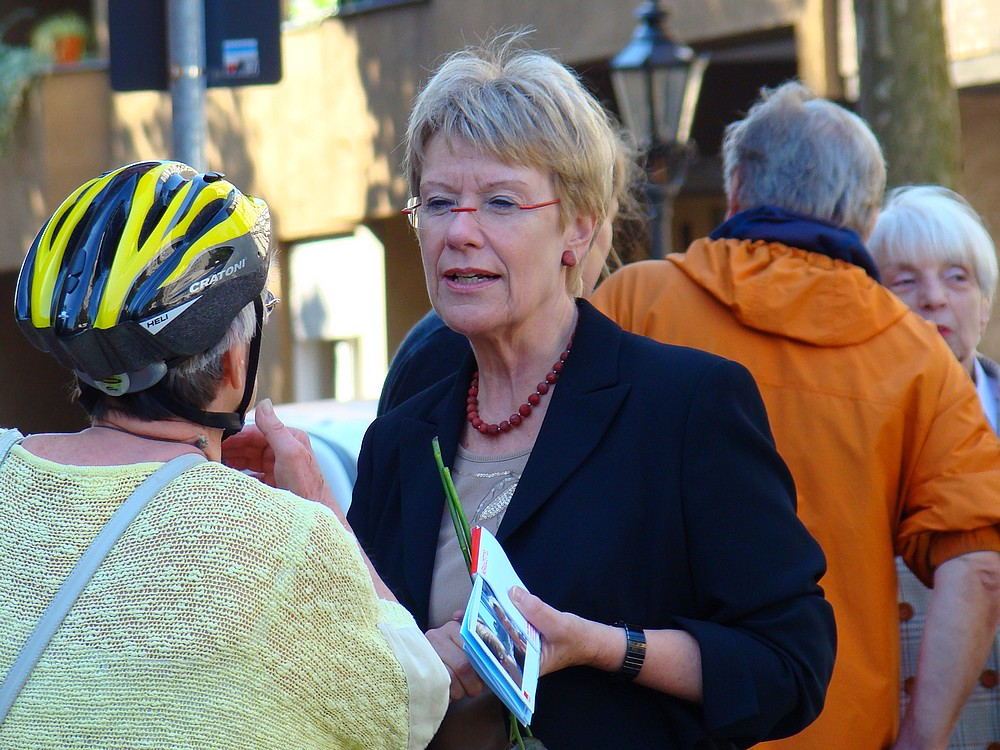
- Merkel in 2008

Member of the Bundestag; for Berlin-Charlottenburg-Wilmersdorf
- In office 17 October 2002 – 22 October 2013
- Preceded by: Siegrun Klemmer
- Succeeded by: Klaus-Dieter Gröhler

Member of the; Berlin House of Representatives
- In office 16 March 1989 – October 2001
- Preceded by: Rolf Wiedenhaupt
- Succeeded by: Constituency abolished
- Constituency: Charlottenburg 2 (1989–1990); Charlottenburg (1990–2001)

Personal details
- Born: Petra-Evelyne Schwoob; 18 September 1947 (age 78) Berlin, Germany
- Party: Social Democratic
- Children: 1
- Education: Lette-Verein

Petra-Evelyne Merkel (née Schwoob; born 18 September 1947) is a former German politician from the Social Democratic Party of Germany (SPD).

== Early life and career ==
After completing her secondary education, Petra Merkel attended the commercial vocational school of the Lette-Verein in Berlin and worked as a commercial employee from 1966 to 1969 and again from 1979 onwards.

Since the early 1970s, Petra Merkel founded a parent-child group in Charlottenburg-Nord at the former youth center on Halemweg. Later, she became involved as a parent representative at the Erwin-von-Witzleben Elementary School and subsequently at the Carl-Friedrich-von-Siemens-Gymnasium.

== Political career ==
Merkel has been a member of the SPD since 1974.

From 1981 to 1989, Petra Merkel was a member of the district assembly of Berlin-Charlottenburg, and from 1989 to 2001, a member of the Abgeordnetenhaus of Berlin. There, she was deputy chairwoman of the SPD parliamentary group from 1994 to 1995 and parliamentary managing director from 1995 to 2001.

From 2002 to 2013, she was a member of the German Bundestag. There, she served as deputy spokesperson for the Berlin regional group within the SPD parliamentary group from 2002. From the end of 2005, she also served as deputy spokesperson for the parliamentary group's working group on the budget and was a member of the parliamentary group's executive committee. From 2009 to 2013, she chaired the Bundestag's Budget Committee.

Petra Merkel was directly elected to the Bundestag in the Berlin-Charlottenburg-Wilmersdorf constituency from 2002 to 2013. In the 2009 election, she received 32.0% of the first-preference votes there; she did not run again in 2013.

== Other activities ==
Petra Merkel has been involved with the International Federation since the early 1990s. She started in Berlin at the training hotel on Kurfürstendamm, and later joined the IB Berlin office in Reinickendorf, located on Aroser Allee. In 2007, she became a member of the International Federation's executive board. In 2013, Petra Merkel was elected honorary president of the Internationaler Bund, a position she still holds today.

In 2002, Petra Merkel became a member of the European Academy Berlin and remains on the board of the association to this day.

She has been President of the Berlin Choral Association since 2009, a member of the Presidium of the German Choral Association (Deutscher Chorverband) since 2011, and Vice President of the German Choral Association since 2008.

In November 2015, Petra Merkel founded Begegnungschor e. V. with the Chorverband Berlin and has been treasurer ever since.

Petra Merkel has been a member of the board of trustees of the Society for Christian-Jewish Cooperation in Berlin for several years .

Since 2022, Petra Merkel has been a member of the University Council of Mediadesign Hochschule.

A particularly significant event for Petra Merkel was the suggestion in 2012 to lay a Stolperstein (memorial plaque) for Paula Dienstag at Goethestraße 15, in front of a daycare center. By a stroke of luck, she got in touch with Yuval Doron, Paula Dienstag's grandson.

== Personal life ==
Petra Merkel is Protestant, divorced, and has one daughter.

== Awards ==
- 2009 Wilhelm-Naulin-Plakette für Verdienste zum Erhalt, zur Sicherung und Förderung des Kleingartenwesens
- 2015 Bundesverdienstkreuz am Bande
- 2024 Paritätische Ehrennadel in Silber des Paritätischen Wohlfahrtsverbands Berlin
- 2024 50 Jahre SPD-Mitgliedschaft
- 2024 Stadtältester von Berlin

== Literature ==
- Werner Breunig, Andreas Herbst (Hrsg.): Biografisches Handbuch der Berliner Abgeordneten 1963–1995 und Stadtverordneten 1990/1991 (= Schriftenreihe des Landesarchivs Berlin. Band 19). Landesarchiv Berlin, Berlin 2016, ISBN 978-3-9803303-5-0, S. 260.
