= Rahden =

- Town
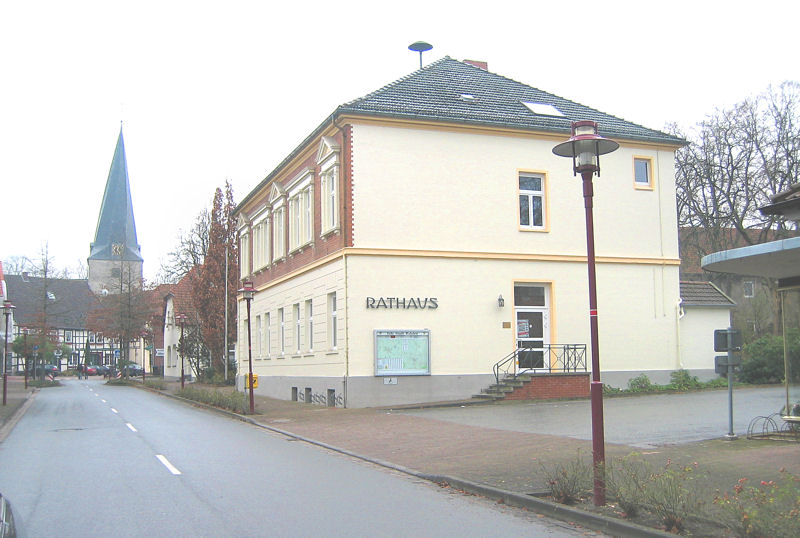

- Flag Coat of arms

- Location of Rahden within Minden-Lübbecke district
- Interactive map of Rahden
- Location within Germany Location within North Rhine-Westphalia
- Coordinates: 52°25′N 8°37′E
- Country: Germany
- State: North Rhine-Westphalia
- Admin. region: Detmold
- District: Minden-Lübbecke
- Subdivisions: 7

Government
  - Mayor (2025–30): Florian Haase (FDP)

Area
  - Total: 137.48 km^{2} (53.08 sq mi)
- Elevation: 39 m (128 ft)

Population (2025-12-31)
  - Total: 16,128
  - Density: 117.31/km^{2} (303.84/sq mi)
- Time zone: UTC+01:00 (CET)
  - Summer (DST): UTC+02:00 (CEST)
- Postal codes: 32369
- Dialling codes: 05771
- Vehicle registration: MI
- Website: www.rahden.de

Rahden (German pronunciation: [ˈʁaːdn̩]; Low German: Roh'n) is a town in the far north of North Rhine-Westphalia between Bielefeld and Bremen and between Hanover and Osnabrück. Rahden is part of the Minden-Lübbecke District in East Westphalia-Lippe.

Rahden was first mentioned in 1033, and from 1816 to 1831 was county town of the district Rahden.

== Geography ==
Rahden is situated approximately 15 kilometres (9.3 mi) north of Lübbecke and 25 kilometres (16 mi) north-west of Minden. It is the northernmost town of North Rhine-Westphalia.

=== Town subdivisions ===
Rahden districts

The town of Rahden consists of 7 districts:

- Rahden (4,689 inhabitants)
- Kleinendorf (4,242 inhabitants)
- Varl (1,676 inhabitants)
- Sielhorst (791 inhabitants)
- Preußisch Ströhen (2,075 inhabitants)
- Wehe (1,730 inhabitants)
- Tonnenheide (1,784 inhabitants)

== Population ==
Historical population

Year	Pop.	±% p.a.
1965	13,619	—
1970	13,828	+0.31%
1975	13,545	−0.41%
1980	13,231	−0.47%
1985	12,984	−0.38%
1990	14,109	+1.68%
1995	14,850	+1.03%

Year	Pop.	±% p.a.
2000	15,766	+1.20%
2005	16,079	+0.39%
2010	15,636	−0.56%
2015	15,581	−0.07%
2020	15,404	−0.23%
2025	16,128	+0.92%

Source: Landesdatabank Nordrhein-Westfalen

== Mayors ==
Bert Honsel (CDU) was elected mayor in September 2015 with 61.1% of the votes.

Term of office	Mayor
1973–1985	Reinhold Spönemann (CDU)
1985–1999	Wilhelm Möhring (CDU)
1999–2015	Bernd Hachmann (CDU)
since 2015	Bert Honsel (CDU)

== International relations ==
Rahden is twinned with:

- Glindow (Berlin, Germany) -- since 1990
- Galgahévíz (Hungary) -- since 1995

== Notable people ==
- Achim Post (born 1959), German politician
- Tine Wittler (born 1973), German writer and television presenter

=== Honorary citizen ===
The only honorary citizen of Rahden is Professor Carl Langhorst (d. 1950 Rahden). He was born in 1867 in the Great Village and was a prominent portrait painter, poet and the composer of the "New Westphalia March." A street in downtown Rahden is named after him.

=== Sons and daughters of the town ===
The individuals listed here come from the city Rahden and have both regional, national or even international importance. Here, the list is not exhaustive.

(As far as possible, rather than the flat giving Rahden the origin of the respective municipality or later noted the district. By screenability each column is not just a last name in alphabetical order, but it can also be found quickly anniversary dates.)

Name	born	in	died	in	note
Christine von Halle	1533	Rahden	1603	Breitenburg	Wife of Heinrich Rantzau
Robert Portner	1837	Rahden	1906	Manassas, VA, USA	Brewer and inventor
Carl Langhorst	1867	Rahden	1950		Painter and composer
Christian Rosenbohm	1878	Rahden	1948	Lübbecke	Member of the Landtag NRW, County Council Member for Westphalia
Friedhelm Ortgies	1950	Rahden			Member of the NRW state parliament
Wilhelm Priesmeier	1954	Rahden			Member of the Bundestag
Andreas Brandhorst	1956	Rahden			Fantasy- and Science-Fiction-author and translator
Heinrich Bretthorst	1883	Rahden	1962	Leipzig	politician(SPD/SED)
Benny (Benny Schnier)	1957	Rahden			Radio and television presenter and singer
Kurt Bock	1958	Rahden			Chairman of BASF
Achim Post	1959	Rahden			Deputy federal secretary of the SPD, a member of the Bundestag
Michael Buhre	1961	Rahden			Mayor of Minden
Dietmar Kolbus	1966	Rahden			chess players
Jens-Hermann Kleine	1972	Rahden			Director of Office Unterspreewald, Brandenburg
Chris Bollenbach	1972	Rahden			Was a member of the NRW state parliament
Friedrich Schepsmeier	1949	Rahden			Was a member of the NRW state parliament
Tine Wittler	1973	Rahden			Writer and television presenter (for use in homes, RTL)
Lars Windhorst	1976	Rahden			Entrepreneurial wunderkind of the 90
Stefan Wessels	1979	Rahden			Keeper, played from 1998 till 2003 at FC Bayern München
