= Einsatz in 4 Wänden =

- Genre: Lifestyle
- Presented by: Tine Wittler
- Country of origin: Germany
- Original language: German

Production
- Executive producer: Gilbert Funke
- Production companies: MME Me, Myself & Eye Entertainment GmbH

Original release
- Network: RTL
- Release: 13 October 2003 – 2013

Related
- Changing Rooms

Einsatz in 4 Wänden is a home renovation show broadcast in Germany on RTL since 2003 and presented by Tine Wittler.

The show relies heavily on product placement by the Swedish retailer IKEA. After the success of the daytime show, RTL launched the prime time version Einsatz in 4 Wänden Spezial - renovating whole houses instead of rooms. Wittler, now more involved in the production of primetime episodes started to alternate with less known and less popular co-presenter Almuth Kook of the daytime show in 2006. In 2009 the concept of the prime time show was changed, extensively presenting compulsive hoarders and their homes before starting to renovate. Reruns of the show now air on RTLplus in Germany.
