= Schahina Gambir =

German politician (born 1991)

Member of the Bundestag
- Incumbent
- Assumed office 26 October 2021
- Constituency: North Rhine-Westphalia

Personal details
- Born: 6 June 1991 (age 35) Kabul, Afghanistan
- Party: Alliance 90/The Greens
- Education: Bielefeld University

Schahina Gambir (born 6 June 1991) is a German politician of Alliance 90/The Greens who has been serving as a member of the Bundestag since the 2021 elections, representing the Minden-Lübbecke I district.

== Political career ==
During her first term in parliament from 2021 to 2025, Gambir was a member of the Committee on Family Affairs, Senior Citizens, Women and Youth and of a study commission set up to investigate the entire period of German involvement in Afghanistan from 2001 to 2021 and to draw lessons for foreign and security policy in future. Since 2025, she has been a member of the Committee on Economic Cooperation and Development and the Committee on Internal Affairs.

== Other activities ==
- German Institute for Development Evaluation (DEval), Member of the Advisory Board (since 2025)
