= Lisa Paus =

German politician (born 1968)

Lisa Paus MdB
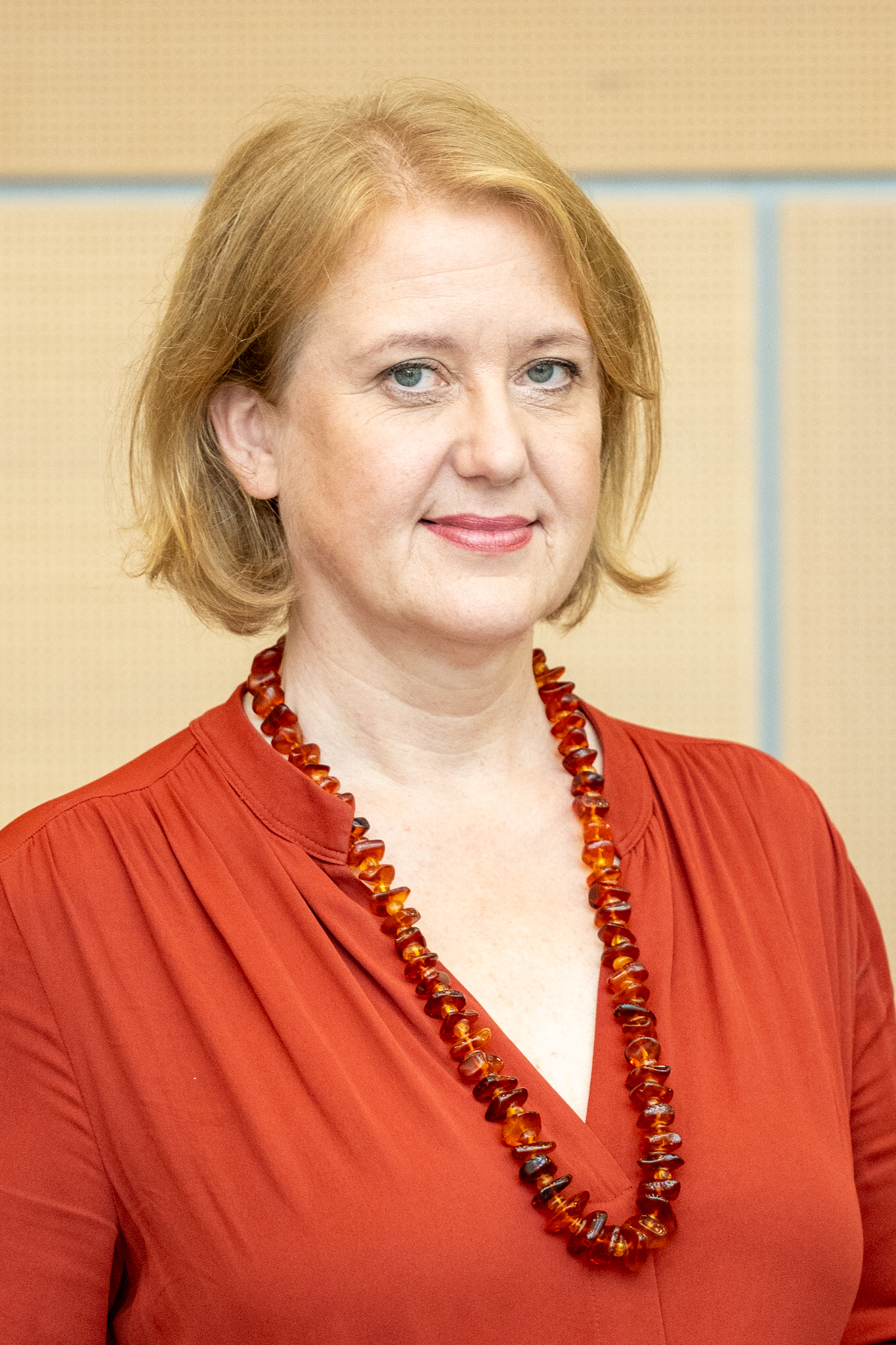
- Paus in 2022

Minister for Family Affairs, Senior Citizens, Women and Youth
- In office 25 April 2022 – 6 May 2025
- Chancellor: Olaf Scholz
- Preceded by: Anne Spiegel
- Succeeded by: Karin Prien

Member of the Bundestag
- Incumbent
- Assumed office 27 October 2009
- Constituency: Berlin

Personal details
- Born: 19 September 1968 (age 58) Rheine, West Germany (now Germany)
- Party: Alliance 90/The Greens
- Children: 1
- Education: Free University of Berlin

Elisabeth "Lisa" Paus (born 19 September 1968) is a German politician who served as the Federal Minister for Family Affairs, Senior Citizens, Women and Youth from 2022 to 2025. A member of Alliance 90/The Greens and an economist by training, she has served as a Member of the German Bundestag for the state of Berlin since 2009.

== Early life and education ==
Paus was born in Rheine, West Germany, and grew up in nearby Emsbüren, close to the Dutch border. She grew up in an affluent family; her father, the engineer Hermann Paus, founded and owned the Hermann Paus Maschinenfabrik, a company with around 300 employees that produces special-purpose machines and vehicles for the mining industry. The name Paus means pope, originating as a Middle Low German nickname for someone renowned for their piety, and is found in northern Germany, the Netherlands and Scandinavia; her family is unrelated to the famous literary family of the name.

She completed her Abitur at Emsland Gymnasium, and volunteered for one year at an orphanage in Hamburg. She then moved to Berlin to study at the Free University. She graduated in 1999 with a master's degree in economics.

From 1997 until 1999, Paus worked for Frieder Otto Wolf who was a Member of the European Parliament (MEP) for Germany's Green Party. In 2005 she became a teacher at the Berlin School of Economics and Law.

== Political career ==
=== Career in state politics ===
In 1995, Paus joined Germany's Green Party, Alliance 90/The Greens. She was involved in the party in various forms. In the 1999 state election, she was elected to the State Parliament of Berlin (Abgeordnetenhaus). There she was her parliamentary group's spokesperson on economic policy.

=== Member of the German Parliament, 2009–present ===
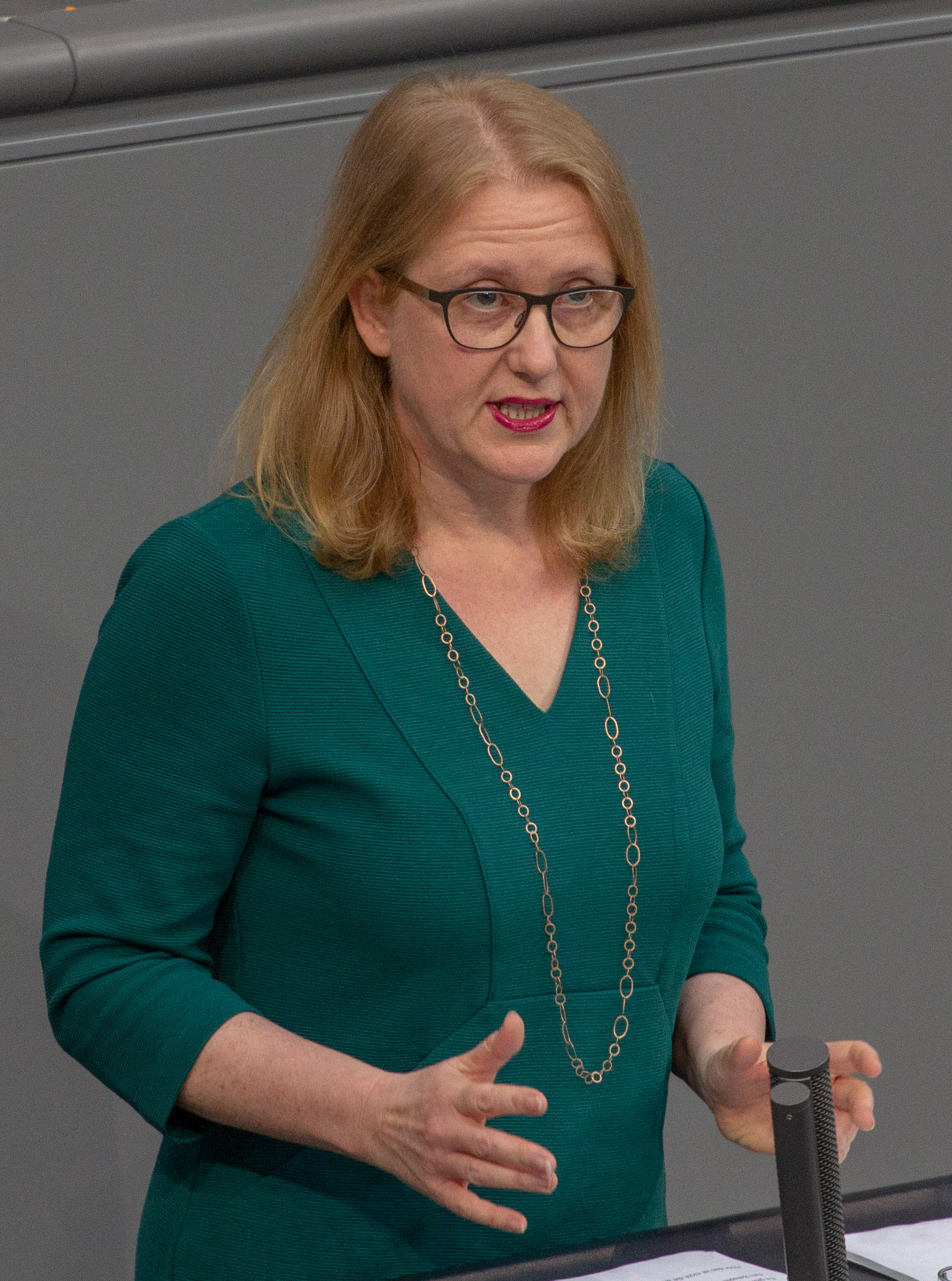
Paus in 2019

Paus has been a Member of the German Bundestag since the 2009 federal elections. She has stood in Berlin-Charlottenburg-Wilmersdorf in 2013, 2017 and 2021. She is a member of the Finance Committee and within the committee she is the Green's spokesperson. In her first term between 2009 and 2013, she also served on the Committee on the Affairs of the European Union.

On the Finance Committee, Paus was involved in the parliamentary inquiry into the Wirecard scandal from 2020 until 2021; following the inquiry's completion, she co-authored a 675-page report together with Florian Toncar and Fabio De Masi.

In addition to her committee assignments, Paus has served as deputy chairwoman of the German-Irish Parliamentary Friendship Group (since 2014) and of the Parliamentary Friendship Group for Relations with Malta and Cyprus (since 2018). She is also a member of the German-Italian Parliamentary Friendship Group and the German-Slovenian Parliamentary Group.

Ahead of the national elections in 2017 and 2021, Paus was elected to lead her party's campaign in the state of Berlin.

In the negotiations to form a so-called traffic light coalition of the Social Democrats (SPD), the Green Party and the FDP following the 2021 federal elections, Paus led her party's delegation in the working group on financial regulation and the national budget; her co-chairs from the other parties were Doris Ahnen and Christian Dürr.

From December 2021 to April 2022, Paus served as one her parliamentary group's deputy chairs, under the leadership of co-chairs Britta Haßelmann and Katharina Dröge, where she oversaw the group's activities on financial policy, economic and social affairs.

In the negotiations to form a coalition government in Berlin under the prospective leadership of Elif Eralp following the 2026 state elections, Paus was a member of her party’s delegation in the working group on science, research and higher education.

=== Minister for Family Affairs, Senior Citizens, Women and Youth, 2022–2025 ===
In 2022, Paus succeeded Anne Spiegel as Minister for Family Affairs, Senior Citizens, Women and Youth in the coalition government led by Chancellor Olaf Scholz.

In August 2023, Paus made news headlines when she rejected the coalition government's proposal for a law offering wider corporate tax relief worth billions of euros aimed at reviving growth in Germany's economy and instead suggested to raise spending on child support in tandem with giving more tax benefit to companies. Shortly after, the coalition government agreed on a new basic child benefit allowance at an initial cost of around 2.4 billion euros ($2.6 billion) from 2025.

In October 2023, Paus participated in the first joint cabinet retreat of the German and French governments in Hamburg, chaired by Scholz and President Emmanuel Macron.

== Other activities ==
- German Foundation for Active Citizenship and Volunteering (DSEE), Ex-Officio Member of the Board of Trustees (since 2022)
- Total E-Quality initiative, Member of the Board of Trustees (since 2022)
- Forum Ökologisch-Soziale Marktwirtschaft (FÖS), Member of the Advisory Board
- Association for the Taxation of Financial Transactions and for Citizens' Action (ATTAC), Member

== Personal life ==
In 2009, Paus had her first child. The child's father died of cancer in 2013.
