= Friedhelm Ortgies =

German politician

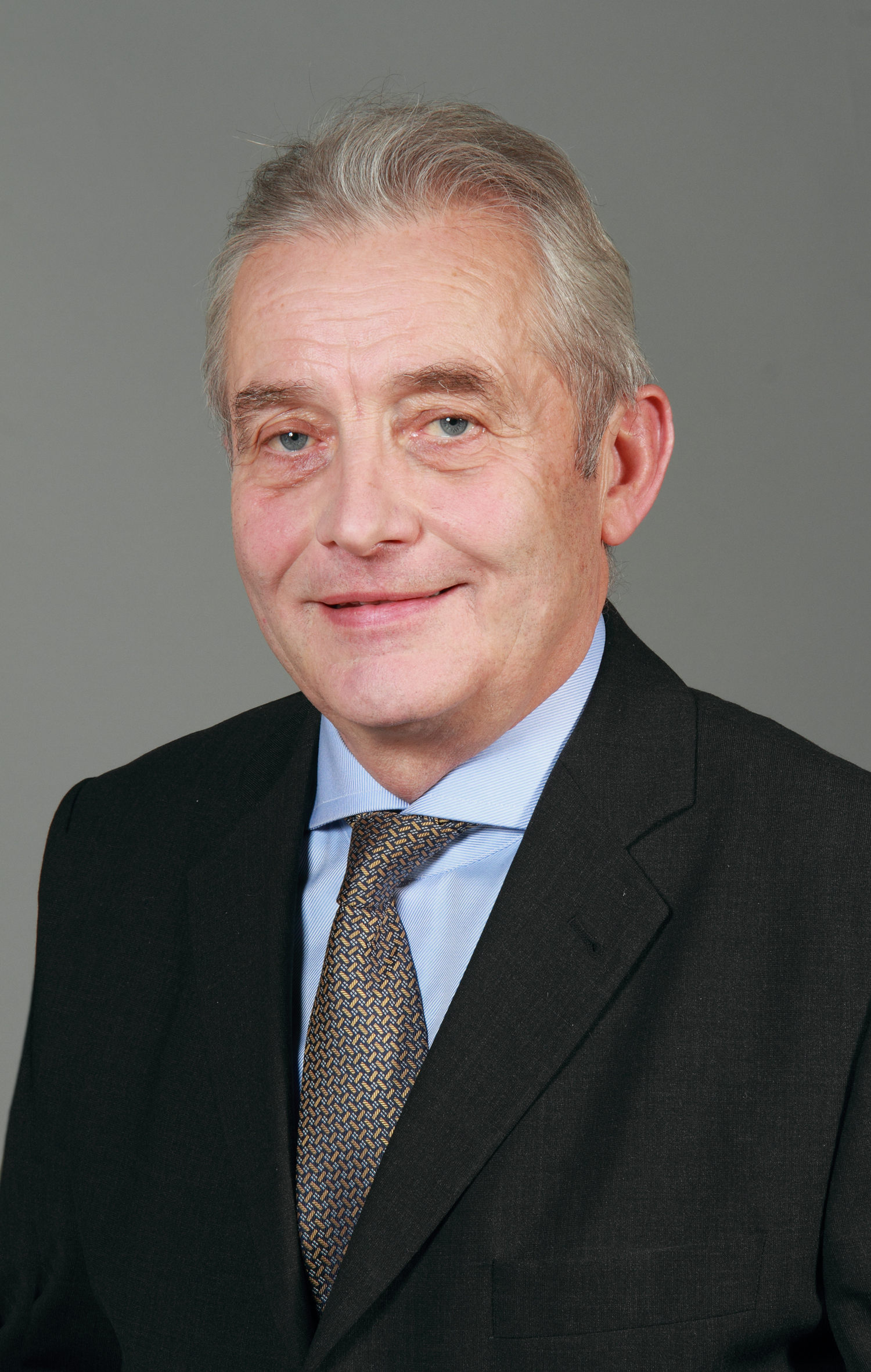
Friedhelm Ortgies

Friedhelm Henry Ortgies (born 12 May 1950 in Rahden) is a German politician in the Christian Democratic Union of Germany (CDU).

== Education and Work ==
In 1965 Ortgies began attendance at an Agricultural secondary school in Rahden. After Graduation, Ortgies attended an agricultural college where he obtained his master's certificate in 1974 as an agriculturalist. A year later, he took over his parents' farm (primarily based around pig rearing and processing), which he managed until 2000, at which point he entered the Parliament of North Rhine-Westphalia.

== Family ==
Friedhelm Ortgies is a Protestant. He is married, has two adult children, and four grandchildren. In his spare time he enjoys bike riding and tennis.

== Party ==
Ortgies occurred in 1973 in the Young Union, one of the youth wing of the CDU. In 1974 he became a member of the CDU. Already in 1975 he obtained at the municipal election for a seat in the council, the CDU his hometown Rahden. In 1982 he became chairman of the CDU Rahden City Association, which he retained until 1995. After the local elections in 1989 Ortgies Chairman of the CDU group in the city council Rahden. This office he resigned from the 2000th Since 2001 Ortgies is deputy chairman of the CDU district association Minden-Lübbecke.

Since 2003 Ortgies is chairman of the District Agricultural Committee Rhine Westphalia the CDU in the farmers' interests are represented in the CDU.

== Member of Parliament ==
Since 2 June 2000, Ortgies has been a member for the Landtag of North Rhine-Westphalia as a member of the CDU. He won the state election Minden I, where he was able to obtain 43.2% of the votes. In the 2005 parliamentary elections Ortgies' constituency voted him in with 50.3% of votes, making him one of the elected representatives of state legislature. Since 16 August 2005, Ortgies has acted as Speaker for the Environment, Nature Conservation, and Agriculture and Consumer Protection.

== Political Priorities ==
Friedhelm Ortgies' political focus is primarily in the area of agriculture and consumer protection policy and transport policy for the mill district of Minden-Lübbecke. In addition, he is regarded as representative of the interests in rural areas in North Rhine-Westphalia.
