= Chris Dercon =

Belgian art historian and curator (born 1958)

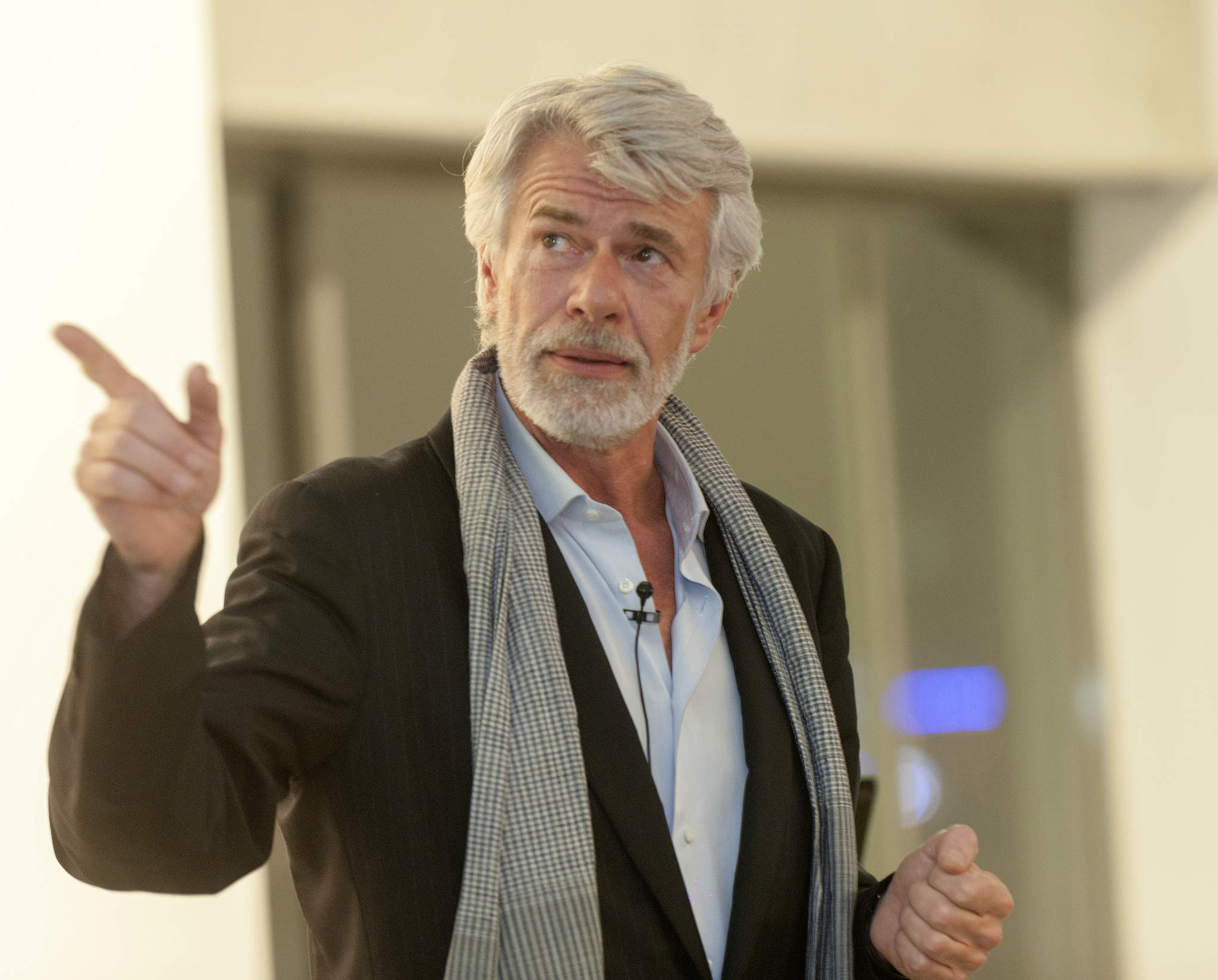
- Born: 1958
- Occupation: Art historian, art critic, university teacher, curator
- Employer: Tate Modern (2011–2016)
- Position held: museum director

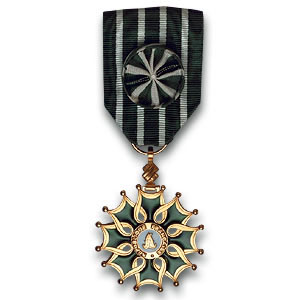
Ordre des Arts et des Lettres

Chris Dercon (born 1958), is a Belgian art historian, curator, and museum director.

Dercon has worked and published extensively on the future of museums, working with architects Rem Koolhaas, Robbrecht en Daem, Herzog and De Meuron, Gunther Vogt and Francis Kéré.

== Early life ==
Dercon studied History of Art at the Rijksuniversiteit Leiden, then Theatre Research and Film Theory at the Vrije Universiteit Amsterdam.

== Career ==
Dercon began his career as a teaching assistant at Rijksuniversiteit Leiden in the Department of Theatre Research where he initiated the Theatre Tape Festival. In 1980 he worked as an assistant curator at the Gemeentemuseum The Hague on a project about the history of world exhibitions and textiles. Starting in 1981 till 1983 he was a collaborator at the Galerie Baronian-Lambert in Ghent. As of 1982, he worked as a free-lance art critic for the De Standaard newspaper as well as contributing to Belgian Radio and Television (RTBF) in Brussels. From 1983 onwards, he also began teaching video and cinema at the KU Leuven, and at the Hoger Instituut voor Beeldende Kunsten, St Lukas, Brussels. In 1988 he was appointed program director at PS1 in New York where he worked until 1990.

Dercon was then appointed to his first directorship at Witte de With in Rotterdam, where he worked until 1995. In 1995, he curated the exhibition at the Dutch pavilion during the that year's Venice Biennale, featuring Marlene Dumas, Maria Roosen and Marijke van Warmerdam. From 1996 to 2003 he served as director of Museum Boijmans Van Beuningen in Rotterdam.

=== Haus der Kunst, 2003–2011 ===
From 2003 to 2011 Dercon served as the director of the Haus der Kunst in Munich. In his first year, he notably invited Ydessa Hendeles to guest-curate Partners, combining work by Diane Arbus, Maurizio Cattelan, James Coleman, Hanne Darboven, Walker Evans, Luciano Fabro, On Kawara, Paul McCarthy, Bruce Nauman, Giulio Paolini, Jeff Wall and Lawrence Weiner with Hendeles's own artwork Partners (The Teddy Bear Project) (2002), a large-scale installation built around an archive of family-album photographs, each including the image of a teddy bear.

=== Tate Modern, 2011–2016 ===
Dercon was appointed director of the Tate Modern in London in 2011 where he stayed until 2016. In his position as Tate Modern director, he succeeded Vicente Todolí ranking second to Sir Nicholas Serota. During his tenure, he oversaw the opening of the museum's first dedicated space to live art and installations as part of plans to explore new areas of visual culture like video, photography and performance art.

Whilst at Tate Modern, Dercon sat on the committee which chose Ferran Barenblit to be the new Barcelona Museum of Contemporary Art (MACBA) in 2015.

=== Volksbühne, 2017–2018 ===
Nominated by Berlin's State Secretary for Cultural Affairs Tim Renner in 2015, Dercon was appointed general director of the Volksbühne Berlin from 2017 until 2018, succeeding Frank Castorf. His first season began with a wide variety of productions including a 10-hour dance event in which the audience were asked to join in, and an installation by filmmaker Apichatpong Weerasethakul. But the first major world premiere of Dercon's tenure, a new play by Albert Serra, who had not previously worked in the theater, was panned by critics. He experienced the fierce opposition of part of the Berlin scene, that considered that Dercon's appointment was a betrayal of the theater’s roots. Only six months after arriving, he quit the position. Klaus Lederer, Berlin’s senator for culture, said in a statement that Dercon failed in his vision for the Volksbühne.

=== Grand Palais, 2019–2022 ===
From 2019 Dercon was the President of the Association of French National Museums-Grand Palais for an initial five-year term, where he oversaw the renovation of the Grand Palais, working with François Chatillon.

Dercon served on the jury which selected Kapwani Kiwanga as winner of the Marcel Duchamp Prize in 2020. In 2021, he was a member of the search committee that recommended Elvira Dyangani Ose to be the next director of MACBA.

=== Fondation Cartier, 2022–present ===
In 2022, Dercon was appointed director of the Fondation Cartier pour l'Art Contemporain.

== Other activities ==
Dercon currently serves as a board member for Wiels in Brussels, the Fondation d’Entreprise Galeries Lafayette in Paris, the Kunstsammlung Nordrhein-Westfalen in Germany, the Visual Arts and Museums Commissions of the Ministry of Culture of the Kingdom of Saudi Arabia. He is also a member of the International Council of the Museum Berggruen. In 2021, he was part of the selection committee that chose Elvira Dyangani Ose as first woman and the first black person to lead MACBA, where he is also part of the acquisition committee.

Dercon has been a member of film festival juries at Brussels, Rotterdam, Locarno and Sarajevo (2014).

== Personal life ==
Since 2018, Chris Dercon is married to actress Birte Carolin von Knoblauch.
