= Heinrich Bretthorst =

German politician

Heinrich Bretthorst (16 December 1883 in Rahden — 17 September 1962 in Leipzig) was a German politician (SPD / SED).

== Life ==
Bretthorst was born in the Rahden district of Lübbecke. His father died when he was three years old, his mother when he was eleven years old. He attended the eight-year Elementary School and learned carpentry. In 1920, he married his wife, Hedwig, who was born in Wüstehube. In 1923 she gave birth to a son. The son, also named Heinrich, was reported missing at the front in 1944. He never returned.

Heinrich senior was a member of the Woodworkers Association. From 1903 to 1905, he completed his military service. In 1906, he joined the SPD. From 1906 to 1914 he worked as an accounting officer of the People's care in Westphalia. After the outbreak of the First World War, he was drafted into military service and was awarded the Iron Cross second class.

== Political career ==
From 1918 to 1919, he was chairman of the Workers' and Soldiers Council in [Brieg]. From May 1919, he was secretary of the SPD sub-district-Brieg Ohlau. From 1923 to 1928 he worked as district manager of the Woodworkers Association for the District of Upper Silesia. From 1923, he was also a member of the County Council for the Province of Silesia. From 1928 to 1933, he was district secretary of the SPD for Middle Silesia.

After the takeover by the Nazis Horst was in custody from 1933 to 1934, including as a prisoner in the KZ Wroclaw Dürrgoy and then was unemployed until 1938. In May 1938, he was assigned a job in a civil engineering firm. From October 1938, he was, among other things, working as a cabinet maker. On 28 December 1940, he was conscripted to military operations in Lübeck. At the end of August 1944, he was building tank ditches at the Polish border. At the end of January 1945, he was expelled from Silesia and settled in Leipzig. By the end of World War II, he was in Leipzig from April to October of the year, where he found employment in the Police Department, provided to him by Heinrich Fleißner.

From October 1945 board Horst worked as a district secretary of the SPD Borna. Since 15 November 1945, he was a member of the General District Executive Chairman of the SPD Leipzig and Borna subdistrict.

In early February 1946, Horst was arrested by the Soviet Military Administration in Germany. After his release he became a member of the SED. From April 1946 to January 1947 he was executive secretary of the Political Department, and staff for the departments of Agriculture and Food of the SED District Board of West Saxony. Then he was secretary of the Personnel Policy Division of the SED district board of Leipzig.

In 1947 he was elected joint chairman, replacing Stanislaw Trabalski, of the Personnel Policy Division of the SED district executive in Leipzig.

From 1950 to 1952 he was a member of the SED (Social Unity Party of Germany), in the State Parliament of Saxony. He belonged to the Election Scrutiny Committee and the Audit Committee. After the dissolution of the provincial governments he became a Member of the Leipzig district assembly in 1952, which he opened as interim president. At the end of 1953, Bretthorst gave up his seat for health reasons.

== Literature ==
- Michael Rudloff: Henry Brett Horst (1883–1962): From Unit opponents SED functionary; In: Such pests are also available in Leipzig, London [etc.], 1997, ISBN 3-631-47385-0 . pp. 140–159.
- Michael Rudloff and Adam Thomas in collaboration with Jürgen Schlimper: Leipzig. Cradle of German social democracy. Leipzig 1996th
- Mike Schmeitzner, Stefan Donth: The party of the dictatorship of enforcement: KPD / SED in Saxony, 1945–1952. Every two years, inter alia Cologne 2002 S. 542nd
