= Klaus-Dieter Gröhler =

German politician

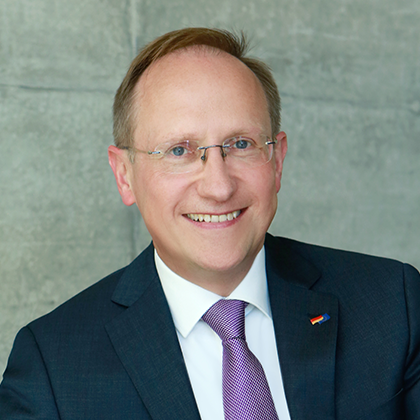
- Gröhler in 2016

Member of the Bundestag; for Berlin-Charlottenburg-Wilmersdorf
- In office 22 October 2013 – 26 October 2021
- Preceded by: Petra Merkel
- Succeeded by: Michael Müller

Personal details
- Born: 17 April 1966 (age 60) Wilmersdorf, West Berlin, West Germany
- Party: Christian Democratic Union
- Education: Free University of Berlin

Klaus-Dieter Gröhler (born 17 April 1966) is a German lawyer and politician of the Christian Democratic Union (CDU) and former public servant who served as a member of the Bundestag from the state of Berlin from 2013 until 2021. From 2011 until 2013, he worked as the city councillor responsible for building and planning in western Berlin's Charlottenburg-Wilmersdorf district.

== Political career ==
Gröhler became a member of the Bundestag in the 2013 German federal election, representing the Berlin-Charlottenburg-Wilmersdorf district. Throughout his time in parliament, he served as a member of the Budget Committee. In this capacity, he was his parliamentary group's rapporteur on the annual budgets of the Federal Ministry of the Interior and the Federal Commissioner for Data Protection and Freedom of Information. He was also a member of the so-called Confidential Committee (Vertrauensgremium) of the Budget Committee, which provides budgetary supervision for Germany's three intelligence services, BND, BfV and MAD.

From 2019, Gröhler led a parliamentary inquiry into the 2016 Berlin truck attack.

He lost his seat at the 2021 German federal election to Berlin mayor Michael Müller.

== Other activities ==
- Hertha BSC, Member

== Political positions ==
In June 2017, Gröhler voted against his parliamentary group's majority and in favor of Germany's introduction of same-sex marriage.
