= Steffen Kampeter =

German politician and lobbyist

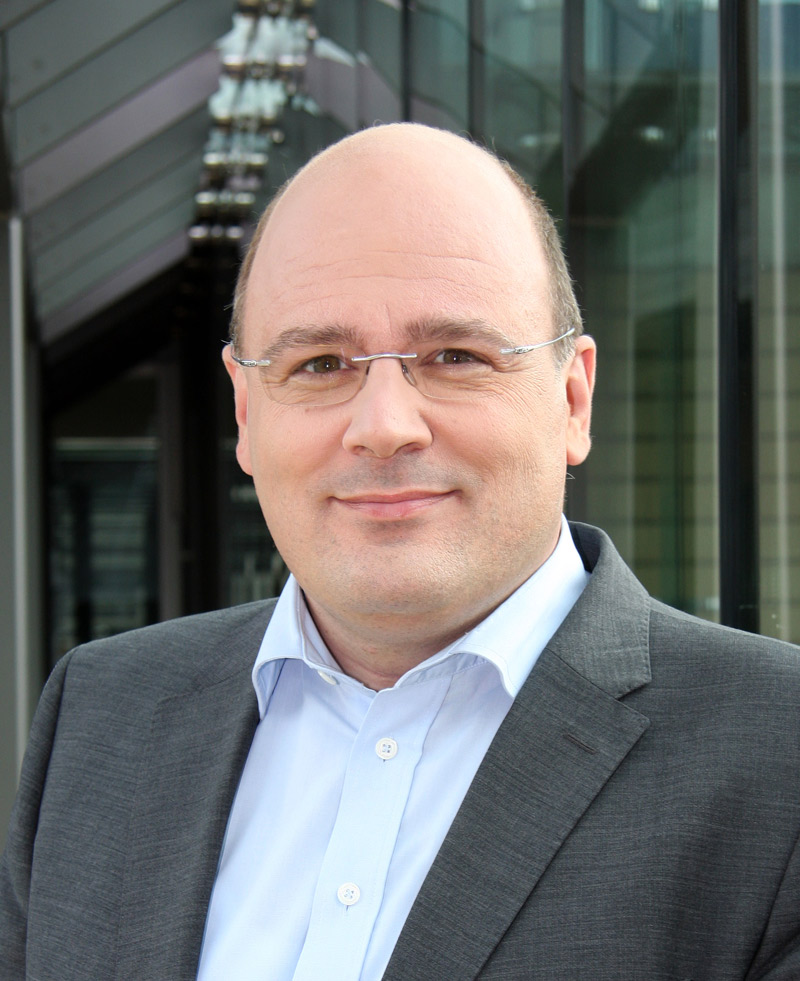
Steffen Kampeter 2012

Steffen Kampeter (born 18 April 1963 in Minden, Germany) is a German politician (CDU) and lobbyist. He was a member of the German Bundestag from 1990 to 2016 and Parliamentary State Secretary to the Federal Minister of Finance from 2009 to 2015. Since July 2016, Kampeter has been managing director of the Confederation of German Employers' Associations (BDA).

== Life and career ==
After graduating from Besselgymnasium in Minden in 1982, Kampeter did his military service with the amphibious pioneers in Minden. Kampeter then began studying economics at University of Münster in 1983, which he completed in 1988 with a degree in economics. He then worked as a research assistant at the Institute for Transport Science at the University of Münster. He then moved to Preussag AG as an employee.

Kampeter is married and has three children.

== Member of Parliament ==
Kampeter has been a member of the German Bundestag from the Minden-Lübbecke I constituency since 1990. Until the election on 27 September 2009, Kampeter was elected to the Bundestag via the North Rhine-Westphalia state list. In this election, he won the direct mandate for the Minden-Lübbecke parliamentary constituency for the CDU for the first time.

Kampeter began his parliamentary work in the Environment Committee and played a leading role. He also worked closely with the then environment ministers Klaus Töpfer and Angela Merkel on the implementation of the Soil Protection Act and the dual system (Green Dot), among other things.

He was also a member of the Budget Committee of the German Bundestag from 1994 and since 1998 has been a member exclusively. He succeeded Peter Jacoby as chairman of the CDU/CSU parliamentary group from 1999 to 2005. From 2005 to 2009, Kampeter was the budget policy spokesman for the CDU/CSU parliamentary group and was also responsible for the budget of the Federal Chancellery and thus for the financing of federal cultural policy.

Kampeter gave up his seat in the Bundestag when he moved to the Confederation of German Employers' Associations in July 2016.

== Public offices ==
Kampeter was appointed Parliamentary State Secretary at the Federal Ministry of Finance when the Merkel II cabinet was formed in 2009.

In 2010, Kampeter was appointed by the Federal Cabinet to the Board of Trustees of the Cultural Foundation and the Board of Trustees of the German Federal Environmental Foundation (DBU). He is also Deputy Chairman of the supervisory board of Initiative Musik gGmbH and chairman of the advisory board of Kulturakademie Tarabya.

In March 2015, Kampeter was appointed to the supervisory board of Deutsche Bahn AG by the German government.

Kampeter has been a member of the Administrative Board of the Federal Employment Agency since August 2019 and is currently its deputy chairman.

== Association activities ==
In June 2015, Kampeter announced his intention to be elected Chief Executive of the Confederation of German Employers' Associations (BDA). Following his election by the BDA, Kampeter was dismissed from his position as State Secretary on 3 July 2015; he was succeeded by Jens Spahn (CDU). Kampeter succeeded Reinhard Göhner (CDU) in July 2016 and retained his seat in the Bundestag until then. The twelve-month waiting period corresponds to the requirements of the law on the waiting period when switching between politics and business, which the Bundestag had passed shortly beforehand.

== Political party ==
Kampeter became a member of the Young Union and the CDU in 1981. From 1990 to 1994, he was chairman of the YU district association of East Westphalia-Lippe.

From 1992 to 1998, Kampeter was chairman of the state environmental committee of the CDU in North Rhine-Westphalia. In 1999, he was elected Chairman of the Minden-Lübbecke CDU district association. He was elected District Chairman of the CDU East Westphalia-Lippe on 23 June 2012. He held this position until May 2016.

From 30 June 2012 to June 2016, Kampeter was one of the deputy state chairmen of the CDU in North Rhine-Westphalia.

== Political positions ==
=== Budget and financial policy ===
"Sound budgets are a provision for the future in the best sense of the word," emphasises Kampeter. In his guest commentary Staying on course in the Handelsblatt of 18 February 2013, he writes that this is not about "mechanical deficit reduction, but about setting clear priorities. Intelligent consolidation accompanies structural reforms and is an expression of a growth-orientated economic and financial policy. Only orderly finances with a clear consolidation course are the key to sustainable growth and lasting prosperity."

In his article Die Schulden-Propheten irren! Kampeter contradicts the view that the debt crisis can be solved with even more debt: "High liabilities impair growth’, says Kampeter; some European countries have reached a point where they can no longer cover their budget deficits with new debt. Their debt has already reached a level that questions their proper servicing. Genuine economic performance requires competitiveness: ‘Economic strength that only exists on paper, because it is only a statistical reflection of debt-financed government spending, cannot be used to establish debt sustainability."

Kampeter's credo is "spending discipline", which he describes as an "honest, sound budgetary policy". He says: "High debts are an expression of political despondency."

=== Debt brake ===
For Kampeter, limiting public debt is also a question of intergenerational justice: "Because today's debts are tomorrow's burdens - in other words, the bill that future generations will have to pay. With the introduction of the debt brake, we have taken an important step towards reducing public debt."

=== Europe ===
In an interview with RBB - Inforadio, Steffen Kampeter called for a strict "spending diet"’ for the Budget of the European Union. "Better" and not "more" should be the motto of the 2014-2020 multiannual financial plan and thus also reflect the national consolidation efforts at the European level.

=== European rescue package ===
"Stability needs protection," says Kampeter: The ESM is the stability and protection mechanism of the Economic and Monetary Union. Even with the best prevention, a European institution equipped with the financial resources and legitimised by national parliaments is necessary to provide financial assistance to member states with refinancing problems on the capital market, prevent herd panics and reduce the risk of contagion for other eurozone countries. Germany's liability is limited to 190 billion euros. This is stated in Article 8 (5) of the ESM Treaty. There is no automatic liability mechanism and no possibility of changing this or the maximum liability amount without the involvement of the German Bundestag, writes Kampeter in an article for the FAZ on 3 August 2012.

=== Labour market: The demand for more desire to work ===
At the beginning of 2023, Kampeter attracted public attention with his controversial demand that employees should work longer and more. In an interview, the managing director of the Confederation of German Employers' Associations not only criticised the early retirement age of 63 as a political mistake, but he also called for longer working hours and greater motivation. To achieve a more stable overall economic situation, Kampeter also believes that targeted efforts should be made to create a more efficient education system and an attractive immigration concept for skilled workers. The timing of his demands, in particular the call for a greater appetite for work, is extremely poor in the eyes of many who have picked up on and quoted the interview. Furthermore, it almost seems like an accusation to talk down part-time work right now.

== Other commitments ==
Kampeter was a member of the Board of Trustees of the German Committee of AIESEC, as well as of the German Federal Environmental Foundation. He was Chairman of the Academy Advisory Board of the Tarabya Academy of Arts. He was also a member of the Board of Directors of Deutsche Welle, appointed by the German government. Kampeter is treasurer of the Freundeskreis Yad Vashem e.V. He replaced Christina Ramb as employer representative on the ZDF Television Council in 2018. He is also a member of the board of trustees of the Bibliotheca Hertziana.
