= Charlottenburg-Wilmersdorf 3 =

State electoral district of Germany

- Electoral district for the Berlin House of Representatives
- Charlottenburg-Wilmersdorf 3 in 2026
- District: Charlottenburg-Wilmersdorf
- Electorate: 31,153 (2026)

Current electoral district
- Party: Green
- Member: Petra Vandrey

Charlottenburg-Wilmersdorf 3 is an electoral constituency (German: Wahlkreis) represented in the House of Representatives of Berlin. It elects one member via first-past-the-post voting.

== Geography ==
The constituency comprises the Charlottenburg district of Berlin, and the areas on both sides of Schloßstraße, and the areas of Lietzensee, Stuttgarter Platz, and Adenauerplatz, within the borough of Charlottenburg-Wilmersdorf.

There were 31,153 eligible voters in 2026.

== Members ==
Election	Member	Party	%
1995	Ingrid Stahmer	SPD	38.5
1999	Lothar Weise	CDU	39.5
2001	Ülker Radziwill	SPD	38.3
2006	Ülker Radziwill	SPD	37.1
2011	Ülker Radziwill	SPD	33.3
2016	Ülker Radziwill	SPD	29.9
2021	Petra Vandrey	Green	30.9
2023	Petra Vandrey	Green	29.2
2026	Petra Vandrey	Green	25.7

== Election results ==
=== 2026 election ===
State election (2026): Charlottenburg-Wilmersdorf 3
Notes:	Blue background denotes the winner of the electorate vote. Pink background denotes a candidate elected from their party list. Yellow background denotes an electorate win by a list member, or other incumbent. A ✓ or ✗ denotes status of any incumbent, win or lose respectively.						
Party	Candidate	Votes	%	±%	Party votes	%	±%
Greens	✓ Petra Vandrey	6,243	25.7	▼3.5	5,405	22.1	▼5.1
SPD	Kian Niroomand	4,766	19.6	▼2.0	3,755	15.4	▼5.3
CDU	Kevin Steuer	4,713	19.4	▼6.7	4,893	20.0	▼4.0
Left	Frederike-Sophie Gronde-Brunner	4,633	19.1	▲9.7	5,765	23.6	▲13.5
AfD	Martin Kohler	1,753	7.2	▲3.2	1,846	7.6	▲3.4
BSW	Philippe Gouverneur	685	2.8		789	3.2	
FDP	Mark Hamilton	641	2.6	▼2.3	761	3.1	▼3.2
Volt	Rafael Kaaz	469	1.9		595	2.4	▲1.1
Tierschutzpartei	Nadine Tyralla	336	1.4	▼0.7	319	1.3	▼0.4
PARTEI					164	0.7	▼0.7
PdF					53	0.2	
Independent	Sebastian Alexander Schnitzer	48	0.2				
ÖDP					36	0.1	▲0.1
DKP					15	0.1	Steady
du.					11	0.0	▼0.1
SGP					5	0.0	Steady
Informal votes		304			179		
Total valid votes		24,287			24,412		
Turnout		24,591	78.9	▲10.2			
Greens hold	Majority	1,477	6.1	▲3.0			

=== 2023 repeat election ===
Changes denoted below for the 2023 election are compared to the 2016 election, as the 2021 election was declared invalid.

State election (2023): Charlottenburg-Wilmersdorf 3
Notes:	Blue background denotes the winner of the electorate vote. Pink background denotes a candidate elected from their party list. Yellow background denotes an electorate win by a list member, or other incumbent. A ✓ or ✗ denotes status of any incumbent, win or lose respectively.						
Party	Candidate	Votes	%	±%	Party votes	%	±%
Greens	Petra Vandrey	6,068	29.2	▲6.5	5,680	27.3	▲4.2
CDU	Christian Wohlrabe	5,437	26.1	▲7.3	5,014	24.1	▲8.0
SPD	✗ Ülker Radziwill	4,495	21.6	▼7.4	4,303	20.7	▼3.0
Left	Niklas Schenker	1,951	9.4	▼0.2	2,112	10.1	▼2.0
FDP	Henner Schmidt	1,025	4.9	▼3.0	1,315	6.3	▼4.2
AfD	Tobias Gall	839	4.0	▼3.8	868	4.2	▼4.0
Tierschutzpartei	Lenni Masrina Kreczynski	430	2.1		355	1.7	▲0.4
PARTEI	Michael Wassmann	370	1.8	▼0.1	280	1.3	▼0.1
Volt					269	1.3	
dieBasis	Birgit Klinner	146	0.7		118	0.6	
Team Todenhöfer					79	0.4	
Gray Panthers					70	0.3	▼0.2
Pirates					62	0.3	▼1.3
Klimaliste					48	0.2	
Independent	Ingolf Uwe Arnim Weimer	33	0.2				
The Grays					30	0.1	
du.					28	0.1	
FW					26	0.1	
Mieterpartei					25	0.1	
Humanists					22	0.1	
DKP					20	0.1	Steady
Verjüngungsforschung					19	0.1	▼0.2
ÖDP					18	0.1	
Bergpartei, die ÜberPartei					13	0.1	
Bildet Berlin!					13	0.1	
SGP					8	0.0	Steady
BüSo					7	0.0	Steady
The Pinks/Alliance 21					7	0.0	
LKR	Christian Schmidt	15	0.1		5	0.0	▼0.4
New Democrats					5	0.0	
NPD					2	0.0	▼0.1
German Conservative					1	0.0	
Informal votes		149			135		
Total valid votes		20,809			20,822		
Turnout		20,978	68.8	▼2.8			
Greens gain from SPD	Majority	631	3.1				

=== 2021 election (annulled) ===
The election in 2021 was annulled and rerun in 2023.

State election (2021): Charlottenburg-Wilmersdorf 3
Notes:	Blue background denotes the winner of the electorate vote. Pink background denotes a candidate elected from their party list. Yellow background denotes an electorate win by a list member, or other incumbent. A ✓ or ✗ denotes status of any incumbent, win or lose respectively.						
Party	Candidate	Votes	%	±%	Party votes	%	±%
Greens	Petra Vandrey	7,555	31.0	▲8.3	6,972	28.5	▲5.4
SPD	✗ Ülker Radziwill	5,766	23.6	▼5.4	5,300	21.7	▼1.9
CDU	Christian Wohlrabe	4,396	18.0	▼0.8	3,788	15.5	▼0.6
Left	Niklas Schenker	2,363	9.7	▲0.1	2,791	11.4	▼0.7
FDP	Henner Schmidt	1,873	7.7	▼0.2	2,107	8.6	▼1.9
AfD	Tobias Gall	900	3.7	▼4.1	926	3.8	▼4.4
Volt					423	1.7	
PARTEI	Michael Wassmann	530	2.2	▲0.3	419	1.7	▲0.2
Tierschutzpartei	Lenni Masrina Kreczynski	492	2.0		341	1.4	Steady
dieBasis	Birgit Klinner	461	1.9		381	1.6	
Team Todenhöfer					232	0.9	
FW					127	0.5	
Klimaliste					98	0.4	
Pirates					90	0.4	▼1.2
Gray Panthers					76	0.3	▼0.3
The Grays					72	0.3	
Independent	Ingolf Uwe Arnim Weimer	51	0.2				
APT					51	0.2	
ÖDP					35	0.1	
du.					32	0.1	
Verjüngungsforschung					32	0.1	▼0.1
Mieterpartei					29	0.1	
Humanists					26	0.1	
Bildet Berlin!					23	0.1	
DKP					18	0.1	Steady
New Democrats					14	0.1	
Bergpartei, die ÜberPartei					12	0.0	
SGP					7	0.0	Steady
NPD					7	0.0	▼0.1
LKR	Christian Schmidt	19	0.1		6	0.0	▼0.4
The Pinks/Alliance 21					6	0.0	
BüSo					3	0.0	Steady
German Conservative					0	0.0	
Informal votes		250			159		
Total valid votes		24,406			24,444		
Turnout		24,708	80.6	▲9.0			
Greens gain from SPD	Majority	1,789	7.4				

== See also ==
- Politics of Berlin
- House of Representatives of Berlin
