= Paul Bleiß =

German politician (1904–1996)

Member of the Bundestag
- In office 7 September 1949 – 17 October 1965

Personal details
- Born: 6 November 1904 Berlin
- Died: 17 April 1996 (aged 91)
- Party: SPD

Paul Bleiß (6 November 1904 – 17 April 1996) was a German politician of the Social Democratic Party (SPD) and former member of the German Bundestag.

== Life ==
He was a member of the German Bundestag from the 1949 to 1965 federal elections. From 1957 to 1965 he was chairman of the Bundestag Committee on Transport, Post and Telecommunications. Between 1949 and 1961 he was always directly elected to parliament in the Minden-Lübbecke I constituency.

== Literature ==
Herbst, Ludolf; Jahn, Bruno (2002). Vierhaus, Rudolf (ed.). Biographisches Handbuch der Mitglieder des Deutschen Bundestages. 1949–2002 [Biographical Handbook of the Members of the German Bundestag. 1949–2002] (in German). München: De Gruyter - De Gruyter Saur. p. 1715. ISBN 978-3-11-184511-1.
