= Martin Kohler (politician) =

German politician (born 1997)

- Kohler in 2026

Member of the Berlin House of Representatives
- Incumbent
- Assumed office 29 October 2026

Personal details
- Born: 1997 (age 28–29)
- Party: Alternative for Germany (since 2013)

Martin Christian Thomas Kohler (born 1997) is a German politician who was elected member of the Berlin House of Representatives in 2026. He has been a borough councillor of Charlottenburg-Wilmersdorf since 2021, and has served as group leader of the Alternative for Germany in the council since 2022. He has served as chairman of Generation Germany in Berlin since 2026.
