= Tim Renner =

German music producer, journalist and author

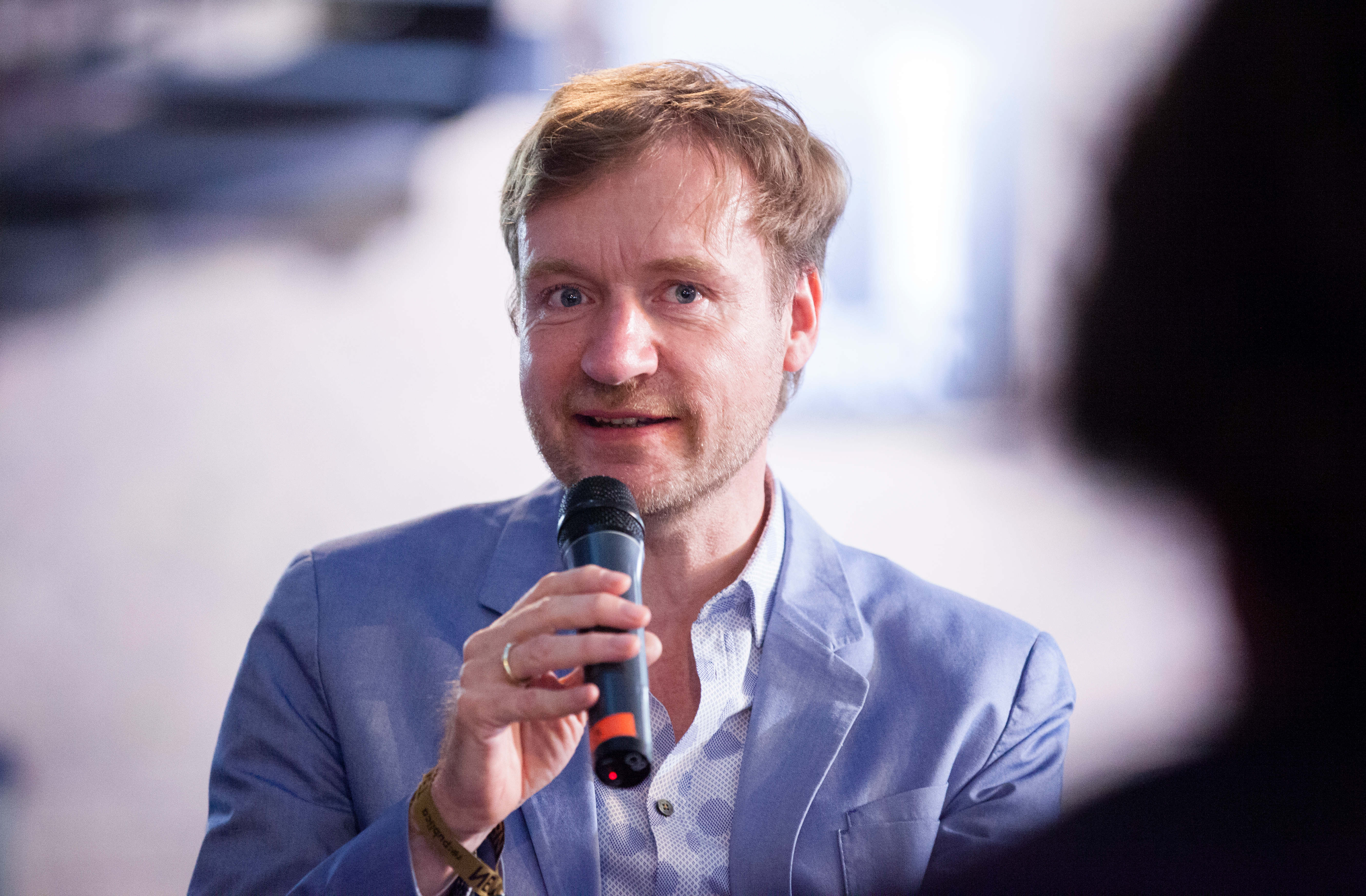
Renner in 2016

Tim Renner (born 1 December 1964) is a German music producer, journalist and author. From 2001 to 2004, he was CEO and chairman of Universal Music GmbH in Germany. From 2014 till 2016 he was one of the secretaries of the city of Berlin for cultural affairs.

== Life ==
Renner was born in Berlin. His mother worked as a social worker in a prison regime, his biological father Hans Christof Stenzel is a movie director, his stepfather Herbert Renner works in bibles. When he was seven years old, the family moved to Hamburg. At the beginning of the 1980s, Renner created his own cassette-based fanzine called "Festival der guten Taten". After that, he worked as moderator for a radio show of Norddeutscher Rundfunk (for instance there was the radio show "Die Lage der Nation"), he wrote pop columns for the magazine "Script", as well as for Hamburg's city papers "Tango" und "Tempo". In 1984, he was part of directing and screenwriting for the production of the filmproject "Für eine Handvoll D-Mark", a music-magazine e.g. with Abwärts, Markus Oehlen and Ti-Tho.

In 1986, he started working as Artists-&-Repertoire-Manager at Polydor, where he led the new division "Polydor Progressive Music" starting in 1989. In 1994, he founded the Polygram sub-label Motor Music Ltd., which became one of the iconic labels of the 1990s in Germany. He built up acts like Phillip Boa, Tocotronic, Element of Crime and Sportfreunde Stiller. His greatest success was internationally known Berlin formation Rammstein. When Polygram merged with Universal in 1998 to "Universal Music Deutschland", Renner succeeded former CEO Wolf D. Gramatke, as well as becoming chairman. In 2003, he was named "Global Leader for Tomorrow" at the World Economic Forum in Davos.

In 2004, Renner left Universal Music and wrote the book "Kinder, der Tod ist gar nicht so schlimm", about his personal views on the future of the music industry. With "Motor Entertainment", Renner created a group of companies, ranging from the label Motor Music over Motor Tours as well as doing management. Until 2011, there was also the radio channel Motor FM.

In 2009, Renner became professor at Popakademie Baden-Württemberg. In 2011, he released the book "Digital ist besser", written together with his two years older brother, the media journalist Kai-Hinrich Renner. The title of the book stems from a song and album from band Tocotronic. Since May 2011, Renner and Motor Entertainment co-produce monthly TV show "Berlin live" at "ZDKkultur". Since March 2012, he moderates the radio show "Radio Renner" at radio channel Bremen Vier. In 2013, he released the book Wir hatten Sex in den Trümmern und träumten: Die Wahrheit über die Popindustrie. The title comes from a song of the band Die Sterne.

== Political career ==
At the age of 18, Renner entered the party SPD, but left the party soon after. In November 2013, Renner entered the party for the second time.

On 27 February 2014, Berlin's mayor Klaus Wowereit introduced Renner as new secretary for cultural affairs of Berlin. He succeeded André Schmitz.

He is said to have little influence, according to magazine "Kulturpolitische Mitteilungen". When Berlin named Katja Lucker "Rock- und Popbeauftragte" in 2013, with her "Music Board", they gave her one million Euros and a team. 95 percent of money spent in Berlin on cultural topics is dedicated to operas, museums and theatres.

In March 2014, Renner made public that he wanted to name Chris Dercon as new intendant for the "Volksbühne Berlin", having formerly worked for the Tate Gallery of Modern Art. The decision has been met with skepticism, criticized for instance by Claus Peymann.

With the new red-red-green coalition, the cultural department fell to the party Die Linke and Renner had to resign from office on 8 December 2016.

In 2016, Renner announced to run for office for the German parliament for the general election in 2017. He was elected, but not re-elected four years later. He served in the German parliament for the time.

In the negotiations to form a coalition government between the Christian Democratic Union (CDU) and the SPD under the leadership of Kai Wegner following the 2023 state elections, Renner was part of his party’s delegation to the working group on economic affairs, energy, technology and municipally owned corporations.

== Other activities ==
- Chamber of Commerce and Industry (IHK) of Berlin, Member of the Presidium
- Memorial to the Murdered Jews of Europe Foundation, Ex-Officio Member of the Board of Trustees (2014–2016)
- German Historical Museum (DHM), Ex-Officio Substitute Member of the Board of Trustees (2014–2016)

== Personal life ==
Renner is married, with two daughters.

== Books ==
- Kinder, der Tod ist gar nicht so schlimm. Über die Zukunft der Musik- und Medienindustrie. Campus, Frankfurt am Main 2004, ISBN 3-593-37636-9; new edition: Rogner & Bernhard, Berlin 2008, ISBN 978-3-8077-1045-7.
- Digital ist besser. Warum das Abendland auch durch das Internet nicht untergehen wird. Campus, Frankfurt am Main 2011, ISBN 978-3-593-39208-0 (with Kai-Hinrich Renner).
- Wir hatten Sex in den Trümmern und träumten: Die Wahrheit über die Popindustrie. Berlin Verlag, Berlin 2013, ISBN 978-3-8270-1161-9 (with Sarah Wächter).

== Literature ==
- (dpa): Barenboim und Berghain. Popmanager Tim Renner wird Staatssekretär. In: Berliner Zeitung, 27. April 2014
