= Budget of Germany =

Budget of the German federal government

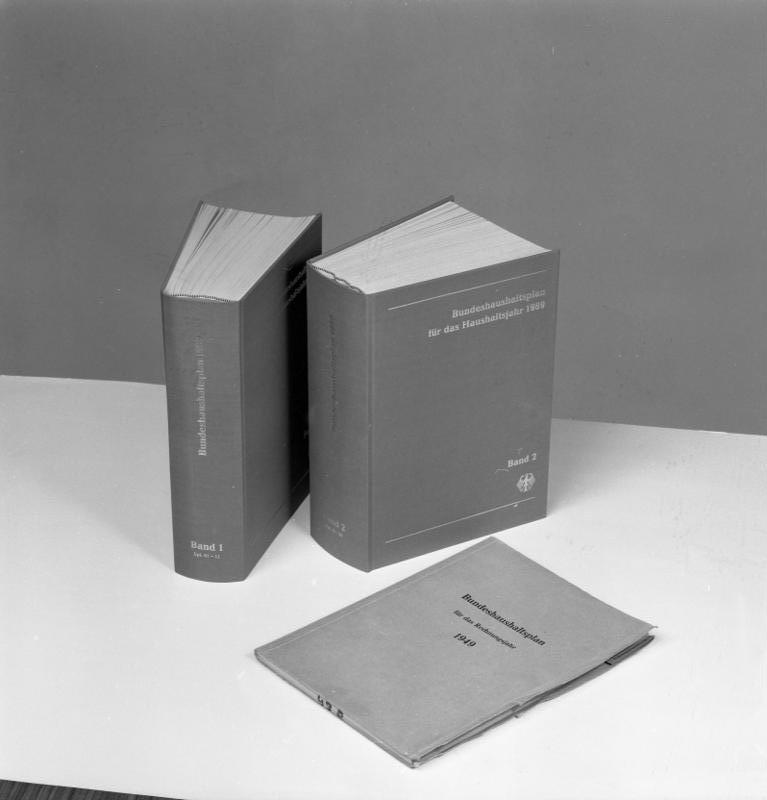
German budget books; 1989 volume being the books, compared to 1949’s budget in the file

The public sector budget of Germany is divided among the administrative divisions of the country.

The Federal Statistical Office of Germany breaks down the 2023 general government budget into the following categories:

Item	Central government	Social security	Regional and local government	EU shares
Revenues (billion €)	526.2	820.7	887.3	34.2
Expenditures (billion €)	613.9	818.0	894.3	34.2
Balance (billion €)	-87.6	2.7	-7.0	0.0

The International Monetary Fund reports Germany's government revenue and expenditure amounted to 47.0% and 49.5% of GDP in 2022.

In terms of accounting period, the national government's fiscal year aligns with the calendar year (1 January to 31 December).

Since 2009, Germany has a balanced budget amendment in its Constitution, the so-called "debt brake" (Schuldenbremse in German), which restricts annual structural deficits to 0.35% of GDP. If a natural disaster or extraordinary emergency exists, the debt brake may be temporarily suspended for a budget year by a majority vote in Parliament, as was done in 2020-2023. Controversially, the numerous and financially significant special funds established by the Federal government (29 funds with a collective financial volume of 869 billion EUR as of 2023) do not currently fall within the scope of the debt brake. On a sub-national level, the debt brake bans Germany's 16 states from running structural deficits, a restriction which came into effect in 2020. In 2025, the outgoing German Parliament amended the debt brake through an agreement among the CDU/CSU, SPD, and Green political parties. The package contains four main provisions:

- Defense spending above 1% of GDP is exempt from the debt brake
- The permitted structural deficit is doubled to 0.70% of GDP by allowing Germany's 16 states to run a 0.35% deficit
- A 12-year, 500 billion EUR special fund for infrastructure is established
- A reference to achieving climate neutrality / net zero emissions by 2045 is added into the German constitution

== Purpose ==
The primary purpose of the budget is to create an overview of the country's revenues and expenses for the following fiscal year or years. Since the budget is based on past expenditures, it is merely a prediction of the future which can lead to unexpected budget deficits as the fiscal year progresses. In the short term, such deficits are commonly financed by borrowing money which has led to the significant long-term debt of the German federal government.

== Procedure ==
The Bundestag passes the budget as an addendum to the annual or bi-annual budget act (Art. 110, Basic Law). Revenues and expenses are separated by ministries and other administrative entities.

== Budget guidelines ==
Specific guidelines established by law govern the creation of the budget. Specifically, these are:

1. Completeness: the budget must include all instances of revenues and expenditures separately.
2. Clarity: the budget must be organized along ministry and functional lines.
3. Unity: the budget must include all revenues and expenditures
4. Accuracy: revenues and expenditures must be estimated based on actual fair market value or expected values. To avoid manipulations, such estimates are conducted by a separate official body.
5. Historical Succession: the budget must be enacted before the fiscal year starts. If there is no budget for the current fiscal year, the previous budget continues in effect.
6. Specificity: expenditures must be designated as falling into a specific area, at a specific time, and at a specific level.
7. Publicity: all debates on the budget in the Bundestag as well as the final enacted budget are publicly available and accessible. Some expenditures, however, may be classified with appropriate restrictions on who can access information on those.

== Example budget ==
The federal budget for 2021 is €369.3 billion. With total government spending of €1.76 trillion in 2021, the federal budget comprises only a fraction of total public sector spending in Germany.

Germany's budget for the 2005 fiscal year can be found below, which also outlines the basic budget structure.

Function	Description	Expenditures (Note: Estimated budget authority as presented in the budget (in thousand EUR))
01	Federal President	23,636
02	Bundestag	550,920
03	Bundesrat	19,952
04	Federal Chancellor	1,510,084
05	Federal Foreign Office	2,205,783
06	Ministry of the Interior, Building and Community	4,216,641
07	Ministry of Justice and Consumer Protection	338,592
08	Ministry of Finance	4,041,769
09	Ministry for Economic Affairs and Energy	37,974,665
10	Ministry of Food and Agriculture	5,106,957
12	Ministry of Transport and Digital Infrastructure	23,255,509
14	Ministry of Defence	23,900,000
15	Ministry of Health	84,409,880
16	Ministry of Environment, Natural Conservation and Nuclear Security	769,024
17	Ministry for Family Affairs, Senior Citizens, Women and Youth	4,571,691
19	Federal Constitutional Court	17,631
20	Federal Auditing Office	86,668
23	Ministry for Economic Cooperation and Development	3,859,093
30	Ministry for Education and Research	8,540,422
32	Federal Debt	40,431,841
33	Support	8,821,008
60	General Financial Administration	(261,766)
Total:		254,300,000
