= List of German Christian Democratic Union politicians =

A list of notable members of the Christian Democratic Union.

A B C D E F G H I J K L M N O P Q R S T U V W X Y Z

== A ==
- Manfred Abelein
- Wilhelm Abeln
- Michael von Abercron
- Annemarie Ackermann
- Ulrich Adam
- Raban Adelmann
- Konrad Adenauer
- Eduard Adorno
- Jochen van Aerssen
- Christoph Ahlhaus
- Peter Albach
- Stephan Albani
- Siegbert Alber
- Detlev Albers, de:Detlev Albers
- Johannes Albers
- Christian Albrecht
- Ernst Albrecht
- Michael Albrecht
- Ann Christin von Allwörden
- Odal von Alten-Nordheim
- Norbert Altenkamp
- Dieter Althaus
- Walter Altherr
- Bernd Althusmann
- Peter Altmaier
- Peter Altmeier
- Walther Amelung
- Franz Amrehn
- Philipp Amthor
- Thomas Andresen, de:Thomas Andresen (Politiker)
- Rico Anton
- Jutta Appelt
- Josef Arndgen
- Gottfried Arnold
- Karl Arnold
- Lena Arnoldt
- Helmut Artzinger
- Reza Asghari
- Roger Asmussen
- Wolfgang Aßbrock
- Tijen Ataoğlu
- Anneliese Augustin
- Kristy Augustin, de:Kristy Augustin
- Jürgen Augustinowitz
- Dietrich Austermann

== B ==
- Cornell Babendererde
- Franz Josef Bach
- Kunigunde Bachl
- Monika Bachmann
- Felor Badenberg
- Dietrich Bahner
- Fritz Baier
- Albert Baldauf
- Bernhard Balkenhol
- Friedrich Baltrusch
- Jürgen Banzer
- Thomas Bareiß
- Heinz-Günter Bargfrede
- Heinrich Barlage
- Uwe Barschel
- René Barthel
- Thomas Barth
- Norbert Barthle
- Walter Bartram
- Rainer Barzel
- Maximilian Bathon
- Wolf Bauer
- Bernhard Bauknecht
- Günter Baumann
- Brigitte Baumeister
- Adolf Bauser
- Ernst-Reinhard Beck
- Michael Becken
- Alfred Becker
- Rudolf Beckmann
- Sascha van Beek
- Maik Beermann
- Johannes Behner
- Florian Bellaire
- Meinrad Belle
- Veronika Bellmann
- Ernst Benda
- Hildegard Bentele
- Fritz Berendsen
- Friedrich Berentzen
- Stefan Bereuter
- Lieselotte Berger
- Markus Berger
- Stefan Berger
- Ulrich Berger
- André Berghegger
- Sabine Bergmann-Pohl
- Christoph Bergner
- Otto Bernhardt
- Melanie Bernstein
- Ute Bertram
- Ole von Beust
- Peter Beyer
- Marc Biadacz
- Kurt Biedenkopf
- Ulrich Biel
- Adolf Bieringer
- Hans-Dirk Bierling
- Peter Biesenbach, de:Peter Biesenbach
- Rolf Bietmann
- Steffen Bilger
- Michael Billen
- Florian Bilic
- Clemens Binninger
- Alfred Biolek
- Philipp Birkenmaier
- Andreas Birkmann
- Carl-Eduard von Bismarck
- Otto Christian Archibald von Bismarck
- Otto Bittelmann
- Joseph-Theodor Blank
- Theodor Blank
- Stefanie Blaschka
- Heribert Blens
- Peter Bleser
- Hildegard Bleyler
- Hans Blöcker
- Irma Blohm
- Rudolf Blügel
- Harry Blum
- Norbert Blüm
- Erik Blumenfeld
- Peter Blumenrath
- Antje Blumenthal
- André Bock
- Paul Bock
- Helmut von Bockelberg
- Michael Boddenberg
- Veronika Bode
- Ernst von Bodelschwingh
- Wilhelm Boden
- Leif Bodin
- Clemens von Boeselager, de:Clemens von Boeselager
- Philipp Freiherr von Boeselager
- Christian von Boetticher, de:Christian von Boetticher
- Reimer Böge
- Friedrich Bohl
- Reimer Böge
- Franz Böhm
- Georg Böhme
- Günter Böhme
- Maria Böhmer
- Wolfgang Böhmer
- Rudolf Böhmler
- Frank Bommert
- Simone Borchardt
- Jochen Borchert
- Ulrich Born
- Wolfgang Börnsen
- Peter Boroffka
- Caroline Bosbach
- Wolfgang Bosbach
- Gustav Bosselmann, de:Gustav Bosselmann
- Frederik Bouffier
- Volker Bouffier
- Klaus Bouillon
- Norbert Brackmann
- Klaus Brähmig
- Michael Brand
- Bruno Brandes
- Ina Brandes
- Helmut Brandt
- Aenne Brauksiepe
- Ralf Brauksiepe
- Florian Braun
- Gerhard Braun
- Helge Braun
- Rudolf Braun
- Ursula Braun-Moser
- Karolin Braunsberger-Reinhold
- Anna Bauseneick
- Silvia Breher
- Ferdinand Breidbach
- Michael Breilmann
- Georg-Ludwig von Breitenbuch
- Klaus Bremm
- Josef Brenner
- Heinrich von Brentano
- Wilhelm Brese
- Steeven Bretz
- Birgit Breuel
- Paul Breuer
- Tobias C. Bringmann
- Ralph Brinkhaus
- Lutz Brinkmann
- Ursula Gräfin von Brockdorff, de:Ursula Gräfin von Brockdorff
- Carsten Brodesser
- Marlon Bröhr
- Elmar Brok
- Else Brökelschen
- Werner Broll
- Josef Brönner
- Walter Brookmann
- Valentin Brück
- Wolfram Brück
- Monika Brudlewsky
- Karl Brüggemann
- Monika Brüning
- Julian Brüning
- Johannes Brüns
- Tom Brüntrup
- Georg Brunnhuber
- Gerd Bucerius
- Ewald Bucher
- Karl von Buchka
- Tim Bückner
- Heinz Budde
- Benedikt Büdenbender
- Josef Bugl
- Andreas Bühl
- Karl August Bühler
- Klaus Bühler
- Dietrich Bürkel
- Josef Bugl
- Hartmut Büttner
- Fritz Burgbacher
- Alfred Burgemeister
- Albert Burger
- Helmut Buschbom
- Verena Butalikakis
- Hartmut Büttner
- Norbert Buske
- Dankward Buwitt

== C ==
- Cajus Julius Caesar
- Lorenz Caffier
- Christian Calderone
- Johannes Callsen, de:Johannes Callsen
- Karl Carstens
- Manfred Carstens
- Peter Harry Carstensen
- Sandra Carstensen
- Daniel Caspary
- Johann-Tönjes Cassens, de:Johann-Tönjes Cassens
- Joe Chialo
- Charlotte Quik
- Sabine Christiansen
- Thies Christophersen
- Ines Claus
- Claus Christian Claussen
- Karl Eduard Claussen, de:Karl Eduard Claussen
- Conrad Clemens
- Joachim Clemens
- Birgit Collin-Langen
- Gitta Connemann
- Franz Josef Conrad
- Uwe Conradt
- Herbert Czaja
- Mario Czaja

== D ==
- Wolfgang Dahler
- Bernhard Daldrup
- Ulrich Daldrup
- Eberhard Dall'Asta
- Harm Dallmeyer
- Astrid Damerow
- Carl Damm
- Hans Daniels
- Alois Dauenhauer
- Leo Dautzenberg
- Klaus Daweke
- Kerstin von der Decken
- Johannes Degener
- Wolfgang Dehnel
- Hubert Deittert
- Rembert van Delden
- Gertrud Dempwolf
- Ellen Demuth
- Oskar-Hubert Dennhardt
- Karl Deres
- Arved Deringer
- Guido Déus
- Andreas Deuschle
- Gerhard Dewitz
- Otto Dibelius
- Hans Dichgans
- Hermann Diebäcker
- Dieter Dieckhoff
- Renate Diemers
- Eberhard Diepgen
- Alexander Dierks
- Helga Diercks-Norden
- Peter-Michael Diestel
- Frank Dietrich
- Maria Dietz
- Wilhelm Dietzel
- Birgit Diezel
- Esther Dilcher
- Alexandra Dinges-Dierig
- Karina Dörk
- Marie-Luise Dött
- Michael Donth
- Werner Dörflinger
- Hansjürgen Doss
- Alfred Dregger
- August Dresbach
- Josef Duchač
- Otto Dullenkopf
- Lena Düpont

== E ==
- Joachim Ebmeyer
- Heinz-Jörg Eckhold
- Heinrich Eckstein
- Jürgen Echternach
- Heinz Eggert
- Christian Ehler
- Hermann Ehlers
- Sebastian Ehlers
- Lars Ehm
- Hermann Ehren
- Henning Eichberg
- Danny Eichelbaum
- Karl Eigen
- Susanne Eisenmann
- Dirk Elbers
- Alexander Elbrächter
- Wolfgang Engelmann
- Rainer Eppelmann
- Hermann A. Eplée
- Ludwig Erhard
- Roswitha Erlenwein
- Bastian Ernst
- Angela Erwin
- Joachim Erwin
- Heinz Dieter Eßmann
- Franz Etzel
- Peter Etzenbach
- Stefan Evers
- Horst Eylmann
- Anke Eymer

== F ==
- Ilse Falk
- Oskar Farny
- Herbert Faust
- Jochen Feilcke
- Uwe Feiler
- Thomas Feist
- Aloys Feldmann
- Aloys Felke
- Karl H. Fell
- Dorothee Feller
- Heinz Fenrich
- Enak Ferlemann
- Joachim Fest
- Wolfgang Fiedler
- Hans Filbinger
- Eva Gräfin Finck von Finckenstein
- Ulf Fink
- Magdalena Finke
- Axel Fischer
- Dirk Fischer
- Leni Fischer
- Pierre Fischer
- Maria Flachsbarth
- Karl-Heinz Florenz
- Annika Fohn
- Alexander Föhr
- Klaus Francke
- Björn Franken
- Christoph Frauenpreiß
- Thorsten Frei
- Helmut Fritsche
- Martin Frey
- Michael Freytag
- Siegfried Fricke
- Ferdinand Friedensburg
- Michel Friedman
- Bernhard Friedmann
- Anke Frieling
- Heinrich Frieling
- Maika Friemann-Jennert
- Joseph Frings
- Erich G. Fritz
- Oliver Fritzsche
- Christian Fühner
- Hans Furler
- Wolfgang Fürniß

== G ==
- Lothar Gaa
- Michael Gahler
- Horst Gallert
- Richard Gamp
- Jürgen Gansel
- Gerhard Gaul, de:Gerhard Gaul
- Katharina Gebauer
- Thomas Gebhart
- Axel Gedaschko
- Jörg Geerlings
- Jörg Geibert
- Lennart Geibert
- Constanze Geiert
- Wolfgang von Geldern, de:Wolfgang von Geldern
- Hans Geisler
- Heiner Geißler
- Sebastian Gemkow
- Rainer Genilke
- Christoph Gensch
- Marion Gentges
- Günther Gereke
- Heinrich Gerns
- Eugen Gerstenmaier
- Otti Geschka
- Roland Gewalt
- Shanta Ghosh
- Paul Gibbert
- Christian Giencke
- Eberhard Gienger
- Gerd Gies
- Jens Gieseke
- Jennifer Gießler
- Cemile Giousouf
- Dennis Gladiator
- Anne-Karin Glase
- Heinrich Glasmeyer
- Hans Globke
- Peter Gloystein
- Wilma Glücklich
- Sandra Gockel
- Reinhard Göhner
- Antonia Goldner
- Gregor Golland
- Georg Gölter
- Tanja Gönner
- Lutz Goepel
- Eberhard Goldhahn
- Alfred Gomolka
- Silke Gorißen
- Wilhelm von Gottberg
- Peter Götz
- Rudolf Götz
- Johann Baptist Gradl
- Ingeborg Gräßle
- Fabian Gramling
- Friedbert Grams
- Ute Granold
- Adrian Grasse
- Niklas Graßelt
- Hermann Gröhe
- Klaus-Dieter Gröhler
- Manfred Groh
- Theresa Gröninger
- Michael Grosse-Brömer
- Jenny Groß
- Steffen Große
- Astrid Grotelüschen
- Werner Grübmeyer
- Stefan Gruhner
- Manfred Grund
- Oliver Grundmann
- Jonathan Grunwald
- Monika Grütters
- Herlind Gundelach
- Serap Güler
- Herlind Gundelach
- Daniel Günther
- Georg Günther
- Fritz Güntzler

== H ==
- Martin Haag
- Friederike de Haas
- Christian Haase
- Marlis Gräfin vom Hagen, de:Marlis Gräfin vom Hagen
- Manuel Hagel
- Karl Hahn, de:Karl Hahn (Politiker, 1901)
- Thomas Haldenwang
- Helga Haller von Hallerstein
- Walter Hallstein
- Johannes Handschumacher
- Peter Hans, de:Peter Hans
- Tobias Hans
- Carl-Detlev Freiherr von Hammerstein
- Stephan Harbarth
- Heinz Hardt
- Jürgen Hardt
- Monika Harms
- Christian Hartmann
- Gottfried Haschke
- Karl-Günther von Hase
- Reiner Haseloff
- Raimund Haser
- Kai-Uwe von Hassel
- Wilfried Hasselmann, de:Wilfried Hasselmann
- Matthias Hauer
- Peter Hauk
- Mark Hauptmann
- Dennis Haustein
- Barbara Havliza
- Bruno Heck
- Stefan Heck
- Dagmar Heib
- Tobias von der Heide
- Helmut Heiderich
- Mechthild Heil
- Ursula Heinen-Esser
- Gustav Heinemann
- Jan Heinisch
- Roland Heintze
- Philipp Heißner
- Heinrich Hellwege
- Fritz Hellwig
- Renate Hellwig
- Dieter Helm
- Herbert Helmrich, de:Herbert Helmrich
- Wilhelm Helms
- Josef Hempelmann
- Rudolf Henke
- Ottfried Hennig, de:Ottfried Hennig
- Michael Hennrich
- Marc Henrichmann
- Kristina Herbst
- Niclas Herbst
- Diana Herbstreuth
- Hubert Hermans
- Andreas Hermes
- Christian Herrgott
- Julian Herrmann
- Hans Herwarth von Bittenfeld
- Roman Herzog
- Guido Heuer, de:Guido Heuer
- Ansgar Heveling
- Claus-Joachim von Heydebreck, de:Claus-Joachim von Heydebreck
- Peter von der Heydt Freiherr von Massenbach, de:Peter von der Heydt Freiherr von Massenbach
- Hellmuth Heye
- Bernd Heynemann
- Hugo Hickmann
- Ruth Hieronymi
- Reinhold Hilbers
- Theodor Hillenhinrichs
- Matthias Hiller
- Werner Hilpert
- Peter Hintze
- Christian Hirte
- Heribert Hirte
- Felix Hitzig
- Günther Hochgartz
- Martin Hohmann
- Gordon Hoffmann, de:Gordon Hoffmann
- Heiko Hoffmann, de:Heiko Hoffmann
- Philip Hoffmann
- Thorsten Hoffmann
- Katy Hoffmeister
- Nicole Hoffmeister-Kraut, de:Nicole Hoffmeister-Kraut
- Uwe Hollweg
- Eike Holsten
- Stephan Holthoff-Pförtner, de:Stephan Holthoff-Pförtner
- Karl Holzamer
- Franz-Josef Holzenkamp
- Hartmut Honka
- Matthias Hoogen
- Laura Hopmann
- Hendrik Hoppenstedt
- Karsten Friedrich Hoppenstedt
- Franziska Hoppermann
- Hans Horn, de:Hans Horn (Politiker)
- Charles M. Huber
- Isabell Huber
- Anette Hübinger
- Hubert Hüppe
- Agnes Hürland-Büning
- Heinz Günther Hüsch
- Herbert Hupka
- Eugen Huth

== I ==
- Bernhard Ilg
- Frank Imhoff
- Erich Iltgen
- Hans-Jürgen Irmer
- Gustav Isernhagen

== J ==
- Michael Jacobi
- Rolf Jähnichen
- Peter Jahr
- Anne Janssen
- Georg Jarzembowski
- Thomas Jarzombek
- Elisabeth Jeggle
- Philipp Jenninger
- Elaine Jentsch
- Alexander Jordan
- Pascual Jordan
- Andreas Jung
- Franz Josef Jung
- Ingmar Jung
- Xaver Jung
- Ulrich Junghanns

== K ==
- Jakob Kaiser
- Margot Kalinke
- Hermann Kalvelage, de:Hermann Kalvelage
- Steffen Kampeter
- Manfred Kanther
- Sandro Kappe
- Ian Karan
- Anja Karliczek
- Torbjörn Kartes
- Jörg Kastendiek
- Hans Katzer
- Siegfried Kauder, de:Siegfried Kauder
- Volker Kauder
- Stefan Kaufmann
- Martin Kayenburg, de:Martin Kayenburg
- Stephan Keller
- Heinrich Kemper
- Hedwig Keppelhoff-Wiechert, de:Hedwig-Keppelhoff-Wiechert
- Matthias Kerkhoff
- Walter von Keudell
- Walther Leisler Kiep
- Roderich Kiesewetter
- Kurt Georg Kiesinger
- Lukas Kilian
- Georg Kippels
- Eckart von Klaeden
- Markus Klaer
- Ewa Klamt
- Christa Klaß
- Bärbel Kleedehn
- Jürgen Klemann
- Hans Hugo Klein
- Ottilie Klein
- Helga Kleiner
- Gerhard Kleinmagd
- Jürgen Klemann
- Wilfried Klenk
- Jochen Klenner
- Barbara Klepsch, de:Barbara Klepsch
- Egon Klepsch
- Jürgen Klimke
- Reiner Klimke
- Bodo Klimpel
- Hermann Kling
- Julia Klöckner
- Tomasz Klon
- Hans-Ulrich Klose
- Wilhelm Knabe
- Karsten Knolle
- Dieter-Lebrecht Koch
- Lothar Koch
- Tobias Koch (politician), de:Tobias Koch (Politiker)
- Roland Koch
- Anne König
- Thadäus König
- Jens Koeppen
- Carsten Körber
- Eugen Kogon
- Helmut Kohl
- Erich Köhler
- Heinrich Köhler
- Horst Köhler
- Kristina Köhler
- Vincent Kokert
- Daniel Kölbl
- Heinrich Konen
- Karen Koop, de:Karen Koop
- Christoph Konrad
- Hermann Kopf
- Stefan Korbach
- Walter Korn
- Rolf Koschorrek
- Thomas Kossendey
- Michelle Kraft
- Waldemar Kraft
- Gerd Krämer, de:Gerd Krämer (Politiker, 1957)
- Annegret Kramp-Karrenbauer
- Wilhelm Kratz
- Günther Krause
- Peter D. Krause, de:Peter D. Krause
- Alexander Krauß
- Oliver Krauß
- Regina Kraushaar, de:Regina Kraushaar
- Michael Kretschmer
- Thomas Kretschmer
- Klaus Kribben, de:Klaus Kribben
- Gunther Krichbaum
- Günter Krings
- Heinrich Krone
- Friedrich Kronenberg
- Hans Krüger
- Paul Krüger
- Johann-Henrich Krummacher
- Rüdiger Kruse
- Tilman Kuban
- Bettina Kudla
- Thomas Kufen
- Georg Kühling
- Roy Kühne
- Marie-Sophie Künkel
- Helmut Kuhlmann
- Gottfried Kuhnt, de:Gottfried Kuhnt
- Ernst Kuntscher
- Johannes Kunze
- Peter Kurth
- André Kuper

== L ==
- Karl A. Lamers
- Clemens Lammerskitten, de:Clemens Lammerskitten
- Matthias Lammert
- Norbert Lammert
- Katharina Landgraf
- Heinz Lange
- Nico Lange
- Richard Langeheine, de:Richard Langeheine
- Werner Langen
- Gerd Langguth
- Armin Laschet
- Lena-Sophie Laue
- Karl-Josef Laumann
- Hanna-Renate Laurien
- Gerd Lausen, de:Gerd Lausen
- Silke Lautenschläger, de:Silke Lautenschläger
- Kurt Lechner
- Sebastian Lechner
- Klaus-Heiner Lehne
- Robert Lehr
- Ursula Lehr
- Eugen Leibfried
- Katja Leikert
- Helmut Lemke
- Ernst Lemmer
- Philipp Lengsfeld
- Vera Lengsfeld
- Carl Otto Lenz
- Hanfried Lenz
- Marlene Lenz
- Otto Lenz
- Wilhelm Lenz
- Ursula von der Leyen
- Christine Lieberknecht
- Sven Liebhauser
- Ingbert Liebing
- Lutz Lienenkämper
- Peter Liese
- Nathanael Liminski
- Hanns-Gero von Lindeiner
- Georg Lindner
- Carsten Linnemann
- Norbert Lins
- Patricia Lips
- Karl Lorberg, de:Karl Lorberg
- Siegfried Lorek
- Peter Lorenz
- Ralph Alexander Lorz
- Bodo Löttgen
- Hubertus Prinz zu Löwenstein-Wertheim-Freudenberg
- Martin Lucke
- Jan-Marco Luczak
- Saskia Ludwig
- Heinrich Lübke
- Paul Lücke
- Heinrich Lummer
- Hermann Lutz
- Heinrich Lützenkirchen
- Lena Arnoldt

== M ==
- Karin Maag
- Claus Ruhe Madsen
- Lothar de Maizière
- Thomas de Maizière
- Ernst Majonica
- Kurt Malangré
- Marcus Malsch
- Gisela Manderla
- Thomas Mann
- Stefan Mappus
- Matern von Marschall
- Erwin Marschewski
- Albrecht Martin, de:Albrecht Martin
- Kurt Martin
- Hans-Georg von der Marwitz
- Willy Massoth
- Andreas Mattfeldt
- Stefan Mappus
- Agnes Katharina Maxsein
- Hans-Peter Mayer
- Gerhard Mayer-Vorfelder
- David McAllister
- Beate Meißner
- Michael Meister
- Siegfried Meister
- Erich Mende
- Winfried Menrad
- Walter Mentzel, de:Walter Mentzel
- Hans-Joachim von Merkatz
- Angela Merkel
- Friedrich Merz
- Mario Mettbach
- Horst Metz
- Jan Metzler
- Hans Joachim Meyer
- Laurenz Meyer
- Stephan Meyer
- Carsten Meyer-Heder
- Reinhard Meyer zu Bentrup
- Franz Meyers
- Maria Michalk
- Mathias Middelberg
- Paul Mikat
- Georg Milbradt
- Matthias Miller
- Egbert Möcklinghoff, de:Egbert Möcklinghoff
- Wilhelm Mohr (politician, 1885), de:Wilhelm Mohr (Politiker)
- Mike Mohring
- Hartmut Möllring
- Karsten Möring
- Maximilian Mörseburg
- Karl-Theodor Molinari
- Dietrich Monstadt
- Wendelin Morgenthaler
- Volker Mosblech
- Richard Muckermann
- Carsten Müller
- Florian Müller
- Gebhard Müller
- Gotffried Müller
- Helmut Müller
- Hermann Müller
- Hildegard Müller
- Johannes Müller
- Nadine Müller
- Peter Müller
- Sebastian Müller
- Sepp Müller
- Alfred Müller-Armack
- Helmut Münch
- Werner Münch
- Jens Münster
- Philipp Murmann

== N ==
- Jens Nacke
- Stefan Nacke
- Wilhelm Naegel
- Karl-Heinz Narjes
- Hartmut Nassauer
- Jakob Neber
- Peter Nellen
- August Neuburger
- Bernd Neumann
- Hubert Ney
- Andreas Nick
- Petra Nicolaisen
- Aldona Niemczyk
- Clemens Nieting
- Maria Niggemeyer
- Claudia Nolte
- Günter Nooke
- Günter von Nordenskjöld

== O ==
- Theodor Oberländer
- Frank Oesterhelweg
- Günther Oettinger
- Aygül Özkan
- Moritz Oppelt
- Marcus Optendrenk
- Friedhelm Ortgies
- Eduard Orth
- Helma Orosz
- Henning Otte
- Barbara Otte-Kinast
- Aygül Özkan

== P ==
- Doris Pack
- Ingrid Pahlmann
- Manfred Palmen
- Seyran Papo
- Martin Pätzold
- Rudi Pawelka
- Else Peerenboom-Missong
- Hans Peter Pawlik
- Patrick Pender
- Hartmut Perschau
- Eduard Pestel
- Daniel Peters
- Busso Peus
- Natalie Pfau-Weller
- Joachim Pfeiffer
- Robert Pferdmenges
- Heinrich Pickel
- Markus Pieper
- Elmar Pieroth
- Frank-Michael Pietzsch, de:Frank-Michael Pietzsch
- Christian Piwarz
- Romina Plonsker
- Hermann Pünder
- Arnold Poepke
- Ronald Pofalla
- Gerhard Pohl
- Jan-Wilhelm Pohlmann
- Jonas Pohlmann
- Ruprecht Polenz
- Werner Pöls
- Horst Posdorf
- Roman Poseck
- Hans-Gert Pöttering
- David Preisendanz
- Ludwig Preiß
- Karin Prien
- Hermann Pünder
- Lucia Puttrich, de:Lucia Puttrich

== Q ==
- Reinhold Quaatz
- Godelieve Quisthoudt-Rowohl

== R ==
- Thomas Rachel
- Kerstin Radomski
- Dennis Radtke
- Bernhard Raestrup
- Sophie Ramdor
- Wilhelm Rawe, de:Wilhelm Rawe
- Nicole Razavi, de:Nicole Razavi
- Heribert Rech
- Jan Redmann
- Henning Rehbaum
- Luise Rehling
- Reinhold Rehs
- Katherina Reiche
- Markus Reichel
- Irmgard Reichhardt, de:Irmgard Reichhardt
- Egon Reinert
- Marc Reinhardt
- Lukas Reinken
- Jonas Reiter
- Walter Remmers, de:Walter Remmers
- Werner Remmers, de:Werner Remmers
- Torsten Renz
- Hans-Peter Repnik
- Herbert Reul
- Boris Rhein
- Jan Riedel
- Josef Rief
- Lothar Riebsamen
- Heinz Riesenhuber
- Sven Rissmann
- Burkhard Ritz, de:Burkhard Ritz
- Berndt Röder
- Franz-Josef Röder
- Hannelore Rönsch
- Hubert Rohde
- Gerhard Rohner
- Lars Rohwer
- Hannelore Rönsch
- Gerhard Rödding
- Franz-Josef Röder
- Johannes Röring
- Julie Rösch
- Sven Rosomkiewicz
- Matthias Rößler
- Petra Roth
- Norbert Röttgen
- Stefan Rouenhoff
- Thomas Röwekamp
- Erwin Rüddel
- Volker Rühe
- Michael Ruhl
- Stefan Ruland
- Oskar Rümmele
- Jürgen Rüttgers

== S ==
- Ines Saborowski
- Michael Sack
- Christopher Salm
- Bernhard Sälzer
- Karin Sander
- Catarina dos Santos-Wintz
- Alexander-Martin Sardina
- Barbara Saß-Viehweger
- Botho Prinz zu Sayn-Wittgenstein-Hohenstein
- Casimir Johannes, Prince of Sayn-Wittgenstein-Berleburg
- Lucas Schaal
- Carl-Anton Schaefer, de:Carl-Anton Schaefer
- Anita Schäfer
- Barbara Schäfer
- Thomas Schäfer
- Jürgen Scharf
- Alois Schätzle
- Bernhard Schätzle
- Thomas Schäuble
- Wolfgang Schäuble
- Hermann Schaufler
- Annette Schavan
- Daniel Scheen-Pauls
- Manfred Schell
- Gunnar Schellenberger
- Christiane Schenderlein
- Fritz Schenk
- Oliver Schenk
- Jörn Schepelmann
- Thorsten Schick
- Karl Schiewerling
- Maximilian Schimmel
- Katrin Schindele
- Norbert Schindler
- Dagmar Schipanski
- Herbert Schirmer
- Hans Schlange-Schöningen
- Emil Schlee
- Hartwig Schlegelberger, de:Hartwig Schlegelberger
- Hanns Martin Schleyer
- Cornelia Schmachtenberg
- Heiko Schmelzle
- Andreas Schmidt (politician, 1956), de:Andreas Schmidt (Politiker, 1956)
- Henri Schmidt
- Ilse Schmidt
- Otto Schmidt
- Sebastian Schmidt
- Stephan Schmidt
- Claudia Schmidtke
- Ingo Schmitt
- Joseph Schmitt
- Hendrik Schmitz
- Lucas Schmitz
- Marco Schmitz
- Kurt Schmücker
- Christine Schneider
- Erich Schneider
- Horst Schnellhardt
- Jutta Schmitt-Lang
- Birgit Schnieber-Jastram
- Gordon Schnieder
- Patrick Schnieder
- Hermann Schnipkoweit, de:Hermann Schnipkoweit
- Friedrich Wilhelm Schnitzler
- Andreas Schockenhoff
- Rupert Scholz
- Tino Schomann
- Nadine Schön
- Joachim Graf von Schönburg-Glauchau
- Felix Schönebeck
- Reinhard von Schorlemer
- Josef Schrage
- Fritz Schramma
- Waldemar Schreckenberger
- Patrick Schreiber
- Walther Schreiber
- Felix Schreiner
- Kajo Schommer, de:Kajo Schommer
- Jörg Schönbohm
- Gerhard Schröder
- Heinrich Schröder
- Horst Schröder
- Jürgen Schröder
- Kristina Schröder
- Ole Schröder
- Jacob Schrot
- Carl Schröter
- Fabian Schrumpf
- Egon Schübeler
- Cordula Schubert
- Fritz Schuler
- Wolfgang Schulhoff
- Klaus-Peter Schulze
- Sven Schulze
- Christina Schulze Föcking, de:Christina Schulze Föcking
- Hubert Schulze-Pellengahr
- Uwe Schummer
- Uwe Schünemann
- Armin Schuster
- Ludwig Schuster
- Albrecht Schütte
- Josef Schüttler
- Andreas Schwab
- Armin Schwarz
- Günther Schwarz
- Henning Schwarz
- Stefan Schwarz
- Werner Schwarz
- Elisabeth Schwarzhaupt
- Christian Schwarz-Schilling
- Elisabeth Schwarzhaupt
- Torsten Schweiger
- Sarah Schweizer
- Hartmut Schwesinger
- Hermann Schwörer
- Hans-Christoph Seebohm
- Kai Seefried
- Ralf Seekatz
- Richard Seelmaecker, de:Richard Seelmaecker
- Cornelia Seibeld
- Berndt Seite
- Rudolf Seiters
- Johannes Selle
- Reinhold Sendker
- Ingo Senftleben
- Katharina Senge
- Patrick Sensburg
- Bernd Siebert
- Hans-Christian Siebke
- Daniel Sieveke
- Björn Simon
- Sven Simon
- Kurt Sieveking
- Volker Sklenar
- Renate Sommer
- Sebastian Sommer
- Tino Sorge
- Jens Spahn
- Lothar Späth
- Marc Speicher
- Viviane Spethmann, de:Viviane Spethmann
- Adolf Spies von Büllesheim
- Friede Springer
- Rudolf Sprung
- Ashok-Alexander Sridharan
- Holger Stahlknecht
- Wolfgang Stammler
- René Stadtkewitz
- Anton Stark
- Robert Stauch
- Frank Steffel
- Albert Stegemann
- Andreas Steier
- Viktoria Steinbiß
- Sebastian Steineke
- Johannes Steiniger
- Theodor Steltzer
- Christian von Stetten
- Wolfgang von Stetten
- Dirk Stettner
- Dieter Stier
- Josef Stock, de:Josef Stock
- Diana Stöcker
- Gerhard Stoltenberg
- Monika Stolz
- Anton Storch
- Gero Storjohann
- Dietrich Stratmann
- Lutz Stratmann, de:Lutz Stratmann
- Peter Straub
- Karin Strenz
- Günter-Helge Strickstrack
- Thomas Stritzl
- Peter Strobel
- Heiko Strohmann, de:Heiko Strohmann
- Detlef Struve
- Michael Stübgen
- Otto Stumpf
- Christina Stumpp
- Daniel Sturm
- Rita Süssmuth
- Sabine Sütterlin-Waack

== T ==
- Hermann-Josef Tebroke
- Tim Teßmann
- Erwin Teufel
- Christine Teusch
- Roland Theis
- Dennis Thering
- Ulf Thiele
- Friedrich Thielen
- Hans-Jürgen Thies
- Alexander Throm
- Björn Thümler
- Christian Tischner
- Dietlind Tiemann
- Stanislaw Tillich
- Antje Tillmann
- Robert Tillmanns
- Astrid Timmermann-Fechter
- Rudolf Titzck, de:Rudolf Titzck
- Peter Tobaben
- Jürgen Todenhöfer
- Dirk Toepffer
- Klaus Töpfer
- Stephan Toscani
- Karl Traub
- André Trepoll
- Anna-Elisabeth von Treuenfels-Frowein
- Tina Trompter
- Klaus von Trotha, de:Klaus von Trotha
- Gonca Türkeli-Dehnert

== U ==
- Markus Uhl
- Rick Ulbricht
- Gunnar Uldall
- Thomas Ulmer
- Hans-Karl von Unger
- Tom Unger
- Christian Untrieser
- Octavian Ursu

== V ==
- Arnold Vaatz
- Oswin Veith
- Sabine Verheyen
- Kerstin Vieregge
- Thomas Viesehon
- Bernhard Vogel
- Rudolf Vogel
- Volkmar Vogel
- Stefanie Vogelsang
- Oliver Vogt
- Tobias Vogt (politician, born 1985)
- Tobias Vogt (politician, born 1988)
- Mario Voigt
- Sören Voigt
- Johannes Volkmann
- Angelika Volquartz
- Axel Voss
- Andrea Voßhoff
- Klaus Voussem
- Christoph de Vries
- Kees de Vries

== W ==
- Gerhard Wächter
- Karina Wächter
- Oskar Wacker
- Oskar Wackerzapp
- Johann Wadephul
- Joseph Wagenbach
- Carl-Ludwig Wagner
- Christean Wagner
- Herbert Wagner
- Anja Wagner-Scheid
- Ronny Wähner
- Alois Graf von Waldburg-Zeil
- Walter Wallmann
- Marion Walsmann
- Marie Wasem
- Nicole Walter-Mundt
- Hanna Walz
- Karl Walz
- Marco Wanderwitz
- Johanna Wanka
- Nina Warken
- Niklas Waßmann
- Hans Watzke
- Hans-Joachim Watzke
- Andrea Wechsler
- Thomas Webel
- Helene Weber
- Johannes Weber
- Karl Weber (born 1898)
- Karl Weber (born 1936)
- Hedda von Wedel
- Kai Wegner
- Oliver Wehner
- Karlheinz Weimar
- Wolfram Weimer
- Marcus Weinberg
- Franz Weiß
- Gerald Weiß
- Maria-Lena Weiss
- Peter Weiß
- Sabine Weiss
- Werner Weiß
- Richard von Weizsäcker
- Klaus Welle
- Ingo Wellenreuther
- Karl-Georg Wellmann
- Emmi Welter
- Helmut Wendelborn
- Marian Wendt
- Uta Wentzel
- Heike Wermer
- Dietrich Wersich
- Johanna von Westphalen
- Karl von Westphalen
- Ludger Westrick
- Bernadette Weyland
- Kai Whittaker
- Peter Wichtel
- Annette Widmann-Mauz
- Rainer Wiegard, de:Rainer Wiegard
- Rainer Wieland
- Klaus Wiener
- Bettina Wiesmann
- Johannes Wilde
- Hans Wilhelmi, de:Hans Wilhelmi
- Gert Willner
- Klaus-Peter Willsch
- Dorothee Wilms
- Willy Wimmer
- Heinrich Windelen
- Johannes Winkel
- Bernhard Winkelheide
- Elisabeth Winkelmeier-Becker
- Hermann Winkler
- Matthias Wissmann
- Klaus Wiswe
- Oliver Wittke
- Karl von Wogau
- Guido Wolf
- Karin Wolff
- Manfred Wörner
- Barbara Woltmann
- Bernhard Worms
- Franz-Josef Wuermeling
- Hendrik Wüst
- Mareike Wulf
- Christian Wulff
- Gabriele Wurzel

== Y ==
- Oğuzhan Yazıcı
- Helmut Yström
- Cornelia Yzer

== Z ==
- Erich Zander
- Benno Zech
- Gerhard Zeitel
- Alexander Zeyer
- Werner Zeyer
- Joachim Zeller
- Paul Ziemiak
- Tamara Zieschang
- Lars-Jörn Zimmer
- Matthias Zimmer
- Otto Zink
- Nicolas Zippelius
- Nadja Zivkovic, de:Nadja Zivkovic
- Vanessa-Kim Zobel
- Constantin Heereman von Zuydtwyck
- Theo Zwanziger
