= Schätzle =

Schätzle is a German surname. Notable people with the surname include:

- Anita Schätzle (born 1981), German freestyle wrestler
- Alois Schätzle (1925–2022), German politician
- Bernhard Schätzle (born 1954), German politician
