= Tessmann =

Tessmann is a surname. Notable people with the surname include:

- Bernhard Tessmann (1912–1998), German scientist
- Brad Tessmann (born 1960), Australian rugby league player
- Günter Tessmann (1884–1969), German anthropologist and explorer
- Heath Tessmann (born 1984), Australian rugby union player
- Tanner Tessmann (born 2001), American soccer player
- Tim Teßmann (born 1989), German politician
