= Arnold Poepke =

German politician

Arnold Poepke (born 25 November 1901 – 14 July 1989) was a German politician and member of the CDU.

== Biography ==
Poepke was born in Kaminsker Hauland, Kreis Obornik in 1901.

After attending school, Pöpke completed an apprenticeship as a locksmith, and first worked as a locksmith in Posen and later switched to the Friedrich Krupp AG in Essen. He spent some time at the Protestant Social School in Spandau and worked as a Protestant workers and association secretary from 1923 to 1933. At the same time, he attended evening high schools in Kassel and Berlin, obtained his Mittlere Reife in 1932, and passed his Abitur in Berlin in 1933. Then he began to study political science and economics, graduating in 1937 with a doctorate.

From 1939 to 1945, he participated as a soldier in the Second World War. When the war ended, he went into Soviet captivity, but was discharged in 1948.

Poepke was executive director of the Protestant Workers' Movement from 1951. He also served as executive chairman of the Institute for Workers' Education in Essen, which he had previously helped to found.

Poepke belonged to the German Bundestag from 1961 to 1965. He was also a representative of the North Rhine-Westphalian Landtag.

He died in Northeim in 1989.

== See also ==
- List of German Christian Democratic Union politicians
