= Karl-Theodor Molinari =

German general (1915–1993)

- Born: 7 February 1915; Bonn
- Died: 11 December 1993 (aged 78); Dortmund
- Military career
- Allegiance: Nazi Germany (to 1945); West Germany
- Branch: Army
- Service years: ?–1945; 1956–70
- Rank: Oberstleutnant (Wehrmacht); Generalmajor (Bundeswehr)
- Unit: Panzer-Regiment 36
- Conflicts: World War II
- Awards: Knight's Cross of the Iron Cross

Karl-Theodor Molinari (7 February 1915 – 11 December 1993) was an officer in the German Army and later in the Bundeswehr. He resigned in 1970 with the rank of a Generalmajor after it became public that he had possibly been involved in the shooting of 105 French resistance fighters in the Ardennes area on 12/13 June 1944. These allegations have not been proven since. Besides, Molinari was a politician, representative of the German Christian Democratic Union in the post-war years.

== Awards ==
- Iron Cross (1939) 2nd and 1st Class
- German Cross in Gold (3 February 1943)
- Knight's Cross of the Iron Cross on 3 November 1944 as Major and commander of the I./Panzer-Regiment 36

== See also ==
- List of German Christian Democratic Union politicians

Military offices
Preceded by Generalmajor Herbert Reidel	Commander of 7th Panzer Division (Bundeswehr); 1 October 1966 – 30 September 1969	Succeeded by Generalmajor Eike Middeldorf
