= Hubert Rohde =

German politician (1929–2019)

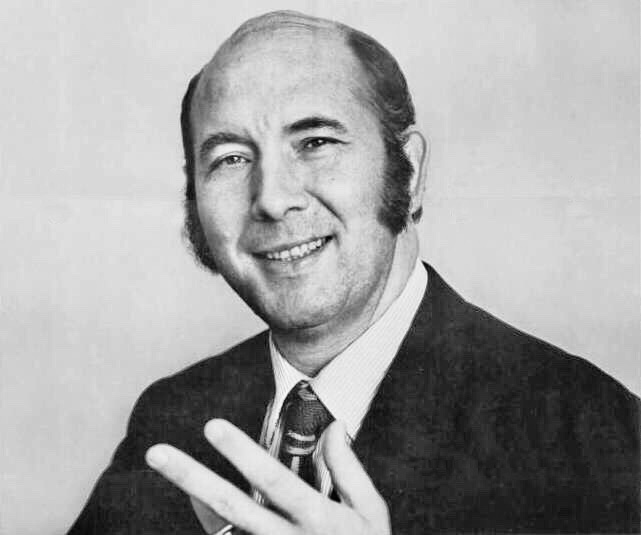

Vice President of the Landtag of Saarland
- In office 14 July 1975 – 31 December 1977
- President: Ludwig Schnur
- Preceded by: Franz Schneider
- Succeeded by: Rita Waschbüsch

Personal details
- Born: Hubert Heinrich Thomas Rohde; 28 February 1929 Hildesheim, Lower Saxony, Germany
- Died: 17 February 2019 (aged 89)
- Party: Christian Democratic Union
- Spouse: Karin Attorf
- Children: Marie-Bernadette, Daniela, Dominicus, Sebastian

Hubert Rohde (28 February 1929 in Hildesheim – 17 February 2019) was a German pedagogue and politician, representative of the German Christian Democratic Union.

== Life ==
Hubert Rohde was born in a Christian family in Hildesheim. To avoid being recruited by the Waffen-SS he "volunteered" in the heavy artillery, a unit that he knew wasn't under their domain, and he never actually served for war.

After the war he studied philosophy, history of art, pedagogy, archaeology as well as theology in Frankfurt, Munich, Innsbruck, Salzburg and Dublin. Since then he was a member in the Kartellverband katholischer deutscher Studentenvereine.

Hubert Rohde was married; his wife Karin (born Attorf) died in 1988. The couple had four children. After 1962 he lived in Mandelbachtal in Saarland.

== Professional life ==
After getting his doctorate of philosophy (1953) Rohde worked mainly as teacher and later as docent at the universities of Paderborn and Saarbrücken. In 1965 he was habilitated to professor in pedagogy.

He became a member of Saarland's parliament in 1970, where he first presided over the cultural committee and later became the parliament's vice-president.

In 1977 he was voted the SR's artistic director, a position he kept until 1988.

From 1988 to 2000 he was general secretary of the Deutsch-Französischer Kulturrat (fr:Haut Conseil Culturel Franco-Allemand).

For several years he was Chancellor of the Order of the Holy Sepulchre a Catholic chivalric order that assists schools and hospitals in Palestine. For his engagement in Franco-German cooperation, France's president awarded him the cross of the Légion d'honneur.

Until his death in February 2019, Hubert Rohde was involved in cultural and social areas in many ways as a chairman, co-founder, member and donor. He received numerous honours and awards for his commitment.

== See also ==
- List of German Christian Democratic Union politicians
