= Roger Asmussen =

German politician (1936–2015)

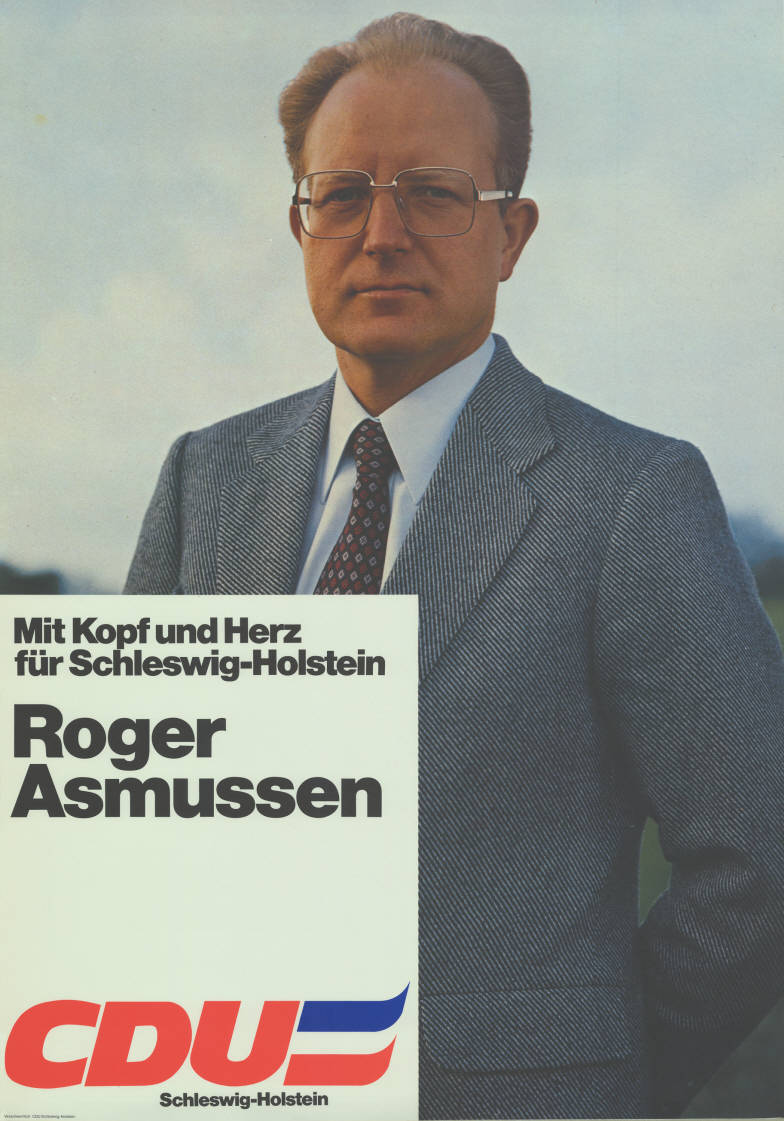
Roger Asmussen

Roger Asmussen (September 6, 1936, in Bremerhaven – June 7, 2015) was a German politician. He was a representative of the German Christian Democratic Union. From 1983 to 1988 he was Finance Minister of Schleswig-Holstein.

== Life and career ==
After leaving an Evangelical Lutheran school, he studied economics at the University of Freiburg, where he graduated in 1960. He initially worked in various companies, and from 1968 to 1983 he was managing director of the Association of West Coast companies eV. Asmussen entered politics in 1964, and first joined the Young Union and in 1968 the CDU. From 1974 to 1987 he was CDU regional chairman in Dithmarschen.

From 1970 to 1978 he was a deputy of the district council in Dithmarschen. From 1971 to 1988 Asmussen was a member of the Landtagsabgeordneter in Schleswig-Holstein. He represented the constituency of South Dithmarschen in Parliament. On 13 October 1978 Asmussen was honored with the Bundesverdienstkreuz am Bande (Order of Merit).

From 1979 to 1983 he served as deputy. From 13 April 1983 to 31 May 1988 he was Finance Minister of Schleswig-Holstein. From 9 June 1987, he was also the German Minister of Economy and Transport.

Since 2004 he has been chairman of the board General Ortskrankenkasse of Schleswig-Holstein. Since 2005 he has been vice chairman of the trustees of the Foundation Naturschutz Schleswig-Holstein and since June 2005, conservation officer of the Schleswig-Holstein state government. On 4 January 2006, he joined in protest against the nature conservation policy of the grand coalition in office.

Asmussen was married and had two children.

== See also ==
- List of German Christian Democratic Union politicians
