= Erich Schneider (politician) =

German politician (1933–2024)

President of the Landtag of Baden-Württemberg
- In office 5 June 1984 – 10 June 1992
- Preceded by: Lothar Gaa
- Succeeded by: Fritz Hopmeier

Personal details
- Born: 2 August 1933 Gschwend, Württemberg, Germany
- Died: 8 February 2024 (aged 90) Burgstetten, Baden-Württemberg, Germany
- Party: CDU
- Education: Diplom-Verwaltungswirt (FH)

Erich Schneider (2 August 1933 – 8 February 2024) was a German politician. A member of the Christian Democratic Union, he served as president of the Landtag of Baden-Württemberg from 1984 to 1992.

Schneider died in Burgstetten on 8 February 2024, at the age of 90.
