= Heinrich Pickel =

German businessman and politician

Heinrich Pickel (born 1883 in Kottenheim – 3 July 1964 in Kottenheim) was a German businessman and politician and representative of the German Center Party and German Christian Democratic Union.

== Life and career ==
Pickel was born the son of an industrialist. He took over the family business in the stonemasons industry, and in 1922 assumed post of CEO of the TUBAG company. In 1951 he resigned working as CEO, but still remained on the board. Pickel was elected in 1924 in the Council of the Municipality of Kottenheim and was from 1928 to 1933 district council member of the district of Mayen.

During the time of the Weimar Republic, Pickel was a member of the Center Party. After 1945, he was among the founders of the German Christian Democratic Union (CDU) in his native Kottenheim. He was elected chairman of the CDU district (Mayen) in 1951 and was a member of the District Board and the Landtag of Rhineland-Palatinate from 1947 to 1963.

== See also ==
- List of German Christian Democratic Union politicians
