= Wilhelm Abeln =

German politician (1894–1969)

- Born: 2 June 1894; Markhausen, Germany
- Died: 17 May 1969 (aged 74); Markhausen, Germany
- Occupation: Politician

Wilhelm Abeln (2 June 1894 – 17 May 1969) was a German farmer and politician. He was a representative of the German Christian Democratic Union and a member of the appointed regional parliament in Oldenburg from its first session on 30 January 1946 until its last session on 6 November 1946.

== See also ==
- List of German Christian Democratic Union politicians
