= Andreas Birkmann =

German politician

Andreas Birkmann (born 14 August 1939) is a German politician, representative of the German Christian Democratic Union. He has served as Justice Minister of Thüringen.

Birkmann obtained a doctorate in 1967 in Cologne and served as a judge at the Federal Court in Karlsruhe. In 1991 he joined the State Chancellery of the Free State of Thuringia. From 1995 he was State Secretary in the Thuringian Ministry of Finance.

Birkmann was the 1999 Minister of Justice of the Free State of Thuringia. After his retirement from the state government in 2002, he was co-owner of the law firm of Tank, Feber and Birkmann in Karlsruhe. Since 1 January 2008 he has been in the partner company Spilker & Collegen

Birkmann is a member of the city council of Gernsbach, and is Deputy Chairman of the CDU and member of the Board of the urban community of the CDU in Gernsbach.

He is a member of the Multiple Sclerosis Society (DMSG) in the State of Thuringia. He chaired the board from 1995 to 2003.

== See also ==
- List of German Christian Democratic Union politicians
