= Julie Rösch =

German politician

Member of the Bundestag
- In office 7 September 1949 – 15 October 1961

Personal details
- Born: 23 October 1902
- Died: 13 May 1984 (aged 81)
- Party: CDU

Julie Rösch (23 October 1902 – 13 May 1984) was a German politician of the Christian Democratic Union (CDU) and former member of the German Bundestag.

== Life ==
Rösch was a member of the German Bundestag from its first election in 1949 to 1961. From 1949 to 1953, she had entered parliament via the state list of the CDU Württemberg-Hohenzollern and from 1953 to 1961 via the state list of the CDU Baden-Württemberg.

== Literature ==
Herbst, Ludolf; Jahn, Bruno (2002). Vierhaus, Rudolf (ed.). Biographisches Handbuch der Mitglieder des Deutschen Bundestages. 1949–2002 [Biographical Handbook of the Members of the German Bundestag. 1949–2002] (in German). München: De Gruyter - De Gruyter Saur. p. 1715. ISBN 978-3-11-184511-1.
