= Matthias Miller =

German politician (born 1991)

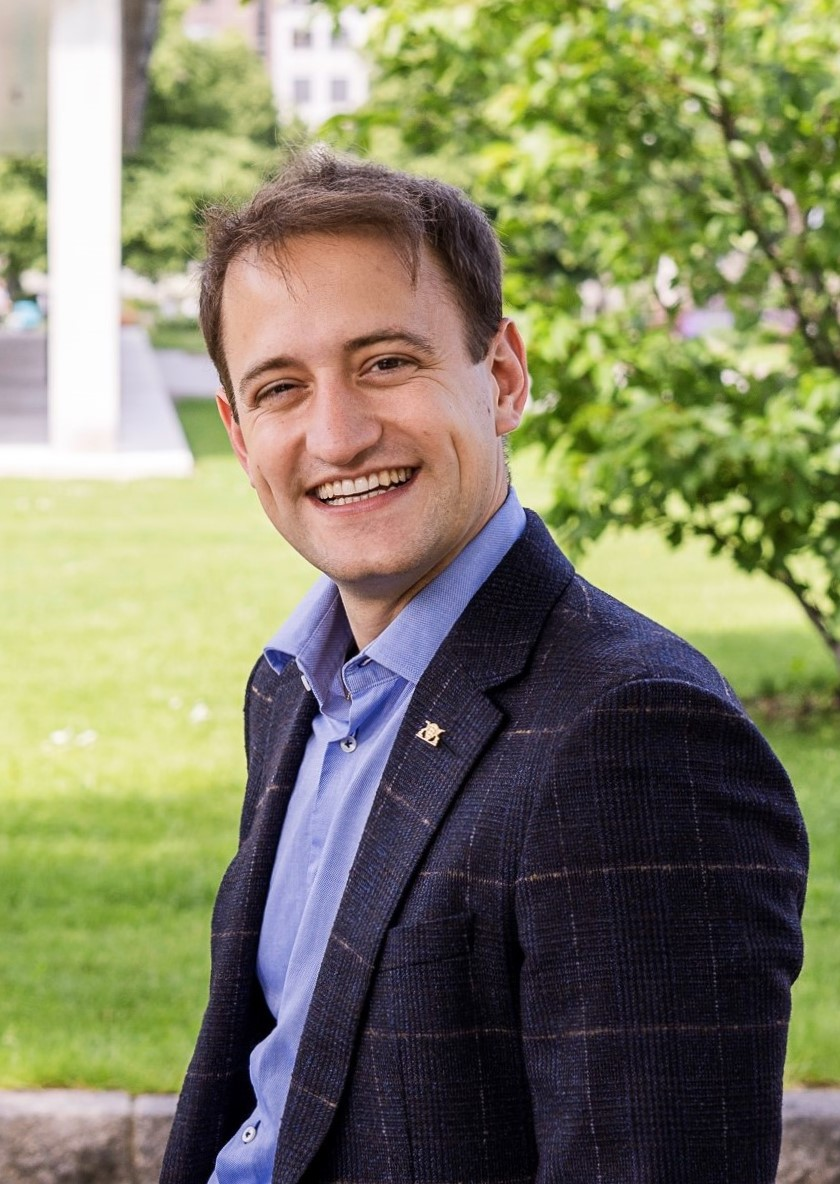
- Miller in 2021

Member of the Landtag of Baden-Württemberg
- Incumbent
- Assumed office 11 May 2021
- Constituency: Böblingen

Personal details
- Born: 10 March 1991 (age 35) Ochsenhausen
- Party: Christian Democratic Union
- Parent: Wolfgang Miller (father)

Matthias Miller (born 10 March 1991 in Ochsenhausen) is a German politician serving as a member of the Landtag of Baden-Württemberg since 2021. He has served as chairman of the Christian Democratic Union in Böblingen since 2021.
