= Jakob Neber =

German politician (1891–1968)

Member of the Bundestag
- In office September 7, 1949 – September 7, 1953

Personal details
- Born: 29 January 1891
- Died: June 23, 1968 (aged 77)
- Party: CDU

Jakob Neber (January 29, 1891 – June 23, 1968) was a German politician of the Christian Democratic Union (CDU) and former member of the German Bundestag.

== Life ==
Neber was a member of the first German Bundestag from 1949 to 1953, into which he was elected for the CDU via the Rhineland-Palatinate state list.

== Literature ==
Herbst, Ludolf; Jahn, Bruno (2002). Vierhaus, Rudolf (ed.). Biographisches Handbuch der Mitglieder des Deutschen Bundestages. 1949–2002 [Biographical Handbook of the Members of the German Bundestag. 1949–2002] (in German). München: De Gruyter - De Gruyter Saur. p. 1715. ISBN 978-3-11-184511-1.
