= Seyran Papo =

German politician (born 1988)

Member of the Landtag of Schleswig-Holstein
- Incumbent
- Assumed office 7 June 2022
- Preceded by: Bernd Heinemann
- Constituency: Kiel-Ost

Personal details
- Born: 7 April 1988 (age 38) Cizre, Turkey
- Party: Christian Democratic Union
- Other political affiliations: Die Linke (formerly)

Seyran Papo (born 7 April 1988 in Cizre) is a Kurdish - German politician serving as a member of the Landtag of Schleswig-Holstein since 2022. She is the spokesperson for integration and migration of the Christian Democratic Union in Kiel.
