= Clemens Nieting =

German politician

Clemens Nieting (born 28 May 1964, Kiel, West Germany) is a former German politician in Hamburg, part of the Christian Democratic Union of Germany.

== Life and politics ==
Since 1989, Nieting was full-time employed as an organization consultant for the CDU party headquarters in Hamburg. He was initially county deputy for the district assembly of Hamburg-Nord and most recently as the chairman of this group. From March 2004 to March 2005, he was a member of the Hamburg Parliament. During this tenure in parliament, he was a member of the European Committee.

Nieting resigned from his position in March 2005 after the prosecutors office of Hamburg initiated investigations against him for possession and dissemination of child pornography. In July 2005, an Amtsgericht in Hamburg convicted him for possessing and disseminating child pornography, of which Nieting accepted, and was sentenced to seven months in prison and subsequent probation for an undisclosed amount of time, in addition to a fine of 2500 €. As a result of his conviction, the CDU party headquarters relieved Nieting of his services in August 2005 by mutual consent of Nieting.
