= Maximilian Bathon =

German politician (born 1991)

Member of the Landtag of Hesse
- Incumbent
- Assumed office 18 January 2024
- Preceded by: Esther Kalveram
- Constituency: Kassel-Stadt II

Personal details
- Born: 16 January 1991 (age 35)
- Party: Christian Democratic Union

Maximilian Bathon (born 16 January 1991) is a German politician serving as a member of the Landtag of Hesse since 2024. He has served as chairman of the Christian Democratic Union in Kassel since 2024.
