= Gerhard Kleinmagd =

German politician (1937–2010)

Gerhard Kleinmagd (7 November 1937; Hamburg – 17 November 2010) is a German politician, former member of the Christian Democratic Union, then member of the Social Democratic Party of Germany. Kleinmagd was member of the Hamburg Parliament for the CDU between 1982 and 1993, and for the borough parliament of Eimsbüttel for the SPD until 2008.
