= Hartmut Schwesinger =

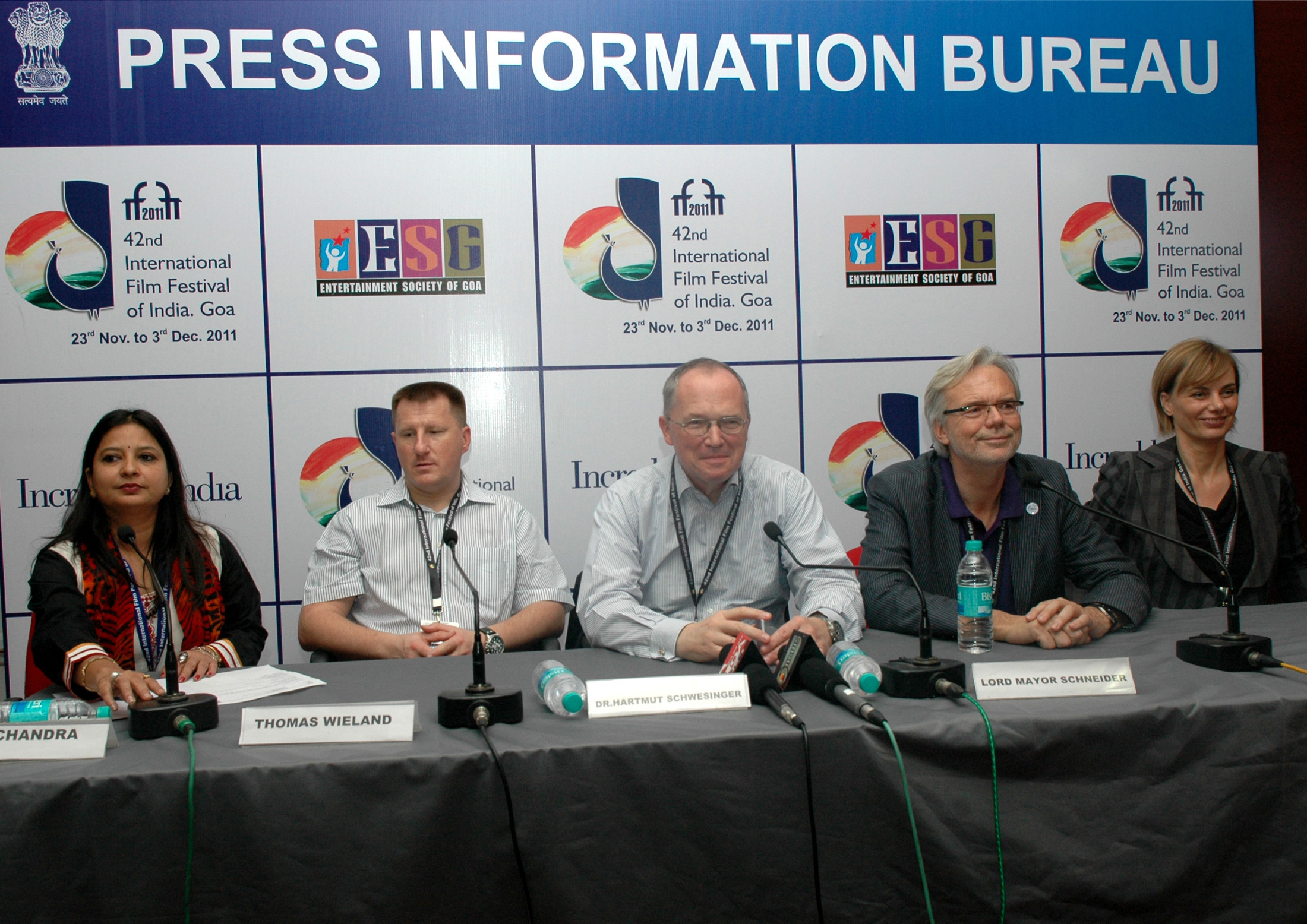
- Schwesinger at IFFI 2011
- Born: August 3, 1949 (age 76); Hamburg, Germany
- Education: Ph.D in Chemistry
- Alma mater: University of Hamburg
- Occupation: Businessman
- Spouse: Heike Schwesinger
- Children: 2

Hartmut Schwesinger (born August 3, 1949, in Hamburg, Germany) is the president and CEO of FrankfurtRheinMain GmbH International Marketing of the Region, a company responsible for regional marketing of the Frankfurt/Rhine-Main Metropolitan Region.

Schwesinger studied chemistry at the University of Hamburg. He graduated in 1979 with a Ph.D in chemistry that he did in cooperation with the Department of Wood Science of the former Federal Research Centre for Forestry and Forest Products (since 2008 Johann Heinrich von Thünen Institute, Federal Research Institute of Rural Areas, Forestry and Fisheries).

From 1980 until 1993 he worked for the German Shell AG. Schwesinger started his career as a business assistant in the refinery Hamburg. From 1983 until 1985 he was a technologist in The Hague, then he worked in the sales and marketing department of German Shell AG. In 1991, Schwesinger became CEO of Helios Energieanlagen GmbH, an affiliated company of Shell AG for district heat and energy systems. From 1991 until 1993 he was a member of the Hamburg parliament. During his mandate, he was a member of the “harbour, economy and agriculture committee” and the “budget” committee for his party, the Christian Democratic Union).

In 1994, Schwesinger moved to Frankfurt and became president and CEO of Frankfurt Economic Development GmbH], the local development agency. Since August 2005, he has been the president and CEO of FrankfurtRheinMain GmbH International Marketing of the Region, which was established in the same year.
