= Sebastian Müller (politician) =

German politician (born 1988)

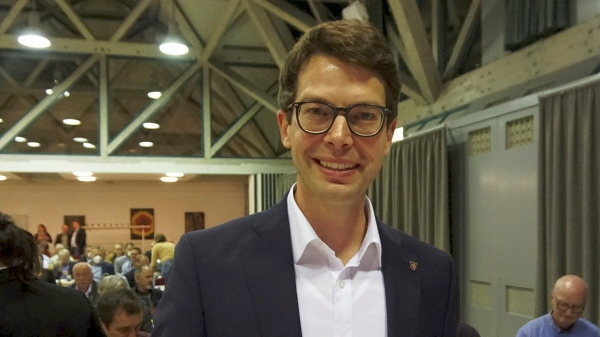
- Müller in 2022

Member of the Landtag of Hesse
- Incumbent
- Assumed office 1 July 2022
- Preceded by: Markus Meysner
- Constituency: Fulda II

Personal details
- Born: 25 April 1988 (age 38)
- Party: Christian Democratic Union

Sebastian Müller (born 25 April 1988) is a German politician serving as a member of the Landtag of Hesse since 2022. He has served as deputy chairman of the Christian Democratic Union in Hofbieber since 2018.
