= Wilma Glücklich =

German politician

Member of the Bundestag
- In office 1994–1998

Personal details
- Born: 18 September 1952 (age 73) Oelde, West Germany
- Party: CDU

Wilma Glücklich is a German politician of the Christian Democratic Union (CDU) and former member of the German Bundestag.

== Life ==
In 1974 Glücklich joined the CDU, where she became state chairwoman of the Women's Union and a member of the Berlin state executive committee. From 1994 to 1998 she was represented in the German Bundestag. She entered parliament via the Berlin state list.
