= Marco Schmitz =

German politician (born 1979)

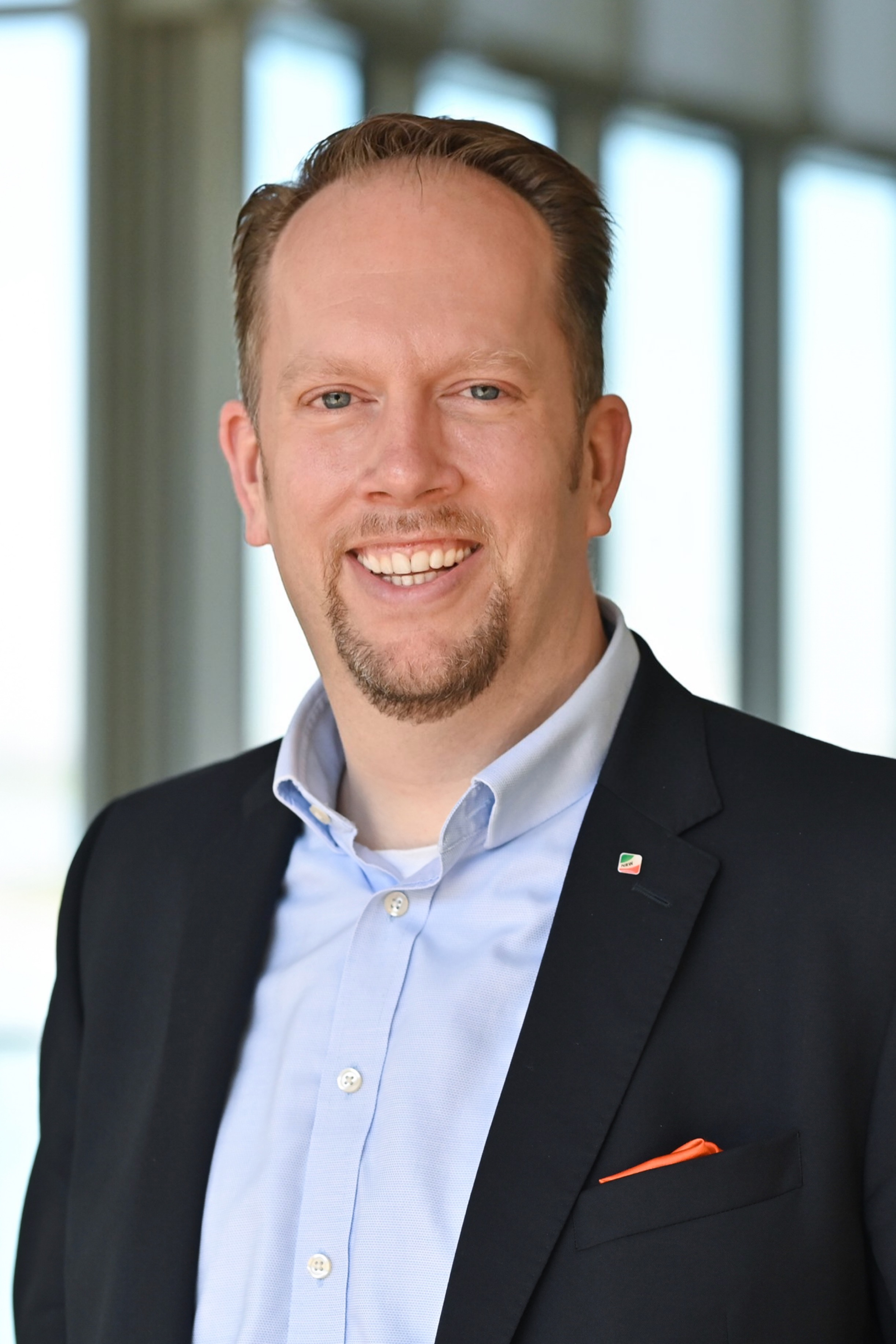
Marco Schmitz, 2022

Marco Schmitz (born 24 January 1979 in Düsseldorf) is a German politician serving as a member of the Landtag of North Rhine-Westphalia since 2017. He has served as chairman of the Christian Democratic Union in Borough 7 of Düsseldorf since 2017.

== Early life and education ==
After graduating from high school in 1999, Schmitz began a master’s program in political science, public law, and political education at Julius Maximilian University of Würzburg, successfully completing it in 2007 with a Master of Arts. He then returned to his hometown Düsseldorf and worked at the City Hall as an advisor to the Mayor Joachim Erwin, who died in office in May 2008 as a result of cancer. Schmitz remained at City Hall with Erwin’s successor, Dirk Elbers. From 2012 to 2014, he served as managing director of the Job Center in Düsseldorf. Starting in 2015, Schmitz served as administrative director at the German Association of Cities until he won a direct seat in the 2017 state election of northrhine westphalia with 35.2%

Marco Schmitz is married and has two sons. He lives with his family in the Gerresheim district of Düsseldorf.

== Political Career ==
During the 17th legislative session of the state parliament of Northrine-Westphalia, he served as vice-chair of the Committee on Labor, Health and Social Affairs and as his parliamentary group’s spokesperson on the COVID-19 Pandemic Subcommittee. He was also a member of the Committees on Home Affairs, Local Government, Construction, Housing and Digitalization.

In the 2022 state election of Northrine-Westphalia, he was re-elected directly to the state parliament with 31.3%. In the 18th legislative session, Schmitz is the spokesperson for the CDU parliamentary group on the Committee on Labor, Health, and Social Affairs (AGS). In this capacity, he also serves as chairman of the board of trustees of the SozialstiftungNRW (formerly the Stiftung Wohlfahrtspflege NRW). Schmitz is also a member of the Committee on Construction, Housing, and Digitalization, the Election Review Committee, and Parliamentary Investigation Committee III (Bridge Disaster and Infrastructure). In addition, he is a deputy member of the Subcommittee of the Budget and Finance Committee and the Senior Council.

Marco Schmitz joined the CDU in 1997. Before becoming a member of the state parliament, he served first as vice chair and, starting in 2015, as chair of the CDU Düsseldorf-Gerresheim. Since 2014, he has also served on the CDU’s Düsseldorf district executive committee as membership officer. In 2017, he assumed the role of membership officer and chair of the CDU City District Association 7, which includes the districts of Gerresheim, Knittkuhl, Grafenberg, Hubbelrath, and Ludenberg. In addition, he served as a member of District Council 7 of the City of Düsseldorf from 2004 to 2007 and from 2014 to 2017.

Within the CDU, Schmitz is a member of the Christian Democratic Workers’ Association (CDA), the party’s social wing. As chairman of the Bergisches Land district, he also serves as an assessor on the state executive committee of the CDA North Rhine-Westphalia.
