= Willy Massoth =

German politician (1911–1978)

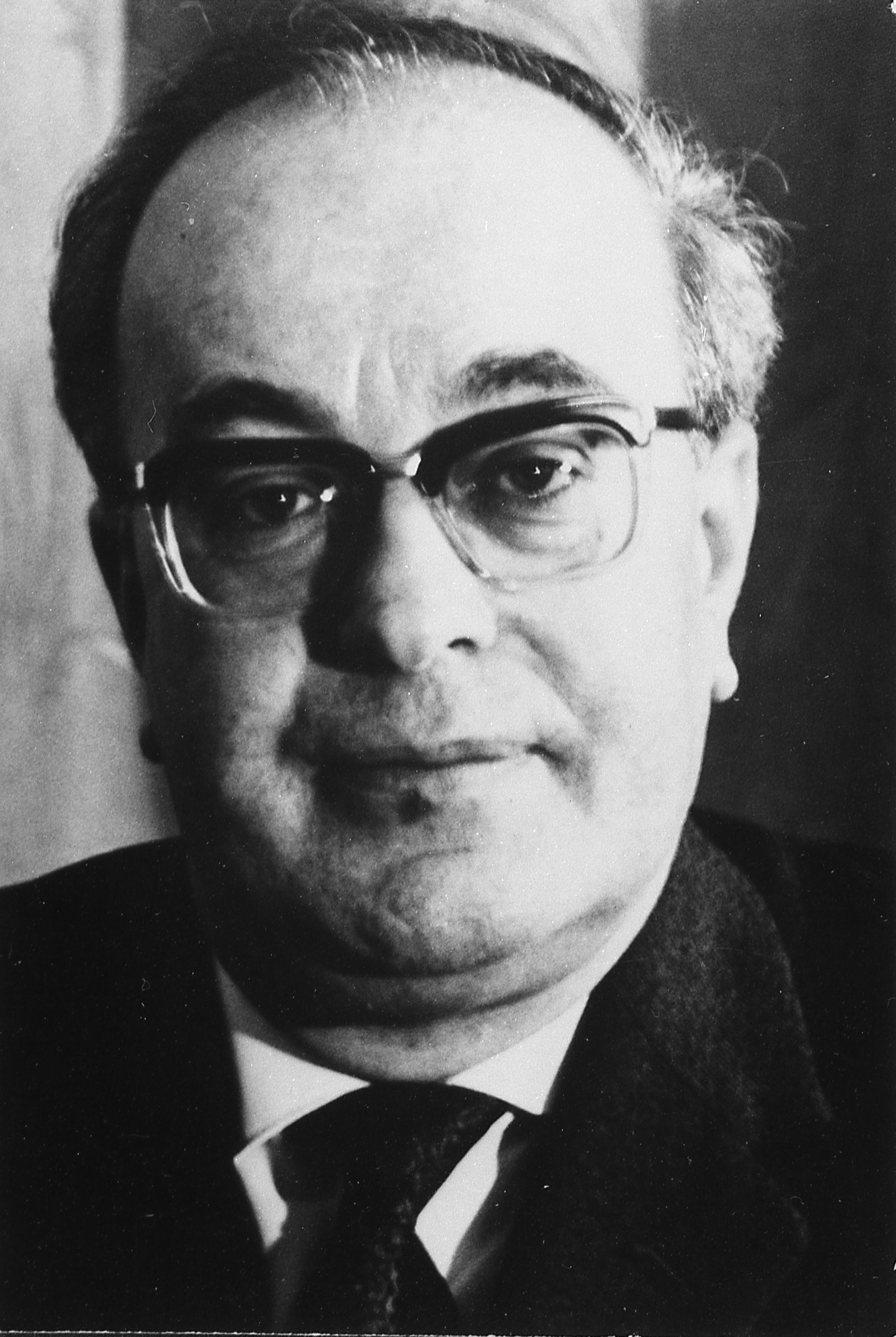
- Willy Massoth 1965

Member of the Bundestag
- In office 7 September 1949 – 6 October 1957

Personal details
- Born: 1 January 1911
- Died: 21 November 1978 (aged 67)
- Party: CDU

Willy Massoth (1 January 1911 – 21 November 1978) was a German politician of the Christian Democratic Union (CDU) and former member of the German Bundestag.

== Life ==
After the end of the war, Massoth joined the CDU and from 1945 to 1949 he was managing director of the CDU district association in Offenbach am Main. In addition, he was state chairman of the Junge Union Hessen from 1946 to 1953. From 1946 to 1948 Massoth was a member of the Offenbach district council. He had been a member of the German Bundestag since its first election from 1949 to 1957. He entered the parliament via the state list of the CDU Hessen.

== Literature ==
Herbst, Ludolf; Jahn, Bruno (2002). Vierhaus, Rudolf (ed.). Biographisches Handbuch der Mitglieder des Deutschen Bundestages. 1949–2002 [Biographical Handbook of the Members of the German Bundestag. 1949–2002] (in German). München: De Gruyter - De Gruyter Saur. p. 1715. ISBN 978-3-11-184511-1.
