= Hildegard Bleyler =

German politician (1899–1984)

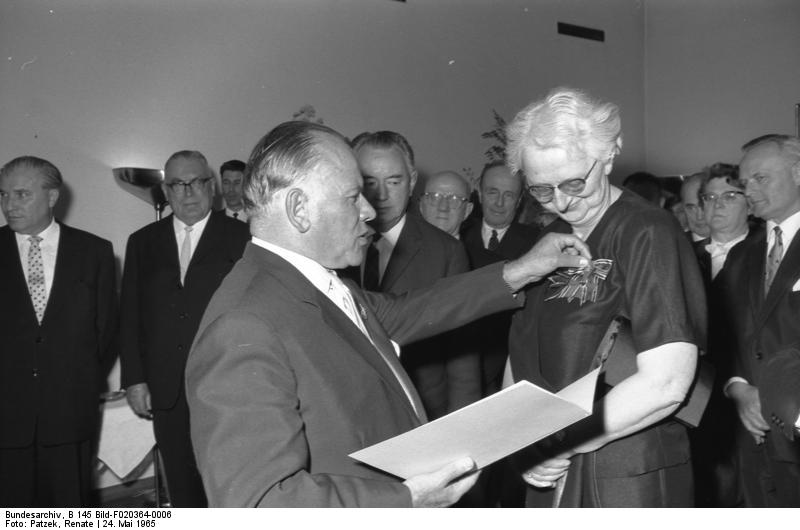
- Hildegard Bleyler receives the Federal Cross of Merit from Eugen Gerstenmaier in 1965

Member of the Bundestag
- In office 6 October 1953 – 17 October 1965

Personal details
- Born: 12 November 1899 Altkirch
- Died: 6 February 1984 (aged 84) Freiburg im Breisgau, Baden-Württemberg, Germany
- Party: CDU

Hildegard Bleyler (November 12, 1899 – February 6, 1984) was a German politician of the Christian Democratic Union (CDU) and former member of the German Bundestag.

== Life ==
From 1945 onwards, she participated in the building of the CDU. She became chairwoman of the regional women's advisory council of the Baden CDU and member of the regional executive committee. She was a member of the German Bundestag from 1953 to 1965.

== Literature ==
Herbst, Ludolf; Jahn, Bruno (2002). Vierhaus, Rudolf (ed.). Biographisches Handbuch der Mitglieder des Deutschen Bundestages. 1949–2002 [Biographical Handbook of the Members of the German Bundestag. 1949–2002] (in German). München: De Gruyter - De Gruyter Saur. p. 1715. ISBN 978-3-11-184511-1.
