= Lucas Schmitz =

German politician (born 1994)

Member of the Landtag of Hesse
- Incumbent
- Assumed office 18 January 2024

Personal details
- Born: 8 July 1994 (age 31) Gießen
- Party: Christian Democratic Union (since 2013)

Lucas Schmitz (born 8 July 1994 in Gießen) is a German politician serving as a member of the Landtag of Hesse since 2024. From 2017 to 2019, he served as chairman of the Young Union in Giessen.
