= Peter Blumenrath =

German politician (born 1984)

Member of the Landtag of North Rhine-Westphalia
- Incumbent
- Assumed office 1 June 2022
- Preceded by: Peter Preuß
- Constituency: Düsseldorf IV

Personal details
- Born: 27 June 1984 (age 42)
- Party: Christian Democratic Union (since 2003)

Peter Blumenrath (born 27 June 1984) is a German politician serving as a member of the Landtag of North Rhine-Westphalia since 2022. He is the chairman of the Christian Democratic Union in Wersten.
