= Sophie Ramdor =

German politician (born 1992)

Member of the Landtag of Lower Saxony
- Incumbent
- Assumed office 8 November 2022

Personal details
- Born: 23 July 1992 (age 33)
- Party: Christian Democratic Union (since 2013)

Sophie Ramdor (born 23 July 1992) is a German politician serving as a member of the Landtag of Lower Saxony since 2022. She has been a member of the Christian Democratic Union since 2013.
