= Hendrik Schmitz =

German politician (born 1978)

Member of the Landtag of North Rhine-Westphalia
- Incumbent
- Assumed office 13 June 2019
- Preceded by: Holger Müller
- Constituency: Aachen III (2022–present)
- In office 31 May 2012 – 31 May 2017

Personal details
- Born: 6 April 1978 (age 48) Aachen
- Party: Christian Democratic Union (since 1997)
- Parent: Hans Peter Schmitz (father)

Hendrik Schmitz (born 6 April 1978 in Aachen) is a German politician. He has been a member of the Landtag of North Rhine-Westphalia since 2019, having previously served from 2012 to 2017. He has served as chairman of the Christian Democratic Union in Aachen Land since 2017.
