= Jochen Feilcke =

German politician

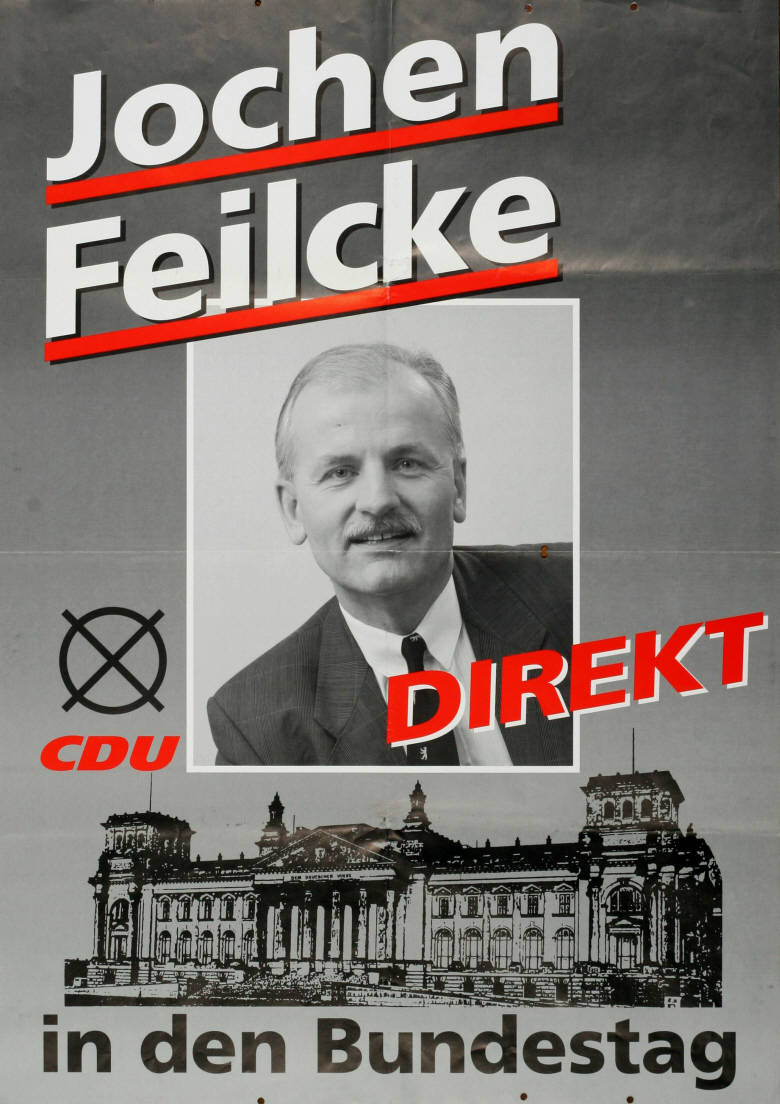
- Candidate poster of Jochen Feilckes for the 1994 federal election

Member of the Bundestag
- In office 1983–1998

Personal details
- Born: 19 August 1942 (age 83) Hannover, West Germany (now Germany)
- Party: CDU

Jochen Feilcke is a German politician of the Christian Democratic Union (CDU) and former member of the German Bundestag.

== Life ==
In 1964 Feilcke became a member of the CDU. From 1967 to 1971 he was initially a member of the Junge Union Berlin-Schöneberg, from 1970 to 1982 he was chairman of the local association Innsbrucker Platz, in 1977 he became chairman of the district association Schöneberg and in 1981 he became a member of the regional board of the CDU Berlin. From 1975 to 1983, Feilcke was a member of the German Bundestag from 1983 to 1998.
