= Renate Diemers =

German politician

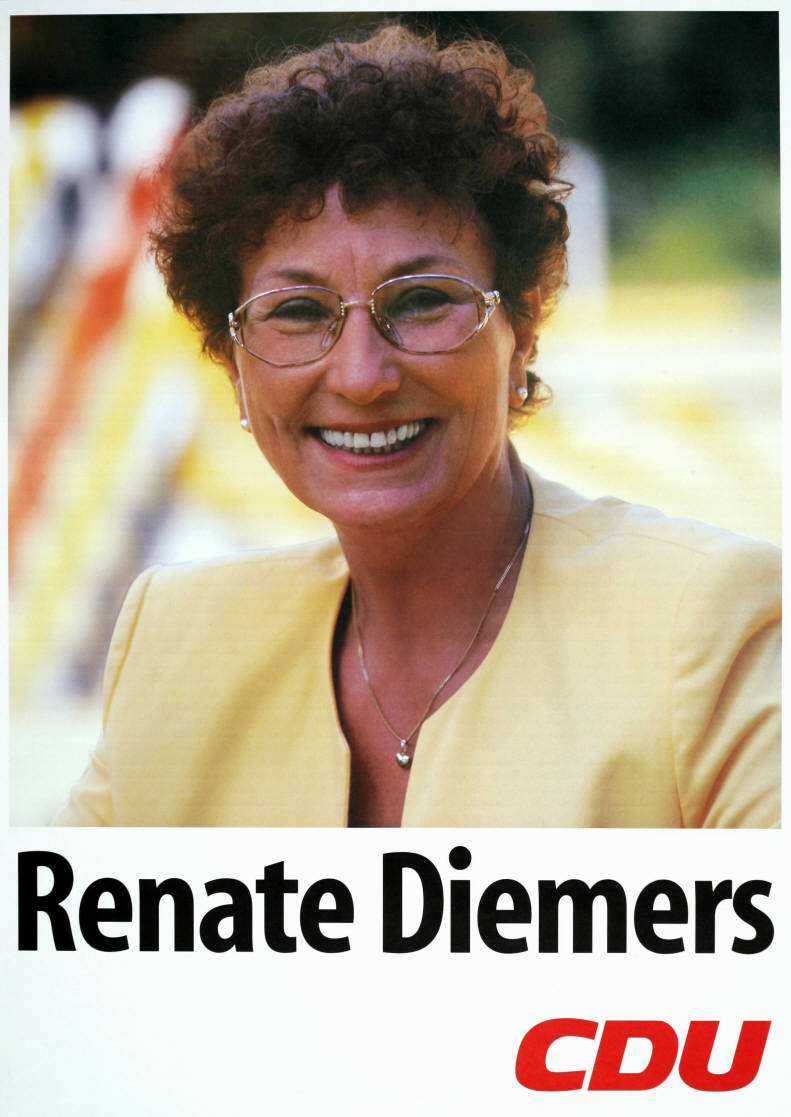
- Renate Diemers' candidate poster for the 1998 federal election

Member of the Bundestag
- In office 1990–2002

Personal details
- Born: 8 April 1938 (age 88) Werdohl, West Germany (now Germany)
- Party: CDU

Renate Diemers was a German politician of the Christian Democratic Union (CDU) and former member of the German Bundestag.

== Life ==
She joined the CDU in 1966 and the CDA in 1973. From 1990 to 2002 she was a member of the German Bundestag. During her time as a member of parliament, she was a member of the Committee on Family, Senior Citizens, Women and Youth, the Committee on Post and Telecommunications and the Enquete Commission on Demographic Change.
