= Ferdinand Breidbach =

German politician

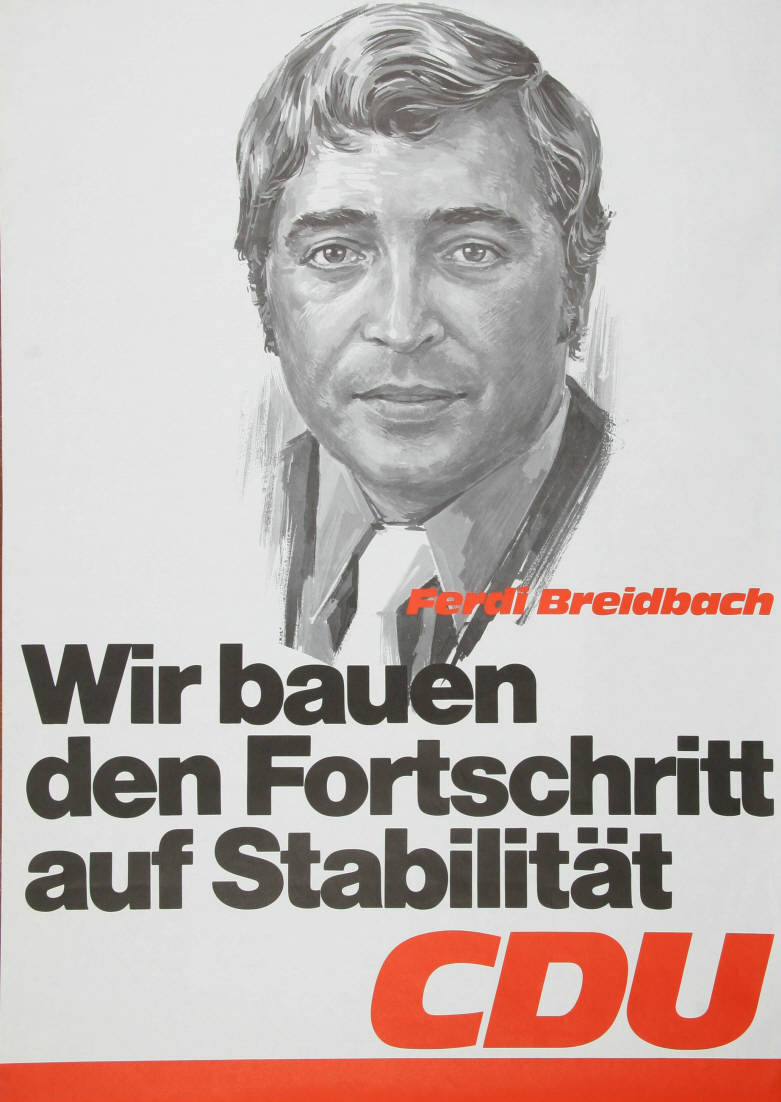
- Ferdi Breidbach on a campaign poster for the 1972 federal elections

Member of the Bundestag
- In office 20 October 1969 – 4 November 1980

Personal details
- Born: 3 May 1938 (age 87) Langenberg, Germany
- Party: CDU

Ferdinand Breidbach (born 3 May 1938) was a German politician of the Christian Democratic Union (CDU) and former member of the German Bundestag.

== Life ==
Breidbach has been a member of the CDU since 1956. From 1962 to 1968, he was state chairman of the Young Workers' Union and subsequently became chairman of the CDU social committees in the Ruhr district. In the 1969 federal elections Breidbach was elected to the German Bundestag, of which he was a member until 1980. He had always entered parliament via the state list of the CDU North Rhine-Westphalia. There he was a member of the economic committee.

== Literature ==
Herbst, Ludolf; Jahn, Bruno (2002). Vierhaus, Rudolf (ed.). Biographisches Handbuch der Mitglieder des Deutschen Bundestages. 1949–2002 [Biographical Handbook of the Members of the German Bundestag. 1949–2002] (in German). München: De Gruyter - De Gruyter Saur. p. 1715. ISBN 978-3-11-184511-1.
