= Theresa Gröninger =

German politician (born 1993)

Member of the Bürgerschaft of Bremen
- Incumbent
- Assumed office 29 June 2023

Personal details
- Born: 16 January 1993 (age 33)
- Party: Christian Democratic Union

Theresa Gröninger (born 16 January 1993) is a German politician serving as a member of the Bürgerschaft of Bremen since 2023. She was a candidate for the Bundestag in the 2017 and 2021 elections.
