= Hans Watzke =

German politician (1932–2014)

Hans Watzke (4 March 1932 – 29 August 2014) was a German politician of the Christian Democratic Union (CDU). From 1975 to 1990 he was a member of the Landtag of North Rhine-Westphalia.

== Early life ==
Watzke was born in Bochum. He and his mother settled in Erlinghausen in the Sauerland region after World War II, and in 1950 he finished an apprenticeship as a bricklayer. Later, he studied civil engineering at Staatliche Ingenieurschule für Bauwesen in Hagen, and graduated in 1958. After 1974 he was general manager of a construction company in based in Marsberg.

== Political career ==
Watzke was a member of CDU since 1958. From 1981 to 1985 he was chairman of the CDU district association for Hochsauerland. From 1969 to 1975 he was a member of the municipality counsel of Erlinghausen, now a part of Marsberg, from 1964 to 1975 he was district MP for the former Brilon district, and from 1969 to 1975 he was a member of the municipal association 'Landschaftsversammlung Westfalen-Lippe'. From 1984 he was a councillor of Marsberg and from 1979 to 1999 he was MP of the Hochsauerlandkreis district parliament.

From 28 May 1975 to 30 May 1990, Watzke was member of parliament in the state parliament of North Rhine-Westphalia. He was elected for constituency No. 134 Brilon in the eighth period and for constituency No. 143 Hochsauerlandkreis II in the ninth and tenth period respectively.

In 1990 he was awarded the Order of Merit of the Federal Republic of Germany. Hans Watzke died in August 2014 in Erlinghausen at age 82.

== Personal life ==
Watzke is the father of entrepreneur and former association football official Hans-Joachim Watzke.
