= Günther Hochgartz =

- Born: 10 July 1918; Bocholt, German Empire
- Died: 10 October 2005 (aged 87); Bocholt, Germany
- Awards: Knight's Cross of the Iron Cross

Günther Hochgartz (10 July 1918 – 10 October 2005) was a West German politician. During World War II, he served as an officer in the Wehrmacht of Nazi Germany and was decorated with the Knight's Cross of the Iron Cross.

== Awards and decorations ==
- Knight's Cross of the Iron Cross on 15 April 1944 as Hauptmann and Leader of the II./Grenadier-Regiment 187
