= Tina Trompter =

German politician (born 2001)

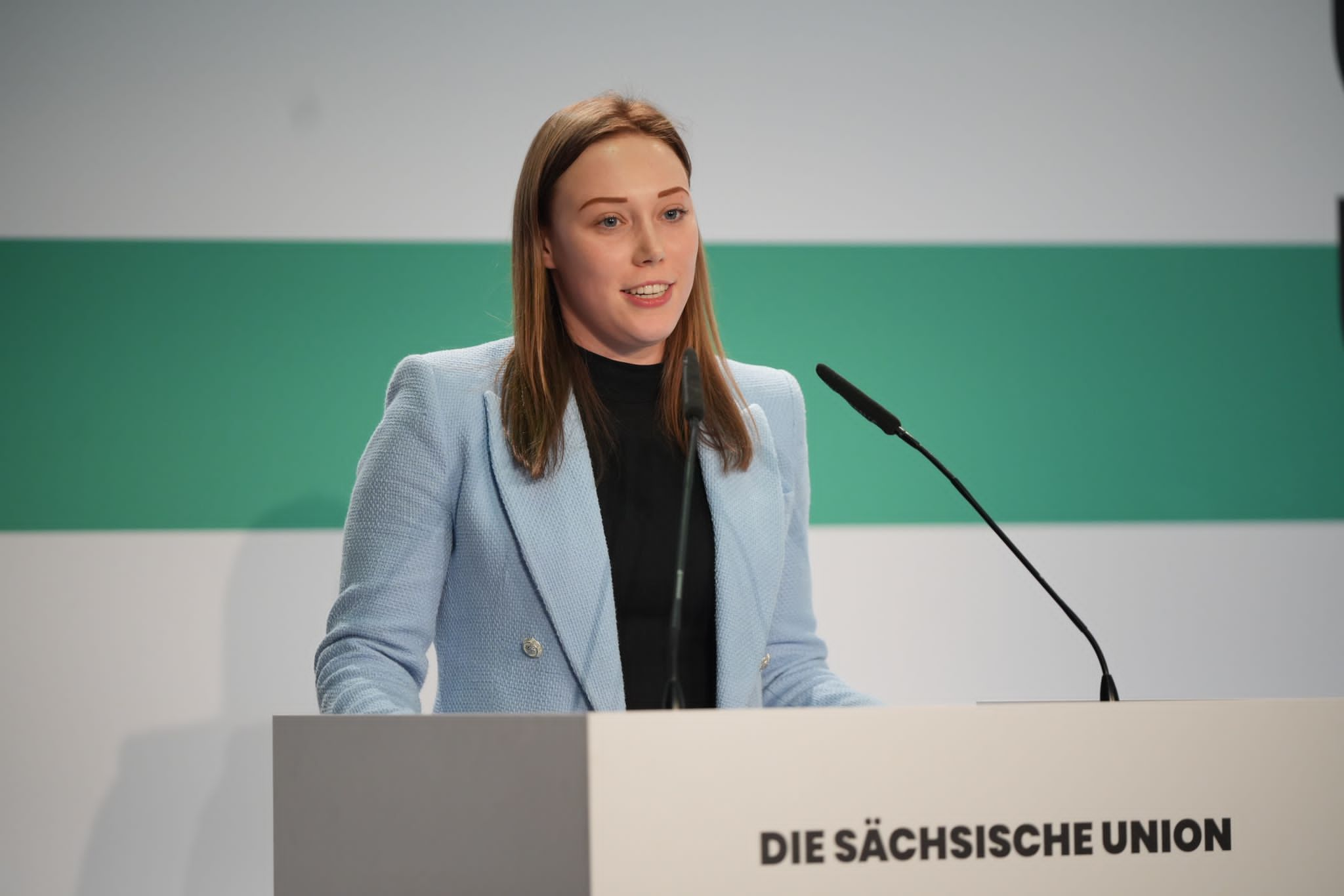
- Trompter in 2024

Member of the Landtag of Saxony
- Incumbent
- Assumed office 1 September 2024
- Preceded by: Jörg Kiesewetter
- Constituency: Nordsachsen 1

Personal details
- Born: 6 February 2001 (age 25)
- Party: Christian Democratic Union (since 2017)

Tina Trompter (born 6 February 2001) is a German politician serving as a member of the Landtag of Saxony since 2024. She is the youngest current member of the Landtag.
