= Hartmut Büttner =

German politician

Member of the Bundestag
- In office 20 December 1990 – 18 October 2005

Personal details
- Born: 2 January 1952 (age 74) Kolenfeld, West Germany (now Germany)
- Party: CDU
- Children: 3

Hartmut Büttner (born 2 January 1952) is a German politician of the Christian Democratic Union (CDU) and former member of the German Bundestag.

== Life ==
In 1969 Büttner joined the Junge Union and in 1971 the CDU. From 1980 to 1983 he was state chairman of the Junge Union of Lower Saxony. Büttner was a member of the German Bundestag for four terms from 20 December 1990. He twice won a direct mandate in his constituency (1990 and 1994) and was twice elected to parliament on the state list of Saxony-Anhalt (1998 and 2002).
