= Lena-Sophie Laue =

German politician (born 1997)

Member of the Landtag of Lower Saxony
- Incumbent
- Assumed office 26 September 2024

Personal details
- Born: 8 February 1997 (age 29)
- Party: Christian Democratic Union (since 2015)

Lena-Sophie Laue (born 8 February 1997) is a German politician serving as a member of the Landtag of Lower Saxony since 2024. She has been a city councillor of Ummern since 2021.
