= Hans-Dirk Bierling =

German politician

Member of the Bundestag
- In office 20 December 1990 – 17 October 2002

Personal details
- Born: 29 March 1944 (age 82) Wernigerode, East Germany (now Germany)
- Party: CDU

Hans-Dirk Bierling is a German politician of the Christian Democratic Union (CDU) and former member of the German Bundestag.

== Life ==
From 18 March to 2 October 1990, he was a member of the Volkskammer, where he was chairman of the CDU/DA parliamentary group's working group on German, foreign, defence and development policy. He was a member of the Committee on German Unity and the Committee on Foreign Affairs. After reunification he became a member of the German Bundestag in 1990. He was a member of the Committee on Foreign Affairs, various subcommittees and a member of the German Bundestag delegations to the NATO and OSCE Parliamentary Assemblies. He retired from politics in 2002.
