= Bernadette Weyland =

German lawyer and politician

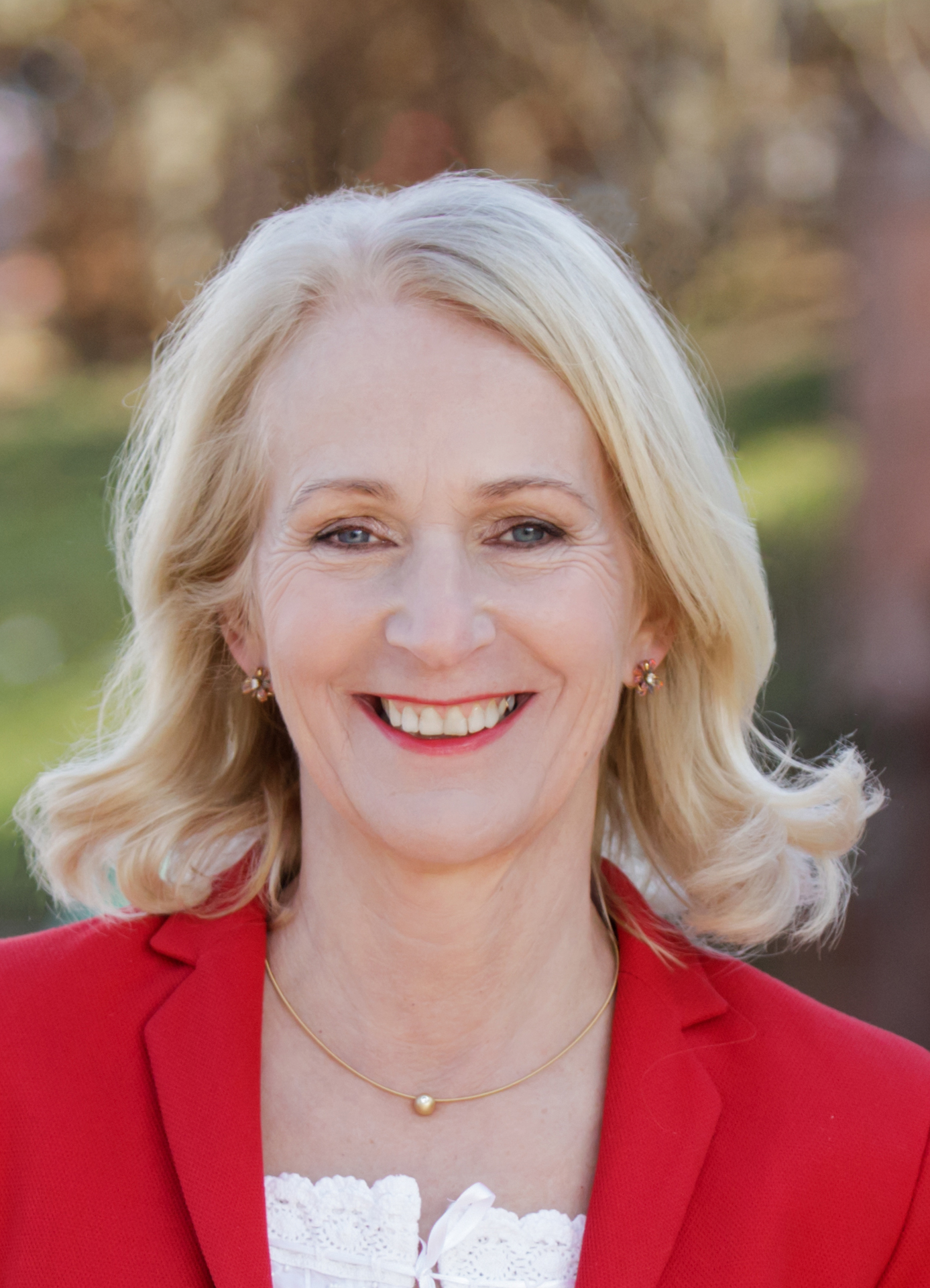
Bernadette Weyland (2017)

Bernadette Weyland (born 29 October 1957 in Münster) is a German lawyer and politician of the Christian Democratic Union of Germany. She served as President of the city council of Frankfurt from 2011 to 2014, as Secretary of State in the Ministry of Finance of Hesse from 2014 to 2017, and was her party's mayoral candidate in Frankfurt in the 2018 mayoral election.

She studied finance and law, and was called to the bar in 1988. In 1989 she earned a doctorate in law at the University of Freiburg. She worked for a law firm before she moved to the United States. Upon returning she became a lecturer in law at the Savings Bank Academy in Frankfurt. In 1996 she joined the Christian Democratic Union and became involved in local politics in Frankfurt. She was elected to the Frankfurt city council in 2006 and served as President of the city council from 2011 to 2014.
