= Oskar Wackerzapp =

German politician

Member of the Bundestag
- In office 7 September 1949 – 7 September 1953

Personal details
- Born: 12 March 1883
- Died: 8 August 1965 (aged 82)
- Party: CDU

Oskar Wackerzapp (March 12, 1883 – August 8, 1965) was a German politician of the Christian Democratic Union (CDU) and former member of the German Bundestag.

== Life ==
In 1949 he was elected to the German Bundestag, of which he was a member in the first legislative period until 1953.

== Literature ==
Herbst, Ludolf; Jahn, Bruno (2002). Vierhaus, Rudolf (ed.). Biographisches Handbuch der Mitglieder des Deutschen Bundestages. 1949–2002 [Biographical Handbook of the Members of the German Bundestag. 1949–2002] (in German). München: De Gruyter - De Gruyter Saur. p. 1715. ISBN 978-3-11-184511-1.
