= Manfred Groh =

German politician

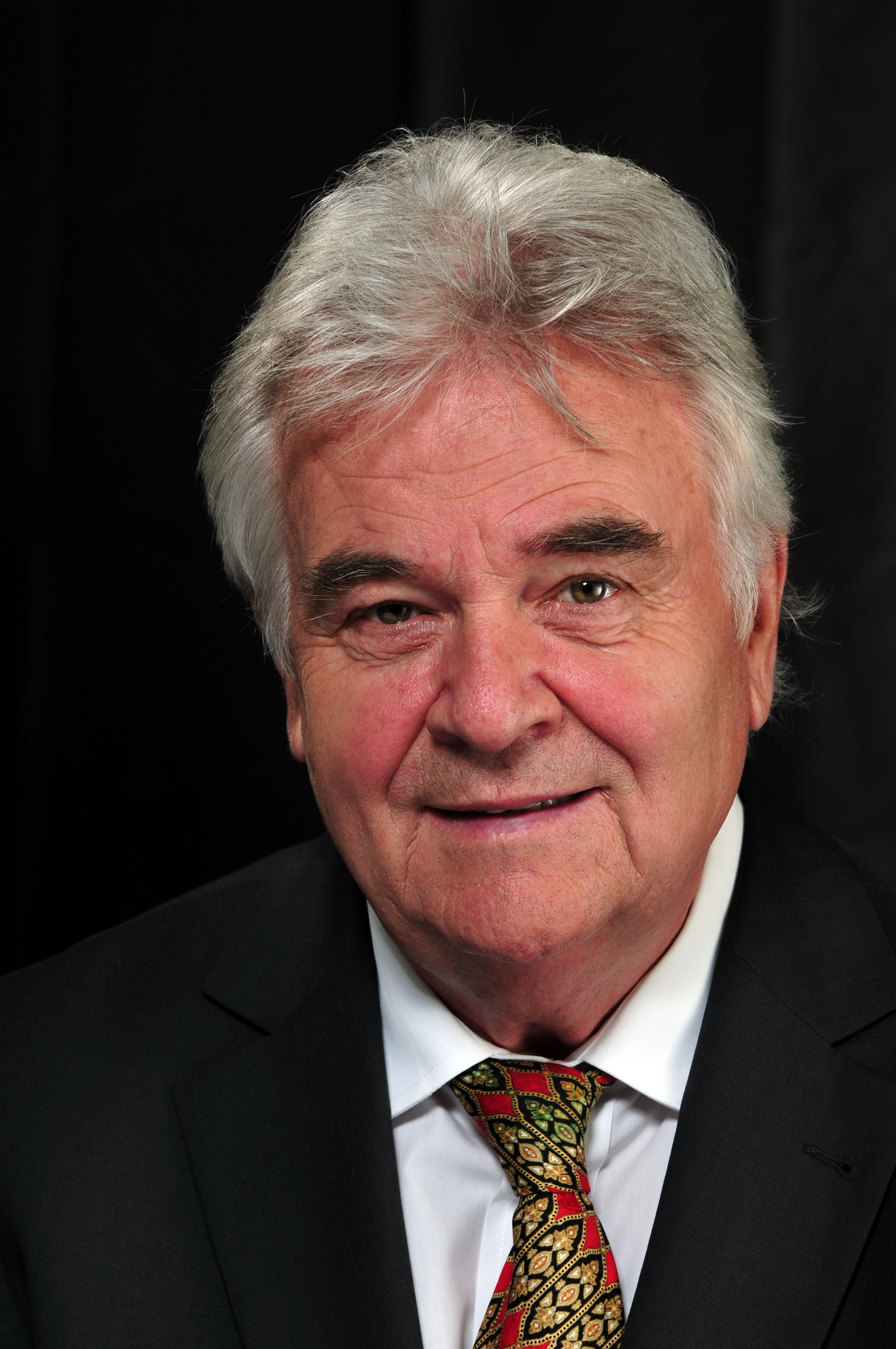
- Manfred Groh 2013
- Incumbent
- Assumed office 2006

Personal details
- Born: 23 December 1948 (age 77) Karlsruhe, Germany
- Party: CDU

Manfred Groh (23 December 1948) is a German CDU politician.

== Life and profession ==
Groh was born in Karlsruhe. After completing his initial education, he trained as a local administrator for the area of Baden-Württemberg. In 1970, he completed his education with a Diplom-Finanzwirts (FH) (Finance diploma). He was subsequently active in various state authorities. From 1994 until 2000, he was a Prokurist (authorized officer) in the state-owned parking company (Parkraumgesellschaft).

== Political activities ==
In 1999, Manfred Groh was elected to the Karlsruhe municipal council (Gemeinerat) and served for a year. He was also on the board of the CDU Karlsruhe as well as a member of the Region Mittlerer Oberrhein associated assembly (Verbandsversammlung) since 1999. In 2005, he became chairman of the CDU faction in this assembly. From 2000 until 2006 he was the provost of the economy and finance department of the city of Karlsruhe. He was elected to the Landtag of Baden-Württemberg during the elections of 2006 and 2011. He currently represents the Landtagswahlkreis Karlsruhe I.

== Family and private life ==
Manfred Groh is Roman Catholic. He was married in 1971 and has one daughter.
