= Christian Giencke =

German politician (1896–1967)

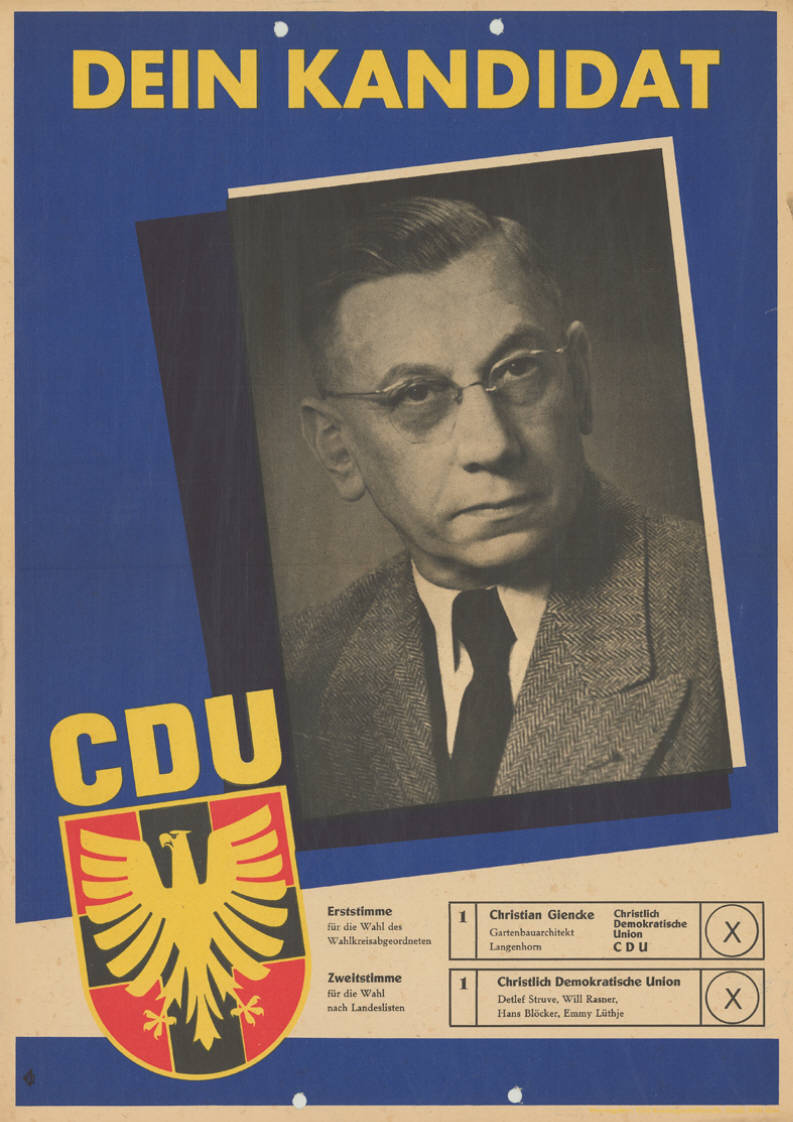
- Election poster 1957

Member of the Bundestag
- In office 7 September 1949 – 17 October 1965

Personal details
- Born: 9 June 1896 Langenhorn
- Died: 19 May 1967 (aged 70) Bad Godesberg, North Rhine-Westphalia, Germany
- Party: CDU

Christian Giencke (June 9, 1896 – May 19, 1967) was a German politician of the Christian Democratic Union (CDU) and former member of the German Bundestag.

== Life ==
Giencke, who joined the CDU after 1945, had been its chairman in the Husum district since 1947.

From 1949 to 1965 he was a member of the German Bundestag, into which he always moved as a directly elected member of parliament for the constituency Husum - Südtondern - Eiderstedt.

== Literature ==
Herbst, Ludolf; Jahn, Bruno (2002). Vierhaus, Rudolf (ed.). Biographisches Handbuch der Mitglieder des Deutschen Bundestages. 1949–2002 [Biographical Handbook of the Members of the German Bundestag. 1949–2002] (in German). München: De Gruyter - De Gruyter Saur. p. 1715. ISBN 978-3-11-184511-1.
