= Stefan Ruland =

German politician (born 1980)

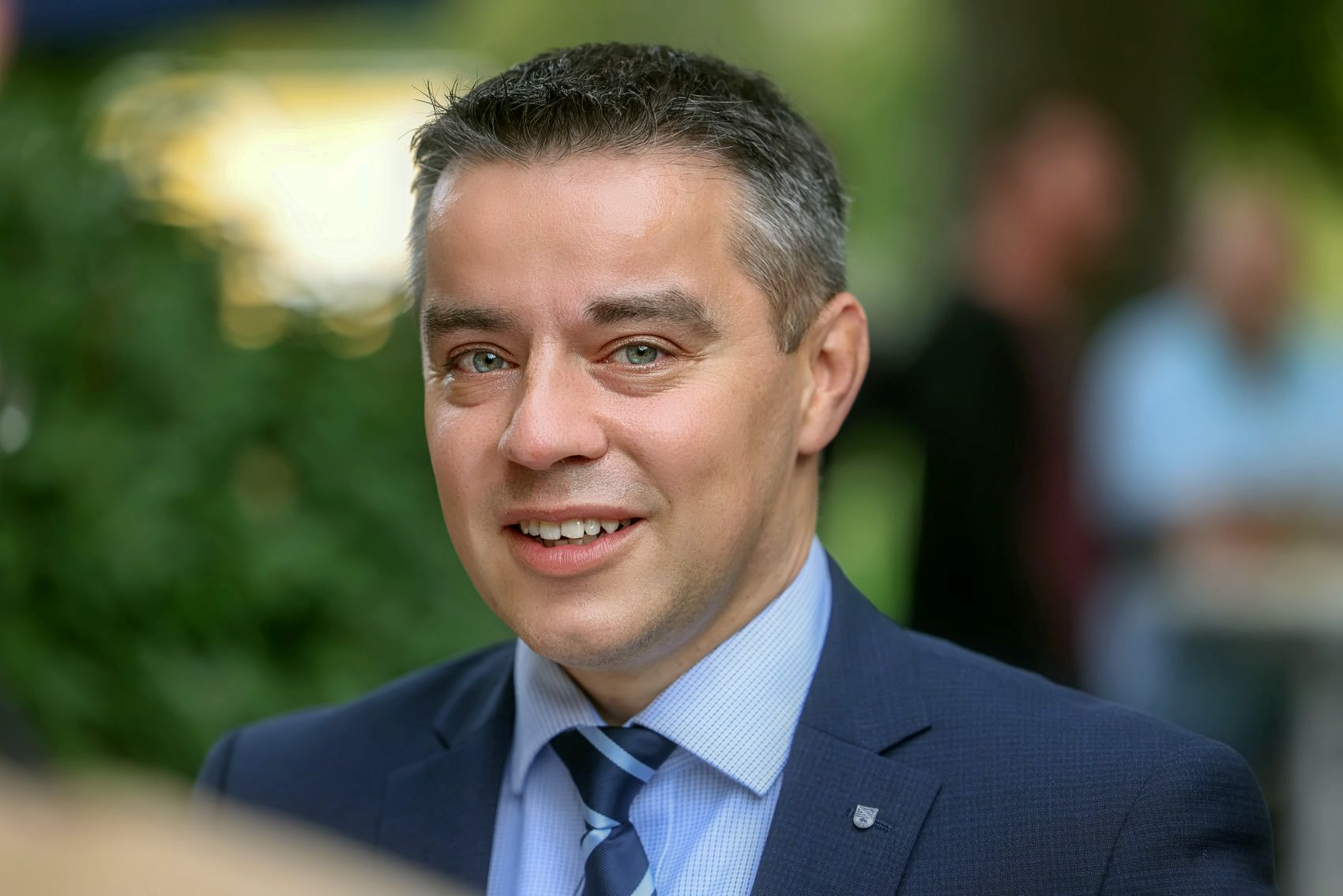
- Ruland in 2021

Member of the Landtag of Saxony-Anhalt
- Incumbent
- Assumed office 6 June 2021
- Preceded by: Sarah Sauermann
- Constituency: Bernburg

Personal details
- Born: 26 October 1980 (age 45)
- Party: Christian Democratic Union (since 1999)

Stefan Ruland (born 26 October 1980) is a German politician serving as a member of the Landtag of Saxony-Anhalt since 2021. He has served as treasurer of the Christian Democratic Union in Saxony-Anhalt since 2025.
