= Ilse Schmidt =

German politician

Ilse Schmidt (11 September 1892 in Schwerin - 12 September 1964 in Heilbronn) was a German politician (German state party and CDU). In 1922, she became director of the Soziale Frauenschule (Social Women's School) in Rostock, 1929 full-time lecturer in political science, law and welfare and economics and social policy at the Frauenschule für Volkspflegerinnen (Women's School for Social Work) in Frankfurt am Main. As a speaker for women's issues in the CDU state party, she developed a commitment to women's politics: including in the Democratic Women's League of Germany (DFD), in the Social and Input Committee of the Schwerin Landtag, in the Legal Commission of the Central Women's Committee of the German Central Administration for Education.

== Literature ==
- Klaus Schwabe: Landtagswahl in Mecklenburg-Vorpommern 1946. Begleitheft zur Ausstellung im Landtag Mecklenburg-Vorpommern vom 28. August bis 20. Oktober 1996, Schwerin 1996
