= Josef Bugl =

German politician (1932–2023)

Member of the Bundestag
- In office 4 November 1980 – 18 February 1987

Personal details
- Born: 24 December 1932 Weiden in der Oberpfalz, Bavaria, Germany
- Died: 20 September 2023 (aged 90)
- Party: CDU

Josef Bugl (24 December 1932 – 20 September 2023) was a German politician of the Christian Democratic Union (CDU) and former member of the German Bundestag.

== Life ==
For the CDU, which he had joined in 1975, he was elected to the state parliament of Baden-Württemberg in 1976. There he represented the constituency of Mannheim I and was education policy spokesman for the CDU state parliamentary faction. From 1980 to 1987 he was a member of the German Bundestag.

== Death ==
Bugl died on 20 September 2023, at the age of 90.

== Honors and Recognition ==
- Cross of Merit on Ribbon, Federal Republic of Germany (1980)
- Cross of Merit 1st Class, Federal Republic of Germany (1986)
- Member of the European Academy of Sciences and Arts
- Active in civic society as chair of the Lions Club Mannheim–Rhein-Neckar and a leading figure in local museums and technology forums.

== Literature ==
Herbst, Ludolf; Jahn, Bruno (2002). Vierhaus, Rudolf (ed.). Biographisches Handbuch der Mitglieder des Deutschen Bundestages. 1949–2002 [Biographical Handbook of the Members of the German Bundestag. 1949–2002] (in German). München: De Gruyter - De Gruyter Saur. p. 1715. ISBN 978-3-11-184511-1.
