= Anna Bauseneick =

German politician (born 1991)

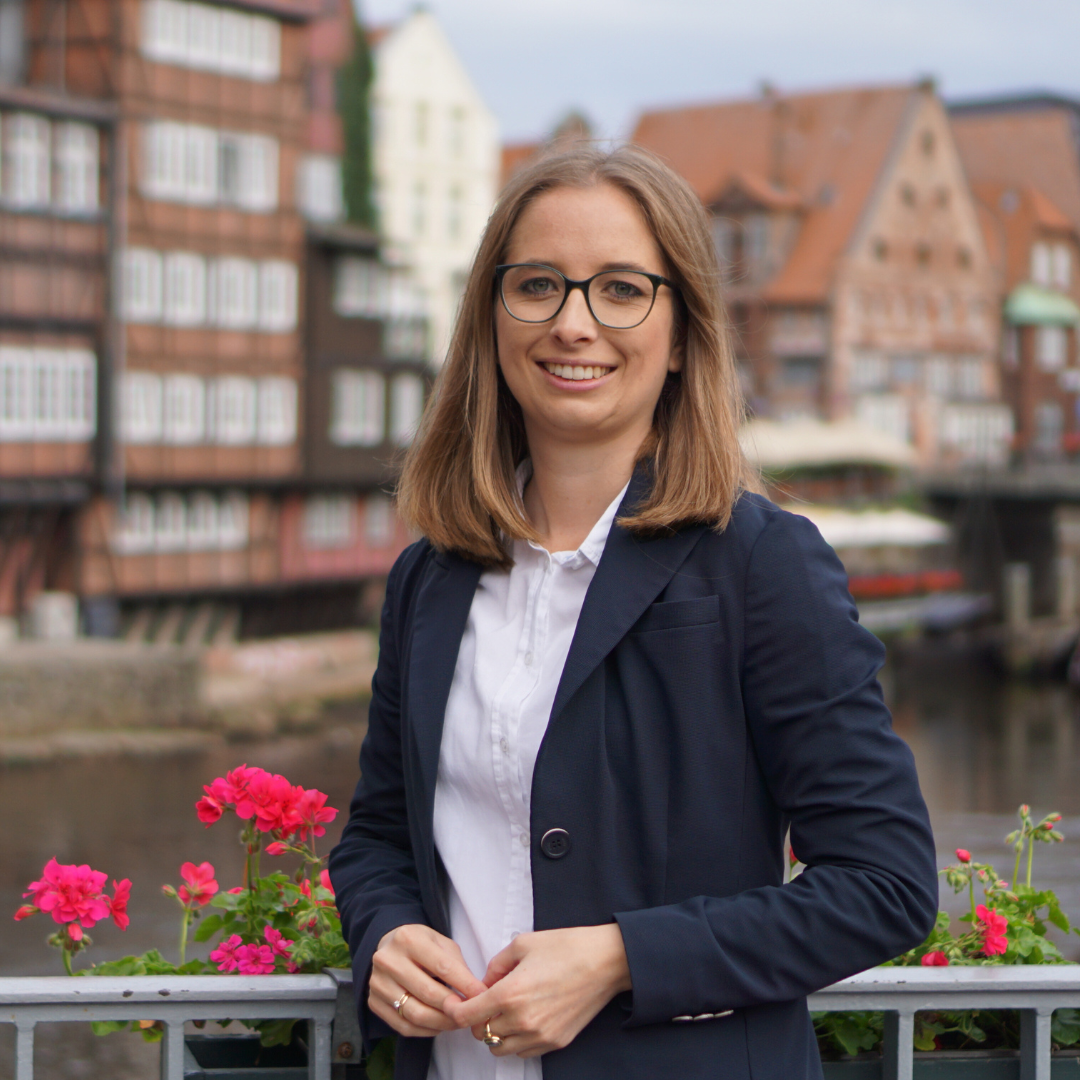
- Bauseneick in 2023

Member of the Landtag of Lower Saxony
- Incumbent
- Assumed office 8 November 2022

Personal details
- Born: 11 January 1991 (age 35)
- Party: Christian Democratic Union (since 2017)

Anna Bauseneick (born 11 January 1991) is a German politician serving as a member of the Landtag of Lower Saxony since 2022. She has served as secretary of the Landtag since 2022.

Anna Bauseneick has been a member of the 19th Lower Saxony State Parliament since 2022. She belongs to the opposition CDU party and is a member of the Committee on Cultural Affairs and Chair of the Committee on Federal and European Affairs and Regional Development. Until September 2023, she was a member of the Presidium as Secretary.
