= Patrick Schreiber =

German politician

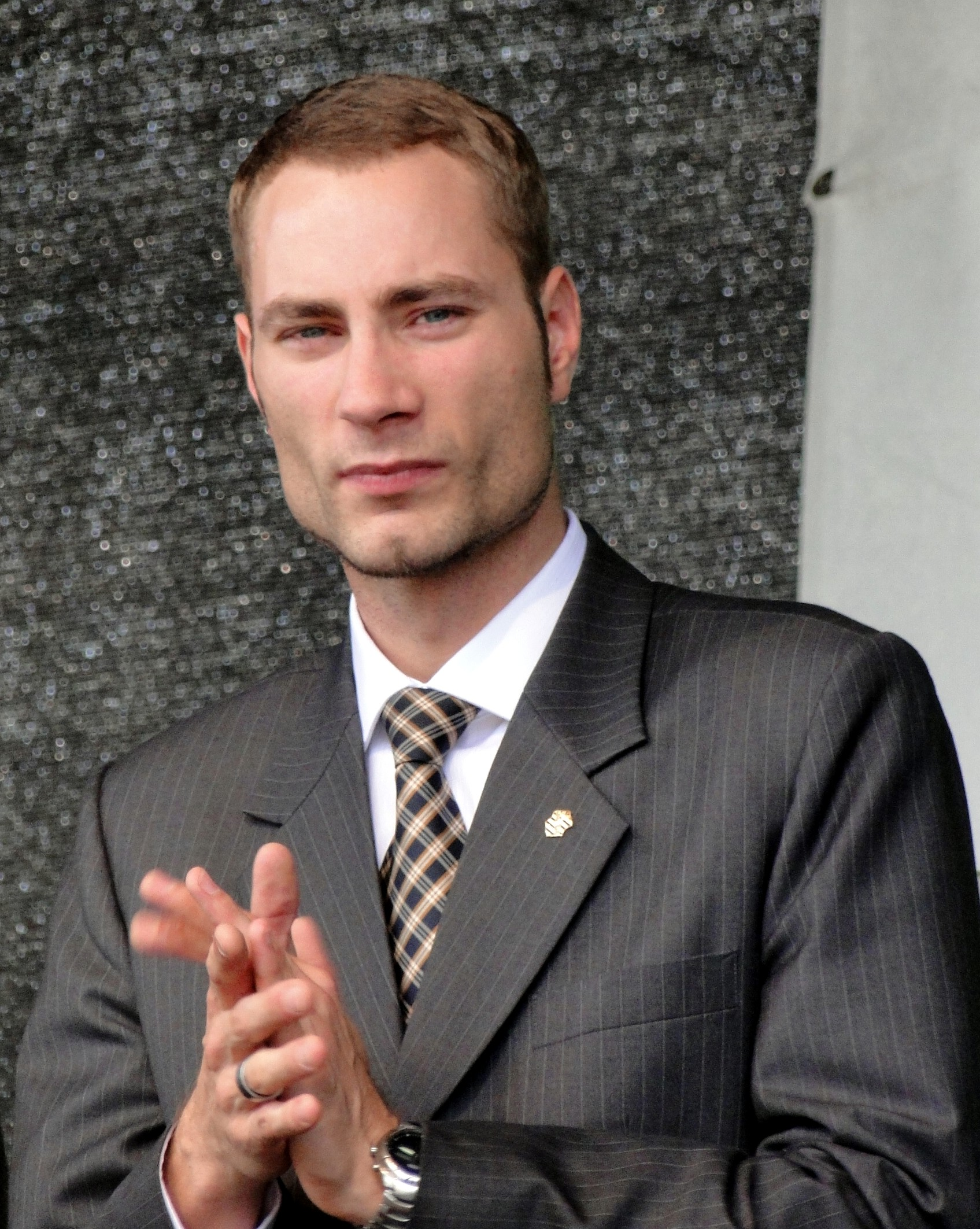
- Schreiber is a member of Germany's Christian Democratic Union
- Born: 8 November 1979 (age 46); Dresden, Germany
- Occupation: Politician

Patrick Schreiber (born 8 November 1979 in Dresden) is a German politician (CDU). He is a councillor in Dresden and was elected to the Saxonian state parliament following the 2009 election.

== Life ==
Schreiber graduated from Romain-Rolland-Gymnasium in 1998 and was subsequently conscripted into the German armed forces, serving in Bayreuth, Holzdorf and Dresden until 1999. He took a major in history at the TU Dresden, while also reading romance studies, Spanish cultural studies and politics. He finished his university education with a Magister Artium in 2007 and has worked as founder and managing director of an event and marketing company (LLC) in Dresden since 2008. Schreiber is gay.

== Political career ==
At the age of 17, Schreiber joined the Junge Union and became a member of the CDU a year later. From 1998 to 2000 he served as chairman of the Saxonian association of the Schüler Union. From 1999 to 2009 Schreiber was a member on the regional board of the Junge Union Saxony and Lower Silesia. For four of those years he held the position of deputy chairman.

Patrick Schreiber has served as chairman of the CDU branch of Dresden-Neustadt since 2003. Between 2001 and 2004, he was a member of the Dresden-Neustadt neighborhood council. He successfully contested the 2004 city council election and managed to defend his seat in 2009.

In the 2009 election of the Saxonian state parliament on August 30, Schreiber carried his Dresden constituency with a significant margin, following a ferocious election campaign featuring many personal attacks against him.

Following the election, Schreiber was named spokesman for youth affairs by his parliamentary group. He is also a member of the committee for social affairs and consumer protection, as well as the committee for schools and sports.
