= Lena Arnoldt =

German politician

Member of the Hessian State Parliament
- In office January 18, 2014 – Present
- Preceded by: Mark Weinmeister
- Constituency: Rotenburg

Personal details
- Born: September 16, 1982 (age 43) Eschwege
- Party: CDU
- Occupation: Politician

Lena Arnoldt (born September 16, 1982 in Eschwege) is a German politician (CDU) and has been a member of the Hessian State Parliament since the 20th legislative period.

== Early life ==
Lena Arnoldt graduated from the Vocational High School in Eschwege in 2002. She completed her training as a tax clerk at the Warken & Partner law firm in 2005. In 2009, she earned her Bachelor of Science in Economics from the Georg-August University in Göttingen, majoring in Business Administration.

From May 2009 to September 2010, Arnoldt worked as an audit assistant at the auditing firm Treugeno GmbH in Kassel. Later, she moved to Strecker, Berger & Partner GmbH, also located in the same city, where she worked until January 2014.

Lena Arnoldt is mother of one child.

== Career ==
Since 2006, Arnoldt has been a member of the district council of the Werra-Meißner district. She was the lead candidate for the CDU (Christian Democratic Union) Werra-Meißner in the local elections on March 6, 2016. From 2016 to 2020, she served as the district chairwoman of the CDU Werra-Meißner. Arnoldt held leading positions in the Young Union, including being the deputy state chairwoman of the Young Union Hesse and a member of the district board of the Young Union North Hesse. In the election year of 2013, she also led the election campaign commission of the Young Union Hesse and was a member of the program commission of the CDU Hesse.

On January 18, 2014, Arnoldt became a member of the Hessian State Parliament as a replacement for Mark Weinmeister. In the 2018 state election, she ran as the direct candidate for the CDU in the Rotenburg constituency and was elected as a member of the Hessian State Parliament. In the 20th legislative period, Arnoldt is a member of the Budget Committee, the Committee for Environment, Climate Protection, Agriculture, and Consumer Protection, as well as the Subcommittee for Financial Control and Administrative Management. Within the CDU parliamentary group in the state parliament, she is the deputy chairwoman, spokeswoman for the Committee for Environment, Climate Protection, Agriculture, and Consumer Protection, and the specialist spokeswoman for her faction on topics such as genetic engineering, agricultural policy, and animal welfare.

In the 2023 state election, Arnoldt defended her direct mandate in the Rotenburg constituency. She received 15,981 votes (37.6 percent).
