= Bernhard Schätzle =

German politician

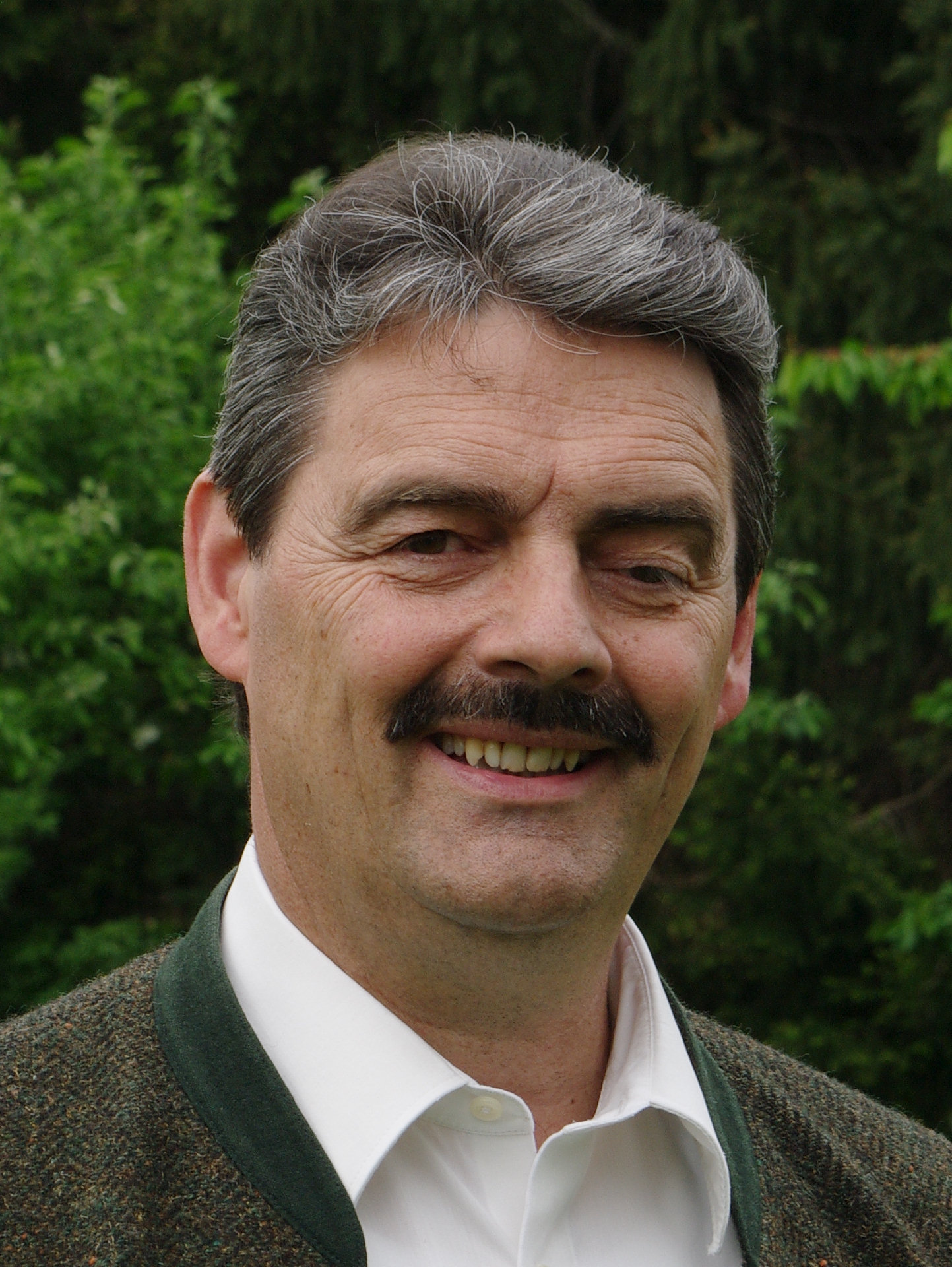
Bernhard Schätzle

Bernhard Schätzle (born 24 July 1954 in Freiburg im Breisgau) is a German politician, representative of the German Christian Democratic Union and member of the Baden-Württemberg state parliament since 2006.

Schätzle founded his vineyard in 1977 out of a small farm. This farm has belonged to his family for more than seven generations. He is married and has four children.

== See also ==
- List of German Christian Democratic Union politicians
