= Tobias C. Bringmann =

German historian and association official

Tobias C. Bringmann (born 18 October 1970) is a German historian and association official.

== Life ==
Born in Lindau, he initially worked as a newsreader, editor and foreign correspondent for Radio Lindau, Radio Belcanto in Munich and Klassik Radio. He studied history, art history and law at Marburg and Freiburg im Breisgau. His 1996 dissertation (supervised by Hans Fenske) was on the question of duels in internal conflict in the German Empire from 1871 to 1918, involving research in the Prussian Privy State Archives among previously unpublished letters, diaries and minutes of the Reichstag. They led him to the conclusion that debates on the legality of duels gave a window on the social perceptions of the Reichstag during the First World War. He also researched the Kotze Affair in the same archive, leading him to conclude that the letters which had drawn Leberecht von Kotze into scandal were by Princess Charlotte of Prussia.

From 1999 to 2009 he was press spokesman for the CDU Baden-Württemberg and since 1 February 2009 he has been managing director of the Verband kommunaler Unternehmen (VKU) for the Landesgruppe Baden-Württemberg. In 2018–2019 he volunteered in the inner circle of the Union der Mitte, which set up a "digital impulse network of liberal Christian Democrats" against right-wing activities within the CDU. He then withdrew from the CDU when Friedrich Merz was elected its party leader.

== Works ==
- (in German) Das Duell Vering-Salomon. In: Einst und Jetzt. Jahrbuch des Vereins für corpsstudentische Geschichtsforschung, Bd. 40 (1995), S. 83–126.
- (in German) Reichstag und Zweikampf. Die Duellfrage als innenpolitischer Konflikt des deutschen Kaiserreichs 1871–1918. HochschulVerlag, Freiburg im Breisgau 1997.
- (in German) Handbuch der Diplomatie 1815–1963. Auswärtige Missionschefs in Deutschland und deutsche Missionschefs im Ausland von Metternich bis Adenauer. Saur, München 2001, ISBN 978-3-598-11431-1.
