= Patrick Pender =

German politician (born 1996)

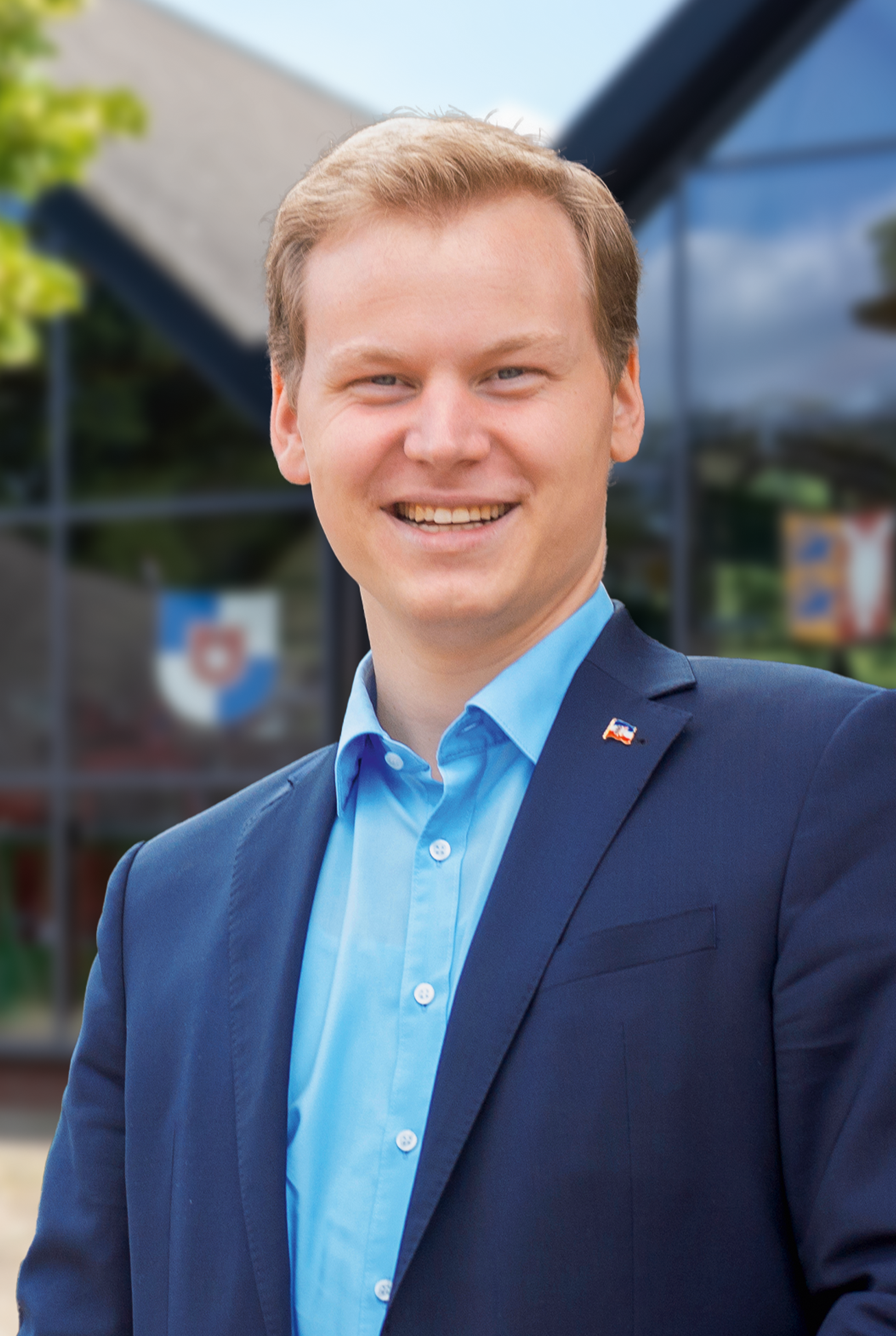
- Pender in 2022

Member of the Landtag of Schleswig-Holstein
- Incumbent
- Assumed office 7 June 2022
- Preceded by: Katja Rathje-Hoffmann
- Constituency: Norderstedt

Personal details
- Born: 7 July 1996 (age 29)
- Party: Christian Democratic Union (since 2016)

Patrick Pender (born 7 July 1996) is a German politician serving as a member of the Landtag of Schleswig-Holstein since 2022. From 2018 to 2021, he served as chairman of the Young Union in Norderstedt.
