= Christopher Salm =

German politician (born 1994)

Member of the Landtag of Saarland
- Incumbent
- Assumed office 1 October 2024

Personal details
- Born: 2 January 1994 (age 32)
- Party: Christian Democratic Union

Christopher Salm (born 2 January 1994) is a German politician serving as a member of the Landtag of Saarland since 2024. He has served as chairman of the Christian Democratic Union in Sotzweiler since 2022.
