= Heinz Dieter Eßmann =

German politician

Member of the Bundestag
- In office 1994–1998

Personal details
- Born: 17 November 1938 (age 87) Wolfenbüttel, West Germany
- Party: CDU

Heinz Dieter Eßmann is a German politician of the Christian Democratic Union (CDU) and former member of the German Bundestag.

== Life ==
In 1966 Eßmann joined the CDU. He was also chairman of the city association of the CDU in Wolfenbüttel. There he was a member of the city council from 1972 and mayor from 1974 to 1996. He was also a member of the district council from 1968 to 1996. From 1994 to 1998, Eßmann sat in the German Bundestag. He was elected via the Lower Saxony state list.

Daughter: in Sweden Annicki (Kicki) Eßmann

Grandchildren: in Sweden Nicki Eßmann Daniela Minou Nordmark Nathalie Nordmark Melissa Nordmark
