= Maximilian Schimmel =

German politician (born 1989)

Member of the Landtag of Hesse
- In office 18 January 2024 – 31 December 2025
- Preceded by: Heike Hofmann
- Succeeded by: Ina Dürr
- Constituency: Darmstadt-Dieburg I

Personal details
- Born: 20 February 1989 (age 37)
- Party: Christian Democratic Union (since 2008)

Maximilian Schimmel (born 20 February 1989) is a German politician serving as mayor of Pfungstadt since 2026. From 2024 to 2025, he was a member of the Landtag of Hesse.
