= Rick Ulbricht =

German politician (born 1991)

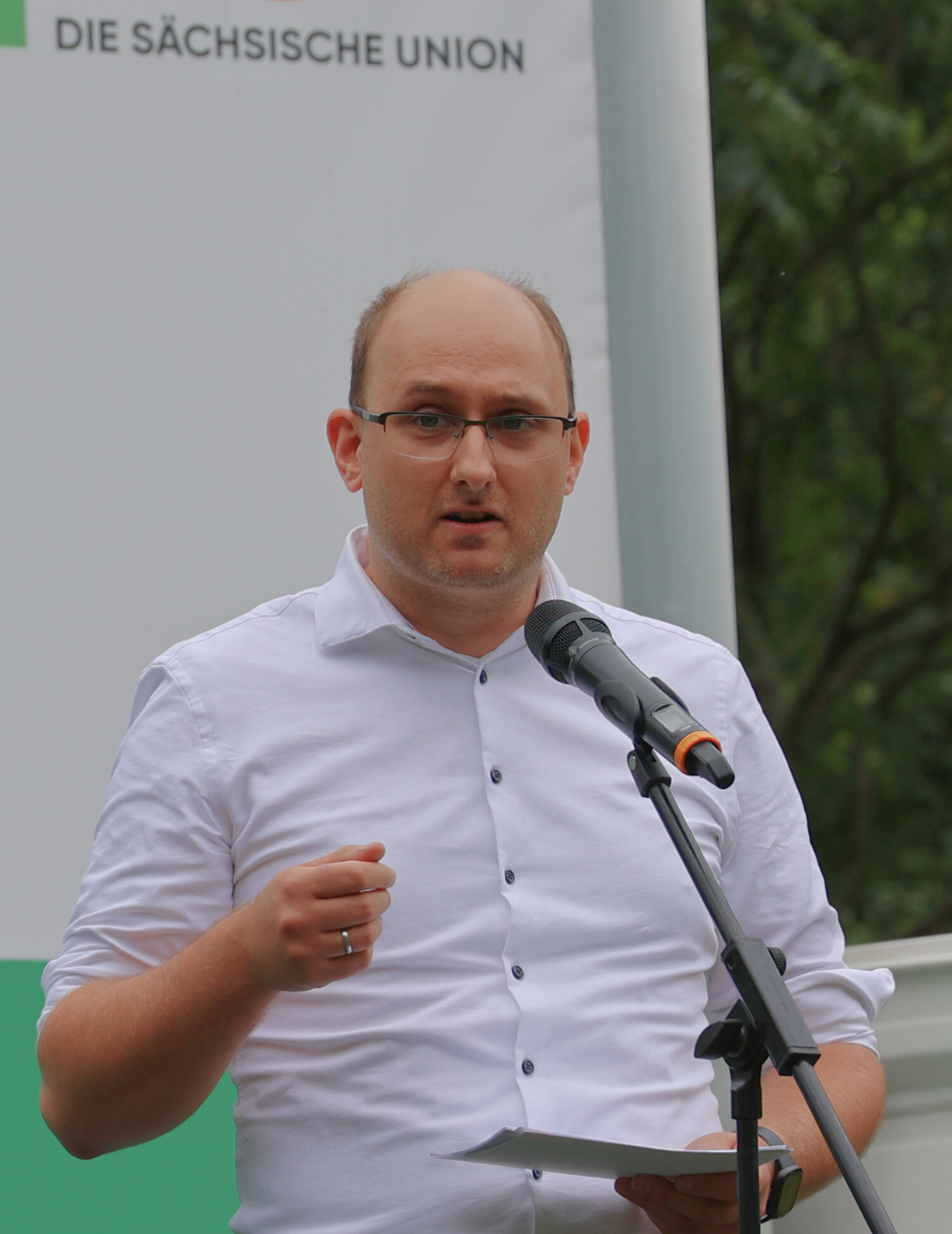
- Ulbricht in 2024

Member of the Landtag of Saxony
- Incumbent
- Assumed office 1 September 2024
- Preceded by: Holger Gasse
- Constituency: Leipzig 7

Personal details
- Born: 24 November 1991 (age 34)
- Party: Christian Democratic Union (since 2011)

Rick Ulbricht (born 24 November 1991) is a German politician serving as a member of the Landtag of Saxony since 2024. He has been a member of the Christian Democratic Union since 2011.
