= Hans Peter Pawlik =

Austrian painter and author

Hans Peter Pawlik (died 2 January 2012 in Vienna) was an Austrian painter and author.

== Life ==
As an author Pawlik wrote on his own or with Josef Otto Slezak and others multiple books and illustrated books about the history of railway in Austria. He became especially known as a painter for his historic motifs of the Southern Railway.

== Works ==
- Schmalspurig nach Mariazell; Slezak, Vienna 1979.
- Wiener Straßenbahn-Panorama. Bilder aus der Zeit von 1865 bis 1982; Slezak, Vienna 1982.
- Südbahn-Lokomotiven; Slezak, Vienna 1987.
- Architektur an der Semmeringbahn; in cooperation with Mihály Kubinszky and Josef Otto Slezak, 2. edition, Slezak, Vienna 1992. ISBN 3-85416-193-X
- Jenbach-Achensee; Slezak, Vienna 1993.
- Wiener Straßenbahn-Panorama. Bilder aus der Zeit von 1865 bis 1982; Slezak, Vienna 1995. ISBN 3-85416-105-0
- Wagners Werk für Wien; Slezak, Vienna 1999.
- Ring-Rund; Slezak, Vienna 1999.
- Mariazellerbahn in der Landschaft; Slezak, Vienna 2001, 2., revised edition ISBN 3-85416-188-3
- Technik der Mariazellerbahn; Slezak, Vienna 2001. ISBN 3-85416-189-1
- Unvergessene Kahlenbergbahn; Slezak, Vienna 2001. ISBN 3-85416-191-3
- Gölsdorfs Glanzstück, die 310er; Slezak, Vienna 2002.
