= Alois Schätzle =

German politician (1925–2022)

Member of the Landtag of Baden-Württemberg
- In office 1971–1988

Personal details
- Born: 30 August 1925 Kollnau, Waldkirch, Baden, Germany
- Died: 9 July 2022 (aged 96) Kollnau, Waldkirch, Baden-Württemberg, Germany
- Party: CDU
- Occupation: Wholesaler, politician

Alois Schätzle (30 August 1925 – 9 July 2022) was a German politician. A member of the Christian Democratic Union of Germany, he served in the Landtag of Baden-Württemberg from 1971 to 1988.

Schätzle died in Waldkirch on 9 July 2022 at the age of 96.
