= Tim Teßmann =

German politician (born 1989)

Member of the Landtag of Saxony-Anhalt
- Incumbent
- Assumed office 6 June 2021
- Preceded by: Ralf Geisthardt
- Constituency: Haldensleben

Personal details
- Born: 16 June 1989 (age 37) Haldensleben
- Party: Christian Democratic Union (since 2016)

Tim Teßmann (born 16 June 1989 in Haldensleben) is a German politician serving as a member of the Landtag of Saxony-Anhalt since 2021. He has served as chairman of the Christian Democratic Union in Börde since 2023.
