= Lothar Gaa =

German politician (1931–2022)

Member of the Landtag of Baden-Württemberg
- In office 1968–1984

Personal details
- Born: 30 March 1931 Plankstadt, Baden, Germany
- Died: 16 May 2022 (aged 91)
- Party: CDU
- Education: Heidelberg University; University of Freiburg

Lothar Gaa (30 March 1931 – 16 May 2022) was a German politician. A member of the Christian Democratic Union of Germany, he served in the Landtag of Baden-Württemberg from 1968 to 1984. He died on 16 May 2022 at the age of 91.
