= Austrian Mexicans =

Austrian Mexicans austriaco-mexicanos
Total population
- 3,500 Austria-born residents (2021)

Regions with significant populations
- Mexico City · Chihuahua

Languages
- Spanish (Mexican Spanish) · German (Austrian German)

Religion
- Roman Catholic · Protestantism · Judaism

Related ethnic groups
- German Mexicans, Swiss Mexicans

Austrian Mexicans are Mexican citizens of Austrian descent or Austrian-born people who reside in Mexico. Most immigrants arrived in the country when Austria as well as other Central European countries were part of the Austro-Hungarian Empire.

== History ==
19th century Austrians often settled in the northern regions of Mexico, where the German immigrants had already established themselves. Emperor Maximilian (1864–67) invited a small number of Jews from the Austria-Hungarian region and other European countries to settle in Mexico.

In 1938, around 1,500 Austrian immigrants arrived in Mexico. With diverse political origins, these Austrian refugees in Mexico were linked in their fight against fascism, at the time of the presidency of Manuel Ávila Camacho, the Austrian Republican Action Association of Mexico (aram).

== Notable people ==
- Ana Casas Broda, photographer
- Giuliana Olmos, professional tennis player
- Rudolph Pokorny, chess player

== See also ==
- German Mexicans
- Austria–Mexico relations
- Swiss Mexicans
- White Mexicans
