= Jürgen Klemann =

German politician

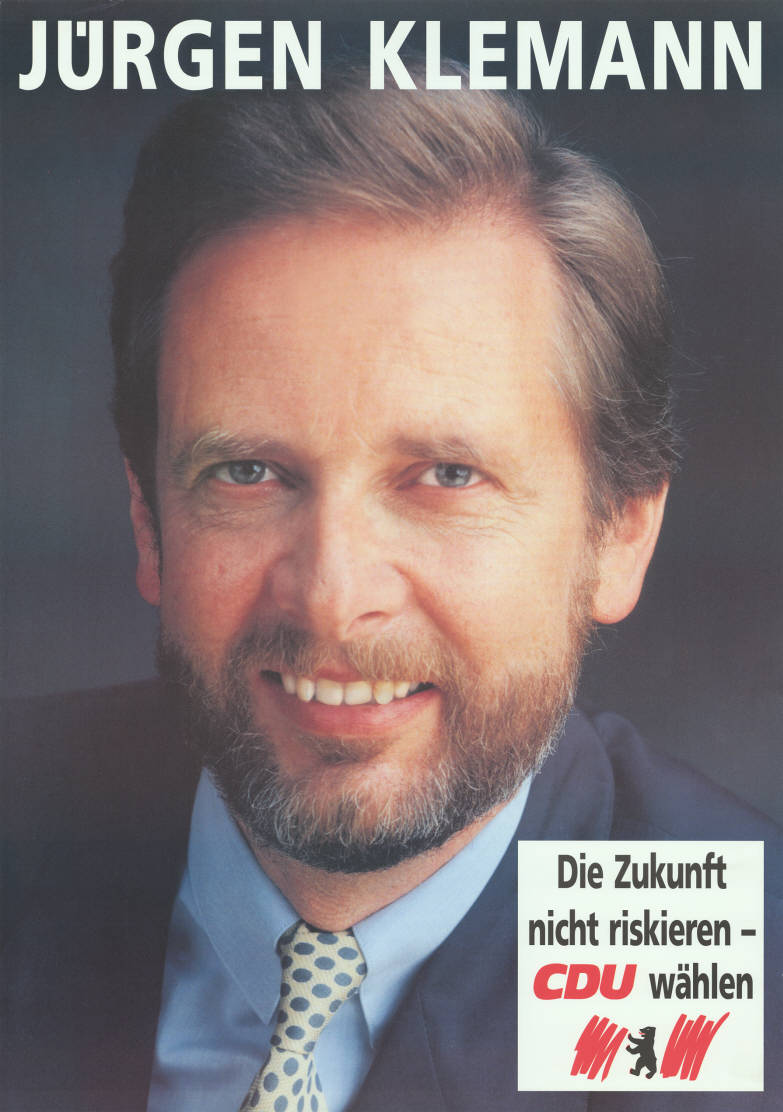
Candidate poster for the House of Representatives elections in Berlin in 1995

Jürgen Klemann (December 16, 1944, in Berlin-Pankow) is a German lawyer and politician (CDU).

== Life and career ==
Jürgen Klemann completed his high school diploma in 1963 and later studied law until 1968 at the Free University of Berlin and the University of Heidelberg. In 1969, he passed his first legal state examination, followed by his second in 1973. From 1973 to 1979, he worked as an administrative lawyer at the Federal Employment Agency. Prior to entering politics, he served as the deputy director of the Employment Office II in West Berlin. He then became the district mayor (Bezirksstadtrat) in Zehlendorf until 1981, overseeing personnel and administration.

During his studies, Klemann joined the Berlin branch of the Christian Democratic Union (CDU). He was elected as the district mayor of Zehlendorf in 1981, a position he held until assuming the role of senator. Under his initiative, the Mexikoplatz was reconstructed during Berlin's 750th anniversary celebration in 1987. He also wrote the preface for the neighborhood editions of the Baedeker city guide for West Berlin districts in the same year. In 1990, he opposed the partial closure of the Havelchaussee, refusing to erect prohibition signs and personally delivering the signs to the Traffic Senator of the Social Democratic Party (SPD), Horst Wagner. This sparked a dispute with the Berlin Senate, which was resolved only after the CDU took over the government in 1991. The closure of the Havelchaussee was lifted, while the 30 km/h speed limit remained.

After Eberhard Diepgen returned to the position of governing mayor in 1991, Klemann was appointed as the Senator for Schools, Vocational Training, and Sports in the Berlin Senate. Despite Diepgen's reelection in 1996, Klemann remained a senator but switched to the portfolio of Transport, Construction, and Housing, eventually leaving the Senate after the 1999 Berlin elections.

== Literature ==
- Werner Breunig, Andreas Herbst (Eds.): Biographical Handbook of Berlin Delegates 1963–1995 and City Councilors 1990/1991 (= Publication Series of the State Archive Berlin. Volume 19). State Archive Berlin, Berlin 2016, ISBN 978-3-9803303-5-0, pp. 209 et seq
