= Swiss Mexicans =

Suizo-mexicanos

Total population
- 6,000

Regions with significant populations
- Mexico City, Morelos, Oaxaca, Chiapas, Puebla, Veracruz, Quintana Roo and Chihuahua

Languages
- Spanish (Mexican Spanish), German, French, Italian

Religion
- Christianity (mostly Protestantism and Roman Catholic)

Related ethnic groups
- Austrian Mexicans · German Mexicans · French Mexicans · Italian Mexicans

Swiss Mexicans are Mexican citizens of full or partial Swiss ancestry. Swiss Mexican communities are found in Mexico City, Morelos, Oaxaca, Chiapas, Puebla, Veracruz, Quintana Roo and Chihuahua. There are about 6,000 Swiss citizens residing in Mexico and many more Mexicans of Swiss ancestry. Many work as teachers, artists, researchers, missionaries or philanthropists.

== History ==
Among the first settlements of Swiss immigrants, stands out a Swiss colony in Apaxco, State of Mexico, that was founded by the Riefhkol family. By 1921, they settled there due to the construction of a cement plant in the area.

== The Swiss Club ==
The oldest Swiss institution in Mexico is the Swiss Club. It was first established in the 1940s on an area of 10,000 square meters in Colonia del Valle, a neighborhood with a comfortable economy located south of the capital, the center began to operate with more than 50% Swiss among its associates.

== Education ==
Colegio Suizo de México, a Swiss international primary and secondary school in Mexico catering to Swiss families has campuses in Cuernavaca, Mexico City, and Querétaro City.

== Demographics ==
1990 - 566 People

2000 - 478 People

2010 - 422 People

2020 - 6,000 People

== See also ==
- Mexico–Switzerland relations
- White Mexicans
- Swiss diaspora
- Austrian Mexicans
- French Mexicans
- German Mexicans
- Italian Mexicans
