= Austria–Mexico relations =

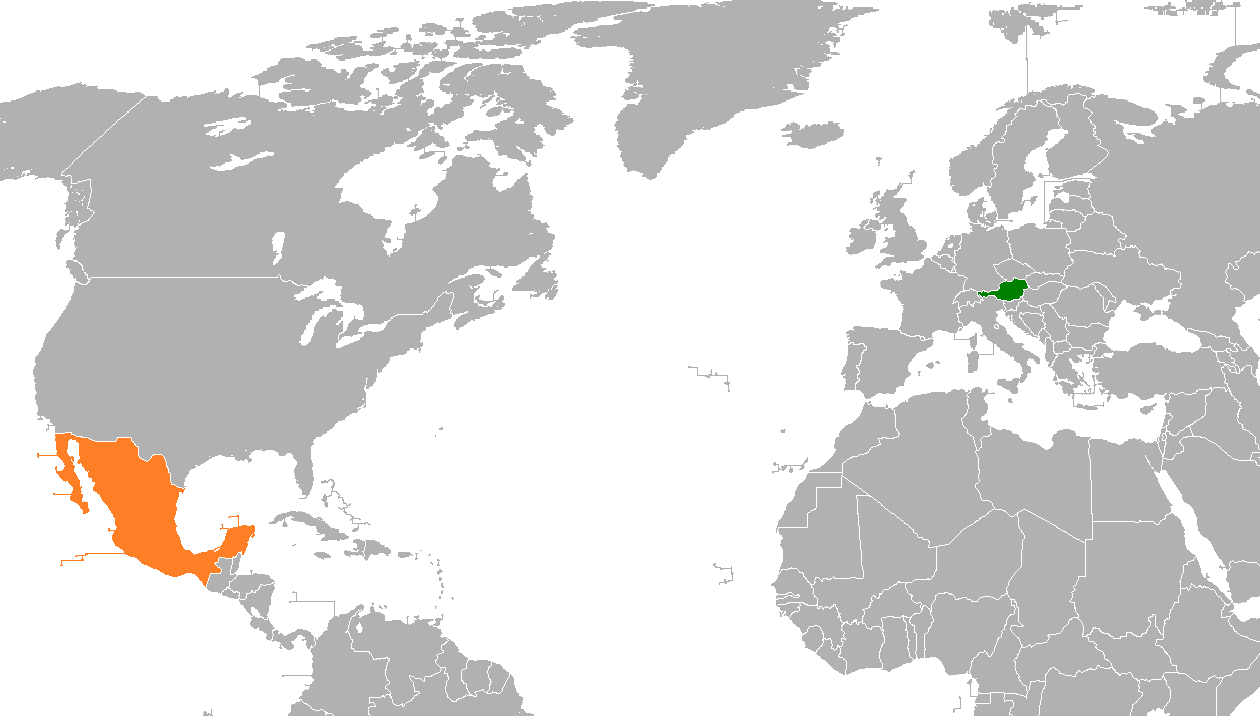

- Austria: Mexico

The nations of Austria and Mexico established diplomatic relations in 1842. Relations were strengthened in 1864 when Archduke Maximilian of Austria became Emperor of Mexico, however, after his execution, diplomatic relations were severed until 1901. Diplomatic relations were once again disrupted in 1938 during the Anschluss and relations were fully restored after World War II.

Both nations are members of the OECD and the United Nations.

== History ==
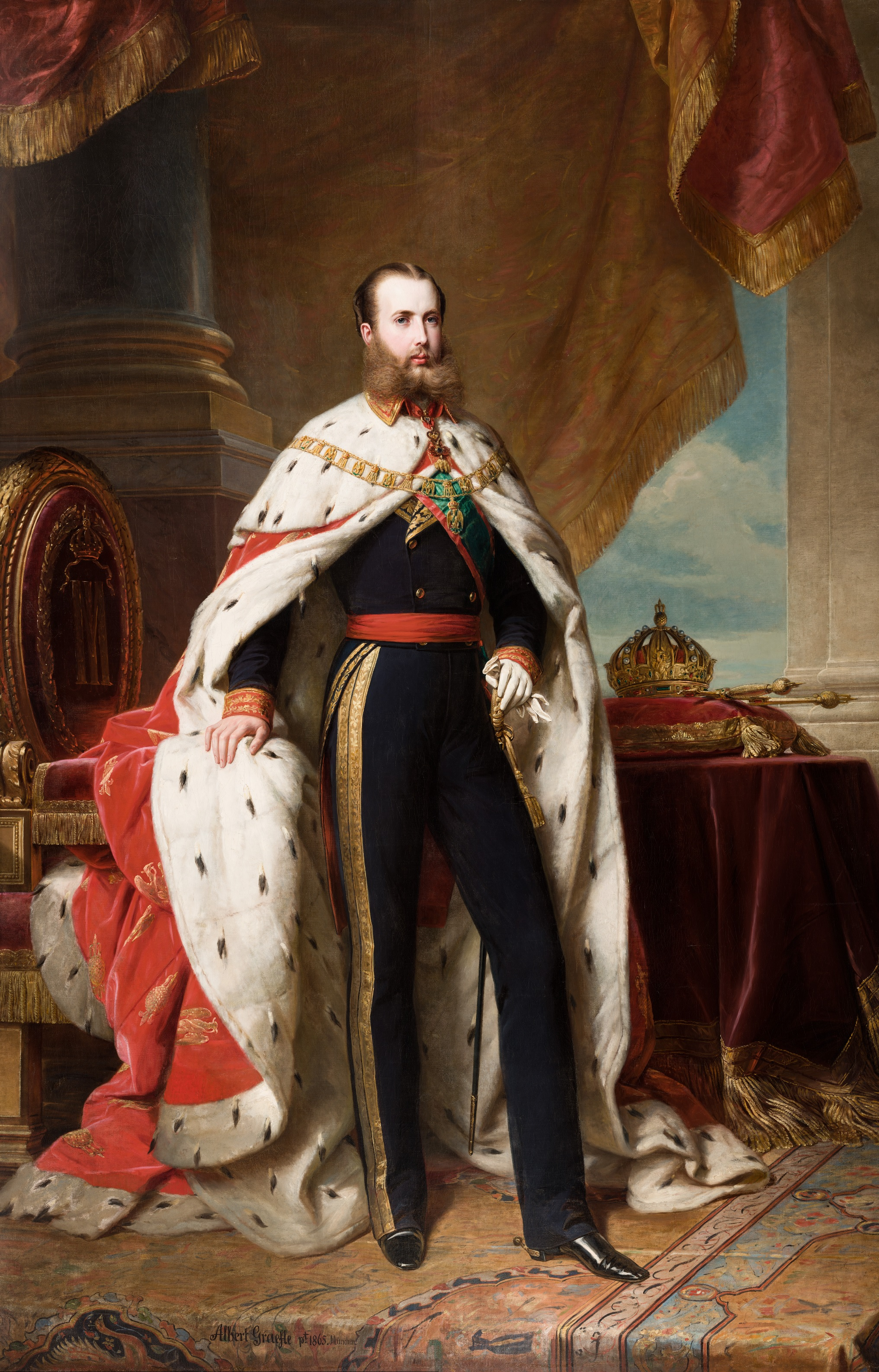
Portrait of Emperor Maximilian I of Mexico

On 30 July 1842, the Austrian Empire and Mexico established diplomatic relations after signing a treaty of Friendship, Navigation and Commerce between the two nations. In December 1861, Emperor Napoleon III of France invaded Mexico. After successfully taking over the country, Emperor Napoleon III, along with the Mexican aristocracy, offered the crown of Mexico to his Austrian cousin, Maximilian of Habsburg. In April 1864, Maximilian, along with his wife Carlota set sail for Mexico and upon arrival to the country in May 1864, Maximilian was declared Emperor of Mexico. This period was known as the Second Mexican Empire.

The reign of Emperor Maximilian was engulfed in constant conflict between his French backed government and the government in exile of Benito Juárez. In 1866, France withdrew its army from Mexico and in June 1867, Emperor Maximilian was captured by Juárez forces in Querétaro City and executed along with two of his generals, thus ending the empire. After the execution of Maximilian, diplomatic relations between Austria and Mexico were severed until 1901.

In 1938, Mexico became the only country to protest against the Anschluss of Austria at the League of Nations. During World War II, Austria was part of the German Reich and in May 1942 Mexico declared war on Germany after the destruction of two Mexican oil tankers in the Gulf of Mexico by German U-boats. During the war, Mexico accepted 1,500 Austrian refugees fleeing Nazi persecution. After the war, normal relations were restored between the two nations.

Over the years, diplomatic relations between the two nations have strengthened. In 1974, Mexican President Luis Echeverría paid a visit to Salzburg as part his European tour and attended the Club of Rome Sumit. In 2005, President Heinz Fischer became the first Austrian head of state to pay a visit to Mexico. In 2006, former President Vicente Fox reciprocated the visit by paying a state visit to Austria. In 2011, the Colegio Austriaco Mexicano opened in Querétaro City.

There has been much discussion between the two nations over whether Austria should return Moctezuma's headdress to Mexico alongside various other pre-Hispanic artifacts that were taken to Austria in 1519 and are currently on display at the Museum of Ethnology in Vienna. In July 2014, it was declared that the headdress was too fragile to travel and therefore cannot be returned to Mexico. In 2018, Austria acknowledged and thanked Mexico on the 80th anniversary of Mexico's protest against the Anschluss.

In 2021, both nations celebrated 120 years of diplomatic relations.

== High-level visits ==
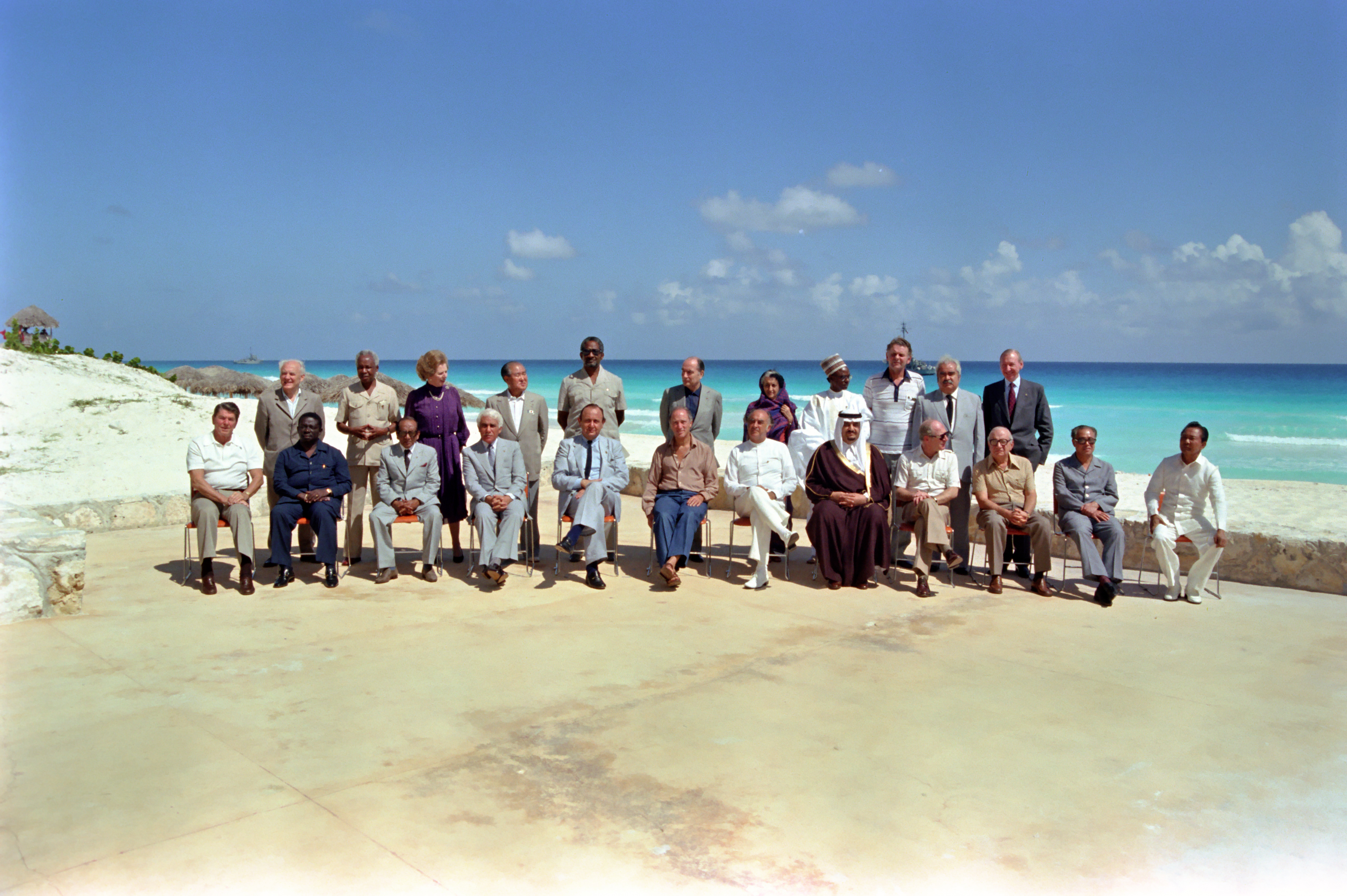
Austrian Foreign Minister Willibald Pahr attending the North–South Summit in Cancún along with Mexican President José López Portillo; 1981.

High-level visits from Austria to Mexico

- Foreign Minister Willibald Pahr (1981)
- Chancellor Wolfgang Schüssel (2004)
- President Heinz Fischer (2005)

High-level visits from Mexico to Austria

- President Luis Echeverría (1974)
- President Vicente Fox (2006)
- Foreign Minister Luis Ernesto Derbez (2006)
- Foreign Minister Patricia Espinosa Cantellano (2007, 2010, 2012)
- Foreign Undersecretary Carlos de Icaza González (2016)

== Bilateral agreements ==
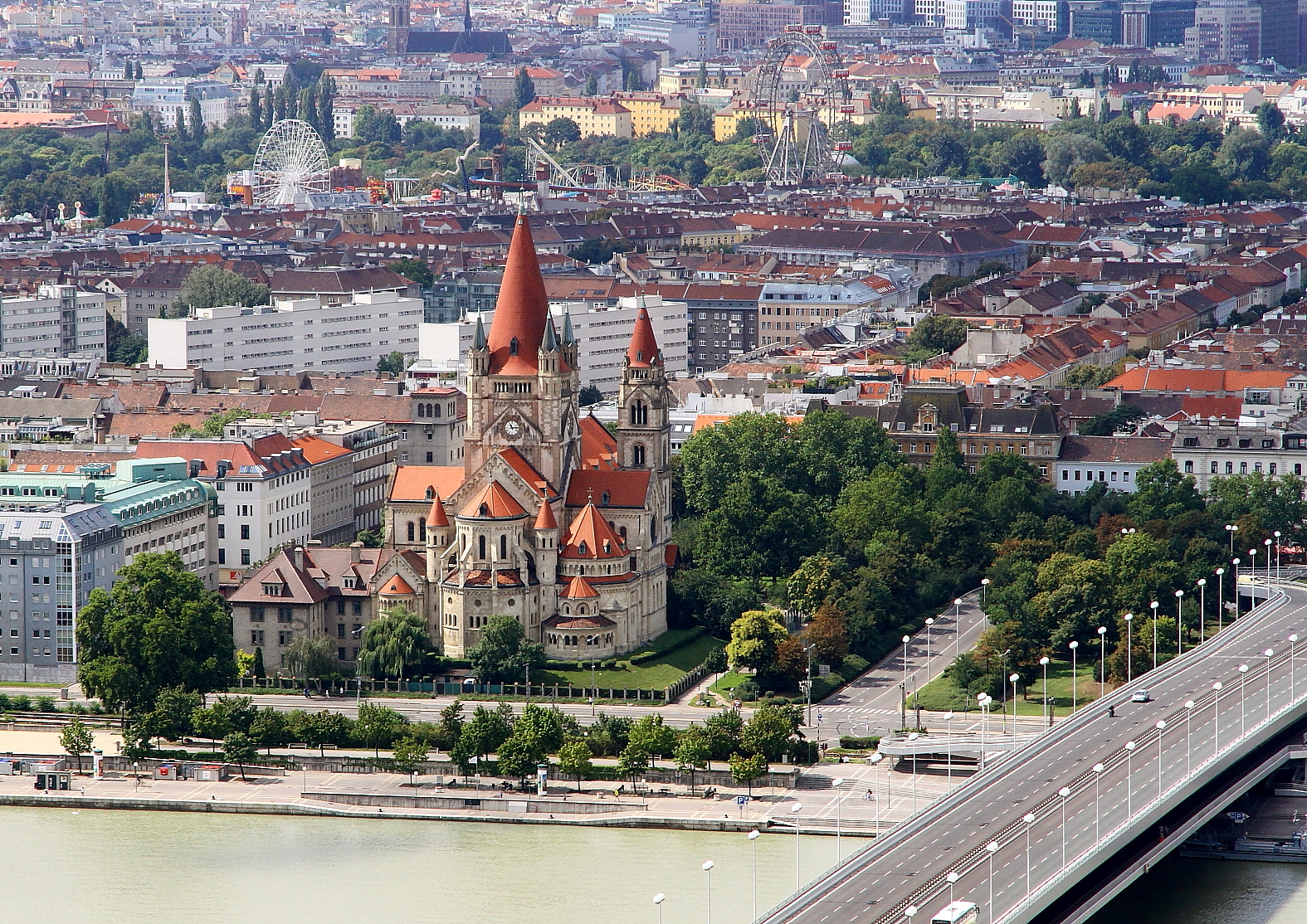
St. Francis of Assisi Church and the Mexikoplatz square was named Mexikoplatz in 1956, to honour the support Mexico gave to Austria in 1938.

Both nations have signed several bilateral agreements such as an Agreement on Cultural Exchanges (1974); Agreement on Air Transportation (1995); Agreement on the Promotion and Protection of Investments (1998) and an Agreement on the Avoidance of Double-Taxation and Tax Evasion (2004).

== Transportation ==
There are direct flights between Vienna International Airport and Cancún International Airport with Austrian Airlines.

== Trade relations ==
In 1997, Mexico and the European Union (which includes Austria) signed a free trade agreement. In 2023, two-way trade between both nations amounted to US$2.3 billion. Austria's main exports to Mexico include: pharmaceutical products, steel, aluminum and paper. Mexico's main exports to Austria include: machinery, electronics, car parts and beer. Mexican multinational companies América Móvil and Nemak (among others) operate in Austria.

== Resident diplomatic missions ==
- Austria has an embassy in Mexico City.
- Mexico has an embassy in Vienna.

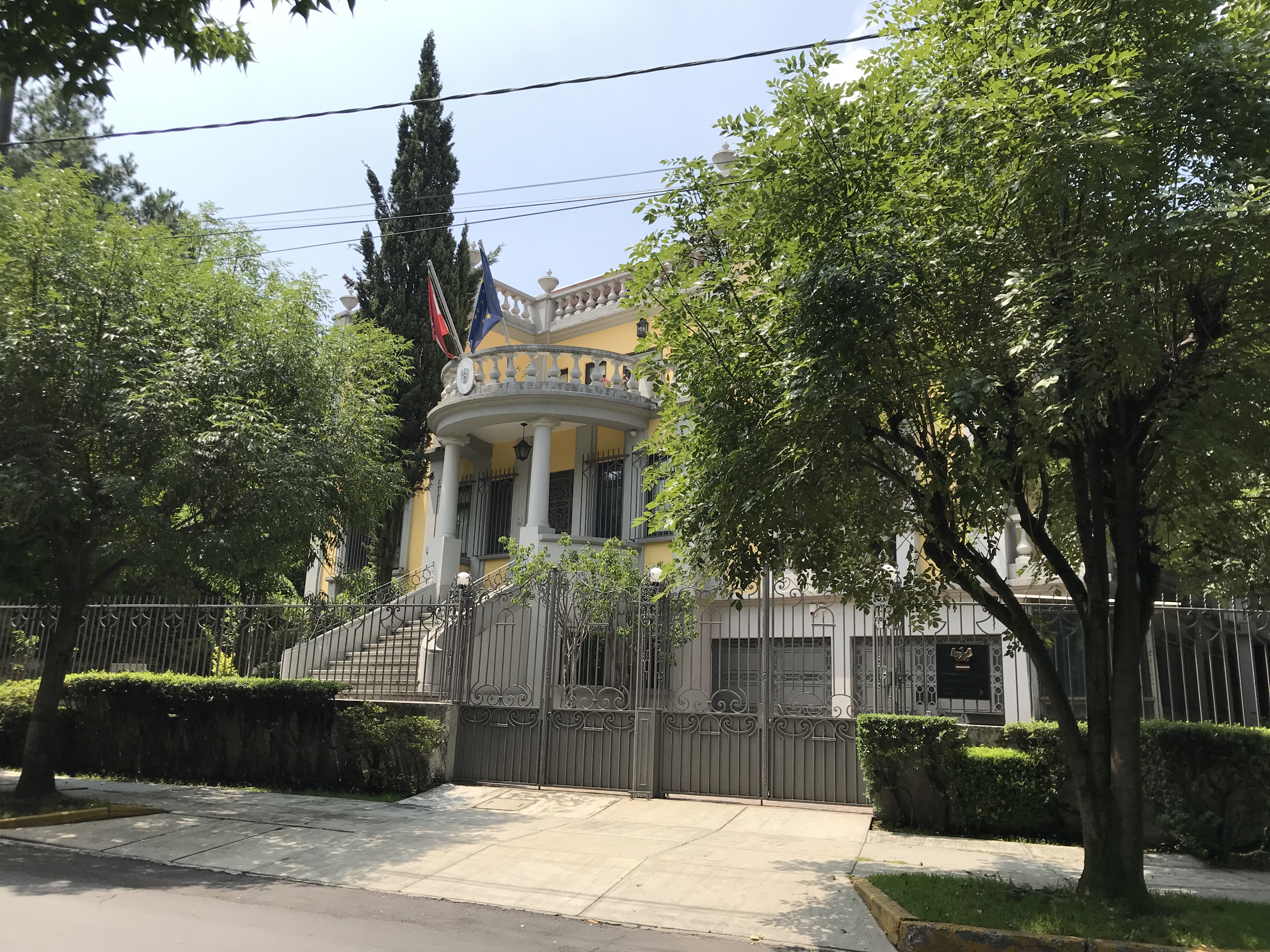
Embassy of Austria in Mexico City

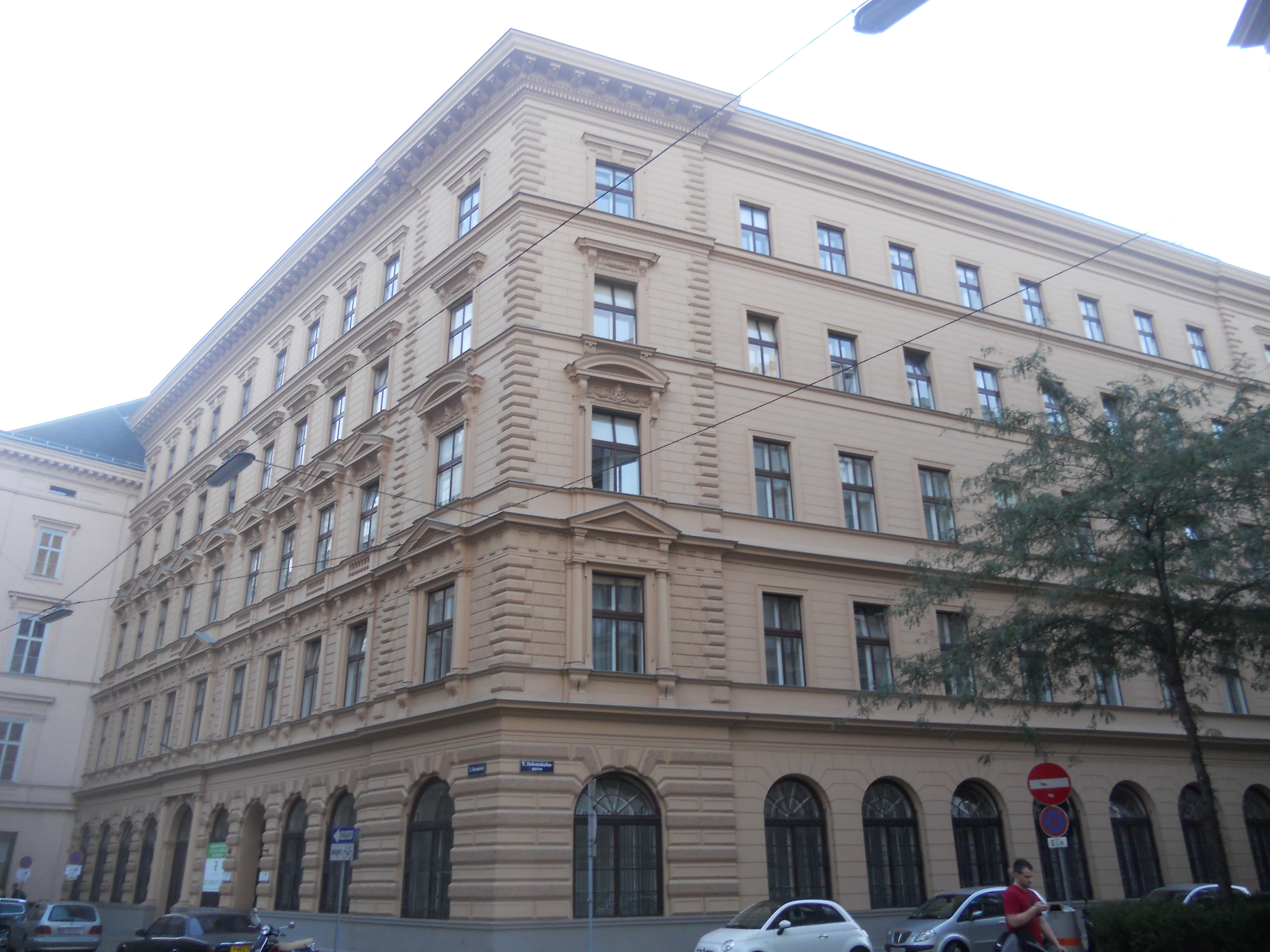
Embassy of Mexico in Vienna

== Gallery ==
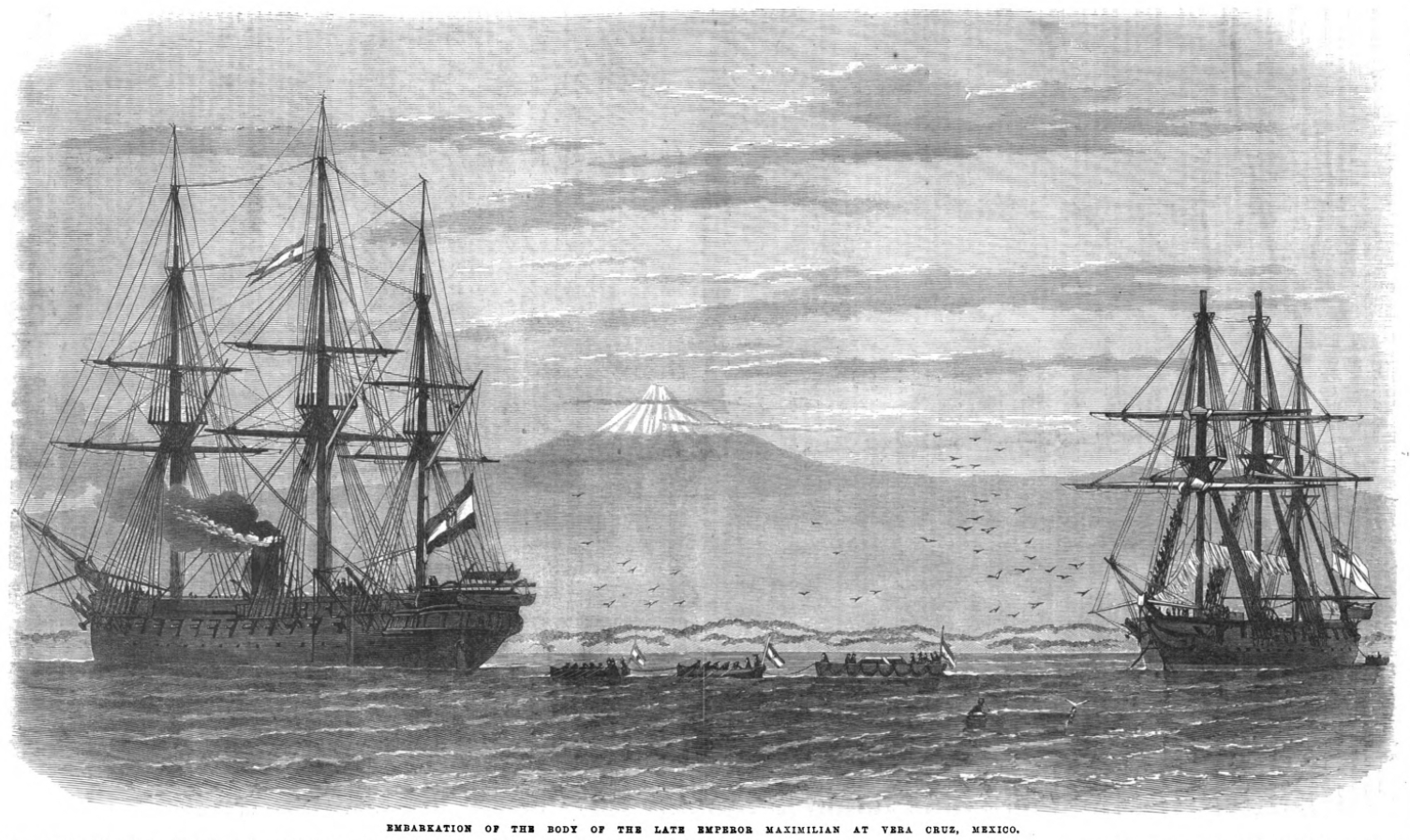
Austrian frigate Novara in Veracruz City receiving the body of Emperor Maximillian to be buried in Austria

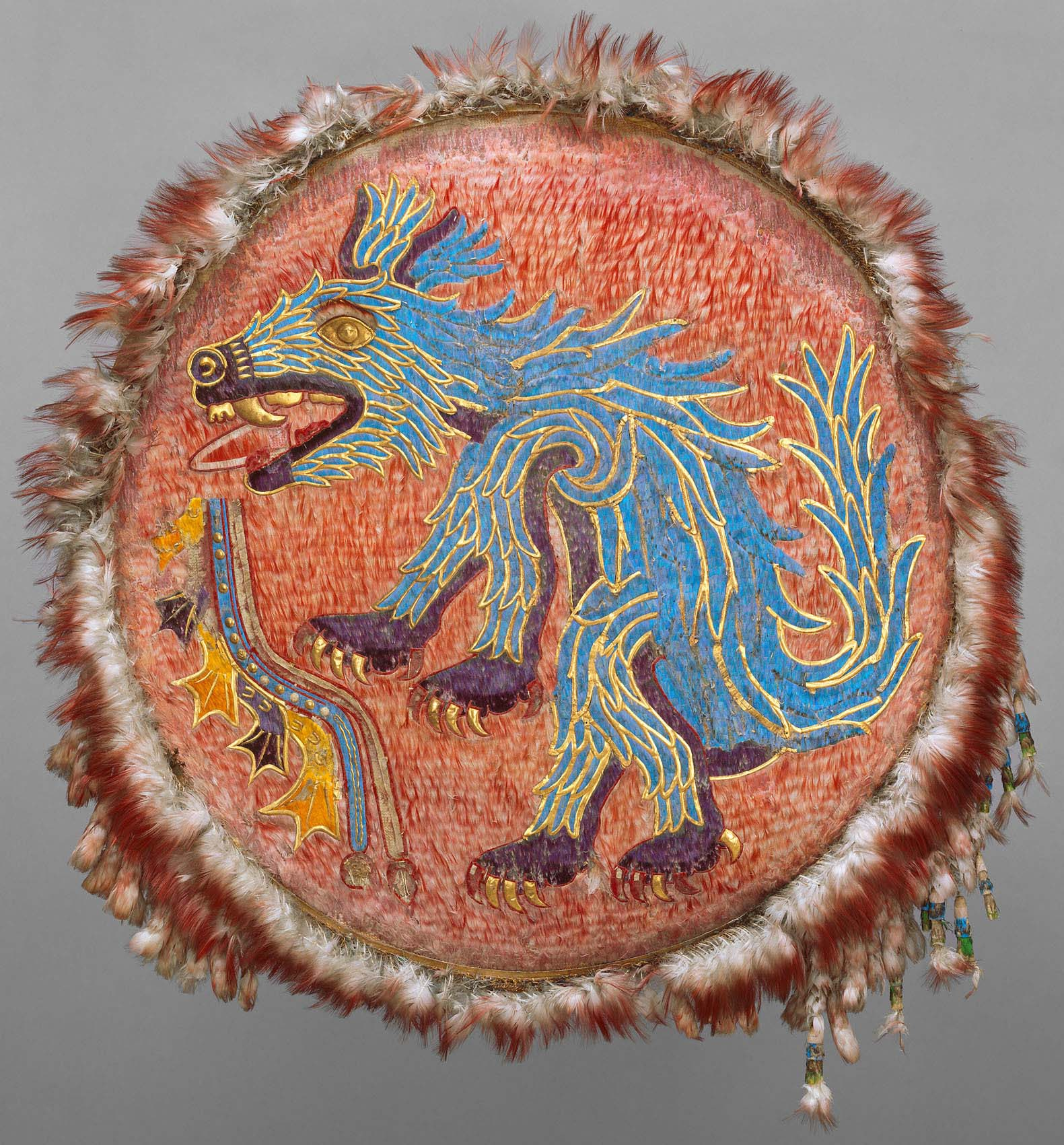
The Chimalli Ahuizotl (Aztec war shield) at the Weltmuseum Wien

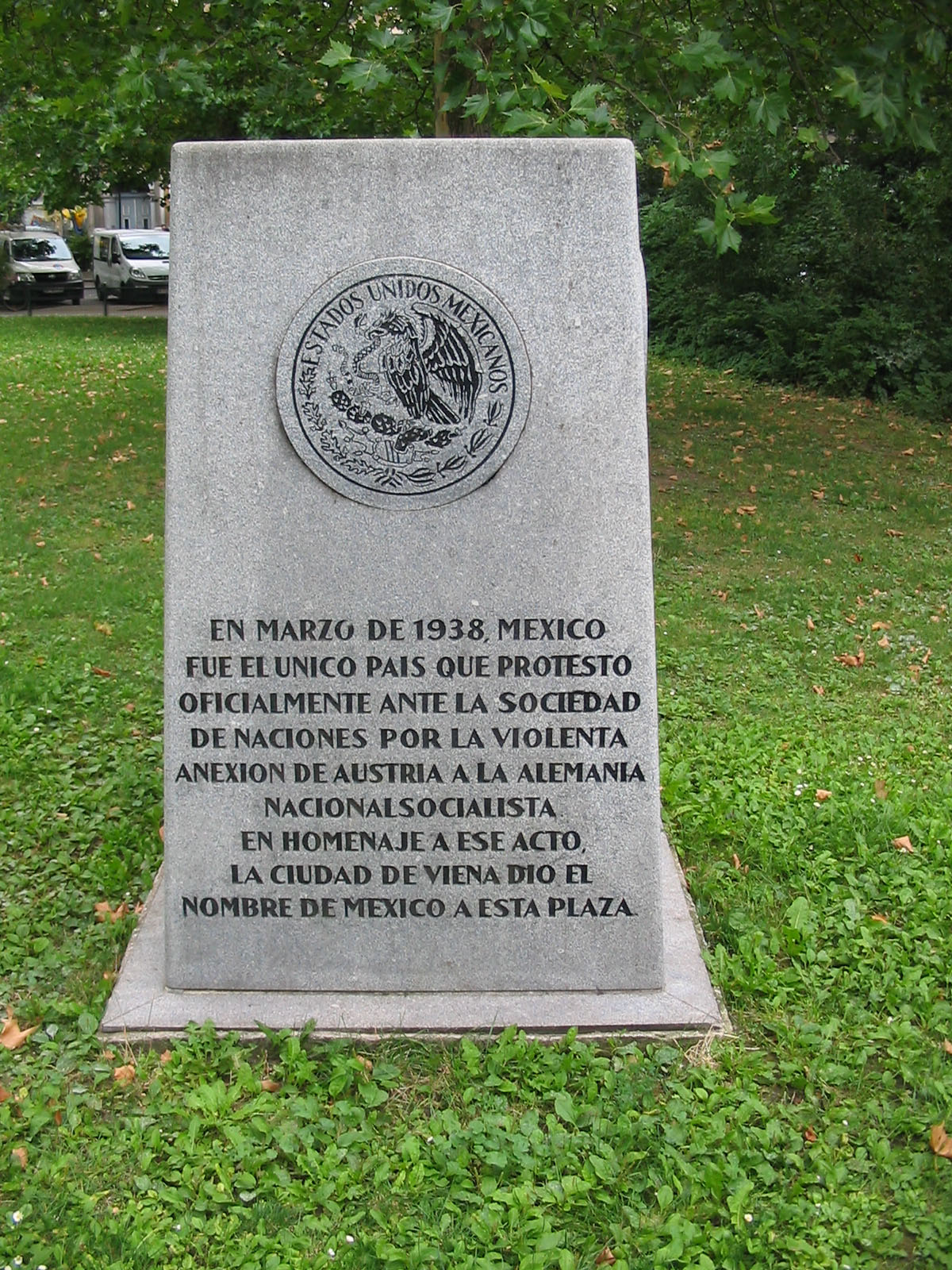
Plaque commemorating Mexico's protest against the Anschluss in Vienna

Foreign Ministers Claudia Ruiz Massieu of Mexico; Sebastian Kurz of Austria and Charles Flanagan of Ireland in New York City; 2015

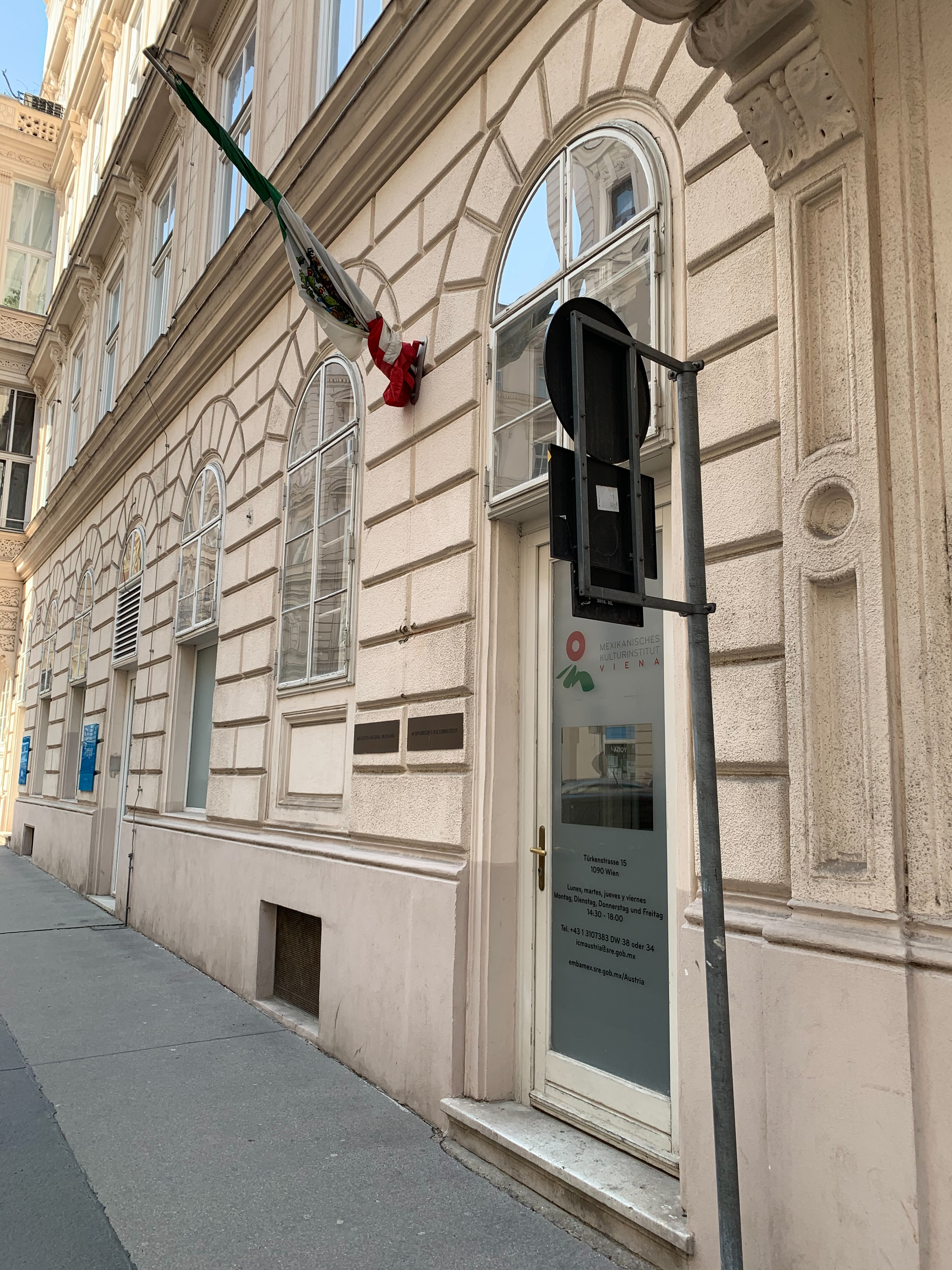
Mexican Cultural Institute in Vienna

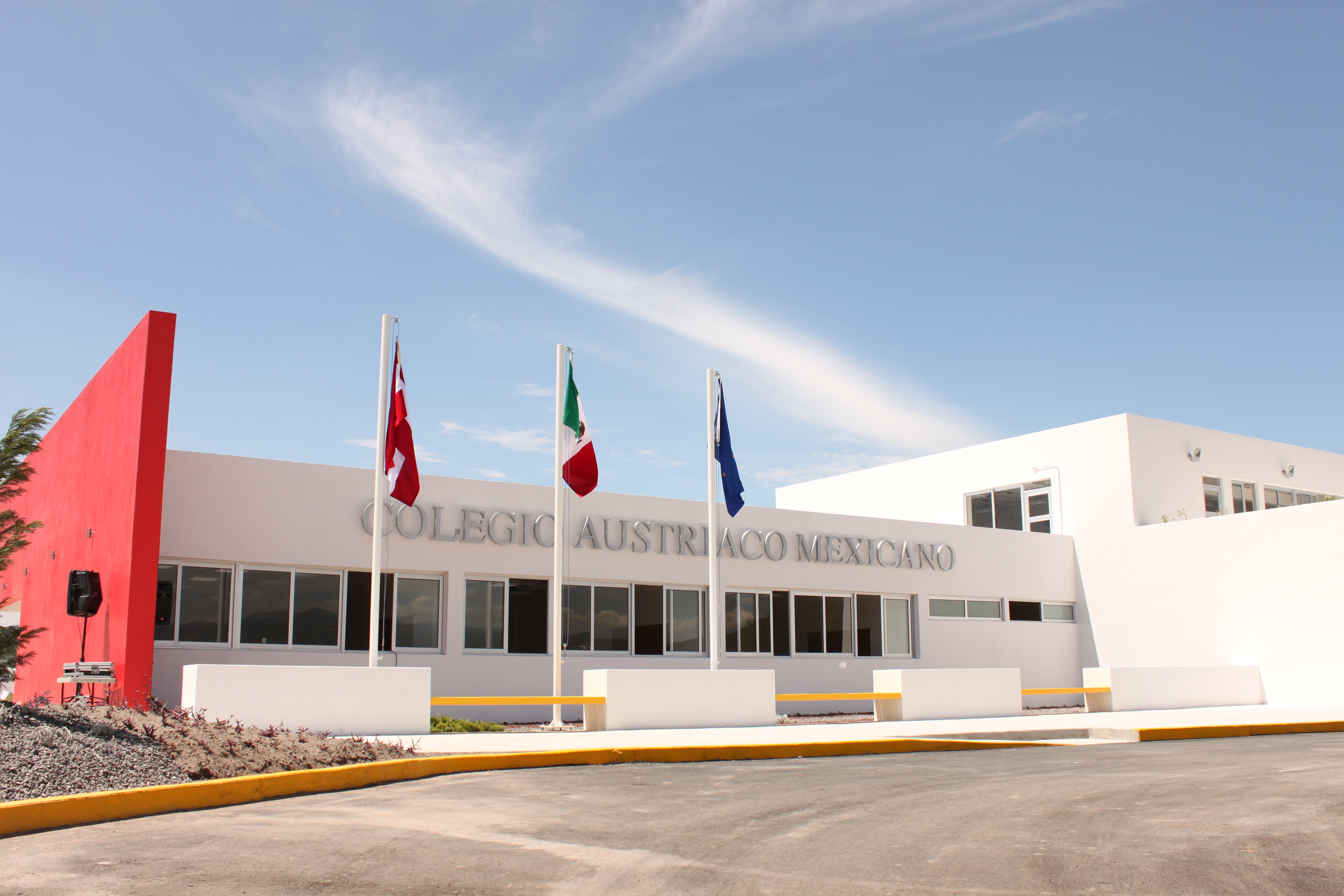
The Austrian School (Colegio Austriaco Mexicano) in Querétaro

== See also ==
- Foreign relations of Austria
- Foreign relations of Mexico
- Austrian Mexicans
- French intervention in Mexico
- Mexikoplatz
