= Mexico–Switzerland relations =

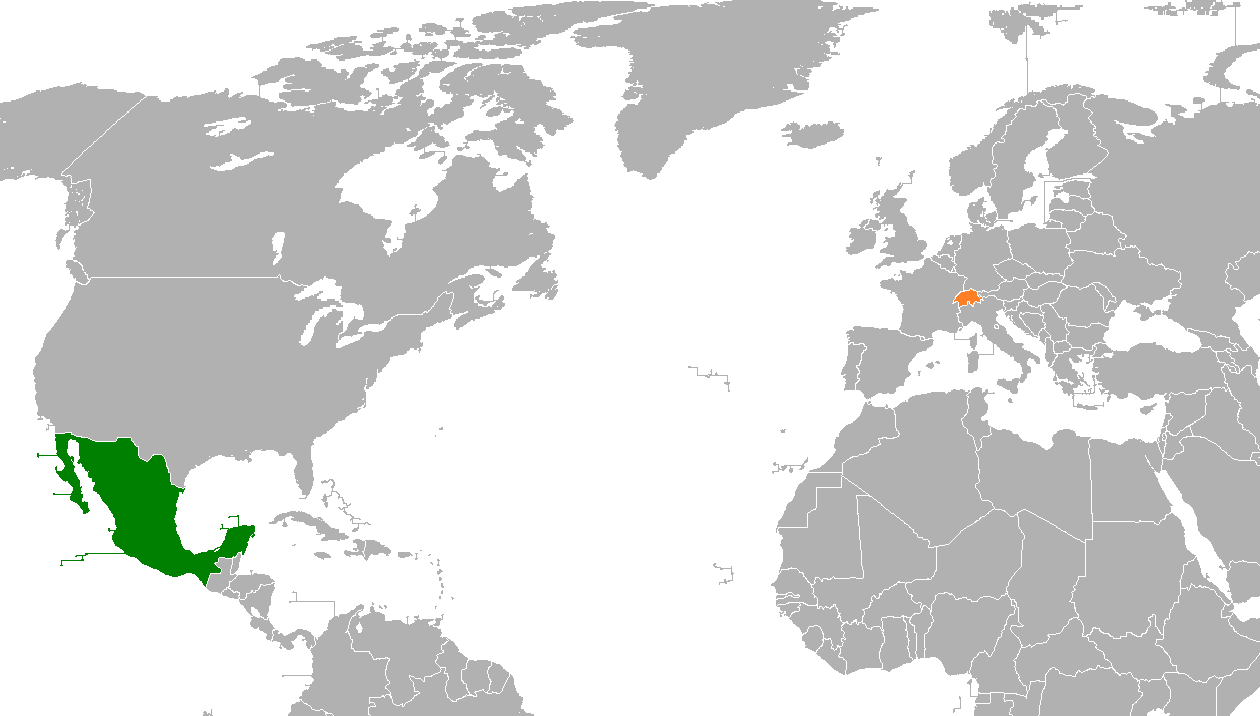

- Mexico: Switzerland

The nations of Mexico and Switzerland established diplomatic relations in 1945, however, both nations had established official contact in 1827. Both nations are members of the Organisation for Economic Co-operation and Development and the United Nations.

== History ==
Official contact between Mexico and Switzerland was established in 1827. That same year, Switzerland opened a diplomatic office in Mexico City. In 1832, both nations signed a treaty of Friendship and Commerce and Mexico opened a diplomatic office in Basel. In 1945, both nations officially established diplomatic relations and in 1946, Mexico opened a diplomatic office in Bern. In 1958, both nations elevated their diplomatic missions to embassies.

In 1990, Mexican President Carlos Salinas de Gortari traveled to Geneva and Davos. In November 2004, Swiss President Joseph Deiss traveled to Mexico, the first visit by a Swiss President. While in Mexico, President Deiss met with President Vicente Fox. There have been several visits by leaders of both nations.

Switzerland maintains a high-level international profile due to it hosting several UN agencies and other international organizations in Geneva. Each year, the World Economic Forum is held in Davos and high-level Mexican officials, including on occasion the Mexican President; travel to Switzerland to meet with Swiss politicians and business persons.

In 2021, both nations celebrated 75 years of diplomatic relations. In July 2026, Swiss President Guy Parmelin paid a visit to Mexico and met with President Claudia Sheinbaum to discuss depending trade relations between both nations.

== High-level visits ==
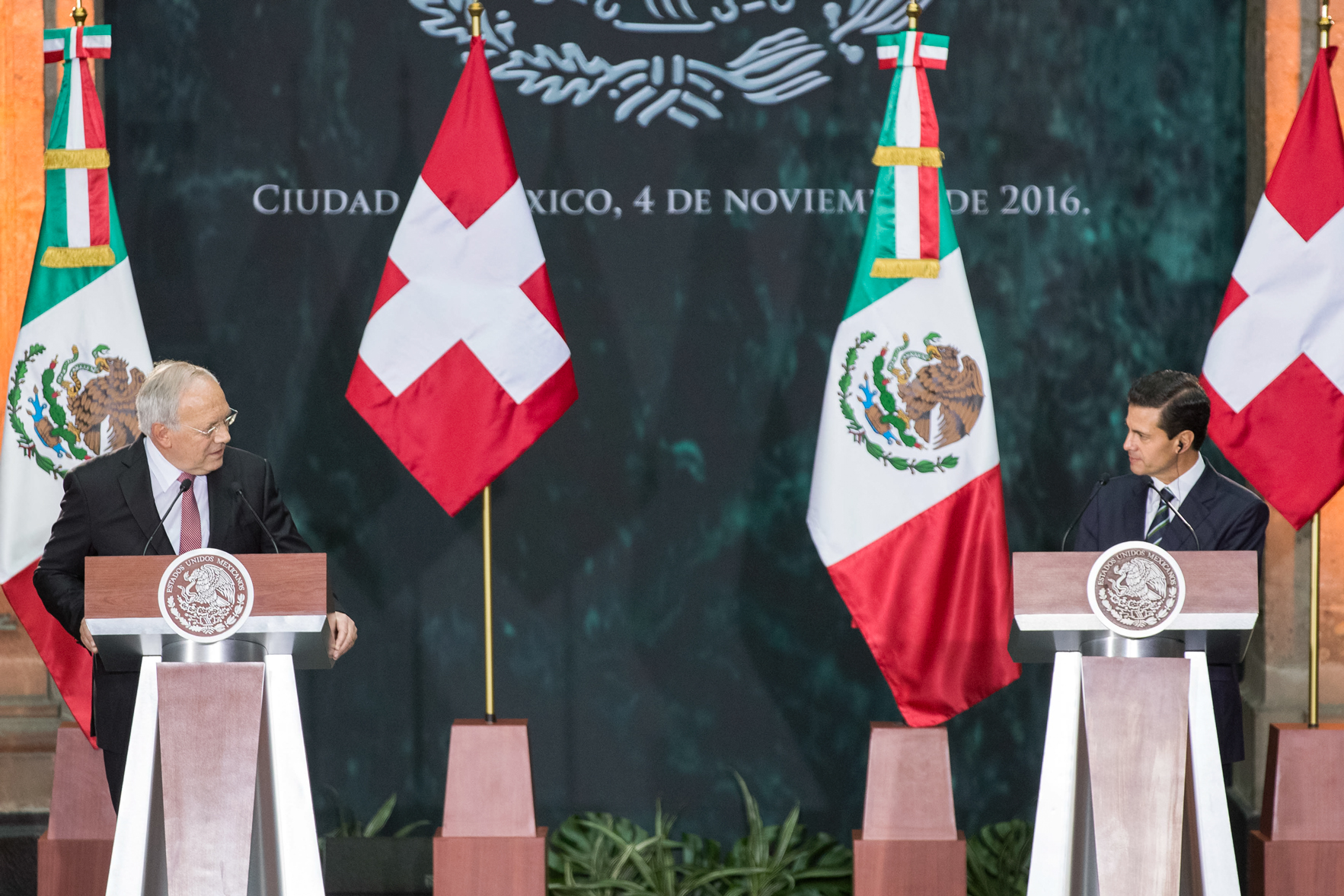
Swiss President Johann Schneider-Ammann on a visit to Mexico City, along with Mexican President Enrique Peña Nieto; November 2016.

High-level visits from Mexico to Switzerland

- President Carlos Salinas de Gortari (1990)
- President Ernesto Zedillo (1998)
- President Vicente Fox (2001, 2003, 2004)
- President Felipe Calderón (2007, 2009, 2010, 2011)
- President Enrique Peña Nieto (2014)
- Foreign Secretary Claudia Ruiz Massieu (2016)
- Foreign Secretary Alicia Bárcena (2024)

High-level visits from Switzerland to Mexico

- Foreign Minister Pierre Aubert (1984)
- Foreign Minister René Felber (1989)
- Economic Minister Jean-Pascal Delamuraz (1995)
- Economic Minister Pascal Couchepin (1998, 2000)
- President Joseph Deiss (2004)
- President Johann Schneider-Ammann (2013, 2016)
- President Guy Parmelin (2026)

== Bilateral agreements ==
Both nations have signed several bilateral agreements such as a Trade Agreement (1950); Memorandum of Understanding of Bilateral Cooperation (1991); Agreement on the Avoidance of Double-Taxation and Tax Evasion (1993); Agreement on the Promotion and Reciprocal Protection of Investments (1995); Memorandum of Understanding on Economic Cooperation (1998); Agreement in Agriculture Cooperation (2000); Treaty on Legal Assistance in Criminal Matters (2005); Agreement on Mutual Administrative Assistance in Customs Matters (2008); Memorandum of Understanding on the Cooperation between the Mexican Agency of International Cooperation for Development (AMEXCID) and the Swiss Agency for Development and Cooperation (2013); Agreement on Air Transportation (2016); Memorandum of Understanding in Health Cooperation (2016); Agreement regarding the Importation and Return of Cultural Property (2017) and an Agreement of Cinematographic Cooperation (2017).

== Education and diaspora ==
Colegio Suizo de México, a Swiss international primary and secondary school in Mexico catering to expatriate Swiss families; has campuses in Cuernavaca, Mexico City, and Querétaro City. In 2020, approximately 6,000 Swiss citizens resided in Mexico.

== Transportation ==
There are direct flights between Cancún and Zürich with Edelweiss Air.

== Trade relations ==
In 2001, Mexico signed a free trade agreement with the European Free Trade Association which includes Iceland, Liechtenstein, Norway and Switzerland. In 2023, two-way trade between Mexico and Switzerland amounted to US$3.4 billion. Between 1999 and 2016, Swiss companies invested more than US$9 billion in Mexico. Several Swiss multi-national companies are based and operate in Mexico, such as Credit Suisse, Holcim, Nestlé, Novartis, Roche and UBS. Mexican multinational companies such as Cemex and Vitro operate in Switzerland. In 2022, Mexican company FEMSA acquired a 97.7% stake in Swiss company Valora.

== Resident diplomatic missions ==
- Mexico has an embassy in Bern.
- Switzerland has an embassy in Mexico City.
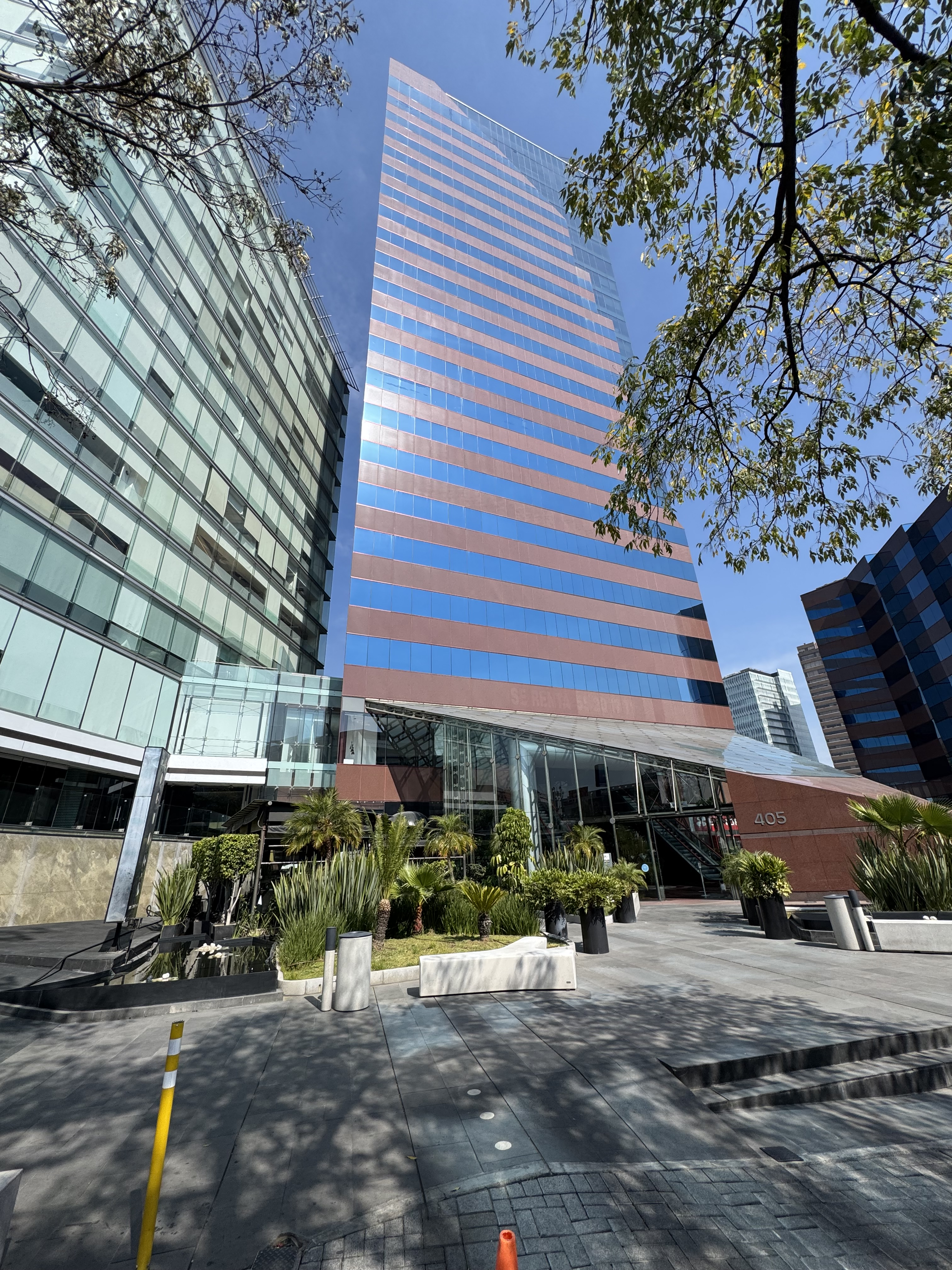
Building hosting the Embassy of Switzerland in Mexico City

== Gallery ==
Statue of Mexico's Father of the Nation Miguel Hidalgo y Costilla in Geneva

Flags of Mexico and Switzerland at the National Palace in Mexico City

== See also ==
- Swiss Mexicans
