= St. Francis of Assisi Church, Vienna =

Catholic church in Vienna, Austria

Coordinates: 48°13′27″N 16°24′18″E

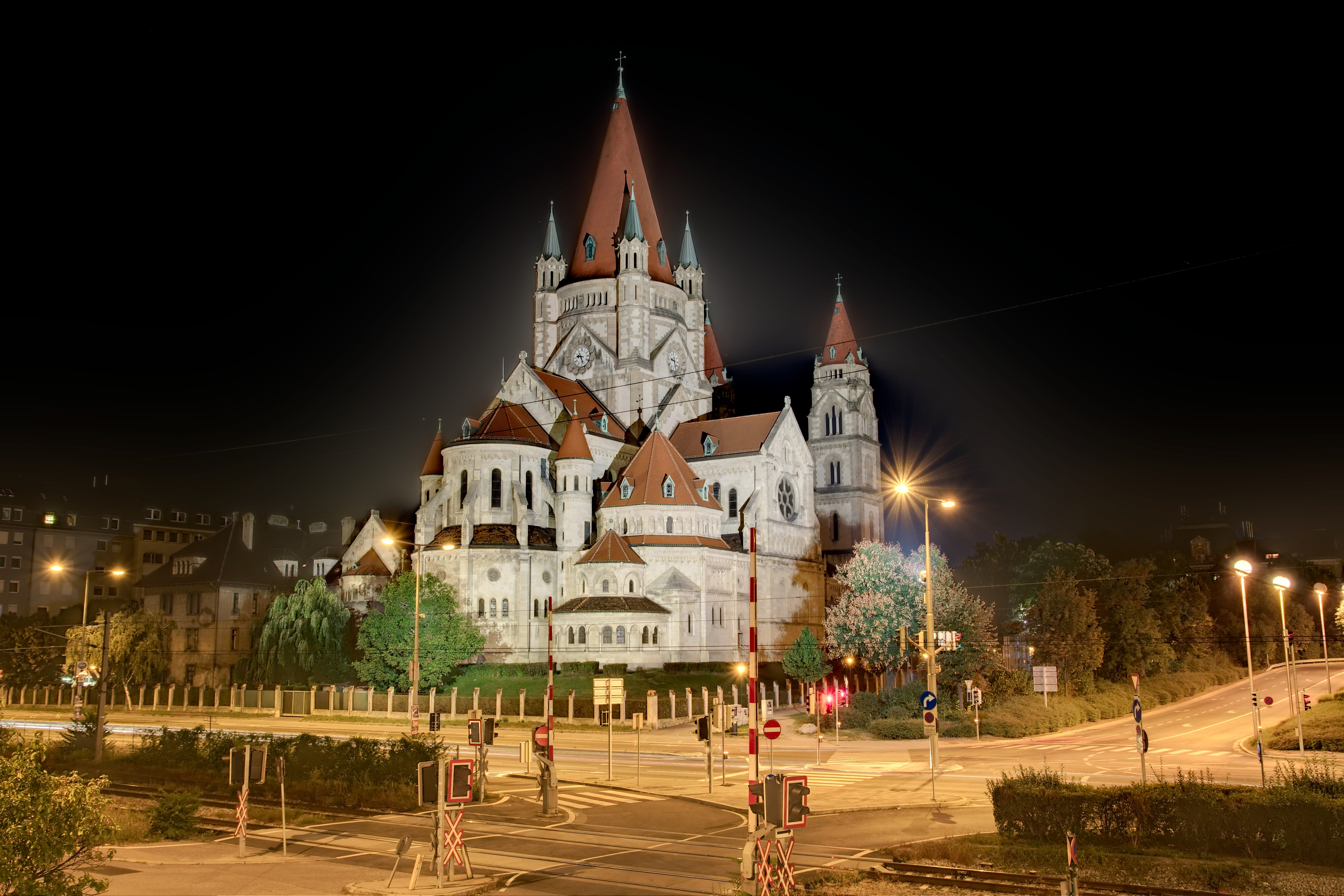
St. Francis of Assisi Church, Mexikoplatz, Vienna

St. Francis of Assisi Church (German: Kirche zum heiligen Franz von Assisi), also known as the Emperor's Jubilee Church (German: Kaiserjubiläumskirche) and the Mexico Church (German: Mexikokirche), is a Basilica-style Catholic church in Vienna, Austria. Built between 1898 and 1910, it was consecrated in 1913. It is located on the Mexikoplatz in Vienna's Second District, Leopoldstadt, and is administered by the Order of the Holy Trinity.

== History ==
The construction of the church celebrated the 50th anniversary of the reign of Emperor Franz Joseph I of Austria. A competition was held to select the design and was won by architect Victor Luntz. The four-bay, basilica-like brick building was intended as a garrison church; designed in the Rhenish-Romanesque style, its three red-tiled towers are visible several kilometres away.

The church, which is directly situated near the Danube, is now home to the Vienna English Speaking Catholic Community (VESCC) who have held weekly masses at the church since moving there in 2009.

The Mexikoplatz (Mexico Square), formerly known as Erzherzog-Karl-Platz (Archduke-Karl-Square), commemorates the fact that Mexico was the only country outside the Soviet Union to protest against the Anschluss of Austria to Nazi Germany.

== Elisabethkapelle ==
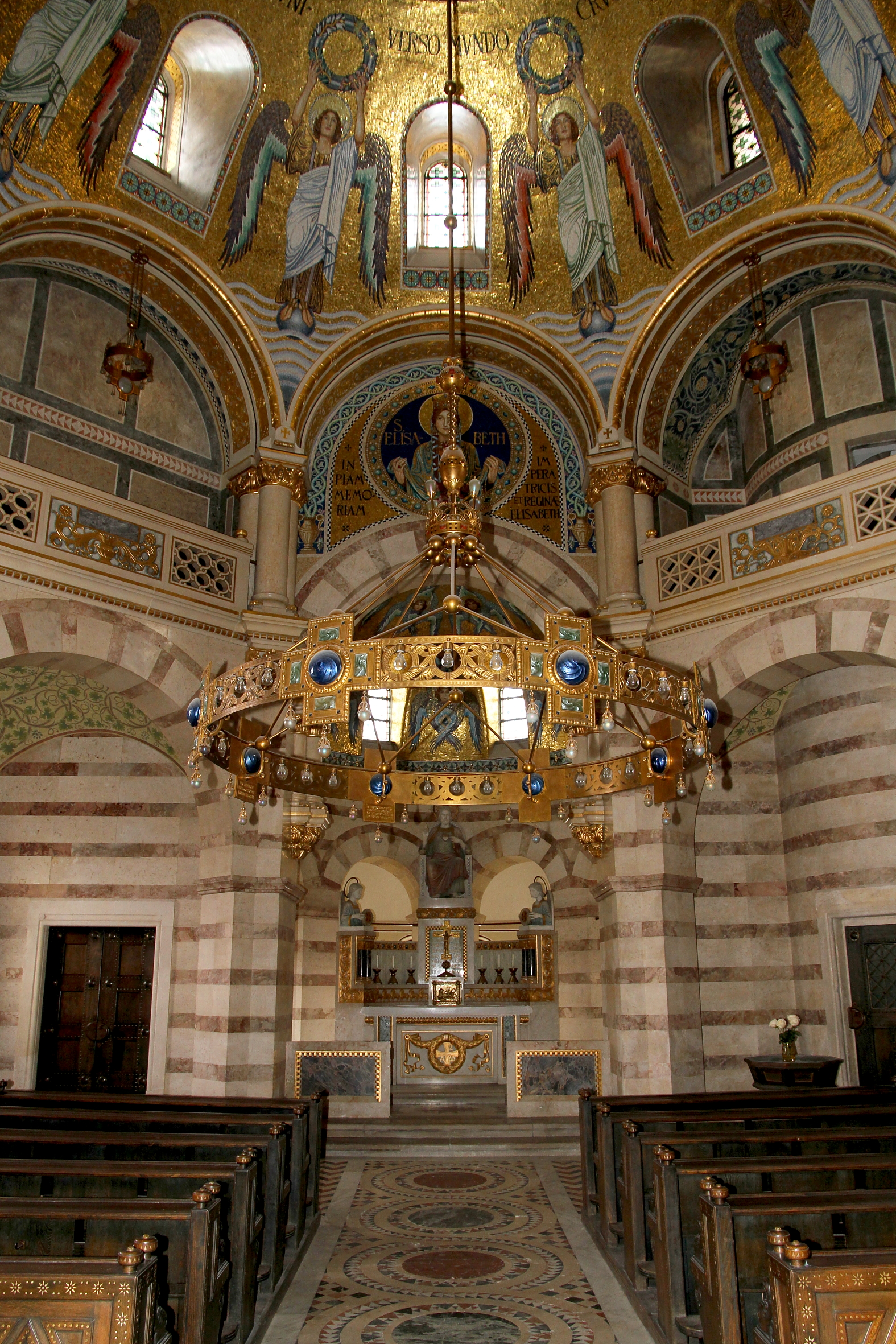
Elisabethkapelle

The Art Nouveau-style Elisabethkapelle (Elizabeth Chapel) is located on the left of the church next to the choir. It is 13.5 meters high and 10 metres wide. The octagonal chapel is modeled on the Palatine Chapel in the Aachen Cathedral, which was itself modelled on the Cappella Palatina in Palermo.

In 1898, the Italian anarchist Luigi Lucheni assassinated the wife of Emperor Franz Joseph I of Austria, Empress Elisabeth of Austria (commonly referred to as Sisi). To commemorate her, the Elisabethkapelle was established. It was financed through donations from the Red Cross, as Empress Elisabeth was the first Protector of the Red Cross.

Because of the Red Cross's large donation of 348,348 crowns, the chapel was decorated with gold mosaics rather than frescoes, and the walls were covered in marble rather than stucco. The mosaics were designed by Secession artist Carl Ederer. On the vault of the chancel there is a large mosaic of Saint Elizabeth of Hungary.

The chapel was completed in 1907 and consecrated on 10 June 1908.

== Gallery ==
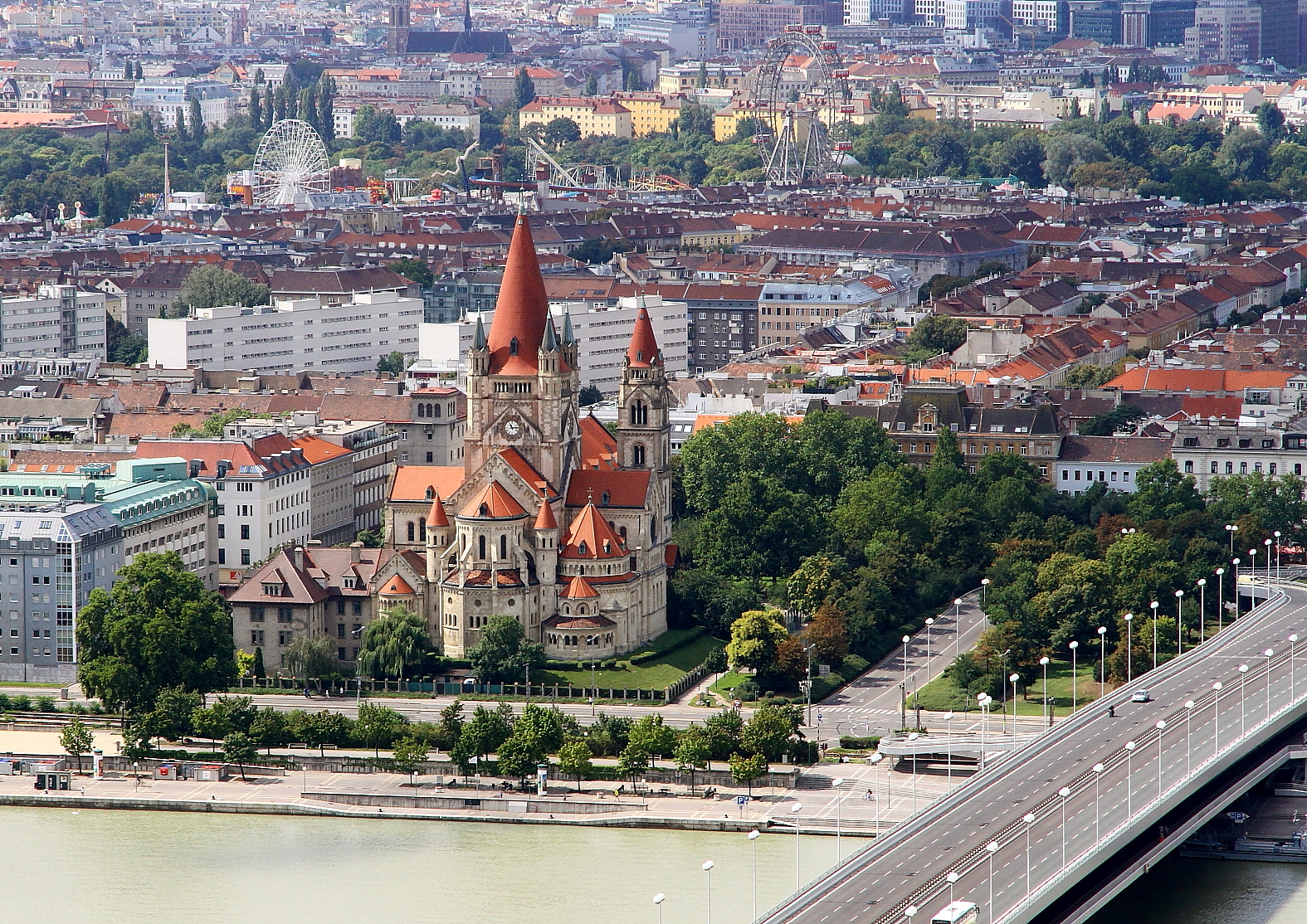
The church from the air, located at the southern end of the Mexikoplatz.

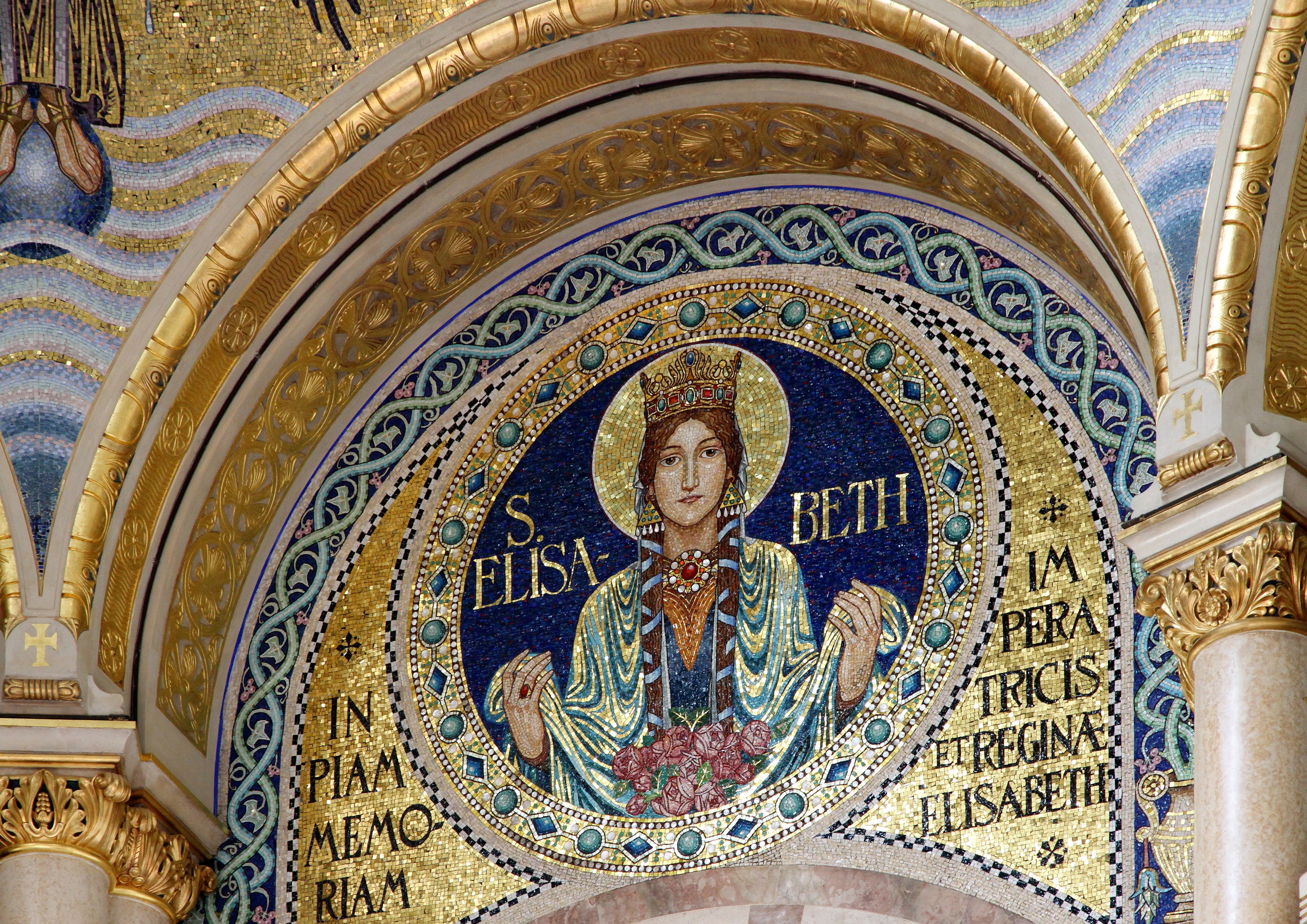
Detail from the ceiling of the Elisabethkapelle.

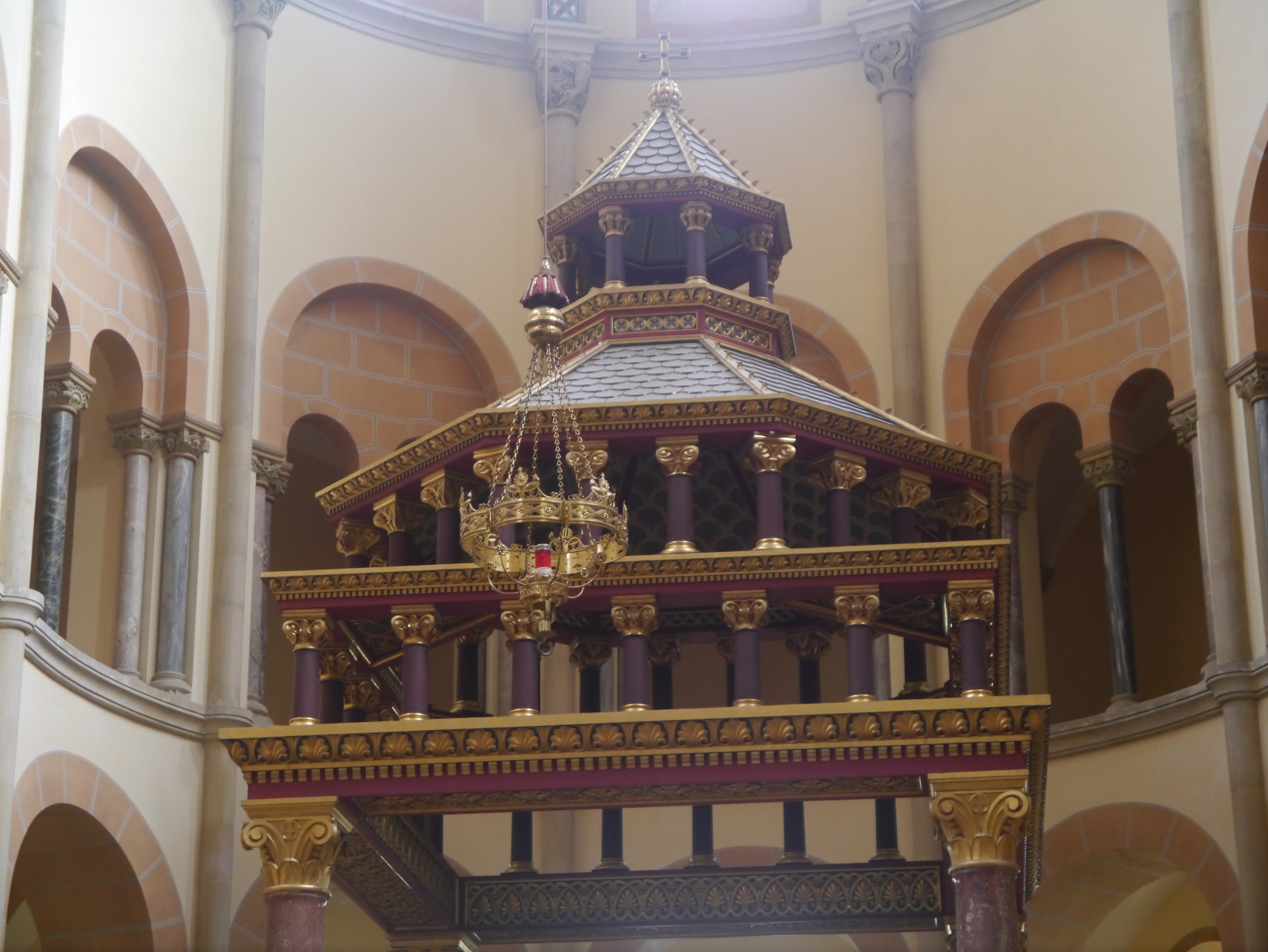
The baldachin of the main altar.

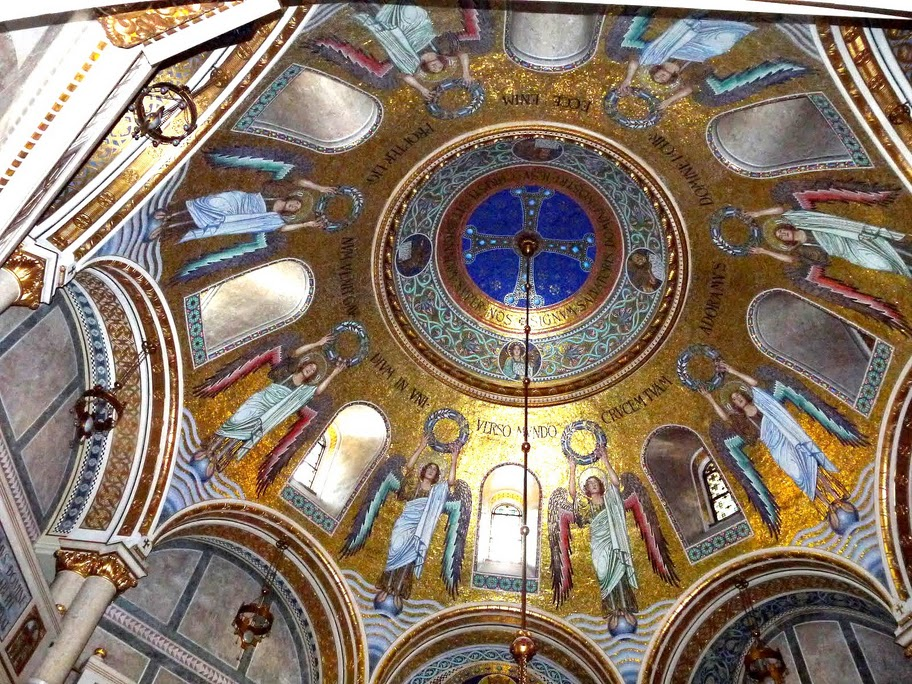
Detail of the main ceiling.

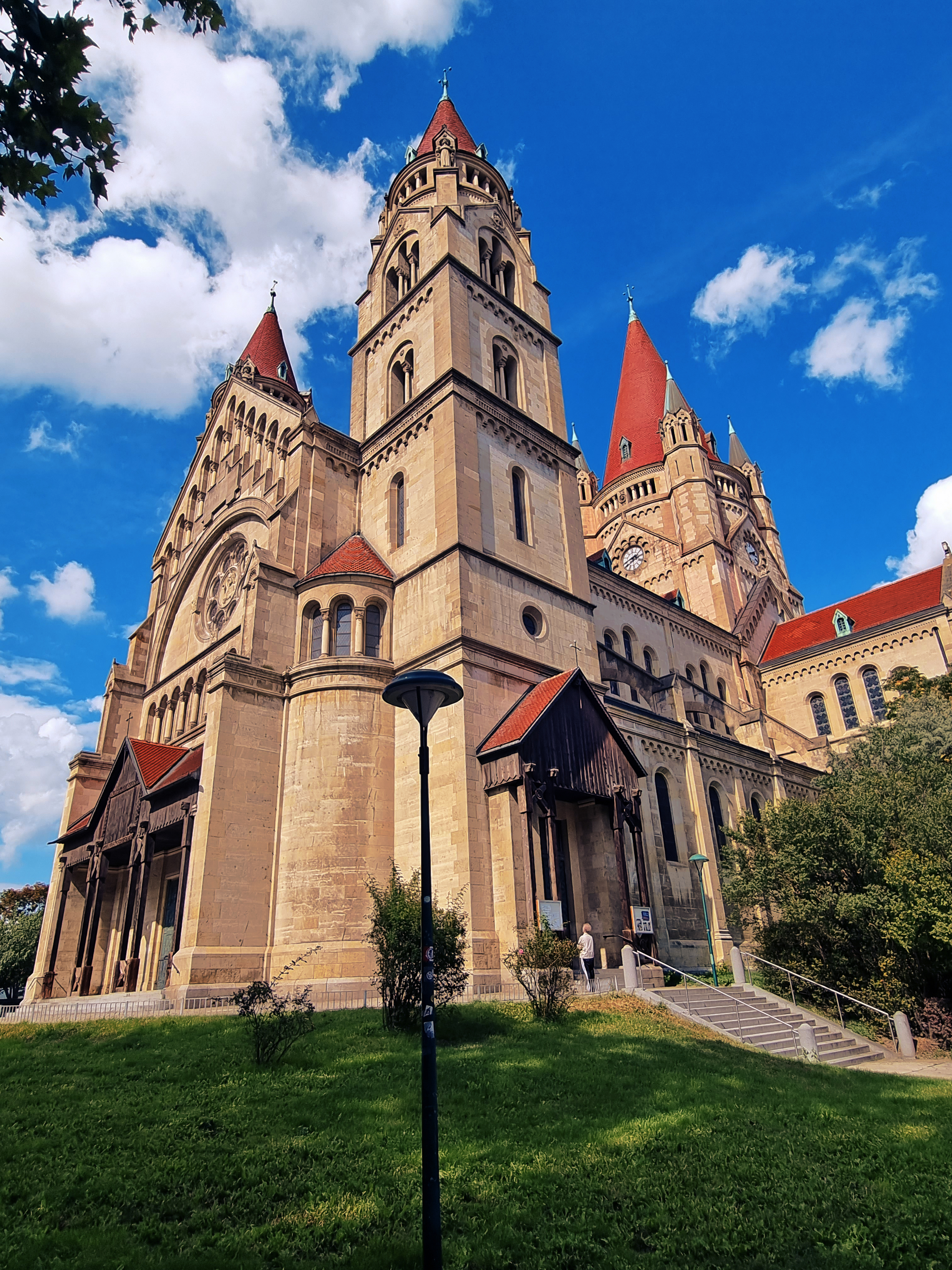

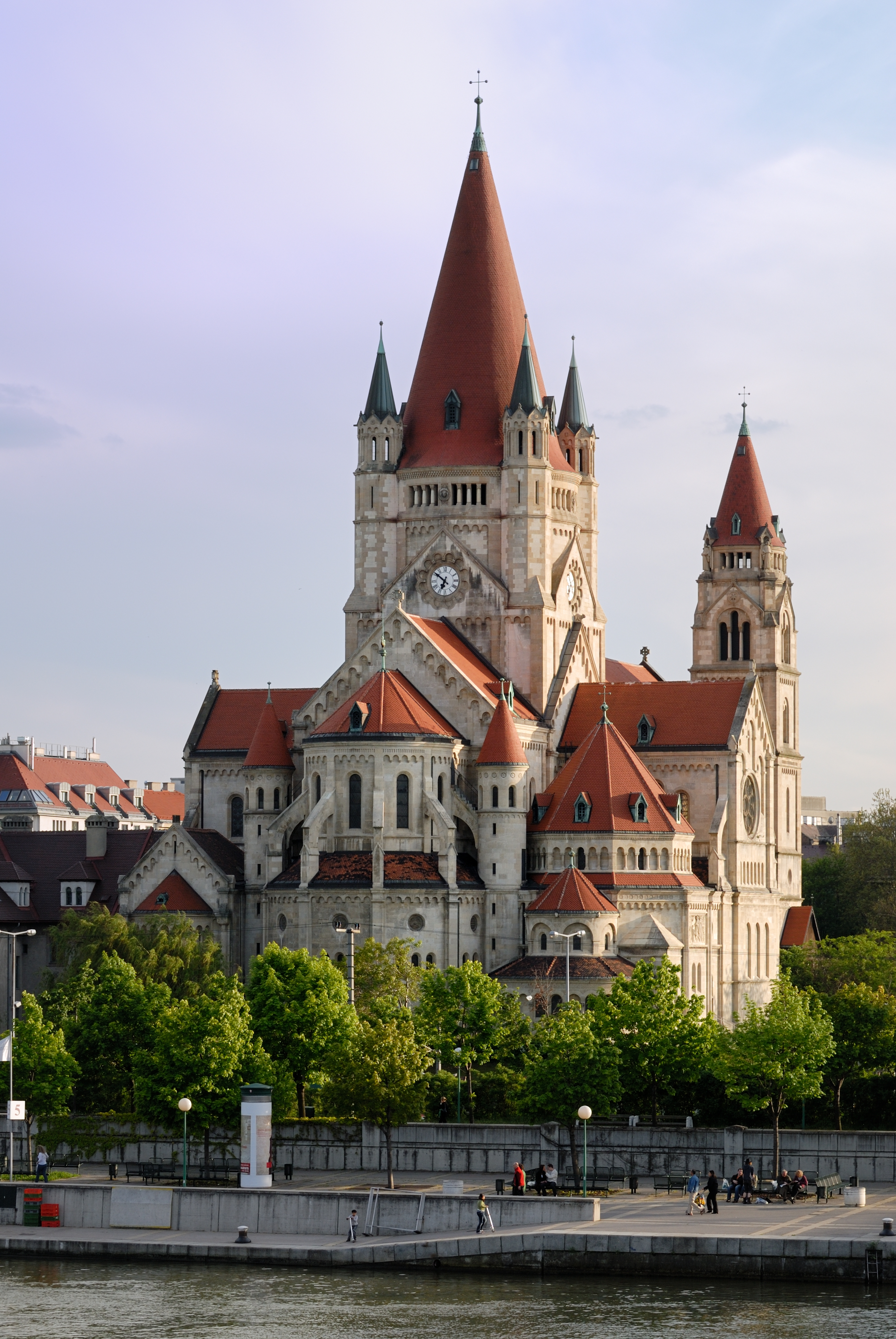
View on the church from bridge Reichsbrücke.

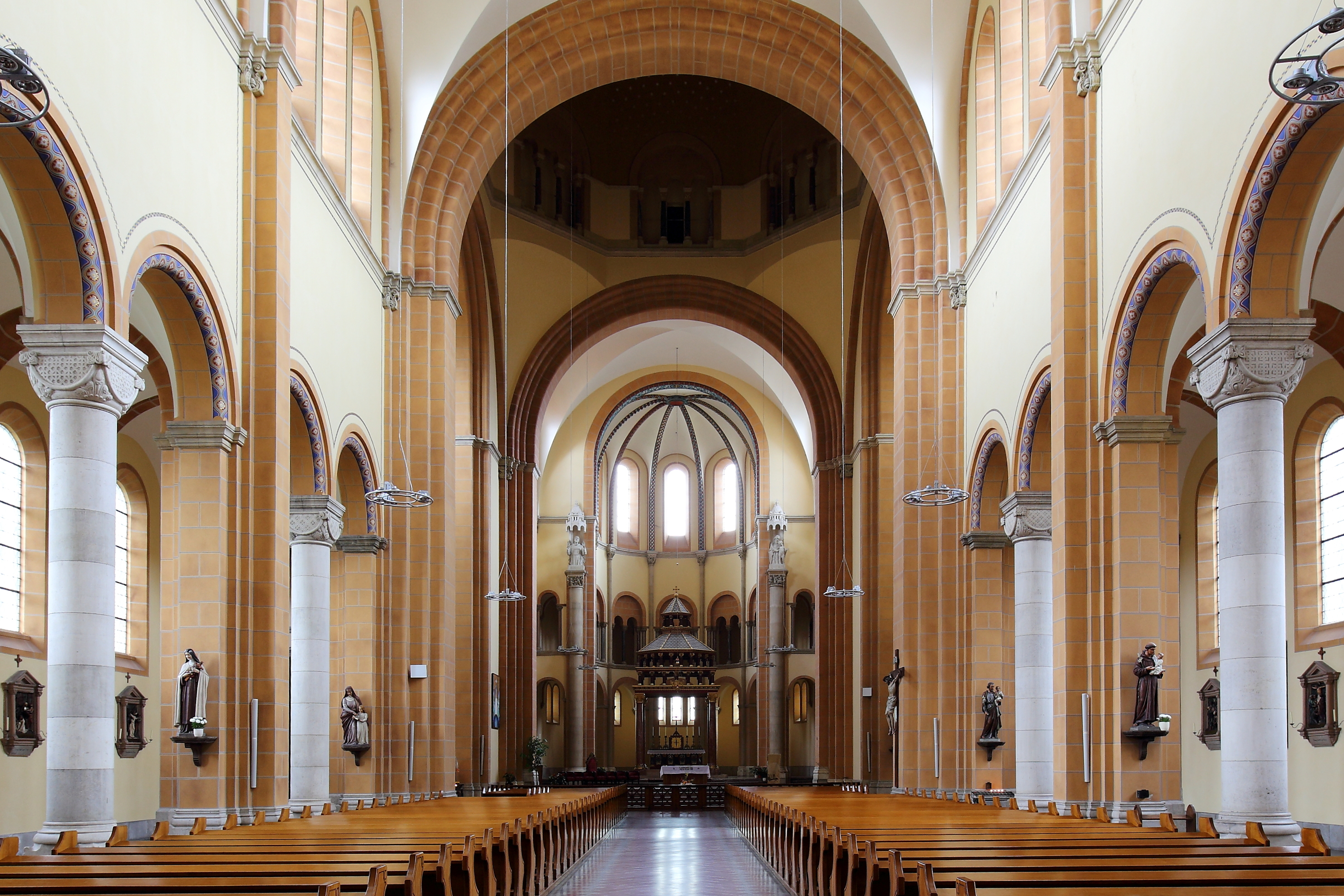
Indoor panorama

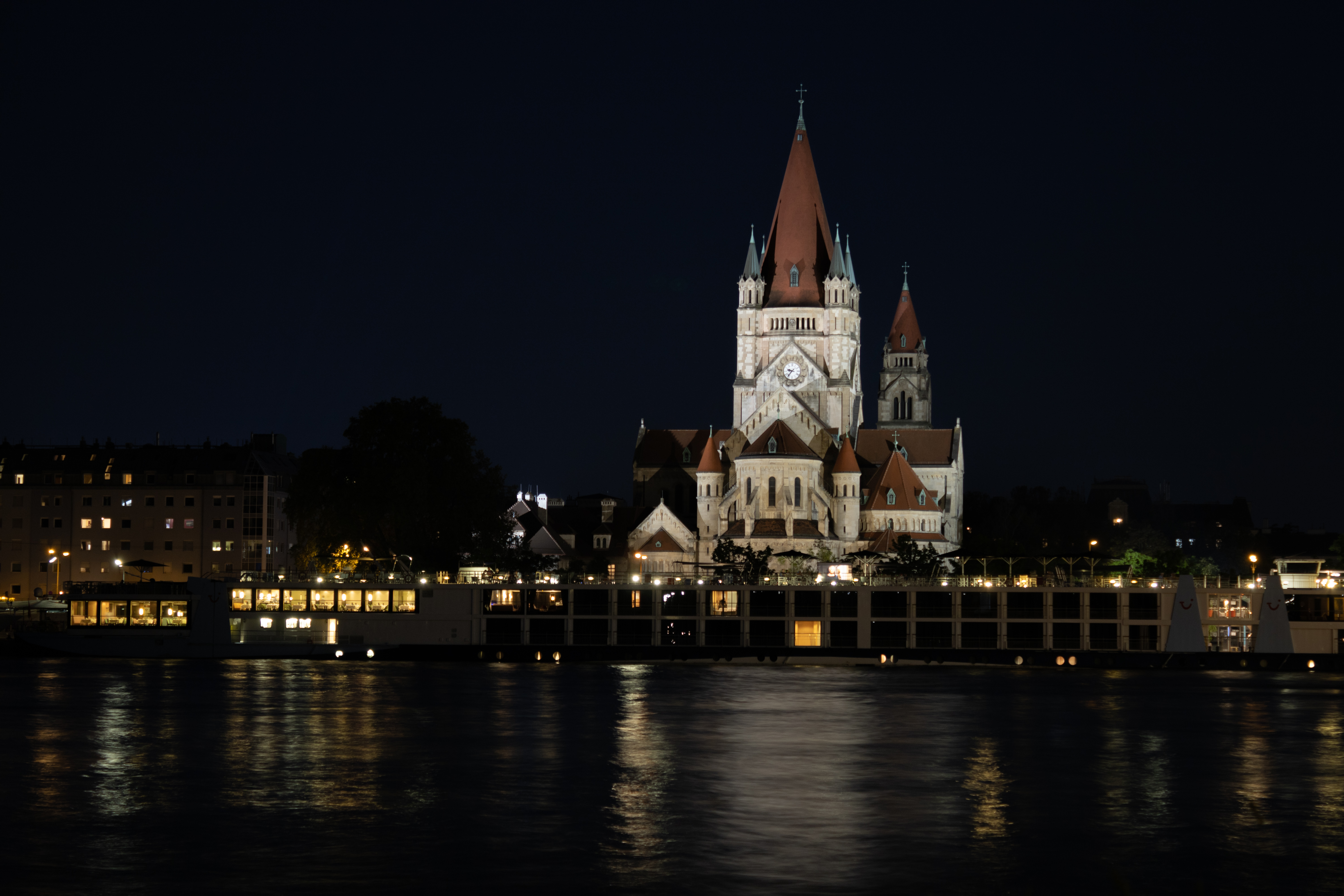
At night from across the Danube river.
