= Ana Casas Broda =

Mexican photographer

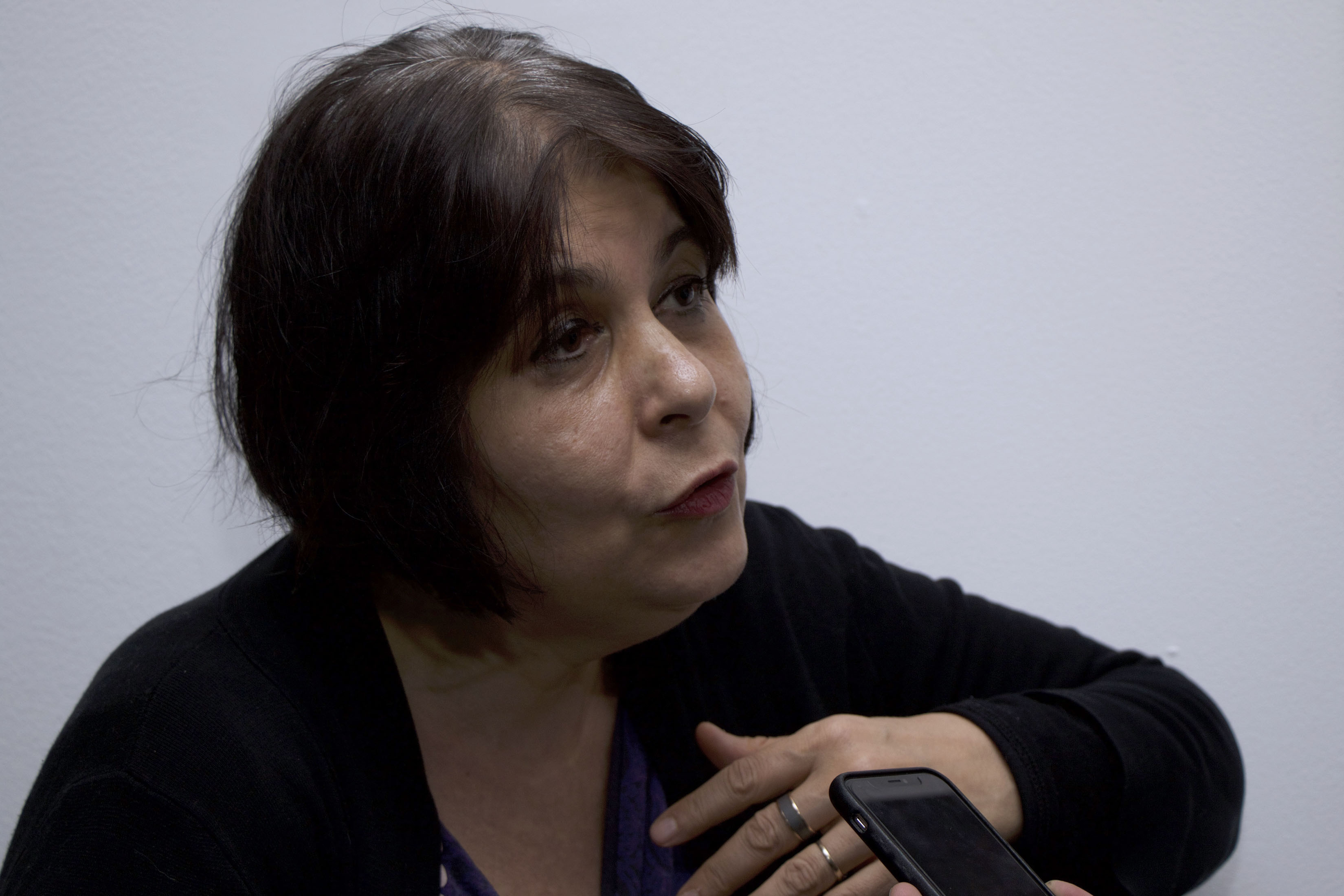
- Born: 1965 (age 60–61); Granada, Spain
- Occupation: Photographer
- Years active: 1983 to present
- Children: 2 sons

Ana Casas Broda (born 1965) is a Mexican photographer. She is known for her work Kinderwunsch (2013) which, created over seven years, explored "the joys and woes of motherhood, from sonograms and childbirth to playful adventures with her two sons".

== Life and work ==
Casas was born in 1965 in Granada, Spain. Her father was Spanish and her mother was Austrian and her first language was German. Her grandmother was a photographer whose photographs inspired Broda. Throughout her childhood, Casas moved back and forth between Spain and Austria. Her parents had a "broken marriage," which would later motivate Casas to "heal the old wounds" in her new family. In 1974, Broda and her mother moved to Mexico City.

She attended Casa de las Imágenes, Escuela Activa de Fotografía, the National University of Mexico, and the National School of Anthropology and History, studying photography, painting, and history. Broda began specializing in photography in 1983.

From 1989 to 1993, when she returned to Mexico City, she lived in Vienna and Madrid. Until 2002, she stayed in Vienna for periods of time to take care of her grandmother. Casas lives in Mexico City. She has two sons.

Over the course of seven years, Broda created, Kinderwunsch (2013), a photo series exploring the theme of motherhood.

In 2013 she listed Robert Frank, Hannah Wilke, and Elinor Carucci as among her influences.

== Publications ==
- Album. Mestizo Asociacion Cultural de Murcia, 2000. ISBN 978-8489356368. Text and photographs by Hilda Broda and Ana Casas Broda.
- Diet Journals.
- Kinderwunsch. Madrid: La Fabrica, 2013. ISBN 978-8415691433.
