= Colegio Suizo de México =

Swiss-education school in Mexico

Colegio Suizo de México, A.C.
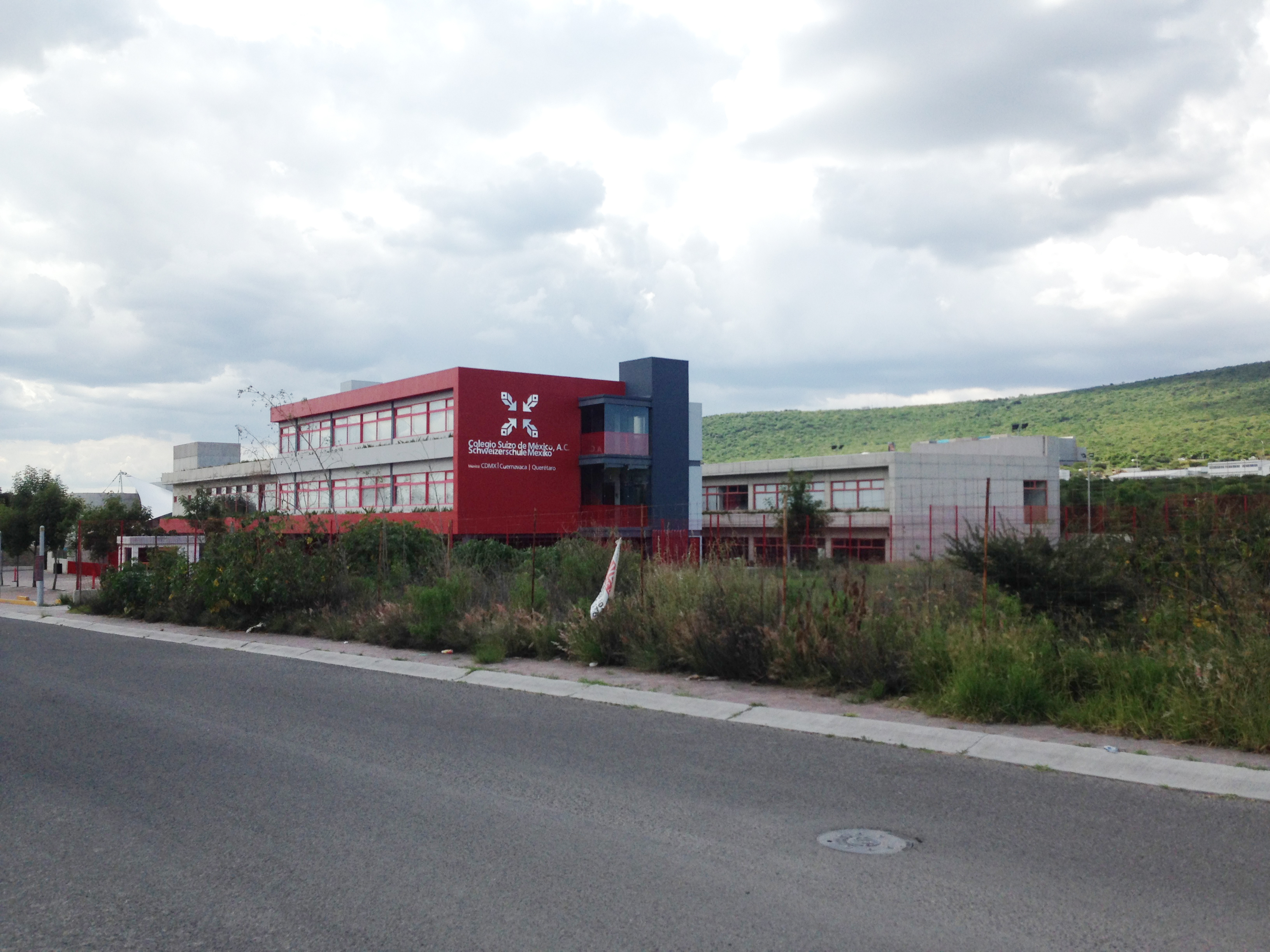
- Colegio Suizo de México Campus Querétaro

Location
- 19.3858°N 99.1632°W

Information
- Type: Private, International school
- Established: 1965
- Grades: Maternal - Preparatoria
- Gender: Coeducational
- Education system: Swiss education system
- Language: Spanish, German
- Campuses: 3
- Campus: Mexico City, Cuernavaca, Querétaro
- Nickname: CSM
- Website: www.csm.edu.mx

Campuses in Mexico

The Colegio Suizo de México, A.C. (CSM, Spanish: "Swiss College of Mexico", German: Schweizerschule Mexiko) is a Swiss-education school with three campuses in Mexico. The Campus México is in Colonia del Valle, Benito Juárez, Mexico City. The Campus Cuernavaca is in Cuernavaca, Morelos. The Campus Querétaro is in Querétaro City, Querétaro. It serves levels maternal to preparatoria.

== History ==
The school was founded in 1965 with 135 students. The first campus was on Calle Eugenia. The secundaria opened in 1968. The CCH high school program opened in 1971, with the first graduates in 1974. A new auditorium opened in 1973. The Cuernavaca campus opened in 1992, and it gained a secundaria in 1998. The same year, the Mexico City campus gained the secundaria B. The Querétaro campus opened in 2007.

== See also ==
- Mexico–Switzerland relations
