= Rudolph Pokorny =

Austro-Mexican chess player

Rudolph (Rudolf) Pokorny (1880 in Tišnov, Moravia – ?) was an Austro-Mexican chess player.

Born in Tischnowitz (now Tišnov), he moved to America (Mexico and the United States). He was a manager of the hair-dressing parlors of Rudolph Pokorny & Co.

He took 6th at New York 1920 (Oscar Chajes won), and took 11th at New York 1920 (Dawid Janowski and R.T. Black won).
