= Mexikoplatz =

Square in Vienna

- Square
- Former names: Erzherzog-Karl-Platz; Volkswehrplatz
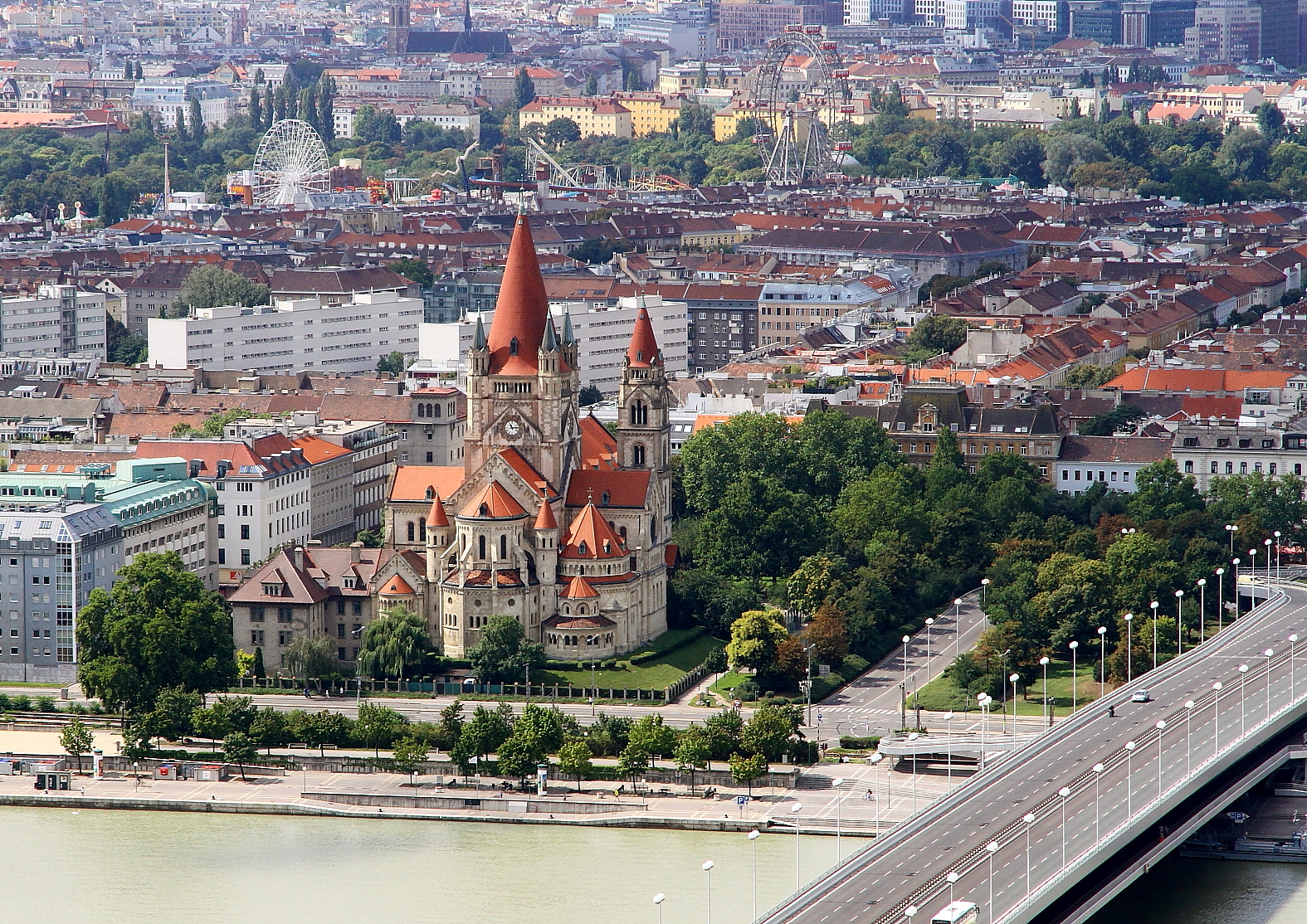
- St. Francis of Assisi Church and the Mexikoplatz
- Features: St Francis of Assisi Church
- Opened: 1884
- Dedicated to: Mexican protesters of the Anschluss
- Location: Leopoldstadt, Vienna, Austria
- Location within Austria
- Coordinates: 48.226570°N 16.404700°E

Mexikoplatz (Mexico Square) is a square in the Austrian capital Vienna. It is located in the city's 2nd district, Leopoldstadt, near the banks of the Danube, on the southwestern end of the Reichsbrücke (Empire Bridge), which links Leopoldstadt with Donaustadt, the 22nd district of Vienna.

== Overview ==
The square was named Mexikoplatz in 1956, to honor the support Mexico (led by President Lázaro Cárdenas) gave to Austria in 1938, when it was the only country at the time to protest the Anschluss (annexation) of Austria by Nazi Germany. Mexico was the only nation to file a formal complaint with the League of Nations, publicly denouncing the annexation as an attack on international law.

In honor of Isidro Fabela, the Mexican ambassador who led this protest at the League of Nations, the promenade where the Vienna headquarters of the United Nations is located was named after him.

Previously it was named "Erzherzog-Karl-Platz", after Archduke Charles of Austria, from 1884 to 1919 and from 1934 to 1956, respectively. From 1919 to 1934, it was called Volkswehrplatz (after the peoples' militias that were formed in Austria after World War I).

A church named St Francis of Assisi Church is located in the southeastern part of the square. It was consecrated in 1898, in celebration of the Golden Crown Jubilee of Emperor Francis Joseph.
