= Düsseldorf II =

Federal electoral district of Germany

106 Düsseldorf II
- Electoral district for the Bundestag
- Düsseldorf II in 2025
- State: North Rhine-Westphalia
- Population: 290,100 (2019)
- Electorate: 190,102 (2021)
- Major settlements: Düsseldorf (partial)
- Area: 87.8 km^{2}

Current electoral district
- Created: 1949
- Party: CDU
- Member: Johannes Winkel
- Elected: 2025

Düsseldorf II is an electoral constituency (German: Wahlkreis) represented in the Bundestag. It elects one member via first-past-the-post voting. Under the current constituency numbering system, it is designated as constituency 106. It is located in western North Rhine-Westphalia, comprising the southern part of the city of Düsseldorf.

Düsseldorf II was created for the inaugural 1949 federal election. From 2021 to 2025, it was represented by Andreas Rimkus of the Social Democratic Party (SPD). Since 2025 it has been represented by Johannes Winkel of the CDU.

== Geography ==
Düsseldorf II is located in western North Rhine-Westphalia. As of the 2021 federal election, it comprises the southern part of the independent city of Düsseldorf, specifically districts 3, 8, 9, and 10.

== History ==
Düsseldorf I was created in 1949. In the 1949 election, it was North Rhine-Westphalia constituency 20 in the numbering system. From 1953 through 1961, it was number 79. From 1965 through 1998, it was number 75. From 2002 through 2009, it was number 108. In the 2013 through 2021 elections, it was number 107. Since the 2025 election, it has been number 106.

Originally, the constituency comprised the current districts 2, 6 (excluding Lichtenbroich and Unterrath), 7 (excluding Hubbelrath and Knittkuhl), 8 (excluding Unterbach, 9, 10, and Düsseldorf-Oberbilk from 3. From 1965 through 1976, it comprised districts 6 (excluding Lichtenbroich and Unterrath), 7 (excluding Hubbelrath and Knittkuhl), 8 (excluding Unterbach), as well as Flingern from 2 and Oberbilk from 3. It acquired its current borders in the 1980 election.

| Election | No. | Name | Borders |
|---|---|---|---|
| 1949 | 20 | Düsseldorf II | Düsseldorf city (only 2, 3 (only Düsseldorf-Oberbilk), 6 (excluding Lichtenbroich and Unterrath), 7 (excluding Hubbelrath and Knittkuhl), 8 (excluding Unterbach, 9, and 10 districts) |
| 1953 | 79 | Düsseldorf II | Düsseldorf city (only 2, 3 (only Düsseldorf-Oberbilk), 6 (excluding Lichtenbroich and Unterrath), 7 (excluding Hubbelrath and Knittkuhl), 8 (excluding Unterbach, 9, and 10 districts) |
| 1957 | 79 | Düsseldorf II | Düsseldorf city (only 2, 3 (only Düsseldorf-Oberbilk), 6 (excluding Lichtenbroich and Unterrath), 7 (excluding Hubbelrath and Knittkuhl), 8 (excluding Unterbach, 9, and 10 districts) |
| 1961 | 79 | Düsseldorf II | Düsseldorf city (only 2, 3 (only Düsseldorf-Oberbilk), 6 (excluding Lichtenbroich and Unterrath), 7 (excluding Hubbelrath and Knittkuhl), 8 (excluding Unterbach, 9, and 10 districts) |
| 1965 | 75 | Düsseldorf II | Düsseldorf city (only 2 (only Flingern), 3 (only Düsseldorf-Oberbilk), 6 (excluding Lichtenbroich and Unterrath), 7 (excluding Hubbelrath and Knittkuhl), and 8 (excluding Unterbach) districts) |
| 1969 | 75 | Düsseldorf II | Düsseldorf city (only 2 (only Flingern), 3 (only Düsseldorf-Oberbilk), 6 (excluding Lichtenbroich and Unterrath), 7 (excluding Hubbelrath and Knittkuhl), and 8 (excluding Unterbach) districts) |
| 1972 | 75 | Düsseldorf II | Düsseldorf city (only 2 (only Flingern), 3 (only Düsseldorf-Oberbilk), 6 (excluding Lichtenbroich and Unterrath), 7 (excluding Hubbelrath and Knittkuhl), and 8 (excluding Unterbach) districts) |
| 1976 | 75 | Düsseldorf II | Düsseldorf city (only 2 (only Flingern), 3 (only Düsseldorf-Oberbilk), 6 (excluding Lichtenbroich and Unterrath), 7 (excluding Hubbelrath and Knittkuhl), and 8 (excluding Unterbach) districts) |
| 1980 | 75 | Düsseldorf II | Düsseldorf city (only 3, 8, 9, and 10 districts) |
| 1983 | 75 | Düsseldorf II | Düsseldorf city (only 3, 8, 9, and 10 districts) |
| 1987 | 75 | Düsseldorf II | Düsseldorf city (only 3, 8, 9, and 10 districts) |
| 1990 | 75 | Düsseldorf II | Düsseldorf city (only 3, 8, 9, and 10 districts) |
| 1994 | 75 | Düsseldorf II | Düsseldorf city (only 3, 8, 9, and 10 districts) |
| 1998 | 75 | Düsseldorf II | Düsseldorf city (only 3, 8, 9, and 10 districts) |
| 2002 | 108 | Düsseldorf II | Düsseldorf city (only 3, 8, 9, and 10 districts) |
| 2005 | 108 | Düsseldorf II | Düsseldorf city (only 3, 8, 9, and 10 districts) |
| 2009 | 108 | Düsseldorf II | Düsseldorf city (only 3, 8, 9, and 10 districts) |
| 2013 | 107 | Düsseldorf II | Düsseldorf city (only 3, 8, 9, and 10 districts) |
| 2017 | 107 | Düsseldorf II | Düsseldorf city (only 3, 8, 9, and 10 districts) |
| 2021 | 107 | Düsseldorf II | Düsseldorf city (only 3, 8, 9, and 10 districts) |
| 2025 | 106 | Düsseldorf II | Düsseldorf city (only 3, 8, 9, and 10 districts) |

== Members ==
The constituency was first represented by Josef Gockeln of the Christian Democratic Union (CDU) from 1949 to 1953. He was succeeded by fellow CDU member Johannes Caspers from 1953 to 1961, followed by Georg Schulhoff until 1965. Helmut Lenders of the Social Democratic Party (SPD) was elected in 1965 and served until 1980. Manfred Geßner of the SPD then served a single term. The SPD retained the seat in 1983 with candidate Volker Jung, who served until 2002. He was succeeded by Karin Kortmann from 2002 to 2009. Beatrix Philipp of the CDU became representative in the 2009 election, and was succeeded by Sylvia Pantel in 2013. Andreas Rimkus regained the constituency for the SPD in 2021. In 2025 Johannes Winkel regained the seat for the CDU

| Election | Member | Party | % |
|---|---|---|---|
| 1949 | Josef Gockeln | CDU | 37.2 |
| 1953 | Johannes Caspers | CDU | 49.9 |
| 1957 | Johannes Caspers | CDU | 52.7 |
| 1961 | Georg Schulhoff | CDU | 44.1 |
| 1965 | Helmut Lenders | SPD | 48.6 |
| 1969 | Helmut Lenders | SPD | 53.5 |
| 1972 | Helmut Lenders | SPD | 57.6 |
| 1976 | Helmut Lenders | SPD | 52.4 |
| 1980 | Manfred Geßner | SPD | 50.2 |
| 1983 | Volker Jung | SPD | 48.6 |
| 1987 | Volker Jung | SPD | 44.5 |
| 1990 | Volker Jung | SPD | 44.6 |
| 1994 | Volker Jung | SPD | 46.8 |
| 1998 | Volker Jung | SPD | 50.3 |
| 2002 | Karin Kortmann | SPD | 49.6 |
| 2005 | Karin Kortmann | SPD | 45.9 |
| 2009 | Beatrix Philipp | CDU | 37.7 |
| 2013 | Sylvia Pantel | CDU | 40.7 |
| 2017 | Sylvia Pantel | CDU | 33.8 |
| 2021 | Andreas Rimkus | SPD | 29.2 |
| 2025 | Johannes Winkel | CDU | 28.7 |

== Election results ==
=== 2025 election ===
Federal election (2025): Düsseldorf II
| Notes: | Blue background denotes the winner of the electorate vote. Pink background denotes a candidate elected from their party list. Yellow background denotes an electorate win by a list member, or other incumbent. A ✓ or ✗ denotes status of any incumbent, win or lose respectively. | | | | | | |
| Party | Candidate | Votes | % | ±% | Party votes | % | ±% |
|---|---|---|---|---|---|---|---|
| CDU | Johannes Winkel | 43,282 | 28.7 | ▲4.1 | 38,006 | 25.1 | ▲2.8 |
| SPD | Adis Selimi | 34,739 | 23.1 | ▼6.1 | 28,535 | 18.9 | ▼6.3 |
| Greens | Sara Nanni | 27,347 | 18.2 | ▼3.2 | 25,780 | 17.1 | ▼5.2 |
| AfD | Andrea Kraljic | 19,574 | 13.0 | ▲7.2 | 19,606 | 13.0 | ▲7.0 |
| Left | Lisa Schubert | 14,024 | 9.3 | ▲5.5 | 17,800 | 11.8 | ▲6.9 |
| BSW | | | | | 7,246 | 4.8 | |
| FDP | Lida Azarnoosh | 6,250 | 4.1 | ▼5.9 | 8,236 | 5.4 | ▼6.8 |
| Volt | France Noltekuhlemann | 2,641 | 1.8 | ▲0.9 | 1,570 | 1.0 | ▲0.4 |
| Tierschutzpartei | | | | | 1,671 | 1.1 | ▼0.2 |
| FW | Howik Babachanjan | 934 | 0.6 | ▼0.3 | 484 | 0.3 | ▼0.3 |
| PARTEI | | | | ▼2.1 | 771 | 0.5 | ▼0.6 |
| BD | Tobias Ulbrich | 729 | 0.5 | | 230 | 0.2 | |
| Values | Sylvia Pantel | 719 | 0.5 | | 237 | 0.2 | |
| MLPD | Daniela Maus | 366 | 0.2 | ▲0.1 | 77 | 0.1 | 0.0 |
| Team Todenhöfer | | | | | 314 | 0.2 | ▼1.0 |
| dieBasis | | | | ▼1.1 | 234 | 0.2 | ▼0.8 |
| PdF | | | | | 232 | 0.2 | ▲0.1 |
| MERA25 | | | | | 123 | 0.1 | |
| Pirates | | | | | | | ▼0.4 |
| Gesundheitsforschung | | | | | | | ▼0.1 |
| Humanists | | | | | | | ▼0.1 |
| ÖDP | | | | | | | ▼0.1 |
| Bündnis C | | | | | | 0.0 | 0.0 |
| SGP | | | | | | 0.0 | 0.0 |
| Informal votes | | 1,303 | | | 756 | | |
| Total valid votes | | 150,605 | | | 151,152 | | |
| Turnout | | 151,908 | 80.4 | ▲5.6 | | | |
| CDU gain from SPD | Majority | 8,543 | 5.6 | | | | |

=== 2021 election ===
Federal election (2021): Düsseldorf II
| Notes: | Blue background denotes the winner of the electorate vote. Pink background denotes a candidate elected from their party list. Yellow background denotes an electorate win by a list member, or other incumbent. A ✓ or ✗ denotes status of any incumbent, win or lose respectively. | | | | | | |
| Party | Candidate | Votes | % | ±% | Party votes | % | ±% |
|---|---|---|---|---|---|---|---|
| SPD | Andreas Rimkus | 41,169 | 29.2 | ▲1.9 | 35,671 | 25.2 | ▲1.9 |
| CDU | ✗ Sylvia Pantel | 34,801 | 24.7 | ▼9.2 | 31,639 | 22.4 | ▼6.1 |
| Greens | Sara Nanni | 30,201 | 21.4 | ▲13.1 | 31,524 | 22.3 | ▲12.2 |
| FDP | Christoph Stork | 14,143 | 10.0 | ▲0.8 | 17,335 | 12.3 | ▼2.7 |
| AfD | Uta Opelt | 8,214 | 5.8 | ▼2.3 | 8,503 | 6.0 | ▼3.1 |
| Left | Julia Susanne Marmulla | 5,418 | 3.8 | ▼9.2 | 6,931 | 4.9 | ▼5.0 |
| Tierschutzpartei | | | | | 1,831 | 1.3 | ▲0.5 |
| Team Todenhöfer | | | | | 1,674 | 1.2 | |
| PARTEI | Robin Bartz | 2,967 | 2.1 | | 1,572 | 1.1 | 0.0 |
| dieBasis | Lucia Petarus | 1,549 | 1.1 | | 1,280 | 0.9 | |
| FW | Hans-Joachim Grumbach | 1,307 | 0.9 | | 859 | 0.6 | ▲0.3 |
| Volt | Falk Thörmer | 1,189 | 0.8 | | 873 | 0.6 | |
| Pirates | | | | | 517 | 0.4 | ▼0.1 |
| Gesundheitsforschung | | | | | 147 | 0.1 | 0.0 |
| LIEBE | | | | | 143 | 0.1 | |
| Humanists | | | | | 141 | 0.1 | 0.0 |
| LfK | | | | | 139 | 0.1 | |
| V-Partei3 | | | | | 129 | 0.1 | 0.0 |
| ÖDP | | | | | 90 | 0.1 | 0.0 |
| NPD | | | | | 81 | 0.1 | ▼0.1 |
| du. | | | | | 77 | 0.1 | |
| MLPD | Daniela Maus | 176 | 0.1 | ▼0.1 | 66 | 0.0 | 0.0 |
| DKP | | | | | 62 | 0.0 | 0.0 |
| PdF | | | | | 55 | 0.0 | |
| Bündnis C | | | | | 49 | 0.0 | |
| LKR | | | | | 28 | 0.0 | |
| SGP | | | | | 16 | 0.0 | 0.0 |
| Informal votes | | 1,153 | | | 855 | | |
| Total valid votes | | 141,134 | | | 141,432 | | |
| Turnout | | 142,287 | 74.8 | ▲0.5 | | | |
| SPD gain from CDU | Majority | 6,368 | 4.5 | | | | |

=== 2017 election ===
Federal election (2017): Düsseldorf II
| Notes: | Blue background denotes the winner of the electorate vote. Pink background denotes a candidate elected from their party list. Yellow background denotes an electorate win by a list member, or other incumbent. A ✓ or ✗ denotes status of any incumbent, win or lose respectively. | | | | | | |
| Party | Candidate | Votes | % | ±% | Party votes | % | ±% |
|---|---|---|---|---|---|---|---|
| CDU | ✓ Sylvia Pantel | 47,950 | 33.8 | ▼6.9 | 40,606 | 28.5 | ▼8.5 |
| SPD | Andreas Rimkus | 38,727 | 27.3 | ▼7.7 | 33,218 | 23.3 | ▼6.9 |
| Left | Sahra Wagenknecht | 18,499 | 13.0 | ▲3.9 | 14,111 | 9.9 | ▲2.1 |
| FDP | Sebastian Rehne | 13,049 | 9.2 | ▲6.3 | 21,277 | 14.9 | ▲9.1 |
| Greens | Uwe Marold Warnecke | 11,778 | 8.3 | ▲0.8 | 14,379 | 10.1 | ▲0.4 |
| AfD | Jessica Malisch | 11,530 | 8.1 | | 12,968 | 9.1 | ▲4.9 |
| PARTEI | | | | | 1,589 | 1.1 | ▲0.7 |
| Tierschutzpartei | | | | | 1,098 | 0.8 | |
| Pirates | | | | | 628 | 0.4 | ▼2.1 |
| AD-DEMOKRATEN | | | | | 529 | 0.4 | |
| FW | | | | | 371 | 0.3 | ▲0.1 |
| DiB | | | | | 269 | 0.2 | |
| NPD | | | | | 246 | 0.2 | ▼0.6 |
| V-Partei³ | | | | | 197 | 0.1 | |
| BGE | | | | | 181 | 0.1 | |
| DM | | | | | 180 | 0.1 | |
| Gesundheitsforschung | | | | | 145 | 0.1 | |
| ÖDP | | | | | 134 | 0.1 | 0.0 |
| Die Humanisten | | | | | 129 | 0.1 | |
| Volksabstimmung | | | | | 124 | 0.1 | ▼0.1 |
| MLPD | Dagmar Eberhard-Forschner | 295 | 0.2 | | 116 | 0.1 | 0.0 |
| DKP | | | | | 42 | 0.0 | |
| SGP | | | | | 9 | 0.0 | 0.0 |
| Informal votes | | 1,771 | | | 1,053 | | |
| Total valid votes | | 141,828 | | | 142,546 | | |
| Turnout | | 143,599 | 74.3 | ▲3.3 | | | |
| CDU hold | Majority | 9,223 | 6.5 | ▲0.8 | | | |

=== 2013 election ===
Federal election (2013): Düsseldorf II
| Notes: | Blue background denotes the winner of the electorate vote. Pink background denotes a candidate elected from their party list. Yellow background denotes an electorate win by a list member, or other incumbent. A ✓ or ✗ denotes status of any incumbent, win or lose respectively. | | | | | | |
| Party | Candidate | Votes | % | ±% | Party votes | % | ±% |
|---|---|---|---|---|---|---|---|
| CDU | Sylvia Pantel | 55,990 | 40.7 | ▲3.0 | 51,050 | 37.0 | ▲6.3 |
| SPD | Andreas Rimkus | 48,065 | 35.0 | ▲1.7 | 41,737 | 30.2 | ▲4.1 |
| Left | Sahra Wagenknecht | 12,538 | 9.1 | ▼0.6 | 10,705 | 7.8 | ▼2.2 |
| Greens | Uwe Marold Warnecke | 10,315 | 7.5 | ▼2.4 | 13,399 | 9.7 | ▼3.0 |
| FDP | Gerhard Hansen | 3,980 | 2.9 | ▼5.2 | 7,979 | 5.8 | ▼9.7 |
| AfD | | | | | 5,845 | 4.2 | |
| Pirates | Patrick Schiffer | 3,848 | 2.8 | | 3,509 | 2.5 | ▲0.7 |
| NPD | Andreas Büchner | 1,330 | 1.0 | ▼0.2 | 1,048 | 0.8 | ▲0.1 |
| PARTEI | | | | | 556 | 0.4 | |
| REP | Karl-Heinz Fischer | 961 | 0.7 | | 550 | 0.4 | ▼0.4 |
| PRO | | | | | 283 | 0.2 | |
| FW | | | | | 256 | 0.2 | |
| Volksabstimmung | | | | | 245 | 0.2 | ▲0.1 |
| Nichtwahler | | | | | 193 | 0.1 | |
| ÖDP | | | | | 188 | 0.1 | ▲0.1 |
| BIG | | | | | 154 | 0.1 | |
| Party of Reason | | | | | 85 | 0.1 | |
| BüSo | Tobias Faku | 380 | 0.3 | | 81 | 0.1 | 0.0 |
| RRP | | | | | 65 | 0.0 | ▼0.1 |
| MLPD | | | | | 61 | 0.0 | 0.0 |
| PSG | | | | | 35 | 0.0 | 0.0 |
| Die Rechte | | | | | 18 | 0.0 | |
| Informal votes | | 1,983 | | | 1,348 | | |
| Total valid votes | | 137,407 | | | 138,042 | | |
| Turnout | | 139,390 | 71.0 | ▲2.2 | | | |
| CDU hold | Majority | 7,925 | 5.7 | ▲1.3 | | | |

=== 2009 election ===
Federal election (2009): Düsseldorf II
| Notes: | Blue background denotes the winner of the electorate vote. Pink background denotes a candidate elected from their party list. Yellow background denotes an electorate win by a list member, or other incumbent. A ✓ or ✗ denotes status of any incumbent, win or lose respectively. | | | | | | |
| Party | Candidate | Votes | % | ±% | Party votes | % | ±% |
|---|---|---|---|---|---|---|---|
| CDU | Beatrix Philipp | 50,233 | 37.7 | ▼0.9 | 40,906 | 30.6 | ▼1.5 |
| SPD | ✗ Karin Kortmann | 44,295 | 33.3 | ▼12.7 | 34,873 | 26.1 | ▼12.6 |
| Greens | Holger-Michael Arndt | 13,137 | 9.9 | ▲4.7 | 16,897 | 12.7 | ▲3.1 |
| Left | Sahra Wagenknecht | 12,948 | 9.7 | ▲4.8 | 13,244 | 9.9 | ▲4.0 |
| FDP | Michael Dimitrov | 10,758 | 8.1 | ▲3.7 | 20,625 | 15.5 | ▲5.0 |
| Pirates | | | | | 2,499 | 1.9 | |
| REP | | | | | 1,002 | 0.8 | ▲0.3 |
| NPD | Andreas Büchner | 1,560 | 1.2 | ▲0.3 | 900 | 0.7 | ▲0.1 |
| Tierschutzpartei | | | | | 841 | 0.6 | ▲0.1 |
| FAMILIE | | | | | 511 | 0.4 | 0.0 |
| RENTNER | | | | | 495 | 0.4 | |
| RRP | | | | | 208 | 0.2 | |
| Volksabstimmung | | | | | 119 | 0.1 | 0.0 |
| ÖDP | | | | | 108 | 0.1 | |
| Centre | | | | | 89 | 0.1 | 0.0 |
| MLPD | Dagmar Eberhard-Forschner | 202 | 0.2 | | 64 | 0.0 | 0.0 |
| DVU | | | | | 63 | 0.0 | |
| BüSo | | | | | 28 | 0.0 | 0.0 |
| PSG | | | | | 23 | 0.0 | 0.0 |
| Informal votes | | 1,690 | | | 1,328 | | |
| Total valid votes | | 133,133 | | | 133,495 | | |
| Turnout | | 134,823 | 68.8 | ▼7.1 | | | |
| CDU gain from SPD | Majority | 5,938 | 4.4 | | | | |

=== 2005 election ===
Federal election (2005): Düsseldorf II
| Notes: | Blue background denotes the winner of the electorate vote. Pink background denotes a candidate elected from their party list. Yellow background denotes an electorate win by a list member, or other incumbent. A ✓ or ✗ denotes status of any incumbent, win or lose respectively. | | | | | | |
| Party | Candidate | Votes | % | ±% | Party votes | % | ±% |
|---|---|---|---|---|---|---|---|
| SPD | ✓ Karin Kortmann | 66,555 | 45.9 | ▼3.7 | 56,223 | 38.7 | ▼3.2 |
| CDU | Beatrix Philipp | 55,982 | 38.6 | ▲3.5 | 46,704 | 32.2 | 0.0 |
| Greens | Norbert Czerwinski | 7,483 | 5.2 | ▼0.48 | 13,902 | 9.6 | ▼2.2 |
| Left | Frank Laubenburg | 7,070 | 4.9 | ▲3.4 | 8,569 | 5.9 | ▲4.2 |
| FDP | Manfred Newhouse | 6,324 | 4.4 | ▼2.2 | 15,200 | 10.5 | ▲0.7 |
| NPD | Sven Spiwak | 1,215 | 0.8 | | 874 | 0.6 | ▲0.4 |
| GRAUEN | | | | | 1,170 | 0.8 | ▲0.5 |
| Tierschutzpartei | | | | | 741 | 0.5 | ▲0.1 |
| REP | | | | | 718 | 0.5 | ▲0.1 |
| Familie | | | | | 491 | 0.3 | ▲0.1 |
| Humanist | Karsten Winkler | 257 | 0.2 | ▲0.1 | | | |
| From Now on... Democracy Through Referendum | | | | | 146 | 0.1 | |
| PBC | | | | | 140 | 0.1 | |
| BüSo | | | | | 75 | 0.1 | |
| MLPD | | | | | 68 | 0.0 | |
| Centre | | | | | 46 | 0.0 | |
| Socialist Equality Party | | | | | 48 | 0.0 | 0.0 |
| Informal votes | | 1,881 | | | 1,652 | | |
| Total valid votes | | 144,886 | | | 145,115 | | |
| Turnout | | 146,767 | 75.9 | ▼2.4 | | | |
| SPD hold | Majority | 10,573 | 7.3 | | | | |
