= Sylvia Pantel =

German politician

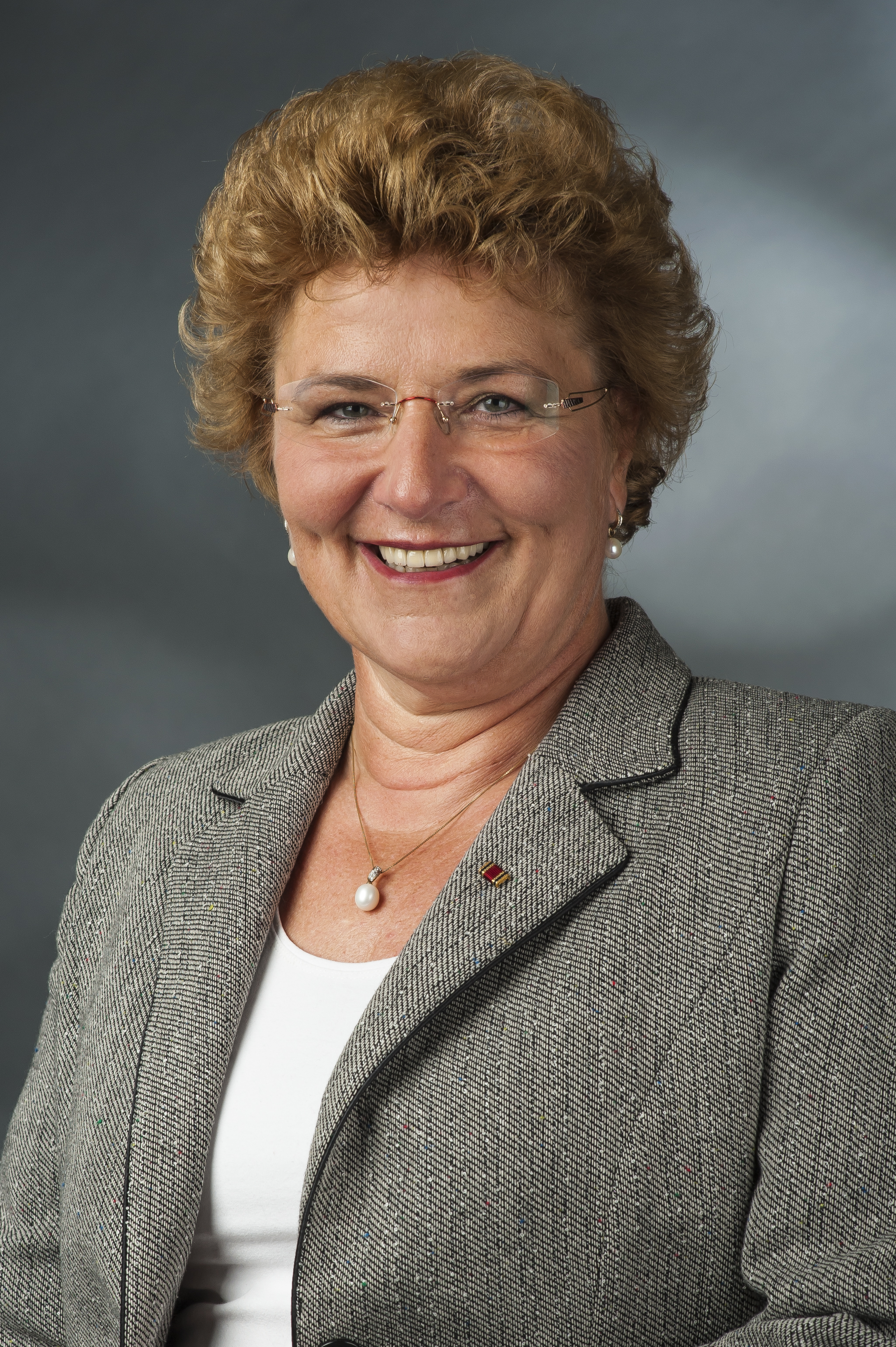
- Sylvia Pantel in 2014

Member of the Bundestag for Düsseldorf II
- In office 22 September 2013 – 2021
- Preceded by: Beatrix Philipp
- Succeeded by: Andreas Rimkus

Personal details
- Born: 1 January 1961 (age 65) Düsseldorf, West Germany (now Germany)
- Party: CDU

Sylvia Pantel (born 1 January 1961) is a German politician who was a member of the Bundestag from the state of North Rhine-Westphalia from 2013 to 2021. From 1996 to 2024, she was a member of the Christian Democratic Union (CDU).

== Political career ==
Pantel first became a member of the Bundestag in the 2013 German federal election, representing the Düsseldorf II district. In parliament, she was a member of the Committee on Families, Senior Citizens, Women and Youth.

Pantel lost her seat in the 2021 German federal election.

== Political positions ==
Ahead of the 2021 Christian Democratic Union of Germany leadership election, Pantel publicly endorsed Friedrich Merz to succeed Annegret Kramp-Karrenbauer as the party’s chair.

== See also ==
- List of members of the 18th Bundestag
- List of members of the 19th Bundestag
