= Stefan Gruhner =

German politician (born 1984)

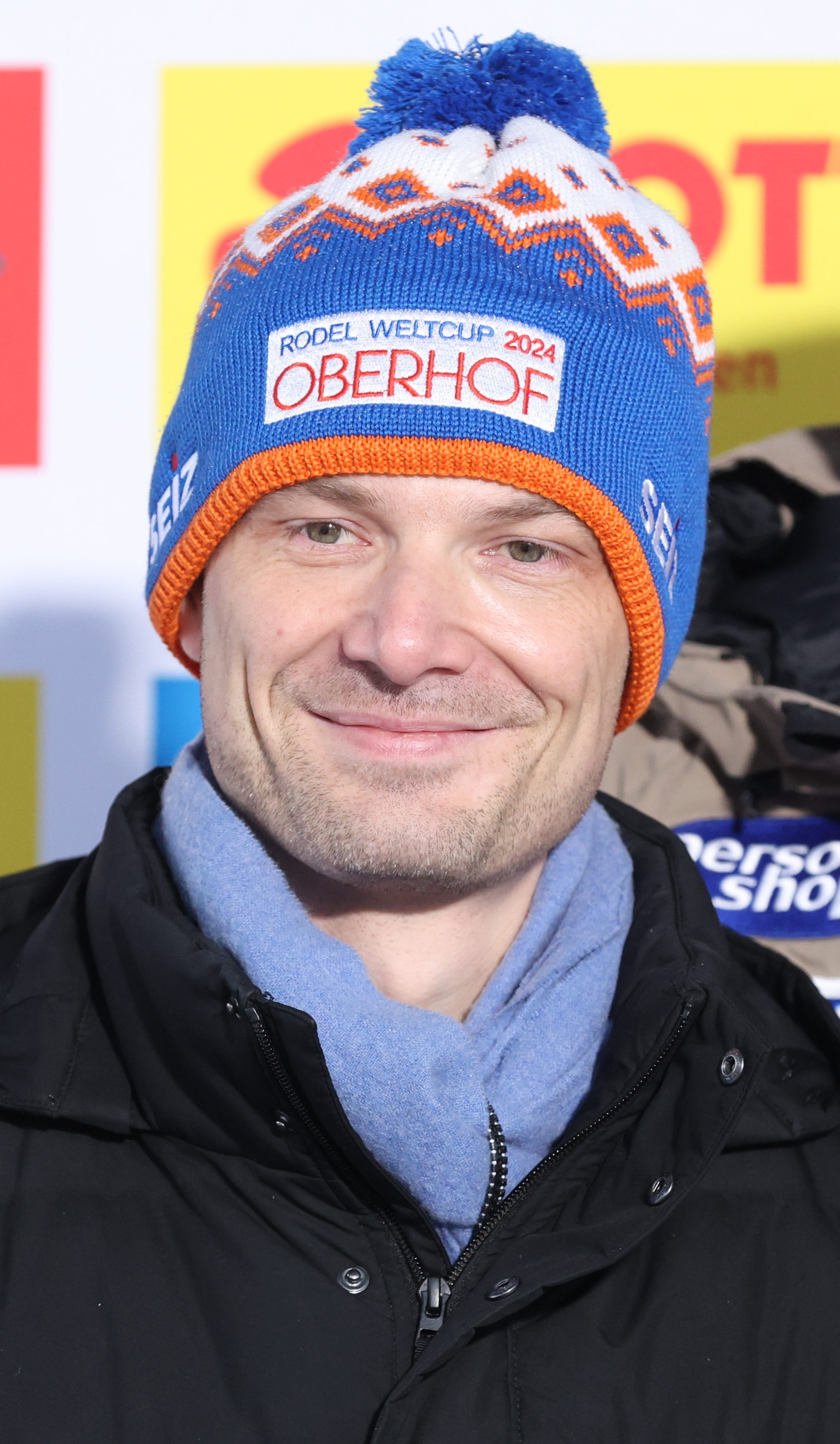
- Stefan Gruhner in 2024

Head of the State Chancellery of Thuringia
- Incumbent
- Assumed office 13 December 2024

Minister for Federal and European Affairs, Sports and Voluntary Work of Thuringia
- Incumbent
- Assumed office 13 December 2024

Member of the Landtag of Thuringia
- In office 2014–2019

Personal details
- Born: 23 October 1984 (age 41) Schleiz, Thuringia, Germany (then East Germany)
- Party: CDU
- Education: University of Jena

Stefan Gruhner (born 23 October 1984) is a German politician from the Christian Democratic Union of Germany. He was state chairman of the Young Union in the state of Thuringia from 2010 to 2019. From 2014 to 2019 he was a member of the Landtag of Thuringia. Since December 2024 he has been head of the state chancellery and Minister for Federal and European Affairs, Sport and Voluntary Work in the Voigt cabinet.

== Life and career ==
After graduating from the Dr. Konrad Duden Gymnasium in Schleiz in 2003, Gruhner completed his military service with the 722nd Pioneer Battalion in Gera from 2003 to 2004. He then began studying politics and history at the Friedrich Schiller University of Jena, which he completed with the state examination in 2010. During his studies, he joined the Burschenschaft Teutonia Jena fraternity. In addition, he completed a degree at the Quadriga Hochschule Berlin in 2016/17 and graduated with a Master of Business Administration (MBA).

From 2010 to 2013 he was a consultant for political issues at the CDU state association in Thuringia. From August 2013, until his election to the Thuringian state parliament, he was the personal advisor to Thuringian Prime Minister Christine Lieberknecht in the Thuringian State Chancellery. From January 2020 to 2022, Gruhner worked as head of the staff unit "Future of the People's Party/Federal-State Coordination/International Party Relations" in the federal office of the CDU. From 2022 to 2023 he was a Federal Council consultant at the Representation of the Free State of Thuringia to the Federal Government. From March 2023 to December 2024 he was parliamentary group manager of the CDU parliamentary group in the Thuringian state parliament.

== Political career ==
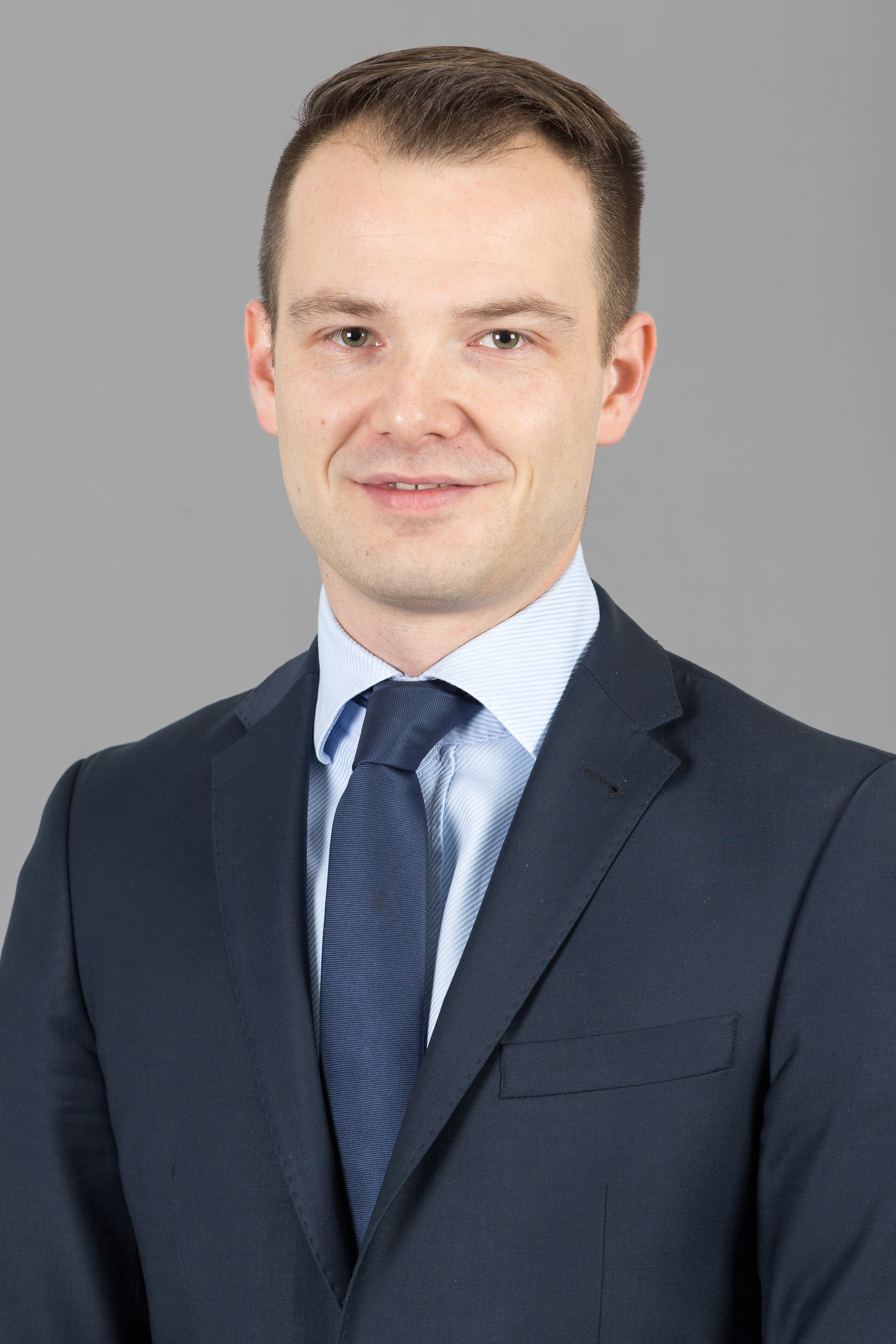
Stefan Gruhner in 2016

Gruhner joined the Junge Union in 1999 and the CDU in 2002. From 2006 to 2010 he was a member of the federal executive board of the Junge Union Deutschlands. He became CDU district chairman in the Saale-Orla-Kreis in 2009 and was state chairman of the Junge Union from 2010 to 2019.

Gruhner has been a member of the Saale-Orla district council since 2004. From 2009 to 2012, he chaired the district council committee for education, culture and sport; in 2012, he became chairman of the CDU parliamentary group. In the 2014 Thuringian state election, he won the direct mandate in the Saale-Orla-Kreis I constituency and was elected to the Landtag of Thuringia. From 2018 to 2019, he was chairman of the International Commission of the Young Union of Germany for Foreign, European and Security Policy.

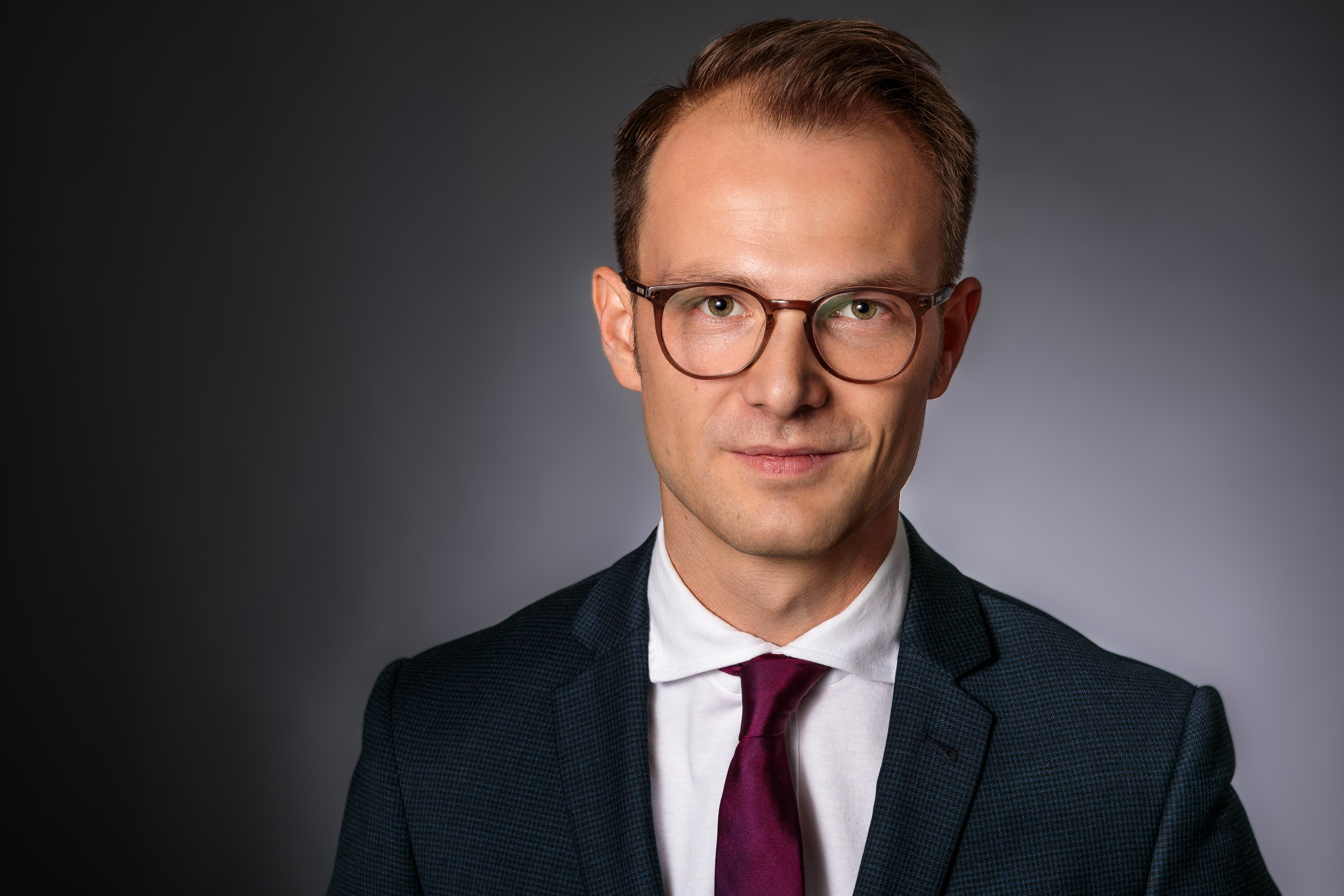
Stefan Gruhner in 2018

Since November 2018 he has been deputy chairman of the International Young Democrat Union. In January 2019 he announced his candidacy for the federal chairmanship of the Junge Union as successor to Paul Ziemiak. In the election at the extraordinary party congress on 16 March he was defeated by Tilman Kuban.

In the 2019 Thuringian state election, Gruhner lost the direct mandate in his constituency Saale-Orla-Kreis I to the AfD candidate Uwe Thrum; his party's state list was not considered due to the number of direct mandates.

Since December 2024 he has been head of the state chancellery and Minister for Federal and European Affairs, Sport and Voluntary Work in the Voigt cabinet.
