= Daniel Artmann =

German politician (born 1988)

Member of the Landtag of Bavaria
- Incumbent
- Assumed office 30 October 2023
- Preceded by: Klaus Stöttner
- Constituency: Rosenheim-Ost

Personal details
- Born: 16 August 1988 (age 37)
- Party: Christian Social Union (since 2002)

Daniel Artmann (born 16 August 1988) is a German politician serving as a member of the Landtag of Bavaria since 2023. He has served as chairman of the Christian Social Union in Rosenheim since 2015. From 2017 to 2021, he served as chairman of the Young Union in Upper Bavaria. From 2006 to 2007, he served as managing director of the Schüler Union in Bavaria.
