= Jan Löffler =

German politician (born 1981)

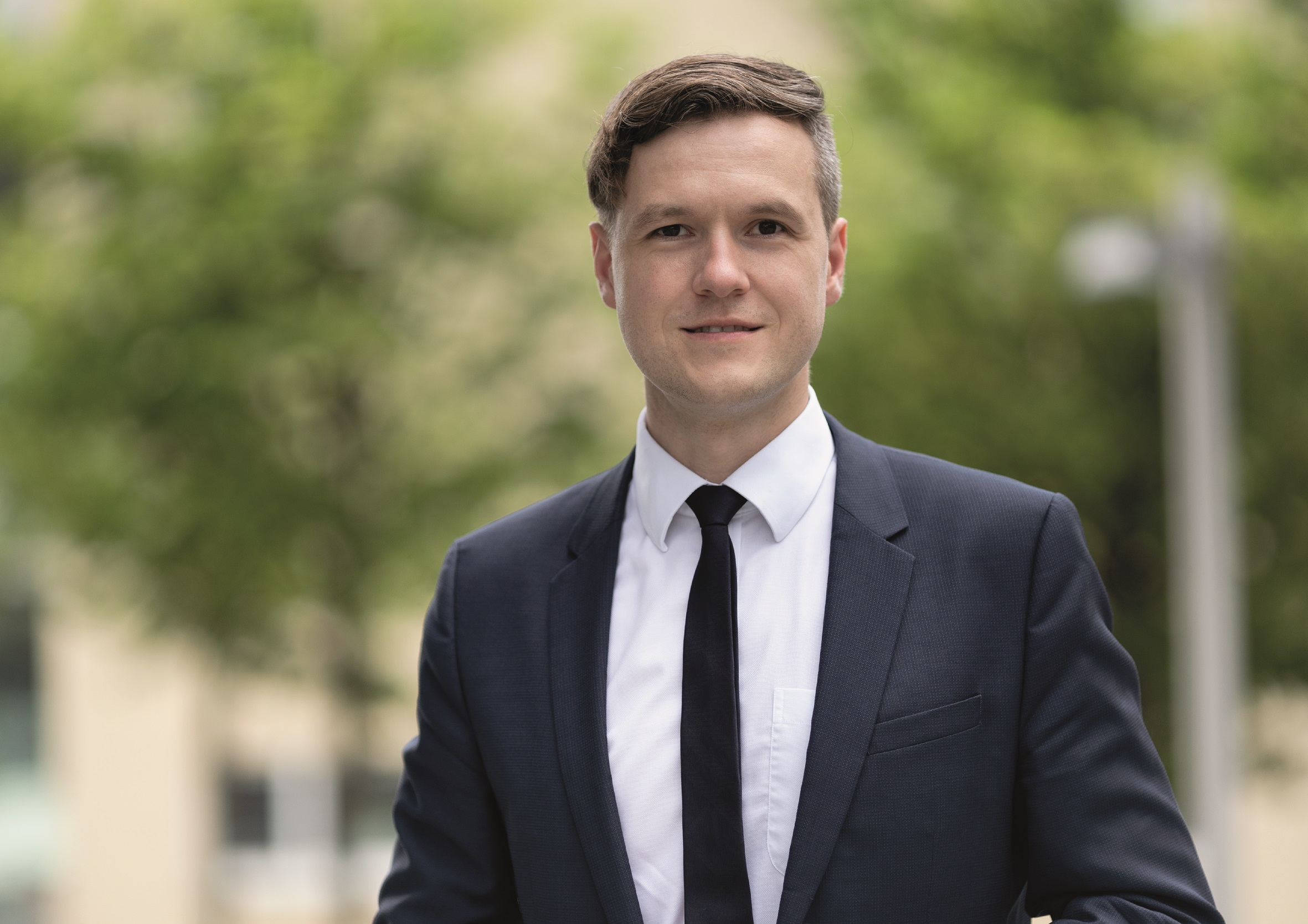
Loeffler in 2020

Jan Löffler (born 3 June 1981 in Werdau) is a German politician (CDU). Since 2009 he is a member of the Saxon Landtag. Currently he is the vice chairman and treasurer of the CDU-faction in the Saxon Landtag.

== Personal life ==
Jan Löffler grew up in Neukirchen/Pleiße. After his high-school diploma in 1998 and his university entrance qualification in economy and social studies, Löffler completed a vocational training as banker at Sparkasse Zwickau. He has been working as bank accountant for private customers since. Between 2004 and 2007 Jan Löffler completed an advanced training in business administration at the Sächsische Verwaltungs- und Wirtschafts-Akademie (VWA) in Dresden. In 2017 Jan Löffler graduated from Chemnitz University of Technology with a bachelor's degree in Management.

== Political career ==
Jan Löffler was a member of the Young Union of Germany (JU) between 2005 and 2016. He joined the CDU in 2005 and became chairman of the CDU in Neukirchen/Pleiße and member of the board of the CDU in Zwickau in 2006. In 2008 Löffler got firstly elected the treasurer of the CDU Zwickau and remained in office since then. Furthermore, he got elected as member of the town council of Neukirchen/Pleiße and deputy major of his town in 2009.

In the 2009 elections for the Parliament of Saxony Jan Löffler obtained a direct mandate for the constituency of Zwickauer Land 2.

He became a member of the board of the CDU parliamentary group in the Parliament of Saxony in 2012.

In the 2014 elections for the Parliament of Saxony Löffler defended his direct mandate in the constituency Zwickau 2 with an electoral vote of 44.6%. In this legislature he was a member of the Committee on Internal Affairs, the committee on financial affairs and the committee on the “NSU” terrorist organization in Saxony. As active fireman he also acts as spokesman on fire and civil protection of the CDU in the Parliament of Saxony.

On 2012, he was a member of the Federal Assembly.

2019 he defended again his direct mandate in Zwickau 2 with an electoral vote of 39,1%. Currently he is a member of the committee of regional development and in the committee on financial affairs.
