= Manuel Knoll (politician) =

German politician (born 1990)

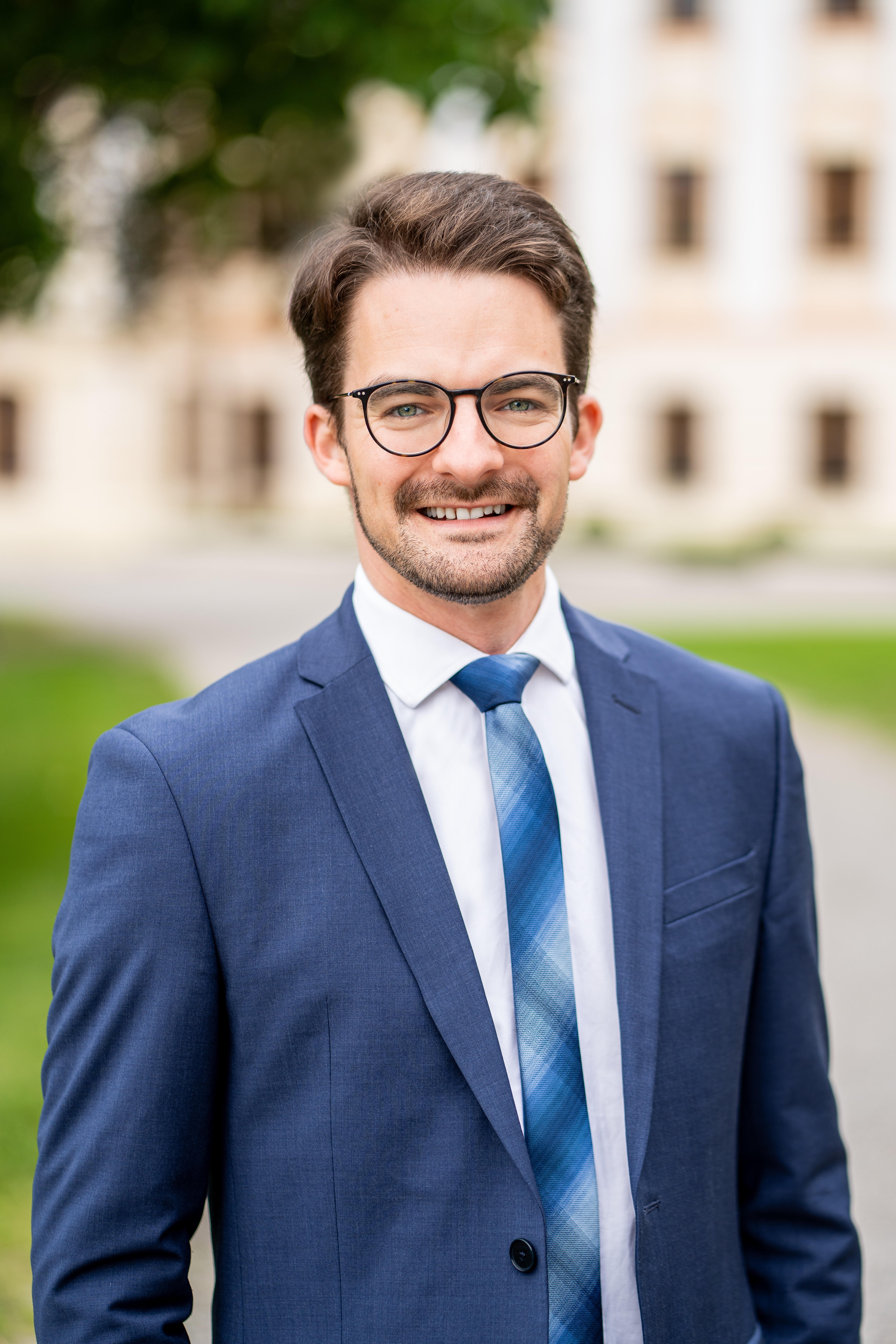
- Knoll in 2023

Member of the Landtag of Bavaria
- Incumbent
- Assumed office 30 October 2023
- Preceded by: Georg Winter
- Constituency: Augsburg-Land, Dillingen

Personal details
- Born: 7 August 1990 (age 36) Höchstädt an der Donau
- Party: Christian Social Union

Manuel Knoll (born 7 August 1990 in Höchstädt an der Donau) is a German politician serving as a member of the Landtag of Bavaria since 2023. He has served as chairman of the Young Union in Bavaria since 2025.
