= Committee on European Affairs =

Committee on European Affairs may refer to:

- Committee on European Affairs (Bulgaria)
- Committee on European Affairs (France)
