= Saale-Orla-Kreis I =

Electoral constituency in Thuringia, Germany

Saale-Orla-Kreis I is an electoral constituency (German: Wahlkreis) represented in the Landtag of Thuringia. It elects one member via first-past-the-post voting. Under the current constituency numbering system, it is designated as constituency 33. It covers the southern part of Saale-Orla-Kreis.

Saale-Orla-Kreis I was created for the 1994 state election. Since 2019, it has been represented by Uwe Thrum of Alternative for Germany (AfD).

== Geography ==
As of the 2019 state election, Saale-Orla-Kreis I covers the southern part of Saale-Orla-Kreis, specifically the municipalities of Bad Lobenstein, Burgk, Dittersdorf, Dreba, Gefell, Görkwitz, Göschitz, Hirschberg, Kirschkau, Knau, Löhma, Moßbach, Neundorf (at Schleiz), Oettersdorf, Plothen, Pörmitz, Remptendorf, Rosenthal am Rennsteig, Saalburg-Ebersdorf, Schleiz (excluding Crispendorf), Tanna, Tegau, Volkmannsdorf, and Wurzbach.

== Members ==
The constituency was held by the Christian Democratic Union (CDU) from its creation in 1994 until 2019, during which time it was represented by Siegfried Wetzel (1994–2014) and Stefan Gruhner (2014–2019). It was won by Alternative for Germany in 2019, and is represented by Uwe Thrum.

Election	Member	Party	%
1994	Siegfried Wetzel	CDU	44.7
1999	Siegfried Wetzel	CDU	48.7
2004	Siegfried Wetzel	CDU	38.0
2009	Siegfried Wetzel	CDU	28.9
2014	Stefan Gruhner	CDU	42.1
2019	Uwe Thrum	AfD	29.0
2024	Uwe Thrum	AfD	40.7

== Election results ==
=== 2024 election ===
State election (2024): Saale-Orla-Kreis I
Notes:	Blue background denotes the winner of the electorate vote. Pink background denotes a candidate elected from their party list. Yellow background denotes an electorate win by a list member, or other incumbent. A ✓ or ✗ denotes status of any incumbent, win or lose respectively.						
Party	Candidate	Votes	%	±%	Party votes	%	±%
AfD	✓ Uwe Thrum	11,391	47.4	▲18.4	9,826	40.7	▲13.5
CDU	Katrin Gerdorf	7,953	33.1	▲4.9	5,562	23.0	▲0.7
BSW					3,731	15.4	
Left	Ralf Kalich	3,026	12.6	▼12.5	2,898	12.0	▼19.9
UBV	Lennart Scheffczyk	853	3.6				
SPD	Moritz Kalthoff	793	3.3	▼3.6	735	3.0	▼3.4
Greens					281	1.2	▼1.2
FW					255	1.1	
FDP					243	1.0	▼4.0
APT					200	0.8	▼0.1
Familie					117	0.5	
Values					110	0.5	
BD					92	0.4	
Pirates					57	0.2	▼0.2
ÖDP					38	0.2	▼0.2
MLPD					26	0.1	▼0.2
Informal votes		329			174		
Total valid votes		24,016			24,171		
Turnout		24,345	76.7	▲8.8			
AfD hold	Majority	3,438	14.3	▲13.5			

=== 2019 election ===
State election (2019): Saale-Orla-Kreis I
Notes:	Blue background denotes the winner of the electorate vote. Pink background denotes a candidate elected from their party list. Yellow background denotes an electorate win by a list member, or other incumbent. A ✓ or ✗ denotes status of any incumbent, win or lose respectively.						
Party	Candidate	Votes	%	±%	Party votes	%	±%
AfD	Uwe Thrum	6,643	29.0		6,235	27.2	▲15.1
CDU	✗ Stefan Gruhner	6,452	28.2	▼13.9	5,116	22.3	▼15.3
Left	Ralf Kalich	5,755	25.1	▼6.7	7,328	31.9	▲3.3
SPD	Werner Christel	1,575	6.9	▼4.8	1,473	6.4	▼4.0
FDP	Felix Schaum	1,035	4.5	▼0.4	1,158	5.0	▲2.6
Free Voters	Christian Meyer	731	3.2				
Greens	Sabine Reichmann	659	2.9	▼2.1	542	2.4	▼1.0
MLPD	Johannes Rupprecht	37	0.2		52	0.2	
List-only parties					1,052	4.6	
Informal votes		286			217		
Total valid votes		22,887			22,956		
Turnout		23,173	67.9	▲11.5			
AfD gain from CDU	Majority	191	0.8				

=== 2014 election ===
State election (2014): Saale-Orla-Kreis I
Notes:	Blue background denotes the winner of the electorate vote. Pink background denotes a candidate elected from their party list. Yellow background denotes an electorate win by a list member, or other incumbent. A ✓ or ✗ denotes status of any incumbent, win or lose respectively.						
Party	Candidate	Votes	%	±%	Party votes	%	±%
CDU	Stefan Gruhner	8,410	42.1	▲13.2	7,604	37.6	▲4.6
Left	Ralf Kalich	6,345	31.8	▲5.2	5,778	28.6	▲0.3
AfD					2,446	12.1	
SPD	Kai Vöcking	2,338	11.7	▼10.2	2,110	10.4	▼8.6
Greens	Janina Geiler	997	5.0		689	3.4	▼0.1
FDP	Sandra Scherf-Michel	981	4.9	▼1.9	479	2.4	▼4.8
NPD	Danny Ptotenhauer	903	4.5	▲0.6	580	2.9	▼1.2
List-only parties					525	2.6	
Informal votes		429			192		
Total valid votes		19,974			20,211		
Turnout		20,403	56.4	▼1.2			
CDU hold	Majority	2,065	10.3	▲8.0			

=== 2009 election ===
State election (2009): Saale-Orla-Kreis I
Notes:	Blue background denotes the winner of the electorate vote. Pink background denotes a candidate elected from their party list. Yellow background denotes an electorate win by a list member, or other incumbent. A ✓ or ✗ denotes status of any incumbent, win or lose respectively.						
Party	Candidate	Votes	%	±%	Party votes	%	±%
CDU	✓ Siegfried Wetzel	6,344	28.9	▼9.1	7,264	33.0	▼12.9
Left	Ralf Kalich	5,843	26.6	▲1.0	6,238	28.3	▲2.8
SPD	Rüdiger Wohl	4,820	21.9	▲5.5	4,182	19.0	▲4.8
Independent	Andreas Scheffczyk	2,599	11.8	▼3.6			
FDP	Frank Stephan Bergner	1,495	6.8	▲2.2	1,578	7.2	▲3.2
NPD	Udo Illig	865	3.9		902	4.1	▲2.8
Greens					776	3.5	▲0.7
List-only parties					1,086	4.9	
Informal votes		458			398		
Total valid votes		21,966			22,026		
Turnout		22,424	57.6	▲2.6			
CDU hold	Majority	501	2.3	▼10.1			

=== 2004 election ===
State election (2004): Saale-Orla-Kreis I
Notes:	Blue background denotes the winner of the electorate vote. Pink background denotes a candidate elected from their party list. Yellow background denotes an electorate win by a list member, or other incumbent. A ✓ or ✗ denotes status of any incumbent, win or lose respectively.						
Party	Candidate	Votes	%	±%	Party votes	%	±%
CDU	✓ Siegfried Wetzel	8,084	38.0	▼10.7	9,781	45.9	▼4.6
PDS	Klaus Möller	5,449	25.6	▲4.3	5,437	25.5	▲4.9
SPD	Stefan Fricke	3,497	16.4	▼3.7	3,027	14.2	▼3.5
Independent	Andreas Scheffczyk	3,283	15.4				
FDP	Thomas Witt	971	4.6		842	4.0	▲2.8
List-only parties					2,222	10.4	
Informal votes		914			889		
Total valid votes		21,284			21,309		
Turnout		22,198	55.0	▼5.6			
CDU hold	Majority	2,635	12.4	▼15.0			

=== 1999 election ===
State election (1999): Saale-Orla-Kreis I
Notes:	Blue background denotes the winner of the electorate vote. Pink background denotes a candidate elected from their party list. Yellow background denotes an electorate win by a list member, or other incumbent. A ✓ or ✗ denotes status of any incumbent, win or lose respectively.						
Party	Candidate	Votes	%	±%	Party votes	%	±%
CDU	✓ Siegfried Wetzel	11,867	48.7	▲4.0	12,384	50.5	▲5.4
PDS	Hannelore Fleischmann	5,189	21.3	▲7.1	5,048	20.6	▲5.0
SPD	Wolfgang Linke	4,889	20.1	▼6.0	4,350	17.7	▼10.2
VIBT	Andreas Scheffczyk	1,761	7.2		727	3.0	
REP	Manfred Annemüller	658	2.7	▲0.9	307	1.3	▼0.5
List-only parties					1,720	7.0	
Informal votes		404			232		
Total valid votes		24,364			24,536		
Turnout		24,768	60.6	▼16.0			
CDU hold	Majority	6,678	27.4	▲8.8			

=== 1994 election ===
State election (1994): Saale-Orla-Kreis I
Notes:	Blue background denotes the winner of the electorate vote. Pink background denotes a candidate elected from their party list. Yellow background denotes an electorate win by a list member, or other incumbent. A ✓ or ✗ denotes status of any incumbent, win or lose respectively.						
Party	Candidate	Votes	%	±%	Party votes	%	±%
CDU	Siegfried Wetzel	13,712	44.7		13,928	45.1	
SPD		7,998	26.1		8,614	27.9	
PDS		4,366	14.2		4,819	15.6	
FDP		1,612	5.3		1,079	3.5	
New Forum		1,365	4.5		364	1.2	
Greens		1,076	3.5		1,170	3.8	
REP		539	1.8		547	1.8	
List-only parties					351	1.1	
Informal votes		790			586		
Total valid votes		30,668			30,872		
Turnout		31,458	76.6				
CDU win new seat	Majority	5,714	18.6				
