= Tilman Kuban =

German politician

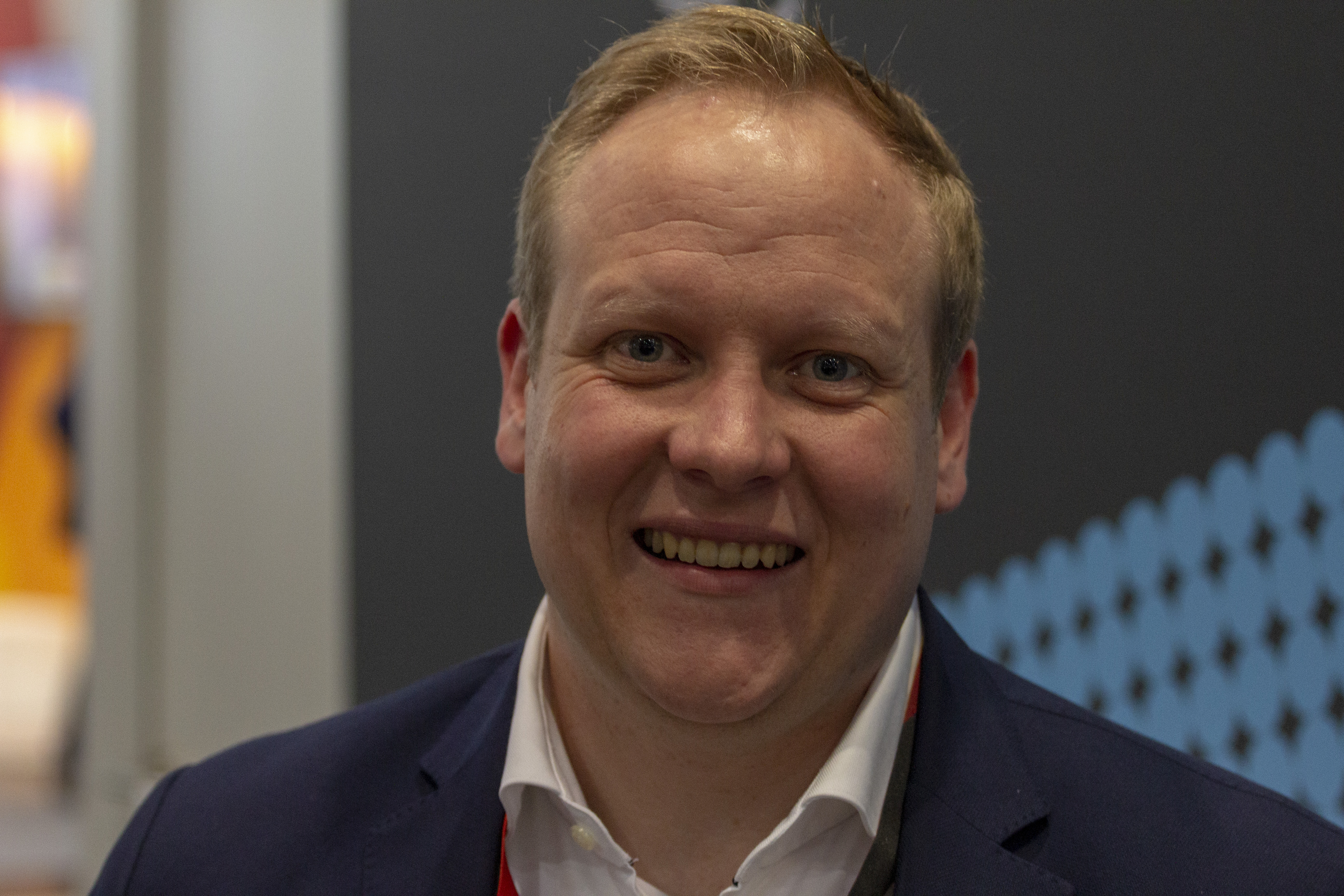
- Kuban in 2019

Member of the Bundestag
- Incumbent
- Assumed office 2021

Leader of the Young Union
- In office 16 March 2019 – 19 November 2022
- Preceded by: Paul Ziemiak
- Succeeded by: Johannes Winkel

Personal details
- Born: 26 May 1987 (age 38) Langenhagen, West Germany
- Party: Christian Democratic Union
- Education: University of Osnabrück

Tilman Moritz Kuban (born 26 May 1987) is a German politician of the Christian Democratic Union (CDU) who has been serving as a member of the German Bundestag since 2021. He was also the chairman of the CDU’s youth organisation, the Young Union (JU), from 2019 until 2022.

== Early life and education ==
Kuban was born 1987 in the West German town of Langenhagen and studied law at the University of Osnabrück. Before entering politics, he worked as a talent scout for football club Hannover 96.

== Political career ==
Kuban entered the CDU in 2007 and was elected chairman of the JU in 2019, succeeding Paul Ziemiak.

In November 2016, Kuban announced that he would succeed Maria Flachsbarth and run for a parliamentary seat in the 2021 national elections, representing the Hannover-Land II district. In parliament, Kuban has since been serving on the Committee on Economic Affairs and the Committee on European Affairs. In this capacity, he is his parliamentary group’s rapporteur on Europe’s relations with Ukraine.

== Political positions ==
In 2020, Kuban declared that the CDU was “resolved to not work together with the AfD or The Left, whether directly or indirectly."

Ahead of the Christian Democrats’ leadership election in 2021, Kuban publicly endorsed Friedrich Merz to succeed Annegret Kramp-Karrenbauer as the party's chair. For the 2021 national elections, he later endorsed Markus Söder as the Christian Democrats' joint candidate to succeed Chancellor Angela Merkel.
