= Monika Panayotova =

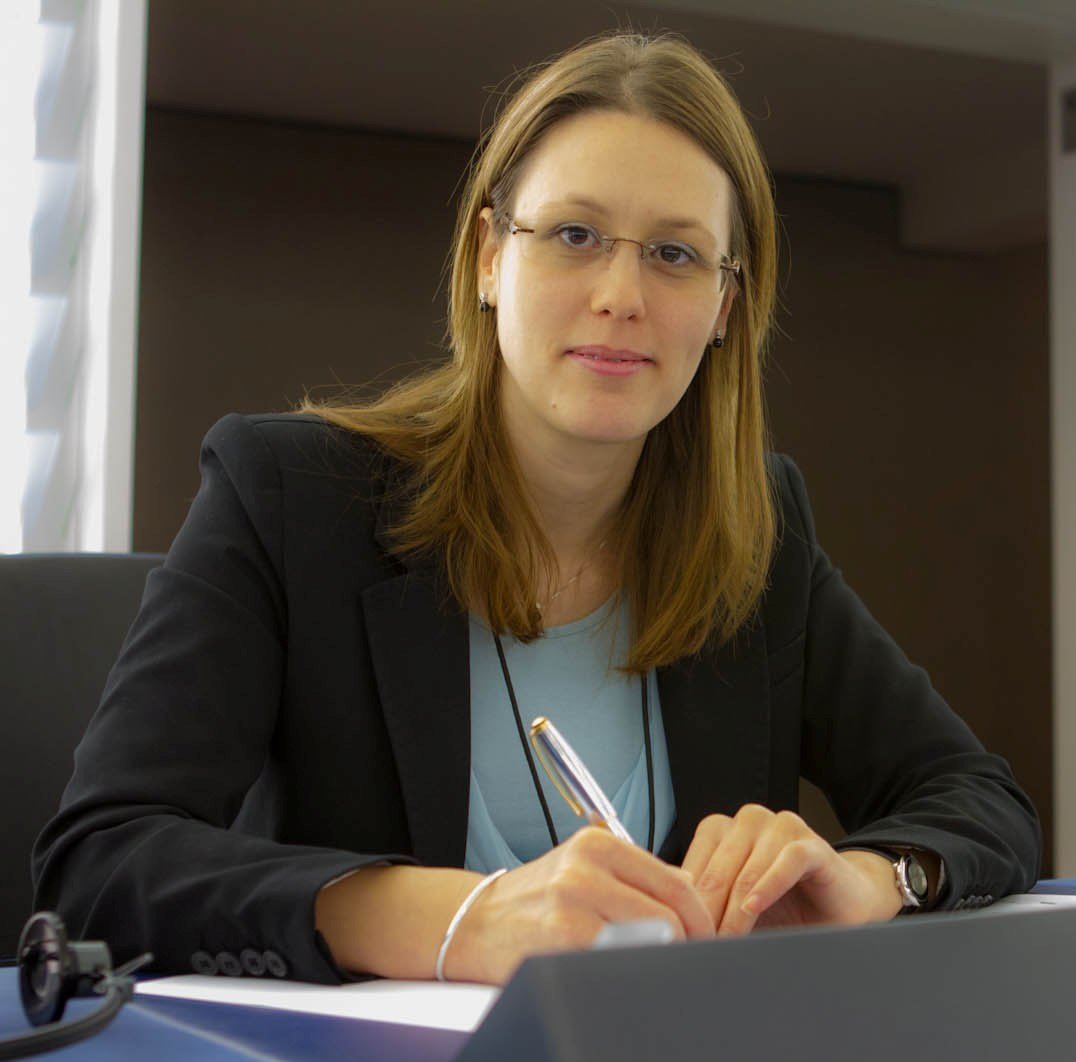
- Born: 19 August 1983 (age 42); Sofia, Bulgaria
- Occupations: Bulgarian politician and public figure
- Title: Deputy Minister for the Bulgarian Presidency of the Council of the EU 2018 (since June 28, 2017) Member of XLI National Assembly of the Republic of Bulgaria; Former Member of the European Parliament; Board Member of Sofia Security Forum (September, 2014 – June, 2017); Member of the Advisory Council of Bulgarian Memory Foundation (September, 2017 – June, 2017) Co-initiator and Board member of the Global Entrepreneurship Monitor for Bulgaria (January, 2015-February, 2017)

Monika Panayotova (Bulgarian: Моника Панайотова) is a Doctor of Political Science, with interests in the field of the EU security and defence policy. Bulgarian politician – Monika Panayotova has been appointed as Deputy Minister for the Bulgarian Presidency of the Council of the EU 2018, responsible for the relations with the European Parliament during the Bulgaria's presidency (the so-called - Ministre Délégué) since June 28, 2017.

In the period 2009–2012, Monika Panayotova was member of 41st National Assembly of the Republic of Bulgaria, chairwoman of Committee on European Affairs and Oversight of the European Funds and member of the Foreign Policy and Defence Committee.

During the period 2012 – 2014, she was a member of the European Parliament and participated in the Committee on Budgetary Control, the Committee on Culture and Education and the Subcommittee on Security and Defence.

Public figure – from 2014 to June 2017, she was General Manager of Inno Advisers Ltd, a consultancy company, owned by Comac Medical Ltd., with main purpose – the development of innovative projects and concepts in the field of education, health and science. In that period Monika Panayotova was as well member of the advisory council of Bulgarian Memory Foundation, Board member of Sofia Security Forum and co-initiator and board member of the Global Entrepreneurship Monitor for Bulgaria. In 2016, she was independent expert, Member of Horizon 2020 Advisory Group on "Spreading Excellence and Widening participation", European Commission.

In the period 2006 – 2008, she was director of “Projects and Public Communications” and research fellow at Economic Policy Institute in Bulgaria.

Monika Panayotova has publications on security and defence, NATO, European affairs and Common European security and Defence Policy.

== Education ==
Monika Panayotova is a Doctor of Political Science with defended PhD dissertation on the topic: EU Security and Defence after the Lisbon Treaty and NATO's New Concept. She has master's degree in International Economic Relations with specialisation on “Management of International Projects” as well as bachelor's degree in International Relations, from the University of National and World Economy, Sofia, Bulgaria.

She has also Executive education experience in the field of foreign and international affairs – Public Leaders in Southeast Europe program, Harvard University, JFK School of Government; Tailored Seminar on National Security Policy for Representatives from the Republic of Bulgaria, George C. Marshall European Center for Security Studies; Visitor Leadership Programs in US, France and NATO HQ Brussels; Bulgarian School of Politics “Dimitry Panitza”.

== Political career ==
Since June 28, 2017, Monika Panayotova has been appointed as Deputy Minister for the Bulgarian Presidency of the Council of the EU 2018, responsible for the relations with the European Parliament during the Bulgaria's presidency (the so-called – Ministre Délégué).

Monika Panayotova was member of Citizens for European Development of Bulgaria, a NGO that in 2016 was transformed to the Political party GERB. In 2008, she was elected for two consecutive mandates as a Chairwoman of the Youth organization of GERB until her resignation in 2014.

During the Bulgarian parliamentary elections in 2009, she was elected for Member of 41st National Assembly of the Republic of Bulgaria as a majoritarian candidate from 24th district of Sofia. The same year she was as well a candidate for Member of European Parliament.

At the 41st National Assembly, Monika Panayotova was Chairwoman of the Committee on European Affairs and Oversight of the European Funds (CEAOEF), member of the Foreign Policy and Defence Committee and Deputy Head of the Delegation to the Inter-Parliamentary Union; Chairperson of friendship group Bulgaria – Belgium; Member of the friendship groups with USA, France, Canada, Austria and Kosovo.

From 2012 to 2014 she was Member of European Parliament and she participated in the Committee on Budgetary Control, the Committee on Culture and Education and the Subcommittee on Security and Defence.

She worked actively with and for young people with a focus on their educational development and realisation on the labour market. As a Chairwoman of Committee on European Affairs and Oversight of the European Funds and then as MEP she worked in close cooperation with the NGO sector, academic circles and representatives of the entrepreneurial ecosystem.

With her team, she worked on the Bulgarian accession to the Schengen Area, better cooperation with Western Balkans countries and the adaptation of the National parliament to its new prerogatives according to the Lisbon Treaty, participating actively in political dialogue and interparliamentary meetings with the European Parliament. She initiated discussions on important European issues in Bulgaria.

As Chairwoman of CEAOEF, she contributed to the active participation of the Bulgarian National parliament in the political dialogue with institutions of the EU regarding issues of the EU political agenda and exercise its new prerogatives according to the Lisbon Treaty. She participated in COSAC/COFAC/CODAC meetings and exercised parliamentary and public diplomacy on Schengen, CVM mechanism, reform of defence sector as well as on oversight of European funding absorption. The main priorities were related to transposition of the EU legislation, the examination of draft legislative proposals of the EU and of the oversight of the spending of the European funds in Bulgaria.

As Member of the Foreign Policy and Defence Committee, she participated in the debates at Plenary and in the drafting of strategic documents in the field of national security, Bulgarian EuroAtlantic further integration and European defence policy.

As Member of European Parliament, she was Reporter on the Working document “Has the Commission ensured efficient implementation of the 7th Framework Programme for Research?’(Discharge 2012) where the MEP underlines in the context of Horizon 2020“

Active participation in SEDE and plenary on the need of strategic rethink of the security environment, followed by a change in the existing EU and NATO strategic documents in the field:

A shadow rapporteur on tackling youth unemployment: possible ways out.

Active work as well on different initiatives related to the opportunities for entrepreneurship, SMEs, access to new technologies, know-how and forms of risk capital, which are crucial for the Europe's positioning in the global competition.

She proposed that the European Commission designate 2017 as a European Year of Entrepreneurship. This call was later incorporated into a European Parliament resolution on creating a favourable environment for enterprises and start-ups to create jobs.

== Initiatives ==
1. In the capacity of Chairwoman of CEAOEF at the 41st National Assembly, Monika Panayotova realized different initiatives:

- Political dialogue with the European institutions, regular participation in the Conference of Parliamentary Committees for Union Affairs of Parliaments of the European Union (COSAC) and organisation of regular visits of European Commissioners in order to present to the National Assembly the Working programme of EC. In parallel the Ambassadors of the “Trio Presidency” were also invited to inform the MPs about the priorities of the respective Presidencies of the Council of the EU.
- Initiation of numerous events and projects on EU affairs which to be closer to the citizens: setting up of a “European corner” within the National Assembly giving the opportunity of visitors groups, MPs and journalists to have access to different information materials about EU, further development of “Council for public consultation” which supported the CEAOEF’ activities, as well as the participation of the MPs, members of the committee in numerous parliamentary statements, seminars and conferences. Initiation of the “European talks in the Parliament” forum A forum devoted to providing publicity and triggering discussions of the most emblematic events and processes from the European agenda. Using the public debates with the participation of European commissioners, MEPs, public opinion leaders, journalists and famous analysts, the Committee aimed to extend the direct contact between the civil society, the private sector and the academic circles regarding the strategic issues related to Europe's development. The events took place at the plenary hall of the National Assembly and were broadcast live on the webpage of the Parliament.

2. In the capacity of MP and MEP – Participation in the initiation and adoption process of Youth law in Bulgaria, starting a company with “one Euro”, active participation in the political dialogue with institutions of the EU regarding issues of the EU political agenda and exercised its new prerogatives according to the Lisbon Treaty, protection of interests of Bulgarian workers, students and scientists in Europe, promotion of youth volunteering, youth entrepreneurship and employment measures as well as initiation of proposal for European year of entrepreneurship.

== Publications ==
- Panayotova, M. “EU Security and Defence after the Lisbon Treaty and NATO's Strategic Concept of 2010”, Monograph, Economic Policy Institute, 2017
- Common Security and Defence Policy (Monika Panayotova). Bulletin December 2016 Panayotova, M. “It is time for strategic rethinking”. European view, 2014
- NATO and EU in the context of Energy security and Global commons. “Knowledge society”, 2015
