= Johannes Winkel =

German politician (born 1991)

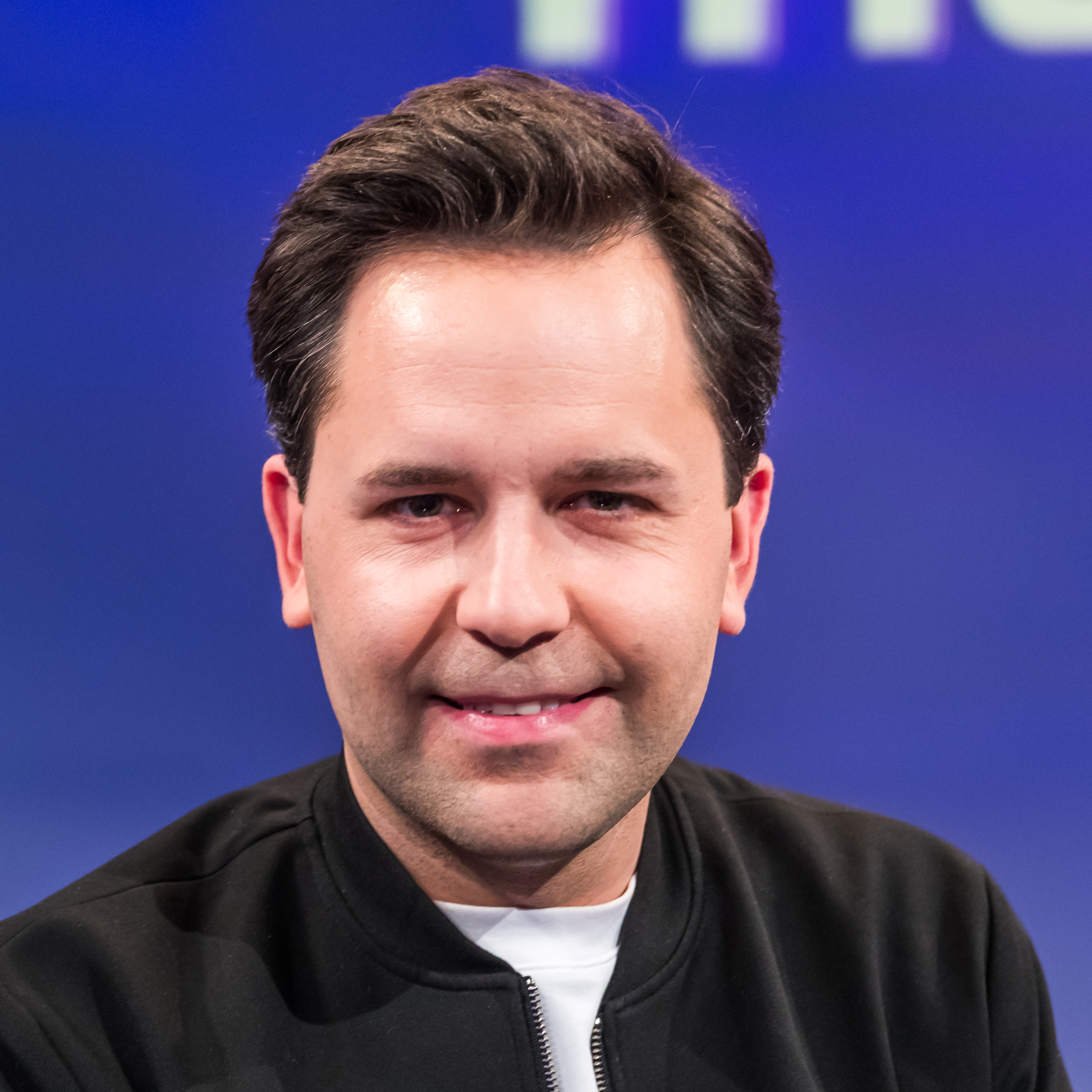
- Winkel in 2026

Member of the Bundestag
- Incumbent
- Assumed office 23 March 2025
- Constituency: Düsseldorf II

Leader of the Young Union
- Incumbent
- Assumed office 19 November 2022
- Preceded by: Tilman Kuban

Personal details
- Born: 28 October 1991 (age 34) Kreuztal, North Rhine-Westphalia, Germany
- Party: Christian Democratic Union
- Education: LMU Munich; University of St. Gallen; University of Bonn

Johannes Winkel (born 28 October 1991) is a German lawyer and politician of the Christian Democratic Union (CDU) who has been serving as a member of the Bundestag since 2025, representing the Düsseldorf II district. He has served as chairman of the Young Union since 2022.

== Political career ==
In the negotiations to form a Grand Coalition under the leadership of Friedrich Merz's Christian Democrats (CDU together with the Bavarian CSU) and the Social Democratic Party (SPD) following the 2025 German elections, Winkel was part of the CDU/CSU delegation in the working group on education, research and innovation, led by Karin Prien, Katrin Staffler and Oliver Kaczmarek.
