= Uwe Thrum =

German politician (born 1974)

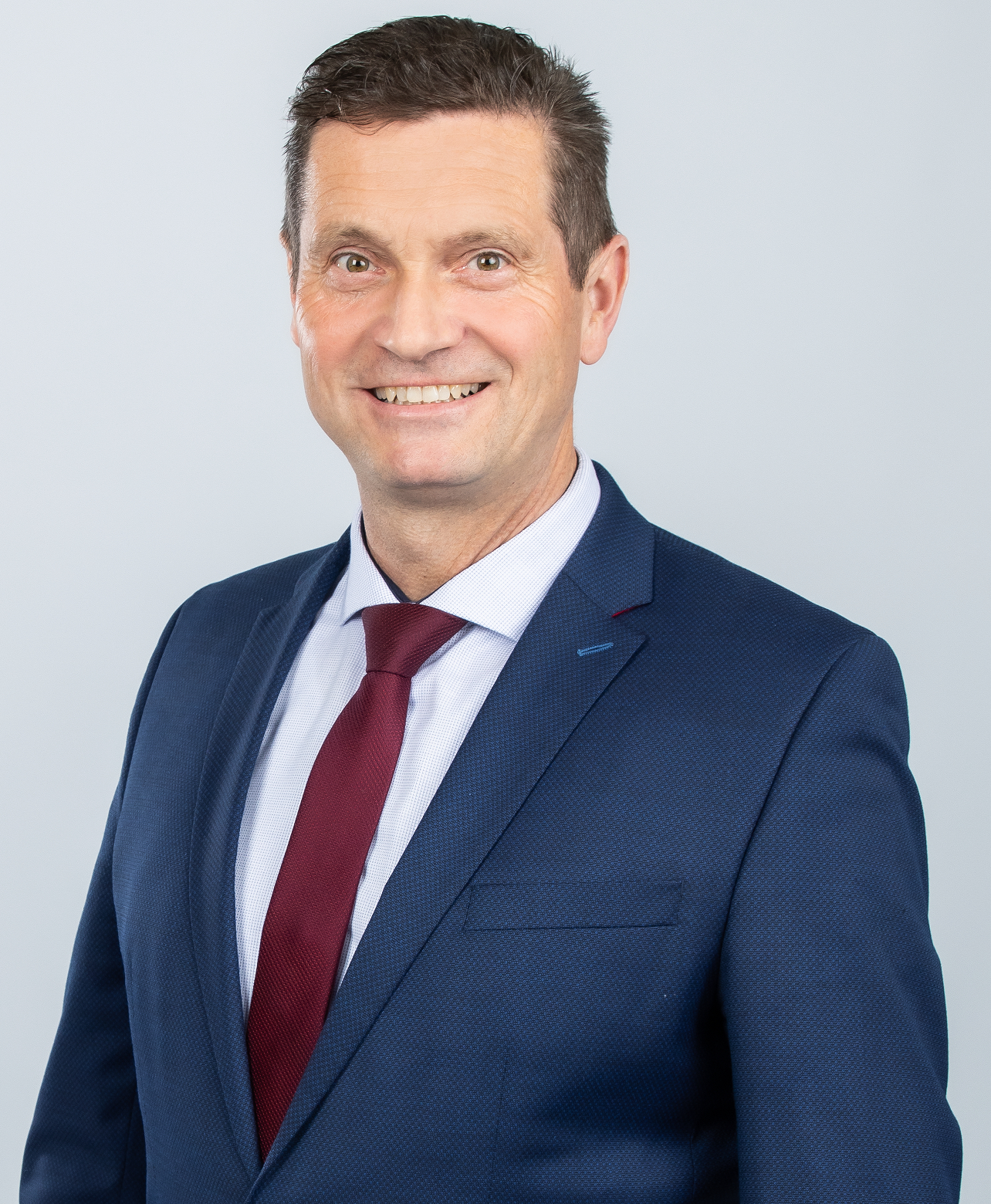
- Thrum in 2024

Member of the Landtag of Thuringia
- Incumbent
- Assumed office 26 November 2019
- Preceded by: Stefan Gruhner
- Constituency: Saale-Orla-Kreis I

Personal details
- Born: 10 November 1974 (age 51)
- Party: Alternative for Germany

Uwe Thrum (born 10 November 1974) is a German politician serving as a member of the Landtag of Thuringia since 2019. He is the chairman of the Alternative for Germany in Saale-Orla.
