= Johannes Caspers =

German politician (1910–1986)

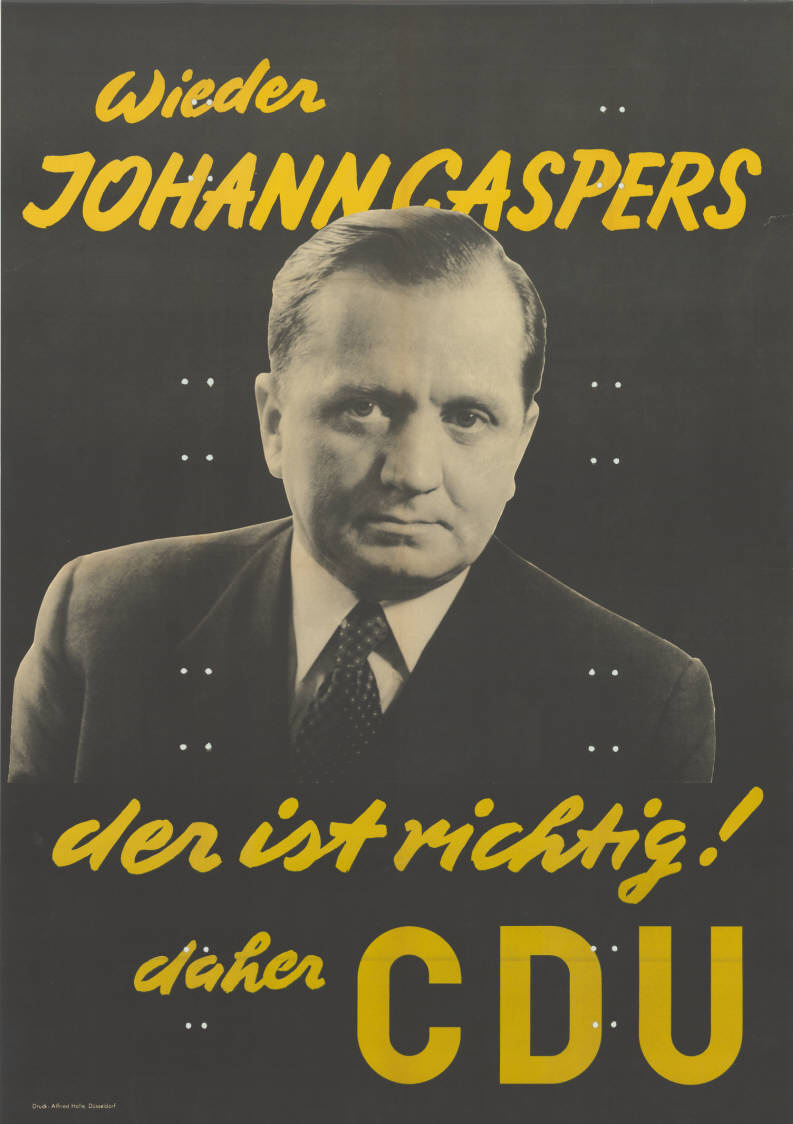
- Johannes Caspers on an election poster

Member of the Bundestag
- In office 6 October 1953 – 15 October 1961

Personal details
- Born: 8 June 1910 Daun
- Died: 20 September 1986 (aged 76) Düsseldorf, North Rhine-Westphalia, Germany
- Party: CDU

Johannes Caspers (June 8, 1910 – September 20, 1986) was a German politician of the Christian Democratic Union (CDU) and former member of the German Bundestag.

== Life ==
In 1946 he joined the CDU and became a member of the Düsseldorf district executive committee in 1947. He was a member of the German Bundestag from 1953 to 1961. He represented the constituency of Düsseldorf II in parliament.

== Literature ==
Herbst, Ludolf; Jahn, Bruno (2002). Vierhaus, Rudolf (ed.). Biographisches Handbuch der Mitglieder des Deutschen Bundestages. 1949–2002 [Biographical Handbook of the Members of the German Bundestag. 1949–2002] (in German). München: De Gruyter - De Gruyter Saur. p. 1715. ISBN 978-3-11-184511-1.
