= Sara Nanni =

German politician (born 1987)

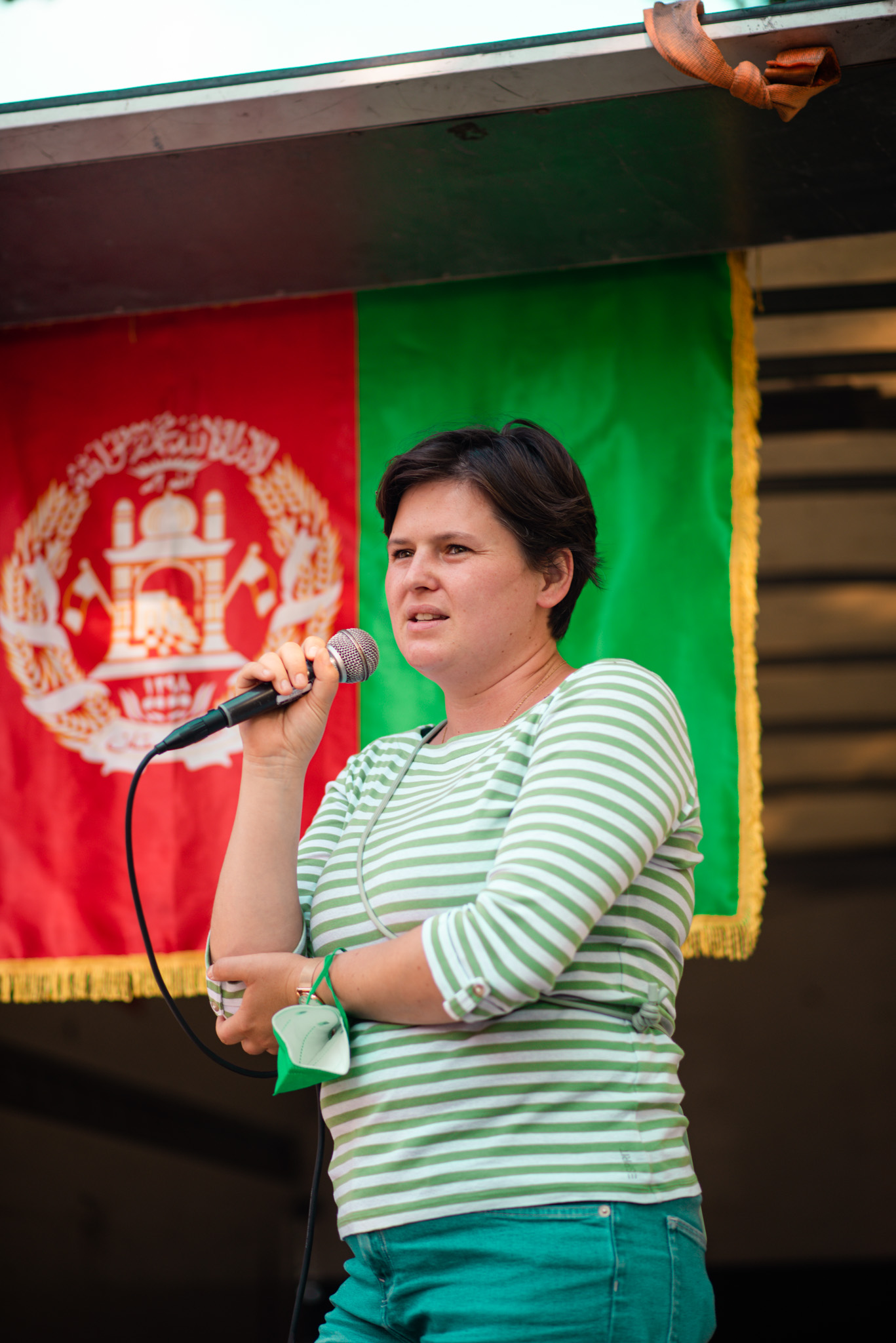
- Nanni in 2021

Member of the Bundestag
- Incumbent
- Assumed office 26 October 2021
- Constituency: North Rhine-Westphalia

Personal details
- Born: 1987 (age 38–39) Datteln, Germany
- Party: Alliance 90/The Greens

Sara Nanni (born 1987) is a German politician of the Alliance 90/The Greens who has been serving as a member of the Bundestag since the 2021 German federal election. She was elected on the party list for North-Rhine Westphalia.

== Early life and education ==
Nanni holds a master's degree in peace and conflict studies from TU Darmstadt.

== Political career ==
In parliament, Nanni has been serving on the Defence Committee and the Subcommittee on the United Nations. In 2022, she also joined the parliamentary body charged with overseeing a 100 billion euro special fund to strengthen Germany's armed forces. She is her parliamentary group's spokesperson on defense policy.

In addition to her committee assignments, as she speaks fluent French, Nanni has been a member of the German delegation to the Franco-German Parliamentary Assembly since 2022.

== Other activities ==
- Federal Academy for Security Policy (BAKS), Member of the Advisory Board (since 2022)
- Heinrich Böll Foundation, Member of the Europe/Transatlantic Advisory Board (since 2022)
- German United Services Trade Union (ver.di), Member
- Amnesty International, Member
