= Andreas Rimkus =

German politician

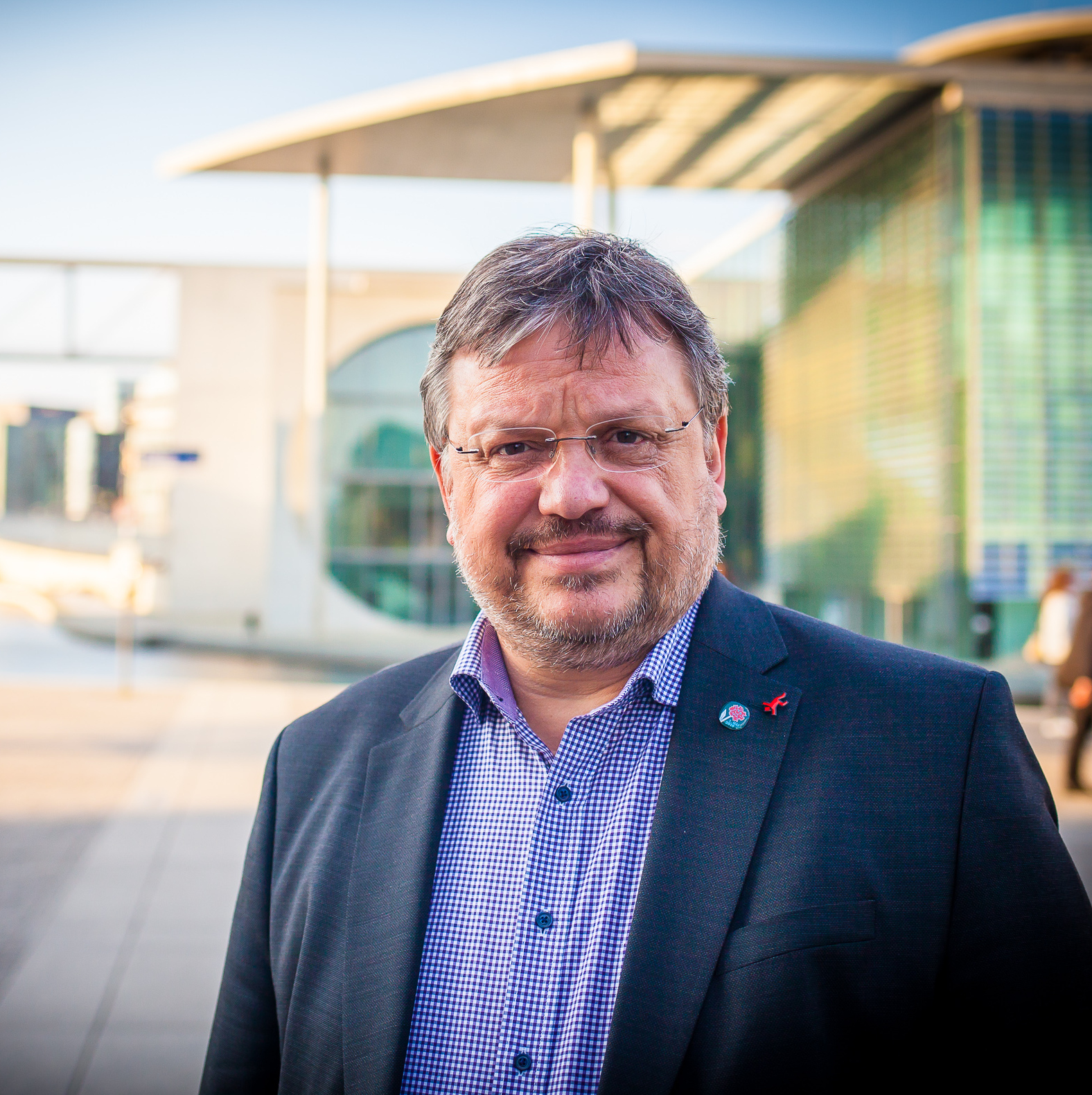
- Rimkus in 2019

Member of the Bundestag
- In office 2013–2025

Personal details
- Born: 24 December 1962 (age 62) Düsseldorf, West Germany
- Party: Social Democratic Party

Andreas Rimkus (born 24 December 1962) is a German electrician and politician of the Social Democratic Party (SPD) who served as a member of the Bundestag from the state of North Rhine-Westphalia from 2013 to 2025.

== Political career ==
Rimkus became a member of the Bundestag in the 2013 German federal election. In parliament, he was a member of the Committee on Transport and Digital Infrastructure from 2013 until 2017 before moving to the Committee on Economic Affairs and Energy in 2018. In this capacity, he served as his parliamentary group's rapporteur on Germany's National Hydrogen Strategy.

In addition to his committee assignments, Rimkus was part of the German-Japanese Parliamentary Friendship Group and the German Parliamentary Friendship Group for relations with Belgium and Luxembourg.

In the 2021 German federal election he won a direct mandate in Düsseldorf II, where he stood in 2013 and 2017.

Within the SPD parliamentary group, Rimkus belonged to the Parliamentary Left, a left-wing movement.

In February 2024, Rimkus announced that he would not stand in the 2025 federal elections but instead resign from active politics by the end of the parliamentary term.

== Other activities ==
- Business Forum of the Social Democratic Party of Germany, Member of the Political Advisory Board (since 2020)
- German United Services Trade Union (ver.di), Member
