= Committee on European Affairs and Oversight of the European Funds =

Standing Committee of the National Assembly of Bulgaria

The Committee on European Affairs and Oversight of the European Funds (CEAOEF) is one of the 17 standing committees in the 41st National Assembly of the Republic of Bulgaria.

The committee is in charge of the accurate transposition of the European Union's legislation, the examination of draft legislative proposals of the EU and of the oversight of the spending of the European funds in Bulgaria. Through CEAOEF, the National Parliament participates in the political dialogue with institutions of the EU regarding recent issues on the EU political agenda and exercises its new powers according to the Treaty of Lisbon.

Regular meetings of the Committee take place every Wednesday in the building of the National Assembly on Knqz Alexander I blvd. To achieve full transparency, the meetings are open to the public. Furthermore, news, transcripts from sessions, reports from hearings and positions on examined legislative proposals are frequently posted on the committee's official webpage.

Apart from the stated parliamentary tasks and chores, CEAOEF attempts to introduce the Bulgarian citizens with the current European issues and topics. Numerous initiatives and projects are undertaken in that direction: the formation of a "European corner" within the National Assembly, the initiating of the "European talks in the Parliament" forum, the formation of "Council for public consultation" which supports the activities of the committee, as well as the participation of the members of the committee in numerous seminars and conferences.

== History ==
The Committee on European Affairs was founded as a specialised parliamentary structure – Council for European Affairs for work under the negotiations for accession of the country within the European Union (EU) with Rules of Organization and Procedure on the 38th National Assembly. The team consisted of chairperson, deputy chairperson, three members of parliament from each parliamentary group and the members of the Joint Parliamentary Committee Bulgaria – European Union. The chairperson of the committee – Council for European Affairs was the chairperson of the National Assembly – Jordan Sokolov.

In the mandate of the 39th National Assembly, the committee was established as the Committee of European Integration. During this period its main functions were associated with the formation and conduct of the Bulgarian pre-accession politics. The committee's key responsibility was the examination of the relevant legislation proposals with the EU legislation, which assisted the government along the transposition of the significantly vast acquis communautaire. The chairperson at that time was Daniel Valchev.

Within the 40th National Assembly, after the accession of Bulgaria to the European Union on 1 January 2007, the focus of the committee's activity was shifted towards the decision-making process on a European level. Chairperson at the time was Atanas Paparizov (24 August 2005 – 20 May 2007) together with Mladen Chervenqkov (28 September 2007 – 25 June 2009). Since 2009, along with the Rules of Organization and Procedure of the 41st National Assembly, political control of the management of the EU funds in Bulgaria was also added as main function of the committee. The committee itself was renamed to Committee on European Affairs and Oversight of the European Funds. Svetlen Tanchev was chosen as first chairperson, who was replaced by Monika Panayotova in July 2010. In February 2013, following the appointment of Monika Panayotova as Member of the European parliament, as chair of the committee is elected Mrs. Dzhema Grozdanova. All three of them are members of the parliamentary group of political party of GERB.

== Members of the Committee ==
The Committee consists of 18 members of parliament, along with a secretariat consisting of 5 experts and interns from Bulgarian and foreign universities.

== Competences and functions ==
The committee's competences fall within the following main areas:

1. Parliamentary observation and control of the European affairs including:
  - Control over the transposition of EU legislation into the national one;
  - Scrutiny of EU draft acts in terms of observation of the subsidiarity and proportionality principles – with the acceptance of the Lisbon Treaty in December 2009, the role of the Bulgarian parliament strengthens and adjusts in accordance with the altitude of the decision-making process of the EU. This is depicted by the opportunity to actively take part in the so-called "The Early Warning Mechanism" and to state its view on a legislation proposal, when it believes it is not in accordance with the principle of subsidiarity. Consequently, the National Assembly adapts the procedure of analysing the legislation proposals of the EU, to control of the subsidiarity checks within the 8 week expiration of the Treaty of Lisbon.
  - Political dialogue with European institutions.
2. Parliamentary oversight and control over the management of the EU funds – by regular hearings of members of the Executive power, which are in charge of the management and implementation of the various European programmes and financial instruments. After the regular meetings, CEAOEF prepares customary reports (interim and annual) of the management of the EU funds in Bulgaria.
3. Inter-parliamentary cooperation – participation in the Conference of the Committees on European Affairs of the EU members and the member candidates for COSAC, as well as the different inter-parliamentary meetings of bilateral and multilateral base.
4. Constant communication with representatives of the civil society – through the establishment of a discussion forum under the auspices of the committee – the Council for Public Consultations, members of the committee are able to have immediate contact, get directly informed about problems and 'hot-topics' and discuss freely issues on the current political agenda.

== Annual work program of the National Assembly on European Union Issues ==
The committee's commitments to the European Affairs are thoroughly specified in Chapter 10 of the Rules of Organization and Procedure of the national Assembly – "Parliamentary Observation and Control of the EU Affairs", along with the key issues which can be found in the Annual Work Program of the National Assembly for the EU affairs. After the acceptance of the Treaty of Lisbon, The National Assembly adapted an innovative method of dealing with the Annual Work Program of the National Assembly for the EU affairs through involving all intrigued parties- the European Commission, the European Parliament, the Council of the European Union, the National Assembly and the Council of Ministers. The Annual Work Program is based on the key priorities of the Work program of the European Commission together with the Trio Presidency of the EU. Therefore, this gives a greater strategic focus of the National Assembly's work regarding the national and domestic priority issues. Leading principle when shaping the Annual Work Program is to include the priority projects from the so-called new files a.k.a. receipts based on which the national parliament ca exercise control in accordance with the principle of subsidiarity. Thus, the Annual Work Program and the National Assembly further transform into a strategic document through which the Bulgarian parliament participates in the legislation process of the EU level.

For the years 2011 and 2012, following the new adopted approach, the Annual Work Program and the National Assembly have been fully in accordance with the Work Program of the EU after a comprehensive contribution of figures from the European Commission. When preparing the Annual Work Program of the National Assembly in 2011, thanks to the CEAOEF, the European Commissioner of International Cooperation, Humanitarian Aid and Crisis Response Kristalina Georgieva presented the key issues from the Annual Work Program of the EU for 2011 in front of the MPs. This custom has sustained for the preparation of the Annual Work program of the National Assembly for 2012. Likewise, the deputy chairperson of the European Commission and Commissioner of the Inter-Institutional Relations and Administration Marosh Shechovich introduced the key aspects of the Work Program of the European Commission for 2012 to the Bulgarian MPs.

== The Council for Public Consultations with CEAOEF ==
The Council of public consultation was founded in March 2010 based on Article 13 from the Principle of Organization and Response. The Committee on European Affairs and Oversight of the European Funds was basically its supportive advisory. The main goal of the organisation is to consult CEAOEF in applying its functions regarding the parliamentary observation and oversight of the EU affairs and the control of the EU funds and projects. Within the council there are 60 organisations: employers, trade unions, NGOs, researches etc. In this particular format, the Council appears to be a valuable support for the committee's chores and at the same time it works as a solid link between the civil society and the legislative and executive powers. The council's activity is guided by the Principles of organisation and procedure.

To improve the flow of information towards the civil society concerning Bulgaria's membership in the EU, the Council holds meetings dedicated to current matters on the European political agenda – "Europe 2020" – Strategy for an intellectual, sustainable and inclusive growth, European semester, The Single Market Act, the future of the Cohesion Policy 2014–2020, the youth unemployment and prospects for employment throughout the youth.

== European talks in the Parliament ==
In 2011, led by the desire to make the European topics closer and more comprehensible to the citizens, initiated by CEAOEF and under the patronage of the Chairperson of the National Assembly, Tsetska Tsacheva, the initiation "European talks in parliament" is launched. It is basically a forum devoted to providing publicity and triggering discussions of the most emblematic events and processes from the European agenda. Using the public debates, the Committee aims to extend the direct contact between the civil society, businessmen and entrepreneurs, non-governmental sector and the academic fields regarding the current strategic issues related to Europe's development. The events take place in the plenary in the National Assembly and are broadcast live on the webpage of the Parliament.

The first public debate from the series of "European talks in Parliament" took place on 19 December 2011 and was dedicated on the topic: "Two years after Lisbon – Europe towards where?”

== Reports on the activities of the Committee in the framework of the presidencies of the EU ==
Annual report on the absorption of European funds in the Republic of Bulgaria for year 2011 – Summary (8 February 2012)

Management of EU Funds in the Republic of Bulgaria. Progress & Effects – Summary (4 December 2012)
