= Young Union =

Youth organisation of the CDU/CSU

Young Union Junge Union
- Chairman: Johannes Winkel
- Secretary General: Arvid Hüsgen
- Founded: 1947
- Headquarters: Leipziger Platz 11, D-10117 Berlin
- Ideology: Christian democracy
- Position: Centre-right
- Mother party: Christian Democratic Union; Christian Social Union in Bavaria
- International affiliation: International Young Democrat Union
- Website: junge-union.de

The Young Union of Germany (German: Junge Union Deutschlands), or simply JU, is the joint youth organisation of the CDU/CSU coalition in Germany. Membership is limited to individuals between 14 and 35 years of age.

The Junge Union claims to be the largest political youth organization in Germany and Europe with about 100,000 members.

== Political positions ==
=== Principles ===
The JU views itself as an organization that aims to further the goals of its parent political parties, CDU/CSU, among the German youth, and to represent the interests of the younger generation within the CDU/CSU parties. In its platform, it defines itself as a liberal, conservative, yet progressive organization.

=== Political Positions ===
The JU is committed to democracy and a social market economy. It supports European integration and a strong partnership with the United States within the framework of NATO. Within its parent parties, the Junge Union advocates political reform. One central objective is a remodeling of the public social security system which is confronted by an increasing dependency ratio. The JU supports intergenerational equity in the areas of pension and health care system reforms, proposing to complement these systems with capital-based private accounts in order to address fiscal problems such as Germany's debt-to-GDP ratio. The JU views labor-market liberalization as an effective means to battle unemployment. It favors university tuition fees, and has expressed support for the Center Against Expulsions in Berlin.

=== Foreign policy ===
In foreign policy, the JU is committed to a German-American security alliance, and called for Germany to participate in the War against Iraq. It opposes Turkey's full membership in the European Union, preferring for them to have a privileged partnership with the EU.

== Prominent former members of the Junge Union ==
- Hermann Gröhe – German minister of health (2013–2018)
- Karl-Theodor zu Guttenberg – German minister of defence (2009–11)
- Volker Kauder – Leader of the CDU/CSU Group in the Bundestag (2005–18)
- Roland Koch – Minister-president of Hesse (1999–2010)
- Helmut Kohl – Chancellor of Germany (1982–98)
- Jan Löffler – Member of the Landtag of Saxony (2009-)
- Günther Oettinger – Minister-president of Baden-Württemberg (2005–10), European Commissioner (since 2010)
- Wolfgang Schäuble – German minister of the interior (1989–91 and 2005–09), minister of finance (2009–17), president of the Bundestag (since 2017)
- Friedrich Merz - Chancellor of Germany (2025-)
- Jens Spahn – German minister of health (2018–2021)
- Edmund Stoiber – Minister-president of Bavaria (1993–2007)
- Christian Wulff – Minister-president of Lower Saxony (2003–10), President of Germany (2010–12)
- Dorothee Bär – German Minister for Digitalisation (2018–2021), German Minister for Research, Technology and Space (2025–)

== Chairpersons ==
- Bruno Six (1947–1948)
- Alfred Sagner (1948–1949)
- Josef Dufhues (1949–1950)
- Ernst Majonica (1950–1955)
- Gerhard Stoltenberg (1955–1961)
- Bert Even (1961–1963)
- Egon Klepsch (1963–1969)
- Jürgen Echternach (1969–1973)
- Matthias Wissmann (1973–1983)
- Christoph Böhr (1983–1989)
- Hermann Gröhe (1989–1994)
- Klaus Escher (1994–1998)
- Hildegard Müller (1998–2002)
- Philipp Mißfelder (2002–2014)
- Paul Ziemiak (2014–2018)
- Tilman Kuban (2018–2022)
- Johannes Winkel (since 2022)

== International relations ==
The JU is a member of the Youth of the European People's Party (YEPP), an umbrella organisation of Christian Democratic and conservative youth organisations of Europe. It collaborates closely with all European partner organisations but has traditionally had strong ties to the neighboring Junge Österreichische Volkspartei (JVP), the youth organisation of the Austrian People's Party.

All International Affairs are coordinated by the International Commission, which is chaired by Maximilian Mörseburg MdB as International Secretary and his deputies Manuel Knoll MdL and Moritz Übermuth.
