= Beatrix Philipp =

German politician (1945–2019)

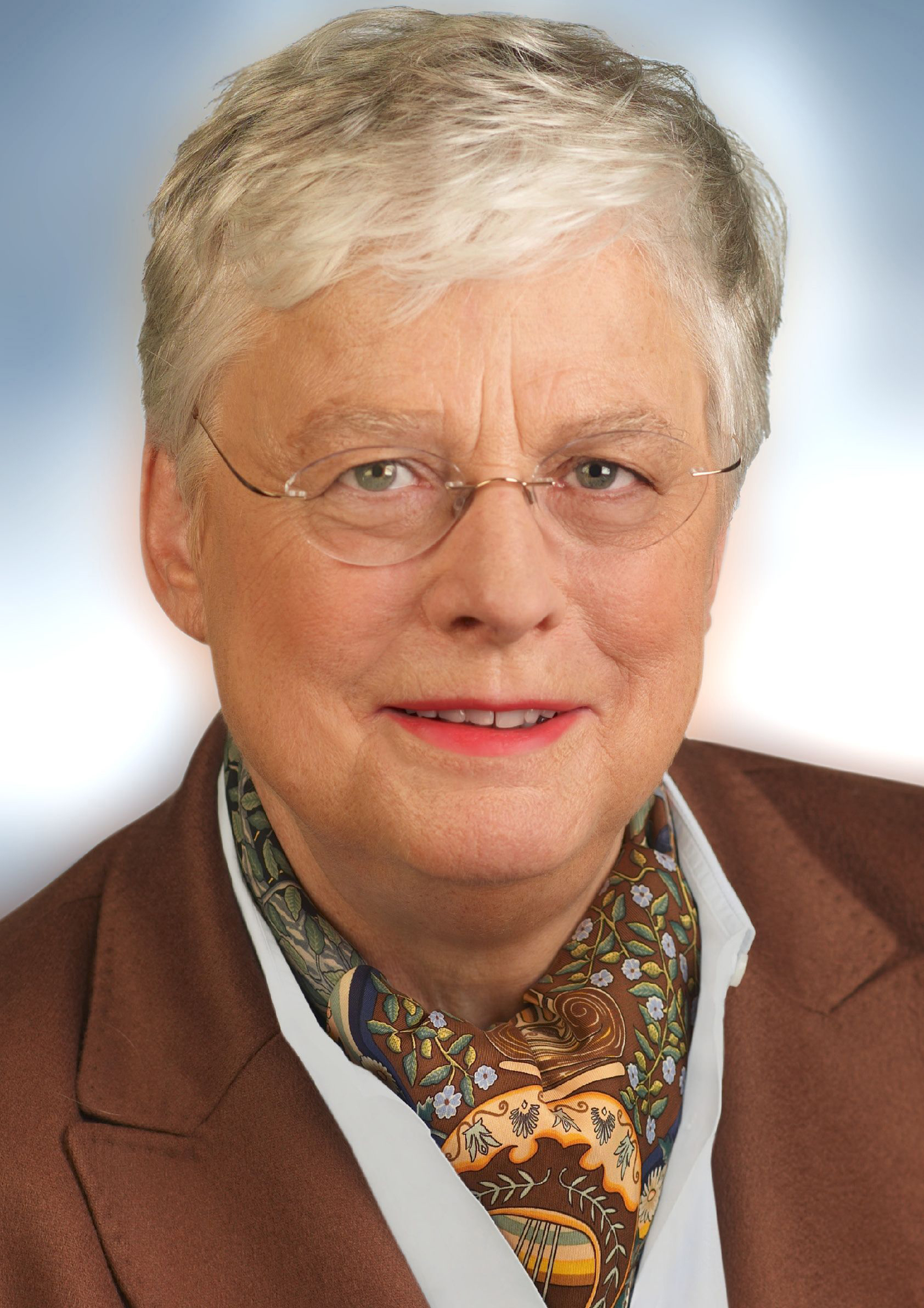
Philipp in 2010

Beatrix Philipp (née Hellweg; 7 July 1945 – 1 May 2019) was a German politician for the Christian Democratic Union (CDU). She initially served on the city council of Düsseldorf from 1975 to 1985 before becoming a member of the Landtag of North Rhine-Westphalia. In 1994, she was elected to the national Bundestag, serving until 2013. Outside of politics, Philipp was a headmistress.

Philipp was born in Mönchengladbach. She had two children and was a Roman Catholic. She died in 2019, at the age of 73, in Düsseldorf.
