= Münster (electoral district) =

Federal electoral district of Germany

128 Münster
- Electoral district for the Bundestag
- Münster in 2025
- State: North Rhine-Westphalia
- Population: 315,300 (2019)
- Electorate: 233,953 (2021)
- Major settlements: Münster
- Area: 303.3 km^{2}

Current electoral district
- Created: 1949
- Party: GRÜNE
- Member: Sylvia Rietenberg
- Elected: 2025

Münster is an electoral constituency (German: Wahlkreis) represented in the Bundestag. It elects one member via first-past-the-post voting. Under the current constituency numbering system, it is designated as constituency 128. It is located in northern North Rhine-Westphalia, comprising the city of Münster.

Münster was created for the inaugural 1949 federal election. From 2021 to 2025, it has been represented by Maria Klein-Schmeink of the Alliance 90/The Greens. Since 2025 it is represented by Sylvia Rietenberg of the Alliance 90/The Greens.

== Geography ==
Münster is located in northern North Rhine-Westphalia. As of the 2021 federal election, it is coterminous with the independent city of Münster.

== History ==
Münster was created in 1949, then known as Münster-Stadt und -Land. It acquired its current name in the 1965 election. In the 1949 election, it was North Rhine-Westphalia constituency 38 in the numbering system. From 1953 through 1961, it was number 97. From 1965 through 1976, it was number 95. From 1980 through 1998, it was number 99. From 2002 through 2009, it was number 130. In the 2013 through 2021 elections, it was number 129. From the 2025 election, it has been number 128.

Originally, the constituency comprised the city of Münster and the Landkreis Münster district. From 1965 through 1976, it comprised the city of Münster and the municipalities of Amelsbüren, Handorf, Hiltrup, and St. Mauritz from the Landkreis Münster district. Since the 1980 election, it has been coterminous with the city of Münster.

Election	No.	Name	Borders
1949	38	Münster-Stadt und -Land	Münster city; Landkreis Münster district
1953	97	Münster-Stadt und -Land	Münster city; Landkreis Münster district
1957	97	Münster-Stadt und -Land	Münster city; Landkreis Münster district
1961	97	Münster-Stadt und -Land	Münster city; Landkreis Münster district
1965	95	Münster	Münster city; Landkreis Münster district (only Amelsbüren, Handorf, Hiltrup, and St. Mauritz municipalities)
1969	95	Münster	Münster city; Landkreis Münster district (only Amelsbüren, Handorf, Hiltrup, and St. Mauritz municipalities)
1972	95	Münster	Münster city; Landkreis Münster district (only Amelsbüren, Handorf, Hiltrup, and St. Mauritz municipalities)
1976	95	Münster	Münster city; Landkreis Münster district (only Amelsbüren, Handorf, Hiltrup, and St. Mauritz municipalities)
1980	99	Münster	Münster city
1983	99	Münster	Münster city
1987	99	Münster	Münster city
1990	99	Münster	Münster city
1994	99	Münster	Münster city
1998	99	Münster	Münster city
2002	130	Münster	Münster city
2005	130	Münster	Münster city
2009	130	Münster	Münster city
2013	129	Münster	Münster city
2017	129	Münster	Münster city
2021	129	Münster	Münster city
2025	128	Münster	Münster city

== Members ==
The constituency has been held by the Christian Democratic Union (CDU) during all but two Bundestag terms since 1949. It was first represented by Peter Nellen of the CDU from 1949 to 1961, followed by Hermann Diebäcker for two terms and Franz Berding for one. Friedrich-Adolf Jahn was then representative from 1972 to 1994. He was succeeded by Ruprecht Polenz from 1994 to 2002. Christoph Strässer of the Social Democratic Party (SPD) was elected in 2002 and re-elected in 2005, but former member Polenz regained the constituency for the CDU in 2009. Sybille Benning was elected in 2013 and re-elected in 2017. Maria Klein-Schmeink was elected for the Greens in 2021. Sylvia Rietenberg was elected for the Greens in 2025.

Election	Member	Party	%
1949	Peter Nellen	CDU	34.6
1953	Peter Nellen	CDU	67.8
1957	Peter Nellen	CDU	64.8
1961	Hermann Diebäcker	CDU	50.0
1965	Hermann Diebäcker	CDU	57.0
1969	Franz Berding	CDU	49.5
1972	Friedrich-Adolf Jahn	CDU	48.4
1976	Friedrich-Adolf Jahn	CDU	51.0
1980	Friedrich-Adolf Jahn	CDU	47.6
1983	Friedrich-Adolf Jahn	CDU	51.8
1987	Friedrich-Adolf Jahn	CDU	45.2
1990	Friedrich-Adolf Jahn	CDU	42.7
1994	Ruprecht Polenz	CDU	44.0
1998	Ruprecht Polenz	CDU	44.2
2002	Christoph Strässer	SPD	40.8
2005	Christoph Strässer	SPD	41.7
2009	Ruprecht Polenz	CDU	39.3
2013	Sybille Benning	CDU	38.8
2017	Sybille Benning	CDU	37.2
2021	Maria Klein-Schmeink	GRÜNE	32.3
2025	Sylvia Rietenberg	GRÜNE	31.2

== Election results ==
=== 2025 election ===
Federal election (2025): Münster
Notes:	Blue background denotes the winner of the electorate vote. Pink background denotes a candidate elected from their party list. Yellow background denotes an electorate win by a list member, or other incumbent. A ✓ or ✗ denotes status of any incumbent, win or lose respectively.						
Party	Candidate	Votes	%	±%	Party votes	%	±%
Greens	Sylvia Rietenberg	64,529	31.2	▼1.1	55,149	26.6	▼4.1
CDU	Stefan Nacke	58,996	28.5	▲2.4	53,313	25.7	▲3.3
SPD	Svenja Schulze	42,553	20.6	▼3.5	37,437	18.1	▼5.4
Left	Kathrin Gebel	14,083	6.8	▲3.2	25,927	12.5	▲7.5
AfD	Helmut Birke	13,426	6.5	▲3.8	14,210	6.9	▲4.0
FDP	Franziska Brandmann	6,779	3.3	▼3.4	9,629	4.6	▼6.0
BSW					5,525	2.7	
Volt	Maren Berkenheide	3,807	1.8	▲0.6	2,237	1.1	▲0.2
PARTEI	Jurian Thomas	2,642	1.3	▲0.1	1,051	0.5	▼0.4
Tierschutzpartei					1,361	0.7	0.0
FW		408		▼0.5	408	0.2	▼0.2
PdF					303	0.1	▲0.1
dieBasis				▼0.8	207	0.1	▼0.6
Team Todenhöfer					160	0.1	▼0.3
BD					128	0.1	
MERA25					93	0.0	
Values					59	0.0	
MLPD					26	0.0	0.0
ÖDP				▼0.5			▼0.2
Pirates							▼0.2
Humanists							▼0.1
Gesundheitsforschung							▼0.1
Bündnis C							0.0
SGP							0.0
Informal votes		1,207			799		
Total valid votes		206,815			207,223		
Turnout		208,022	87.5	▲3.6			
Greens hold	Majority	5,533	2.7				

=== 2021 election ===
Federal election (2021): Münster
Notes:	Blue background denotes the winner of the electorate vote. Pink background denotes a candidate elected from their party list. Yellow background denotes an electorate win by a list member, or other incumbent. A ✓ or ✗ denotes status of any incumbent, win or lose respectively.						
Party	Candidate	Votes	%	±%	Party votes	%	±%
Greens	Maria Klein-Schmeink	63,160	32.3	▲19.6	60,036	30.7	▲16.1
CDU	Stefan Nacke	51,096	26.2	▼11.0	43,790	22.4	▼10.4
SPD	Svenja Schulze	47,047	24.1	▼4.8	45,844	23.5	▲2.6
FDP	Klaus Kretzer	13,038	6.7	▼0.3	20,786	10.6	▼2.9
AfD	Helmut Birke	5,234	2.7	▼1.8	5,603	2.9	▼2.1
Left	Kira Sawilla	7,078	3.6	▼3.2	9,746	5.0	▼5.2
Volt	Carina Beckmann	2,505	1.3		1,812	0.9	
PARTEI	Roland Scholle	2,283	1.2	▼0.3	1,684	0.9	▼0.2
dieBasis	Peter Balint	1,582	0.8		1,409	0.7	
Tierschutzpartei					1,326	0.7	▲0.3
Team Todenhöfer					774	0.4	
FW	Olaf Wirl	966	0.5		691	0.4	▲0.2
Pirates					479	0.2	▼0.1
ÖDP	Alina Möller	897	0.5	▼0.1	422	0.2	▼0.1
Independent	Sarah Geselbracht	207	0.1				
Humanists					205	0.1	0.0
V-Partei3					150	0.1	0.0
LIEBE					138	0.1	
Gesundheitsforschung					116	0.1	0.0
du.					93	0.0	
LfK					79	0.0	
DKP	Manfred Stolper	179	0.1	0.0	75	0.0	0.0
PdF					52	0.0	
NPD					45	0.0	0.0
Bündnis C					42	0.0	
LKR					25	0.0	
Independent	Andrea Dumberger	23	0.0				
SGP					22	0.0	0.0
MLPD					12	0.0	0.0
Informal votes		981			820		
Total valid votes		195,295			195,456		
Turnout		196,276	83.9	▲1.6			
Greens gain from CDU	Majority	12,064	6.1				

=== 2017 election ===
Federal election (2017): Münster
Notes:	Blue background denotes the winner of the electorate vote. Pink background denotes a candidate elected from their party list. Yellow background denotes an electorate win by a list member, or other incumbent. A ✓ or ✗ denotes status of any incumbent, win or lose respectively.						
Party	Candidate	Votes	%	±%	Party votes	%	±%
CDU	✓ Sybille Benning	70,606	37.2	▼1.6	62,276	32.8	▼5.1
SPD	Robert von Olberg	54,778	28.9	▼6.6	39,714	20.9	▼6.3
Greens	Maria Klein-Schmeink	24,248	12.8	▲1.7	27,739	14.6	▼0.6
FDP	Jörg Berens	13,219	7.0	▲1.2	25,684	13.5	▲6.7
Left	Hubertus Zdebel	13,024	6.9	▲2.6	19,287	10.1	▲3.9
AfD	Martin Schiller	8,569	4.5	▲2.5	9,393	4.9	▲2.0
PARTEI	Marie Völkering	2,722	1.4		1,935	1.0	▲0.6
Tierschutzpartei					781	0.4	
Pirates	Daniel Düngel	1,003	0.5	▼1.5	712	0.4	▼1.9
ÖDP	Joachim Bruns	1,027	0.5	▲0.1	641	0.3	0.0
DiB					337	0.2	
FW					246	0.1	0.0
Independent	Carlos Abaga Ayingono	224	0.1				
V-Partei³					222	0.1	
BGE					218	0.1	
DM					192	0.1	
Die Humanisten					158	0.1	
Independent	Markus Overdiek	154	0.1				
AD-DEMOKRATEN					137	0.1	
NPD					111	0.1	▼0.2
Volksabstimmung					110	0.1	0.0
Gesundheitsforschung					95	0.0	
DKP	Manfred Stolper	173	0.1		66	0.0	
MLPD	Sebastian Zumdick	107	0.1		64	0.0	0.0
SGP					8	0.0	0.0
Informal votes		1,236			964		
Total valid votes		189,854			190,126		
Turnout		191,090	82.3	▲3.2			
CDU hold	Majority	15,828	8.3	▲4.9			

=== 2013 election ===
Federal election (2013): Münster
Notes:	Blue background denotes the winner of the electorate vote. Pink background denotes a candidate elected from their party list. Yellow background denotes an electorate win by a list member, or other incumbent. A ✓ or ✗ denotes status of any incumbent, win or lose respectively.						
Party	Candidate	Votes	%	±%	Party votes	%	±%
CDU	Sybille Benning	69,352	38.8	▼0.4	67,626	37.8	▲4.1
SPD	Christoph Strässer	63,296	35.4	▲2.8	48,579	27.2	▲3.4
Greens	Maria Klein-Schmeink	19,767	11.1	▼1.7	27,118	15.2	▼2.0
FDP	Daniel Bahr	10,222	5.7	▼4.2	12,119	6.8	▼7.9
Left	Hubertus Zdebel	7,620	4.3	▼0.5	11,254	6.3	▼0.4
AfD	Helmut Birke	3,651	2.0		5,236	2.9	
Pirates	Sasa Raber	3,582	2.0		4,037	2.3	▲0.1
PARTEI					673	0.4	
ÖDP	Sieglinde Kersting	752	0.4		595	0.3	▲0.1
NPD					490	0.3	▼0.1
Independent	Harry Seemann	324	0.2				
Nichtwahler					218	0.1	
FW					195	0.1	
PRO					139	0.1	
Volksabstimmung					123	0.1	0.0
Party of Reason					113	0.1	
BIG					59	0.0	
REP					54	0.0	▼0.1
RRP					52	0.0	0.0
MLPD					51	0.0	0.0
PSG					27	0.0	0.0
Die Rechte					23	0.0	
BüSo					21	0.0	0.0
Informal votes		1,527			1,291		
Total valid votes		178,566			178,802		
Turnout		180,093	79.1	▲1.4			
CDU hold	Majority	6,056	3.4	▼3.3			

=== 2009 election ===
Federal election (2009): Münster
Notes:	Blue background denotes the winner of the electorate vote. Pink background denotes a candidate elected from their party list. Yellow background denotes an electorate win by a list member, or other incumbent. A ✓ or ✗ denotes status of any incumbent, win or lose respectively.						
Party	Candidate	Votes	%	±%	Party votes	%	±%
CDU	Ruprecht Polenz	63,819	39.3	▼2.1	54,902	33.7	▼1.8
SPD	✗ Christoph Strässer	53,029	32.6	▼9.1	38,604	23.7	▼11.6
Greens	Maria Klein-Schmeink	20,822	12.8	▲4.4	27,985	17.2	▲3.8
FDP	Daniel Bahr	16,131	9.9	▲4.8	23,951	14.7	▲4.4
Left	Hubertus Zdebel	7,805	4.8	▲2.2	10,970	6.7	▲2.7
Pirates					3,489	2.1	
NPD	Dennis Dormuth	718	0.4	0.0	574	0.4	0.0
Tierschutzpartei					567	0.3	▲0.1
ÖDP					417	0.3	
FAMILIE					416	0.3	0.0
RENTNER					294	0.2	
REP					175	0.1	0.0
RRP					107	0.1	
Volksabstimmung					89	0.1	0.0
Centre					78	0.0	0.0
MLPD					39	0.0	0.0
DVU					38	0.0	
PSG					19	0.0	0.0
BüSo					17	0.0	0.0
Informal votes		1,362			1,190		
Total valid votes		162,559			162,731		
Turnout		163,921	77.7	▼5.3			
CDU gain from SPD	Majority	10,790	6.7				

=== 2005 election ===
Federal election (2005): Münster
Notes:	Blue background denotes the winner of the electorate vote. Pink background denotes a candidate elected from their party list. Yellow background denotes an electorate win by a list member, or other incumbent. A ✓ or ✗ denotes status of any incumbent, win or lose respectively.						
Party	Candidate	Votes	%	±%	Party votes	%	±%
SPD	✓ Christoph Strässer	70,175	41.7	▲0.9	59,463	35.3	▼0.9
CDU	Ruprecht Polenz	69,638	41.4	▲1.5	59,935	35.6	▲1.3
Greens	Winifried Nachtwei	14,169	8.4	▼1.1	22,570	13.4	▼2.2
FDP	Daniel Bahr	8,666	5.2	▼3.00	17,357	10.3	▼1.0
Left	Lorenz Müller-Morenius	4,381	2.6	▲1.6	6,738	4.0	▲2.6
NPD	Dennis Dormuth	690	0.4		585	0.3	▲0.2
Independent	Harry Seemann	472	0.3				
GRAUEN					457	0.3	▲0.1
Tierschutzpartei					438	0.3	
Familie					409	0.2	▲0.1
REP					198	0.1	
From Now on... Democracy Through Referendum					92	0.1	
Centre					85	0.1	
PBC					79	0.0	
MLPD					41	0.0	
Socialist Equality Party					36	0.0	
BüSo					26	0.0	0.0
Informal votes		1,808			1,490		
Total valid votes		168,191			168,509		
Turnout		169,999	83.0	▼1.5			
SPD hold	Majority	537	0.3				
