= Thomas Bareiß =

German politician (born 1975)

Thomas Bareiß MdB
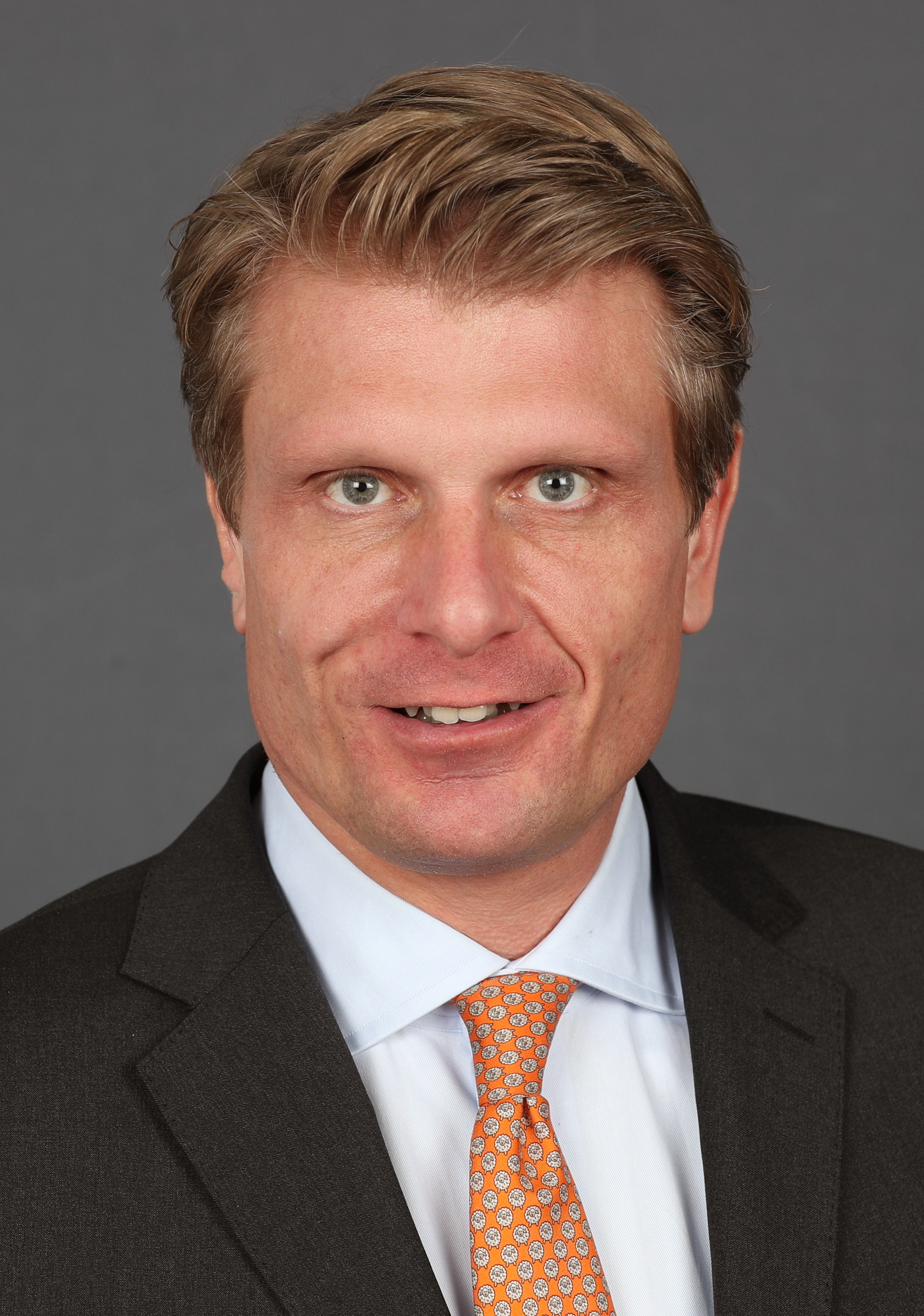
- Bareiß in 2020

Member of the Bundestag; for Zollernalb – Sigmaringen
- Incumbent
- Assumed office 18 October 2005
- Preceded by: Angela Schmid

Personal details
- Born: 15 February 1975 (age 51) Albstadt, West Germany
- Party: Christian Democratic Union
- Education: Ravensburg University of Cooperative Education

Thomas Bareiß (born 15 February 1975) is a German politician of the Christian Democratic Union (CDU) who has been serving as a member of the German Bundestag since 2005. From 2018 to 2021, he held the position of Parliamentary State Secretary at the Federal Ministry of Economic Affairs and Energy in Chancellor Angela Merkel's cabinet.

== Political career ==
A business manager by profession, Bareiß has been a directly elected member of the Bundestag since the 2005 elections. In his first term between 2005 and 2009, he was a full member of the Committee on the Affairs of the European Union as well as of the Committee on Labor and Social Affairs. In that capacity, he served as his parliamentary group's rapporteur on Transatlantic relations. Since the 2009 elections, he has been serving on the Committee on Economic Affairs and Energy.

In the negotiations to form a Grand Coalition of Chancellor Angela Merkel's Christian Democrats (CDU together with the Bavarian CSU) and the Social Democrats (SPD) following the 2013 federal elections, Bareiß was part of the CDU/CSU delegation in the working group on energy policy, led by Peter Altmaier and Hannelore Kraft. Following the 2016 elections in Germany's important state of Baden-Württemberg, he was again part of the negotiations on a coalition government, this time of the CDU and the Green Party under Minister-President Winfried Kretschmann.

With the formation of the fourth Grand Coalition under Merkel in 2018, it was announced that Bareiß would move to the position of Parliamentary State Secretary at the Federal Ministry of Economic Affairs and Energy under Minister Peter Altmaier. In this capacity, he also served as the Federal Government's Commissioner for Tourism (since 2018) and for small and medium-sized enterprises (2020–2021).

Ahead of the Christian Democrats' leadership election in 2018, Bareiß publicly endorsed Friedrich Merz to succeed Angela Merkel as the party's chair.

Since the 2021 elections, Bareiß has been serving as his parliamentary group's spokesperson for transport.

== Political positions ==
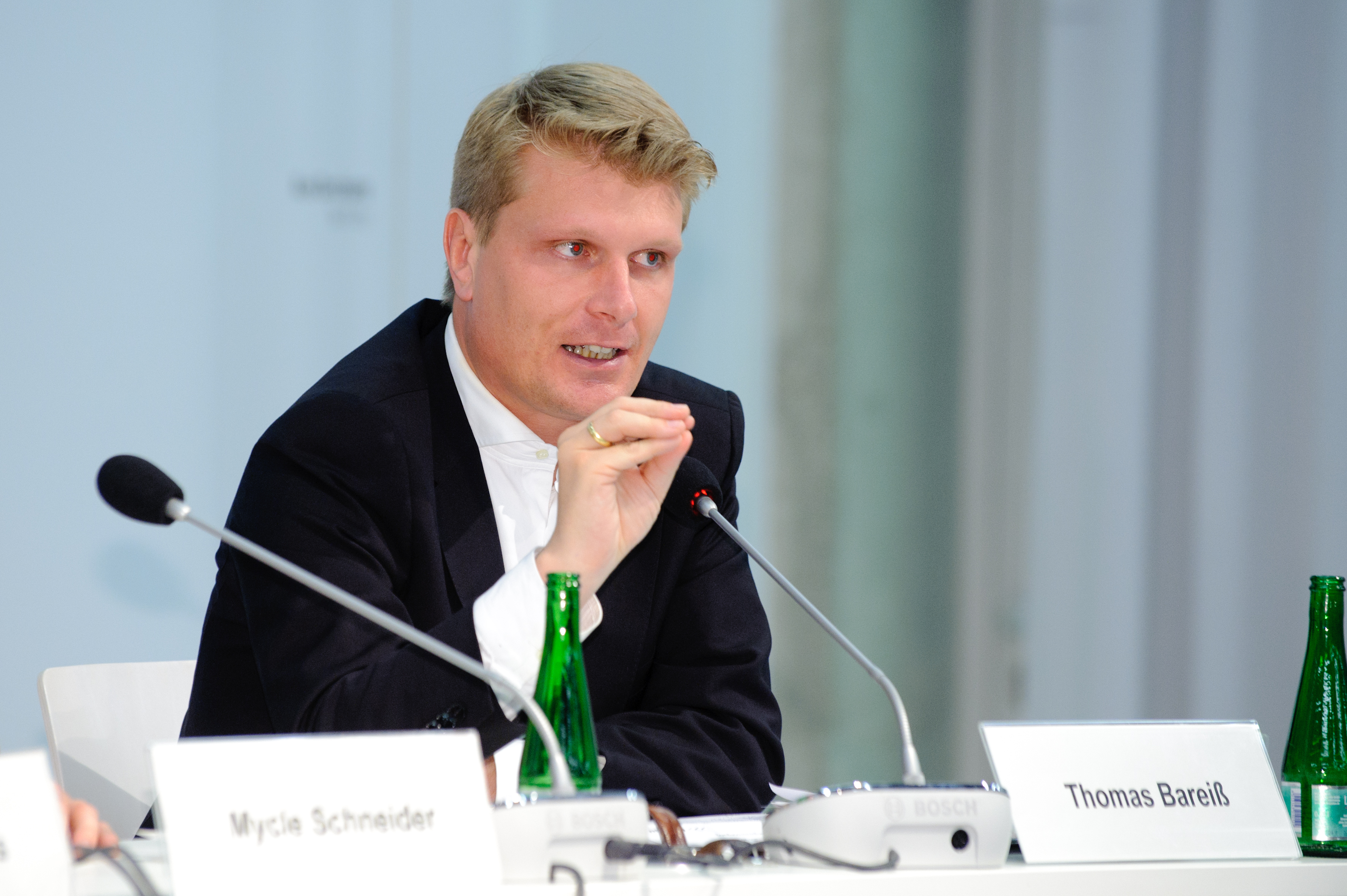
Bareiß in 2010

=== Energy policy ===
In 2010, Bareiß worked to limit the growth in solar-panel installations in Germany as he saw the rising costs to consumers undermine the acceptance of alternative energy. In a letter to then-Environment Minister Norbert Röttgen, he demanded that the government cut the guaranteed gratuity per kilowatt hour for newly installed solar panels by an extra amount.

Amid a 2014 debate over whether Germany needs to rethink its energy strategy and reduce its dependence on Russian gas imports due to the Russo-Ukrainian War, Bareiß spoke out in favor of liquefied natural gas (LNG) imports and demanded an effective regulatory framework for a German LNG terminal.

In early 2025 Bareiß was one of the few politicians who campaigned for a repair of the partially destroyed Nord Stream 2 pipeline. He wanted the transport natural gas from Russia to Germany to resume, as soon as the war, which followed the Russian invasion of Ukraine, was over.

=== Environment ===
Bareiß rejects the introduction of a CO_{2} tax. He has justified this due to the allegedly high costs for broad sections of society being problematic. He is open to CO_{2} emissions trading. After the publication of the Rezo video The destruction of the CDU and the poor performance of the CDU in the 2019 European Parliament election, Bareiß criticized first-time voters and their demand for a CO_{2} tax. In a tweet, Bareiß wrote that when it comes to a CO_{2} tax "if first-time voters make their own money and feel for themselves who has to pay for everything" then "the choice may look different again". Climate activists, young influencers and the media criticized Bareiß for this statement. The parliamentary director of the parliamentary group of the left, Niema Movassat, accused Bareiß of being detached and arrogant in dealing with first-time voters. The CDU politician Ruprecht Polenz also classified Bareiß's tweet as a mistake.

=== European integration ===
On 27 January 2015, Bareiß voted against the Merkel government's proposal for a four-month extension of Greece's bailout; in doing so, he joined a record number of 29 dissenters from the CDU/CSU parliamentary group who expressed skepticism about whether the Greek government under Prime Minister Alexis Tsipras could be trusted to deliver on its reform pledges.

=== Human rights ===
In August 2007, Bareiß joined a travel group to Baku accompanied by lobbyist Otto Hauser, and again in 2010. In June 2012 Bareiß, along with Eduard Lintner, was received by several Azerbaijani ministers.

In June 2017, Bareiß voted against Germany's introduction of same-sex marriage.

== Controversies ==
=== Parliamentwatch ===
In August 2015, Bareiß and 72 other members of parliament were rated "poor" by the abgeordnetenwatch.de platform, because of not answering any questions from citizens on the platform. Bareiß justified this in a letter to the editor to the local press with a reference to the alleged lack of seriousness of the platform.

=== Lobbying allegations ===
In spring of 2020, amid the first outbreak of the COVID-19 pandemic in Germany, Bareiß, who is known for his close relations with Azerbaijan, following a request from there, made a phone call to Löwenstein Medical from the Federal Ministry of Economics, the second largest federal government manufacturer of ventilators in Germany. According to reports in several German media outlets, during the conversation Bareiß "insisted in the telephone call that ventilators be delivered first to Baku and that this was due to the good economic relations between Germany and the Caucasus Republic." The news came at a time when a number of CDU/CSU MPs were implicated in corruption allegations related to face mask procurement during the pandemic and lobbying scandals related to "Azerbaijani Laundromat" and "Caviar diplomacy".

Bareiß rejected the allegations, stating that he "did not exert any pressure," and the call was only to enquire about a delivery date. Subsequently, the company issued an official statement to confirm that: "At no time have we been pressured by Mr. Bareiß, nor have we made such a statement to the press in the above-mentioned event or any other context." The Federal Ministry of Economics also stated that Thomas Bareiß had "at no time asked a representative of Löwenstein Medical to give priority to the delivery of ventilators to Azerbaijan."

=== DUI crash ===
On 12 July 2026 Bareiß was involved in a traffic accident, leaving 3 occupants of another vehicle and himself seriosly injured. Weeks later the public prosecutor's office informed that they are running an investigation against him for causing the accident while driving under influence. A banned synthetic substance in a relevant amount, not associated with medication, had been found in a blood sample taken after the accident. Shortly after the announcement, the Young Union organisation of the CDU in his constituency publicly demanded Bareiß to give up his seat in the Bundestag over the incident.

== Other activities ==
=== Regulatory agencies ===
- Federal Network Agency for Electricity, Gas, Telecommunications, Post and Railway (BNetzA), Member of the Advisory Board (until 2018), Member of the Rail Infrastructure Advisory Council (since 2022)

=== Corporate boards ===
- Deutsche Rockwool Mineralwoll GmbH & Co. OHG, Member of the Advisory Board

=== Non-profits ===
- Association of German Foundations, Member of the Parliamentary Advisory Board
- Friends of the Beuron Archabbey, Member of the Executive Board
- Zukunft Erdgas initiative, Member of the Advisory Board
- German Energy Agency (DENA), Ex-Officio Chairman of the Supervisory Board (2018–2021)
- Agora Energiewende, Member of the Council (until 2018)
- German-Azerbaijani Forum, Member of the Board of Trustees (until 2018)
- Max Planck Institute for Chemical Energy Conversion, Member of the Board of Trustees (until 2018)
- Nuclear Waste Disposal Fund, Member of the Board of Trustees (until 2018)

== See also ==
- List of German Christian Democratic Union politicians
