= Kurze =

Kurze may refer to:

- Kurze, Palghar, a village in India
- Kurzeh, a village in Iran
- Kurze Mountains in Antarctica
- Markus Kurze (born 1970), German politician
- Max Kurze, German military officer
