= Sybille Benning =

German politician (1961–2022)

Sybille Benning MP
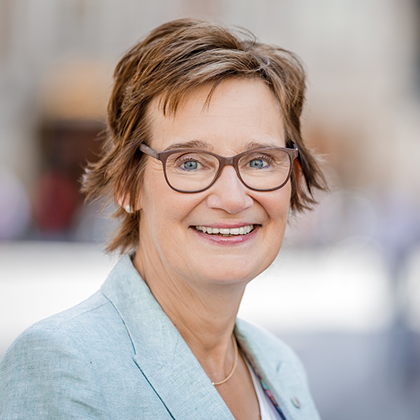

Member of the Bundestag for Münster
- In office 2013–2021
- Preceded by: Ruprecht Polenz
- Succeeded by: Maria Klein-Schmeink

Personal details
- Born: 8 January 1961 Münster, North Rhine-Westphalia, West Germany
- Died: 29 July 2022 (aged 61)
- Party: CDU
- Children: 4
- Education: Weihenstephan-Triesdorf University of Applied Science; Westfälische Wilhelms-Universität Münster
- Occupation: Landscape designer

Sybille Benning (8 January 1961 – 29 July 2022) was a German politician of the Christian Democratic Union (CDU). In the 2013 federal election she was elected to the German Bundestag, representing the city of Münster.

== Early life and career ==
Benning was born in Münster, where she graduated from the Marienschule episcopal high school. Benning completed an apprenticeship in gardening and landscaping and then studied landscape conservation at the Weihenstephan-Triesdorf University of Applied Science. Afterwards she graduated as a geographer (landscape ecology) from Westfälische Wilhelms-Universität Münster.

Benning worked freelance as a landscape designer.

== Political career ==
Benning became a member of the CDU in 2001. She was active in local politics since 2002 and was a directly elected member of the city council of Münster from 2004 to 2013. From 2004 to 2012 she was Deputy Chair of the CDU faction in the Münster Council, from 2008 to 2013 planning spokeswoman for the CDU Council faction.

In the 2013 elections, Benning ran for the direct mandate in the constituency of Münster, which she won with 38.8% of the first votes. In the Bundestag, she was a member of the Committee on Education, Research and Technology Assessment and a deputy member of the Committee on the Environment, Nature Conservation, Building and Nuclear Safety.

On the Committee on Education, Research and Technology Assessment, she served as her parliamentary group’s rapporteur on STEM education and the Deutschlandstipendium scholarship scheme. She was also a member of the Parliamentary Advisory Council on Sustainable Development.

In addition to her committee assignments, Benning was a deputy member of the German delegation to the Parliamentary Assembly of the Council of Europe (PACE) from 2014 to 2021. In this capacity, she served on the Committee on Social Affairs, Health and Sustainable Development (from 2014); the Sub-Committee on Media and Information Society (from 2016); and the Sub-Committee on the Europe Prize (from 2018). In 2019, she was the Assembly’s rapporteur on sustainable urban development.

Benning was also a member of the German-French Parliamentary Friendship Group and the non-partisan Europa-Union Deutschland, which is committed to a federal Europe and the European unification process.

Within the CDU/CSU parliamentary group, Benning belonged to the Münsterland Circle (Münsterlandrunde) which brings together all parliamentarians from the eponymous region in Westphalia; it also includes Anja Karliczek and Jens Spahn, among others.

In September 2020, Benning announced that she would not stand in the 2021 federal elections but instead resign from active politics by the end of the parliamentary term.

== Other activities ==
- Max Planck Institute for Molecular Biomedicine, Member of the Board of Trustees
- Münster Zoo, Substitute Member of the Supervisory Board
- German Life Saving Association (DLRG), Member

== Political positions ==
In June 2017, Benning voted against her parliamentary group’s majority and in favor of Germany’s introduction of same-sex marriage.

Ahead of the Christian Democrats’ leadership election in 2018, Benning publicly endorsed Annegret Kramp-Karrenbauer to succeed Angela Merkel as the party’s chair. In 2019, she joined 14 members of her parliamentary group who, in an open letter, called for the party to rally around Merkel and Kramp-Karrenbauer amid criticism voiced by conservatives Friedrich Merz and Roland Koch.

== Personal life ==
Benning was married and had two daughters and two sons. From 1990 until 1993, the family lived in Paris. In 2008, she was treated for cancer.

In her free time, Benning was a beekeeper.
