= Ruprecht Polenz =

German politician

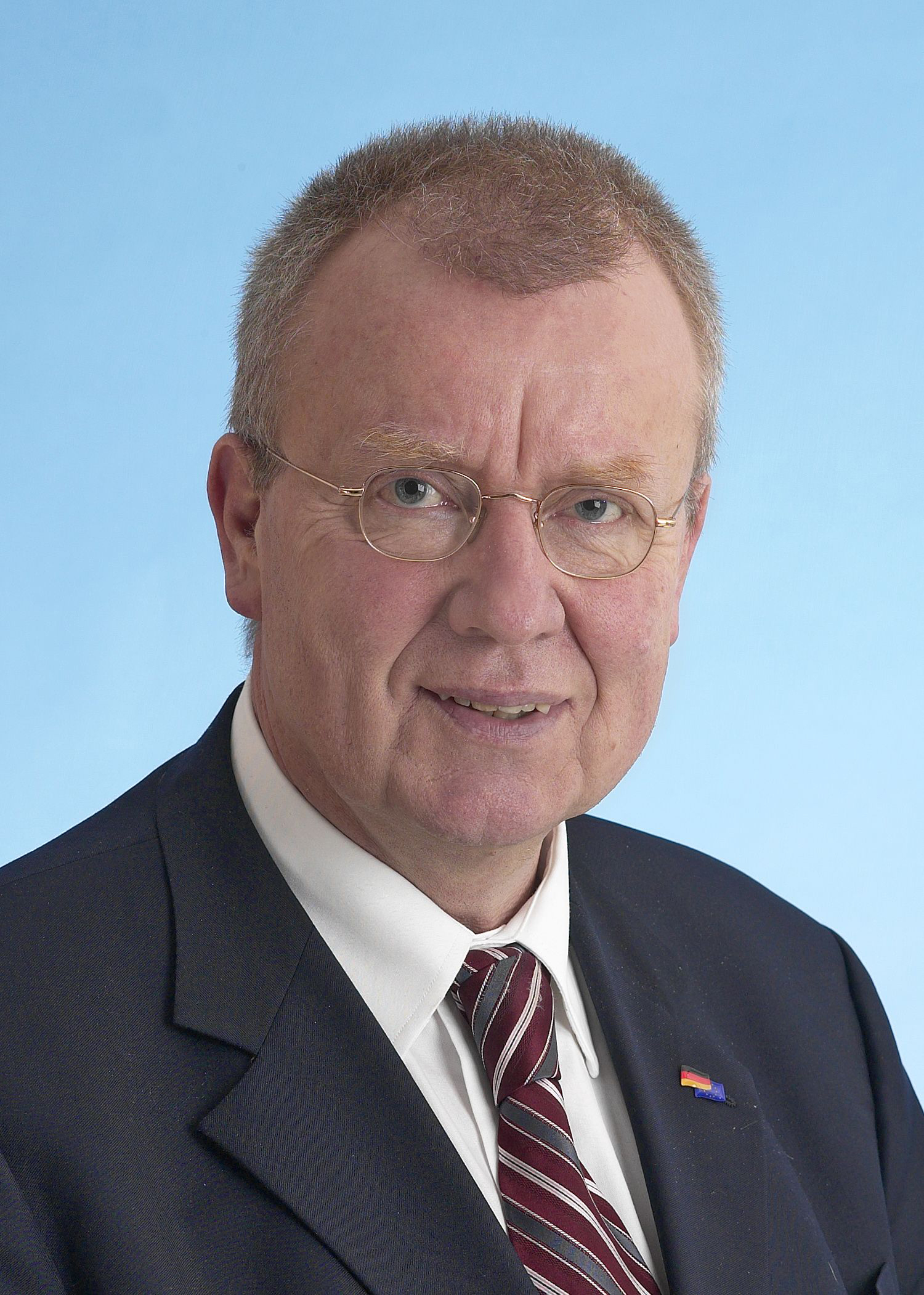
- Polenz in 2012

Secretary General of the Christian Democratic Union
- In office 10 April 2000 – November 2000
- Leader: Angela Merkel
- Preceded by: Angela Merkel
- Succeeded by: Laurenz Meyer

Member of the Bundestag
- In office 1994–2013
- Succeeded by: Sybille Benning

Personal details
- Born: 26 May 1946 (age 80) Großpostwitz, Germany
- Party: CDU
- Education: University of Münster

Ruprecht Polenz (born 26 May 1946) is a German politician and member of the Christian Democratic Union (CDU) political party.

== Political career ==
In the 1994 national elections, Polenz was first voted into the German federal Parliament, the Bundestag. Throughout his time in parliament, he served on the Committee on Foreign Affairs

Polenz became senior member of the CDU party on 10 April 2000 under the leadership of the party's chairwoman Angela Merkel. He was the party's secretary-general from April to November 2000.

Polenz served as chairman of the Committee on Foreign Affairs between 2005 and 2013. He was also a member of the German delegation to the NATO Parliamentary Assembly and a substitute member of the Committee on Cultural and Media Affairs. Additionally, he chaired the Bundestag's Parliamentary Control Panel under Section 41 (5) of the Foreign Trade and Payments Act and was a substitute member of the Joint Committee of the Bundestag and Bundesrat under Article 53 a of the Basic Law.

== Life after politics ==
Following his retirement from active politics, Polenz became president of the German Association for East European Studies (DGO). Between 2013 and 2014, he was a Senior Fellow at the Istanbul Policy Center of Sabancı University.

In November 2015, Foreign Minister Frank-Walter Steinmeier named Polenz Special Envoy for the German-Namibian talks on a joint declaration addressing the colonial-era crackdown against Hereros in Namibia. Polenz has stated that he would consider the killings genocide.

== Political positions ==
In 2008, Polenz and four other legislators issued a committee report which concluded that Germany's under-representation in international organizations at the time was because the country lacked a personnel policy and coherent strategy for promoting itself internationally.

Contrary to his own party, Polenz has been one of Germany's most outspoken proponents of an accession of Turkey to the European Union.

In 2011, Polenz was among the first to speak out publicly against the decision of Quadriga, a German nonprofit group, to honor Prime Minister Vladimir Putin of Russia; the group later canceled its annual prize ceremony following further public criticism of Putin's stance on democracy and human rights in Russia.

Ahead of the Christian Democrats’ leadership election in 2018, Polenz publicly endorsed Annegret Kramp-Karrenbauer to succeed Angela Merkel as the party's chair.

In a well-received, open letter, Polenz turned to Rezo after his video "The destruction of the CDU". The politician largely agreed with the YouTuber's positions on climate protection and the CDU's dealings with young voters, particularly with regard to the Friday for future demonstrators.

He has repeatedly described the AfD as right-wing, right-wing extremist and fascist.

Following poor poll results for the CDU in the fall of 2025 Polenz and some 30 CDU politicians opposed the course taken by Chancellor Friedrich Merz, which they saw as an attempt to weaken the isolation of the AFD and demanded a different strategy instead, asking to ban the AFD by a motion to come from either the Federal government, the Bundestag, or the Bundesrat.

== Other activities (selection) ==
=== Corporate boards ===
- ZDF Enterprises, member of the supervisory board

=== Non-profit organizations ===
- Aktion Deutschland Hilft (Germany's Relief Coalition), deputy chairman of the board of trustees
- Association of German Foundations, member of the Parliamentary Advisory Board
- Center for Global Politics (CGP), Free University of Berlin, member of the advisory board
- Christian-Muslim Society, member of the board of trustees
- Deutsche Initiative für den Nahen Osten (DINO), member of the board of trustees
- European Council on Foreign Relations (ECFR), Member
- Fachhochschule Münster, member of the board of trustees
- German Institute of Global and Area Studies (GIGA), member of the board of trustees
- Green Helmets, member of the board of trustees
- Konrad Adenauer Foundation (KAS), Member
- Petersburger Dialog, Member
- Schengen White List Project, member of the advisory board
- Willy Brandt Foundation, Alternate Member of the board of trustees
- Zentrum Liberale Moderne, member of the international advisory board (since 2017)
- ZDF, chairman of the Television Board (2002–2016)
- Deutsches Orient-Institut, member of the board of trustees (1998–2005)
- German Atlantic Association (DAG), president (1997–2006)
- Marshall Memorial Fellowship (MMF) of the German Marshall Fund (GMF), member of the Selection Committee (1998–2002)
- Westfälische Herzstiftung, member of the board of trustees (2002–2005)

== Personal life ==
Polenz is married and has four children.

== See also ==
- Politics of Germany
