= Zdebel =

Zdebel is a Polish surname. Notable people with the surname include:

- Hubertus Zdebel (born 1954), German politician
- Tomasz Zdebel (born 1973), Polish-German footballer
