= 2018 Christian Democratic Union of Germany leadership election =

Election in Germany

2018 Christian Democratic Union leadership election
- 7–8 December 2018

999 delegates in the 31st CDU National Congress 500 delegates votes needed to win
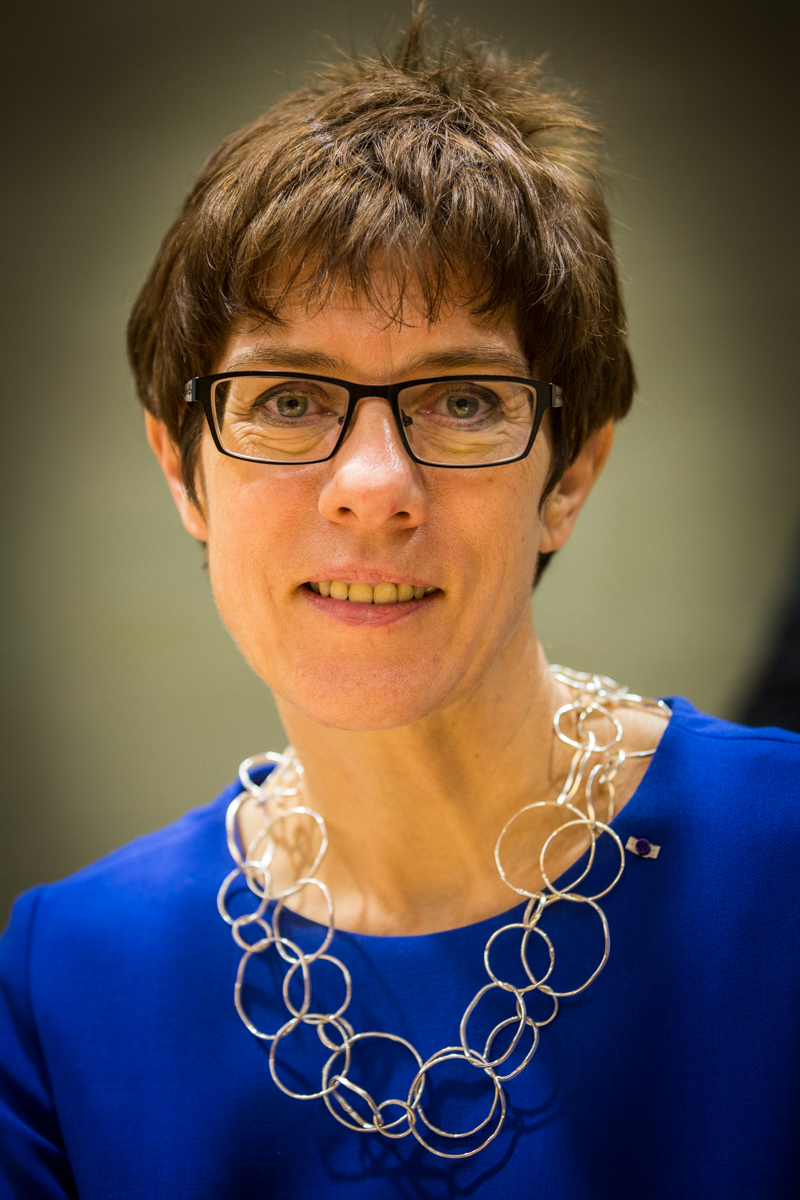

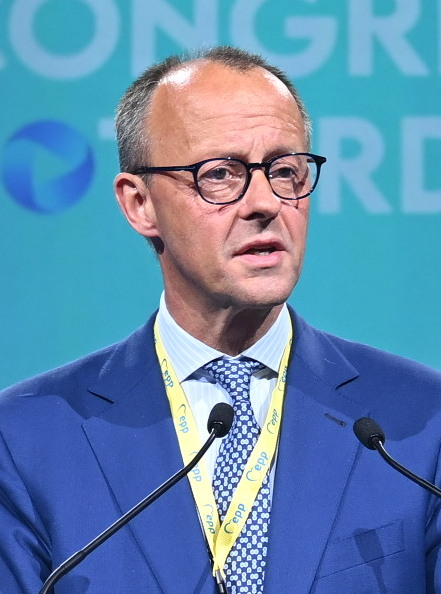

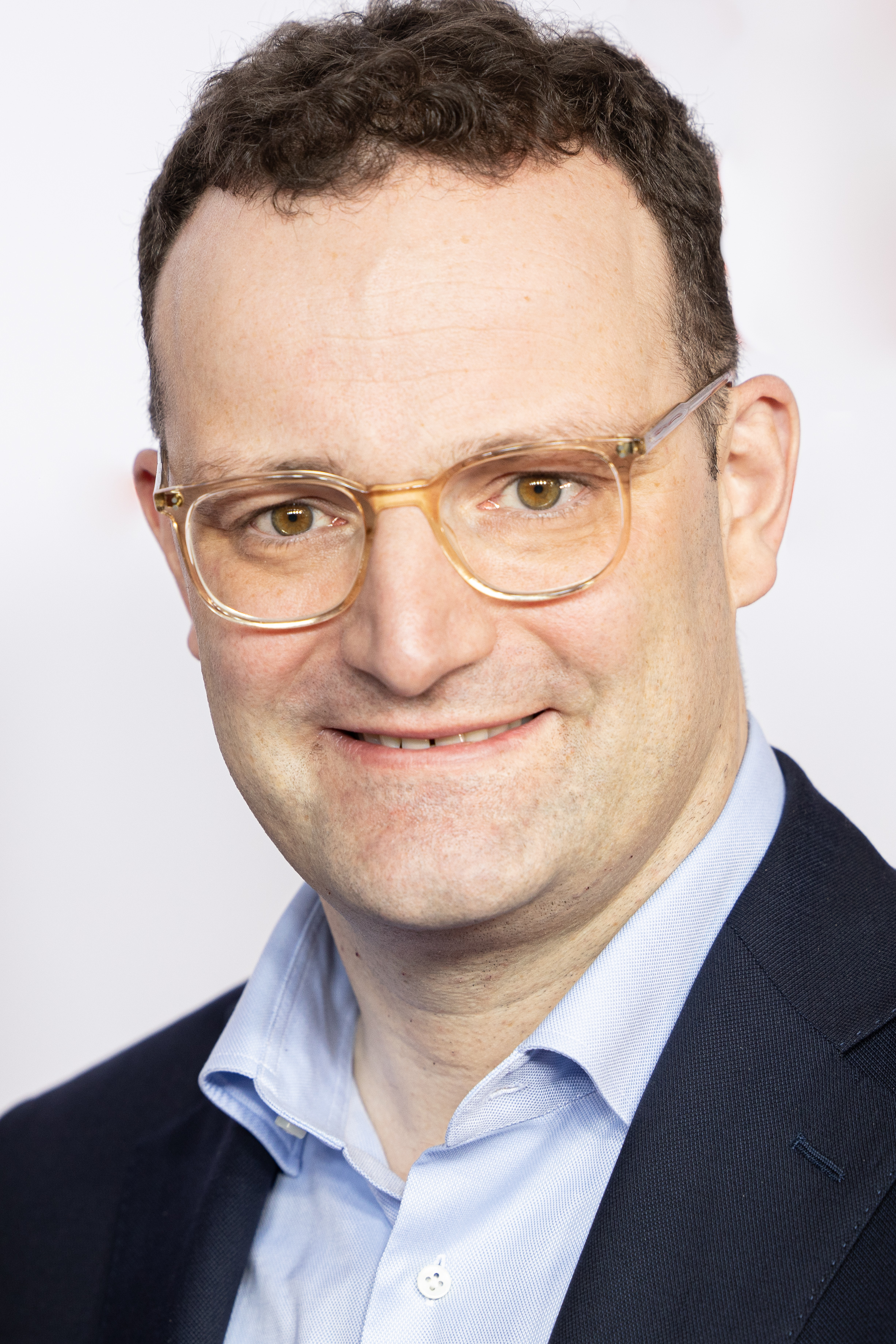
Candidate	Annegret Kramp-Karrenbauer	Friedrich Merz	Jens Spahn
First round	450, 45.05 %	392, 39.24 %	157, 15.72 %
Runoff	517, 51.75 %	482, 48.25 %	eliminated
Leader before election
Angela Merkel
Elected Leader
Annegret Kramp-Karrenbauer

The 2018 Christian Democratic Union leadership election took place during the party's 31st Congress in Hamburg at the Messehallen convention center on 7–8 December following Angela Merkel's decision in October 2018 not to stand for party leader at the 2018 party conference following the party's bad performance in the 2018 Hessian state election and the party's consistently low numbers in national polls.

In the subsequent party executive meeting on 29 October 2018, both the CDU's General Secretary Annegret Kramp-Karrenbauer and the Federal Minister of Health Jens Spahn announced their candidacy in the election. This was followed by Merkel's former arch-rival Friedrich Merz, who announced his bid and his return to politics on 30 October 2018. Spahn was eliminated after the first round, and Kramp-Karrenbauer subsequently won close-run second round of voting by 18 votes.

== Candidates ==
=== Declared ===
To be able to run as candidate for CDU leader, a person needs to be endorsed by a subdivision of the party (either the federal executive board or a state, district or local association) or the proposal by a delegate during the party convention.

==== Running ====
The following people ran in the leadership election, having fulfilled the criteria to become a candidate in the convention.

- Annegret Kramp-Karrenbauer — General Secretary of the CDU (2018), Minister-President of Saarland (2011–2018), Leader of the CDU Saar (2011–2018), Minister for Family and Social Affairs in Saarland (2009–2011), Minister for Education in Saarland (2007–2009), Minister for the Interior in Saarland (2000–2007), Member of Landtag of Saarland (1999–2018), Member of Bundestag (1998). Kramp-Karrenbauer was endorsed by the Saarland state association of the CDU.
- Friedrich Merz — Leader of the Opposition and Parliamentary Leader of the CDU (2000–2002), Member of Bundestag (1994–2009), Member of the European Parliament (1989–1994). Merz was endorsed by the local associations of Fulda and of Hochsauerland.
- Jens Spahn — Minister for Health (2018–2021), Parliamentary Secretary of State for Finance (2015–2018), Member of Bundestag (2002–present). Spahn was endorsed by the local association of Borken.

==== Announced ====
The following CDU politicians announced their intention to run for CDU leadership, but did not receive an endorsement by either a subdivision or a delegate.

- Jan-Philipp Knoop – commissioner for Social-Media in Tempelhof-Schöneberg
- Detlef Felix Hartmann – Candidate for the Leadership of the CDU Hamburg
- Jörg Paulusch – City councillor of Hirschbach
- Friedhelm Kölsch – Lord mayor candidate in Essen
- Andreas Ritzenhoff
- Norbert Stegner
- Christian Fleisinger
- Sabine Herrenbruch

=== Withdrew ===
The following politicians intended to run for the office, but withdrew their candidacy.

- Matthias Herdegen — Member of the Scientific Advisory Council on Biodiversity and Genetic Resources of the Federal Ministry of Food and Agriculture and Member of the Sixth Advisory Council of the Federal Academy for Security Policy
- Angela Merkel — Chancellor (2005–2021), Leader of the Opposition (2002–2005), CDU Leader (2000–today), General Secretary of the CDU (1998–2000), Federal Minister for Environment (1994–1998), Federal Minister for Youth and Women (1991–1994), Member of Bundestag (1990–today)

=== Declined ===
- Daniel Günther — Minister-President of Schleswig-Holstein (2017–today), Leader of the CDU Schleswig-Holstein (2016–today), Member of Landtag of Schleswig-Holstein (2009–today)
- Armin Laschet — Minister-President of North Rhine-Westfalia (2017–2021), Deputy Leader of the CDU (2012–2021), Leader of the CDU North Rhine-Westfalia (2012–201), Opposition Leader in North Rhine-Westfalia (2010–2017), Member of Landtag of North Rhine-Westfalia (2010–2021), Minister for Social Affairs in North-Rhine Westfalia (2005–2010), Member of European Parliament (1999–2005), Member of Bundestag (1994–1999)
- Ursula von der Leyen — Minister for Defence (2013–2019), Deputy Leader of the CDU (2009–2019), Minister for Social Affairs (2009–2013), Member of Bundestag (2009–2019), Minister for Family (2005–2009), Minister for Social Affairs in Lower Saxony (2003–2005), Member of Landtag of Lower Saxony (2003–2005)
- Julia Klöckner — Minister of Food and Agriculture (2018–2021), candidate for Minister-President of Rhineland-Palatinate in 2016 and 2011, Deputy Leader of the CDU (2012–2022), Opposition Leader in Rhineland-Palatinate (2011–2018), Member of Landtag of Rhineland-Palatinate (2011–2018), Leader of the CDU Rhineland-Palatinate (2010–2022), Member of Bundestag (2002–2011)
- Wolfgang Schäuble — President of Bundestag (2017–2023), Minister for Finances (2009–2017), Minister of the Interior (2005–2009, 1989–1991), Leader of the CDU (1998–2000), Parliamentary Leader of the CDU (1991–2000), Chief of the Chancellery (1984–1989), Member of Bundestag (1972–2023)

=== Endorsements ===
Annegret Kramp-Karrenbauer

Organizations and platforms

- CDU Saar, CDU state affiliate in Saarland
- Frauen-Union, women's wing of the CDU
- Senioren-Union, seniors wing of the CDU
- Christlich-Demokratische Arbeitnehmerschaft, self-designation is "CDU social committee"
- Mittelstands- und Wirtschaftsvereinigung Saarlands, entrepreneur, self-employment and freelancer wing of the CDU Saar
- Junge Union Saar, youth wing of the CDU Saar
- Union der Mitte, platform of centrist CDU politicians

Individuals

- Tobias Hans, Minister-President of Saarland
- Nadine Schön, Member of Bundestag and Deputy Parliamentary Leader
- Peter Weiß, Member of Bundestag
- Annette Widmann-Mauz, Member of Bundestag, Leader of the Frauen Union and Parliamentary Secretary for Migration
- Bernhard Vogel, former Minister-President of Rhineland-Palatinate and Thuringia and former President of the Bundesrat of Germany
- Katja Rathje-Hoffmann, Member of the Landtag of Schleswig-Holstein and state chairman of the Frauen-Union
- Kurt Biedenkopf, former Minister President of Saxony and former President of the Bundesrat
- Axel Müller, Member of Bundestag
- Thomas Heilmann, former Senator for Justice, consumer protection and anti-discrimination in Berlin and Member of Bundestag
- Jutta Schmitt-Lang, Member of Landtag of Saarland
- Daniel Günther, Minister President of Schleswig-Holstein, President of the Bundesrat of Germany and Leader of the CDU Schleswig-Holstein
- Thomas de Maizière, former Minister of the Interior and former Minister for Defense, Member of Bundestag
- Annette Schavan, former Minister of Education and Research and Minister of Education, Youth and Sports of Baden-Württemberg
- Christian Haase, Member of the Bundestag and leader of the Kommunalpolitische Vereinigung der CDU und CSU Deutschlands, the communal wing of the CDU
- Karl-Josef Laumann, Member of the Bundestag, Minister of Labor, Health and Social Affairs for North Rhine-Westphalia, Minister of Labor, Health and Social Affairs for North Rhine-Westphalia, Vice Chairman of CDU North Rhine-Westphalia and leader of the CDA
- Norbert Blüm, former Federal Minister for Social Affairs and Labour and former member of the Bundestag
- Peter Altmaier, Minister for Economic Affairs and Energy, Member of the Bundestag, former Parliamentary Secretary of State for the Interior, former Minister of the Environment, Nature Conservation, Building and Nuclear Safety, former Minister of Finance and former Head of the Chancellery
- Peter Tauber, Parliamentary Secretary of State for Defence, former Secretary General of the Christian Democratic Union and Member of the Bundestag
- Herbert Reul, former Member of the European Parliament and State Minister for Internal Affairs
- Ingo Senftleben, leader of CDU in Brandenburg
- Hermann Gröhe, Member of the Bundestag, former Minister of State at the Federal Chancellery and former Federal Minister of Health
- Annette Bonin, leader of the Frauen Union of Mönchengladbach
Friedrich Merz

Organizations and platforms

- Values Union (German: WerteUnion), platform of conservative CDU politicians
- Wirtschaftsrat der CDU, economic forum of the CDU
- Berliner Kreis in der Union, a platform of conservative CDU politicians
- Junge Union Rhein-Neckar-Kreis, youth wing of the CDU in Rhein-Neckar-Kreis
- Junge Union Baden-Württemberg, youth wing of the CDU Baden-Württemberg
- Junge Union Hessen, youth wing of the CDU Hessen
- CDU Altmarkkreis Salzwedel, CDU district affiliate in Altmarkkreis Salzwedel
- CDU Harz, CDU district affiliate in Harz
- CDU Hochsauerland, CDU district affiliate in Hochsauerland
- CDU Fulda, CDU district affiliate in Fulda
- Mittelstands- und Wirtschaftsvereinigung entrepreneur, self-employment and freelancer wing of the CDU
- Schüler Union Deutschlands, pupil wing of the CDU
- Initiative für Friedrich Merz
- Ring Christlich-Demokratischer Studenten Nordrhein-Westfalen, the student wing of the CDU Nordrhein-Westfalen

Individuals

- Wolfgang Bosbach, former Member of Bundestag
- Christian von Stetten, Member of Bundestag
- Wolfgang Schäuble, President of Bundestag, Member of Bundestag, former Minister for Finances, former Minister of the Interior, former Leader of the CDU, former Leader of the Opposition and of the CDU parliamentary group
- Sylvia Pantel, Member of Bundestag and Speaker of the Berliner Kreis in der Union
- Christean Wagner, former state secretary of the Federal Ministry of the Environment, Nature Conservation and Nuclear Safety, former Leader of the CDU parliamentary group in Hesse, former Education minister and Justice minister of Hesse and member of the Berliner Kreis
- Michael von Abercron, Member of Bundestag and former executive Director of the Wirtschaftsrat der CDU in Kiel
- Bertram Zitscher, executive Director of the Wirtschaftsrat der CDU in Schleswig-Holstein
- Roland Koch, former Minister-President of Hesse
- Hartmut Schauerte, former parliamentary state secretary of the Federal Ministry for Economic Affairs and Energy and former federal commissioner for the middle class
- Kurt Joachim Lauk, former Member of the European Parliament and former President of the Wirtschaftsrat der CDU
- Matthias Wissmann, former Member of Bundestag former Minister for Education and Research and former Minister for Transport
- Holger Kappel, state chairman of the WerteUnion in Baden-Württemberg
- Günther Oettinger, European Commissioner for Budget and Human Resources, former European Commissioner for Digital Economy and Society, former European Commissioner for Energy and former Minister-President of Baden-Württemberg
- Volker Rühe, former Federal Minister of Defence, former General Secretary of the CDU and former Member of Bundestag
- Jürgen Diener, chairman of the Mittelstands- und Wirtschaftsvereinigung in Fulda
- Fabian Tigges, Parliamentary Leader of the CDU in Iserlohn
- Karsten Meininghaus, Deputy Leader of the CDU in Iserlohn and leader of the CDU in Letmathe
- Ingo Gondro, Deputy Leader of the WerteUnion
- Markus Kurze, Member of the Landtag of Saxony-Anhalt and former state leader of the Junge Union
- Matthias Herdegen, Member of the Scientific Advisory Council on Biodiversity and Genetic Resources of the Federal Ministry of Food and Agriculture and Member of the Sixth Advisory Council of the Federal Academy for Security Policy
- Thomas Bareiß, Member of the Bundestag
- Petra Roth, former Lord mayor of Frankfurt, president of the Deutscher Städtetag and former Member of the Landtag of Hesse
- Christian von Stetten, Member of the Bundestag
- Wolfgang Reinhart, Minister for Federal, European and International Affairs in Baden-Württemberg, secretary of state in the ministry of finance Baden-württemberg and Parliamentary Leader of the CDU Baden-Württemberg
- Carsten Linnemann, Member of the Bundestag and president of the Mittelstands- und Wirtschaftsvereinigung
- Alexander Mitsch, leader of the Freiheitlich-konservativer Aufbruch
- Wolfgang Steiger, general secretary of the Wirtschaftsrat
- Frank Boss, member of the Landtag of North Rhine-Westphalia
- Jochen Klenner, member of the Landtag of North Rhine-Westphalia
Jens Spahn

Organizations and platforms

- CDU Borken, CDU district affiliate in Borken

Individuals

- Alexander Vogt, chairman of the Lesben und Schwule in der Union
- Philipp Amthor, Member of the Bundestag
- Günter Krings, former Parliamentary State Secretary at the Interior Federal Minister, former Deputy Chairman of the CDU / CSU parliamentary group for the areas of law, interior, sports and volunteer work, displaced persons, refugees and Aussiedler and Chairman of the CDU NRW regional group in the German Bundestag and leader of the Bundesarbeitskreis Christlich-Demokratischer Juristen, the jurist wing of the CDU.

== Opinion polling ==
Publication date	Poll source	Günther	Klöckner	Kramp-Karrenbauer	Laschet	von der Leyen	Merz	Spahn	None/ Others
7 Dec 2018	Forsa	—	—	41	—	—	28	5	26
6 Dec 2018	Infratest dimap	—	—	45	—	—	30	10	15
30 Nov 2018	Infratest dimap	—	—	39	—	—	26	9	26
23 Nov 2018	FGW	—	—	30	—	—	24	6	40
17 Nov 2018	Emnid	—	—	30	—	—	31	12	27
15 Nov 2018	Infratest dimap	—	—	43	—	—	32	10	15
11 Nov 2018	Emnid	—	—	32	—	—	30	9	29
9 Nov 2018	FGW	—	—	31	—	—	25	6	38
4 Nov 2018	Emnid	—	—	27	—	—	38	13	22
1 Nov 2018	YouGov	—	—	17	—	—	23	7	53
30 Oct 2018	Civey	6.4	2.4	19.2	6.2	2.1	33.7	6.2	23.8
30 Oct 2018	YouGov	—	—	18	6	—	21	6	49
30 Oct 2018	Forsa (Multiple choice)	—	—	46	28	—	45	22	

Among Delegates

Publication date	Poll source	Kramp-Karrenbauer	Merz	Spahn	None/ Others
1 Dec 2018	BILD	96	144	29	732 (42 either Kramp-K. or Merz)

Only Union/CDU Voters

Publication date	Poll source	Kramp-Karrenbauer	Laschet	Merz	Spahn	None/ Others
7 Dec 2018	Forsa	49	—	35	6	10
6 Dec 2018	Infratest dimap	47	—	37	12	4
30 Nov 2018	Infratest dimap	48	—	35	2	15
23 Nov 2018	FGW	38	—	29	6	27
17 Nov 2018	Emnid	32	—	49	7	12
15 Nov 2018	Infratest dimap	46	—	31	12	11
9 Nov 2018	FGW	35	—	33	7	25
4 Nov 2018	Emnid	39	—	44	9	8
30 Oct 2018	Forsa (Multiple choice)	62	36	53	29	

== Results ==
Candidate	First Round		Second Round	
Candidate	Votes	%	Votes	%
Annegret Kramp-Karrenbauer	450	45.05	517	51.75
Friedrich Merz	392	39.24	482	48.25
Jens Spahn	157	15.72		
Total valid votes	999	100.0	999	100.0
Invalid/blank votes	–	–	–	–
Total votes	999	100.0	999	100.0
Source: BR Welt

First Round
Kramp	45.05%
Merz	39.24%
Spahn	15.72%

Second Round
Kramp	51.75%
Merz	48.25%
