= Peter Nellen =

German politician (1912–1969)

Member of the Bundestag
- In office 7 September 1949 – 19 October 1969

Personal details
- Born: 10 August 1912 Düren, Rhine Province, Kingdom of Prussia, German Empire
- Died: 29 December 1969 (aged 56) Düren, North Rhine-Westphalia, West Germany
- Party: SPD (1960–69)
- Other political affiliations: CDU (1945–60)

Peter Nellen (10 August 1912 – 29 December 1969) was a German politician and member of the German Bundestag.

== Career ==
He was a member of the German Bundestag from its first election in 1949 to 1969. From 1949 to 1961 he represented the constituency of Münster-Stadt und -Land as a directly elected member.

== Literature ==
Herbst, Ludolf; Jahn, Bruno (2002). Vierhaus, Rudolf (ed.). Biographisches Handbuch der Mitglieder des Deutschen Bundestages. 1949–2002 [Biographical Handbook of the Members of the German Bundestag. 1949–2002] (in German). München: De Gruyter - De Gruyter Saur. p. 1715. ISBN 978-3-11-184511-1.
