= Stefan Nacke =

German politician

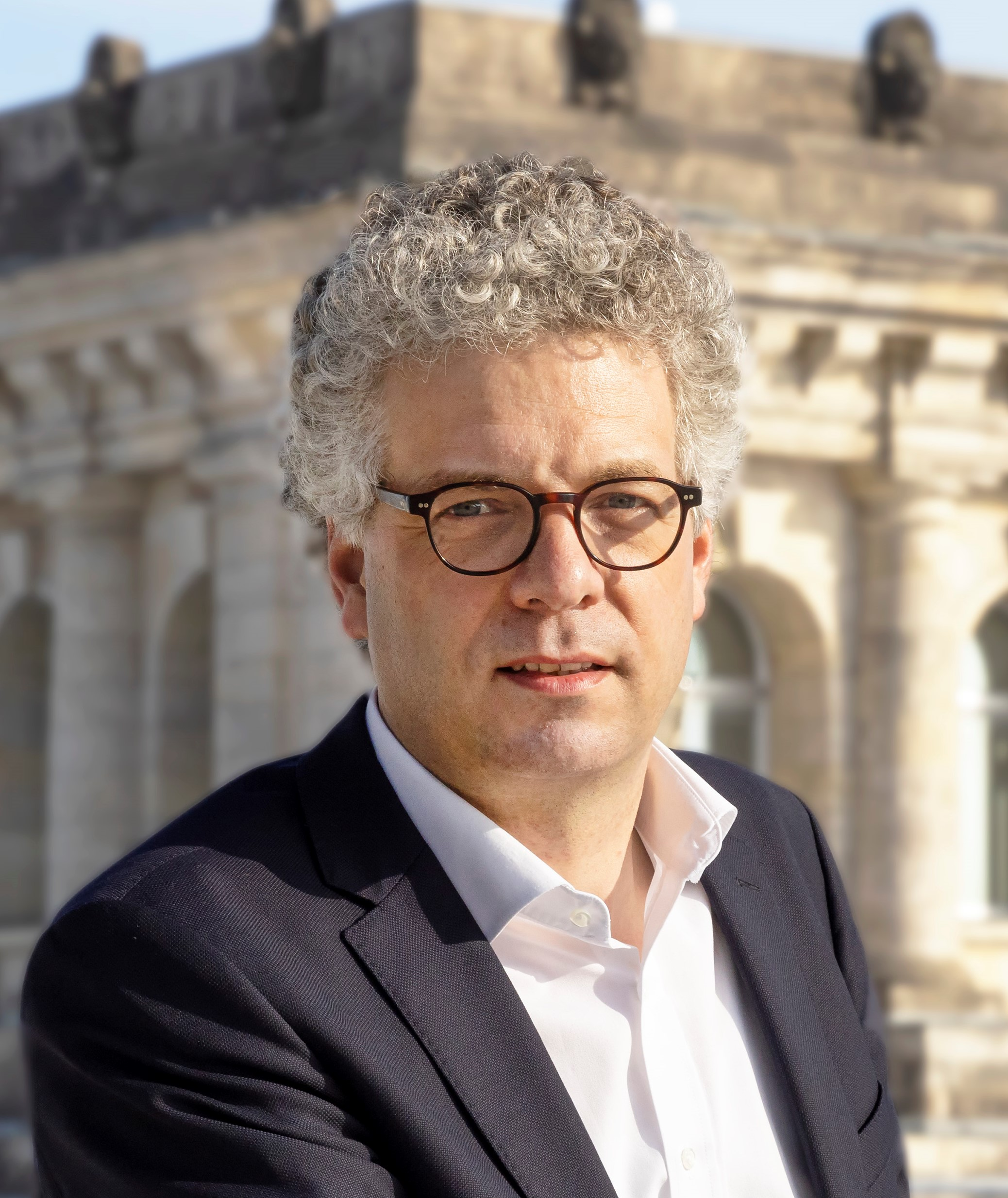

Member of the Bundestag
- Incumbent
- Assumed office 2021

Personal details
- Born: 24 January 1976 (age 50) Münster, West Germany (now Germany)
- Party: CDU
- Education: University of Münster; Bielefeld University

Stefan Nacke (born 24 January 1976) is a German sociologist and politician of the Christian Democratic Union (CDU) who has been serving as a member of the Bundestag since 2021.

== Early life and education ==
Nacke was born 1976 in the West German city of Münster and studied sociology.

== Political career ==
Nacke entered the CDU in 1998.

From the 2017 state elections, Nacke served as a member of the State Parliament of North Rhine-Westphalia. He was his parliamentary group’s spokesperson for science policy.

Nacke became a member of the Bundestag in the 2021 elections, representing the Münster district. In parliament, he has since been serving on the Committee on Labour and Social Affairs.

== Other activities ==
- Max Planck Institute for Molecular Biomedicine, Member of the Board of Trustees (since 2019)
- Rotary International, Member
