= Franz Berding =

German politician (1915–2010)

Member of the Bundestag
- In office 20 October 1969 – 22 September 1972

Personal details
- Born: 11 May 1915 Fürstenau
- Died: 16 February 2010 (aged 94) Münster, North Rhine-Westphalia, Germany
- Party: CDU

Franz Berding (11 May 1915 – 16 February 2010) was a German politician of the Christian Democratic Union (CDU) and former member of the German Bundestag.

== Political career ==
Berding joined the CDU as a member in 1946. He was mayor of the town of Ahaus from 1963 to 1964, where he was a member of the town council from 1952 to 1964 and chaired the CDU parliamentary group from 1956 to 1961.

From 1961 to 1964, Berding took over the office of Deputy District Administrator in what was then the district of Ahaus, of which he was a member of the district council from 1952 to 1967. He was also a member of the Regional Assembly of Westphalia-Lippe from 1964 to 1972.

From 1954 to 1969, Berding was a member of the state parliament of North Rhine-Westphalia. From 26 July to 8 December 1966, he was North Rhine-Westphalia's Minister for State Planning, Housing and Public Works in Meyer III's cabinet.

He was then a member of the German Bundestag from 1969 to 1972.

== Literature ==
Herbst, Ludolf; Jahn, Bruno (2002). Vierhaus, Rudolf (ed.). Biographisches Handbuch der Mitglieder des Deutschen Bundestages. 1949–2002 [Biographical Handbook of the Members of the German Bundestag. 1949–2002] (in German). München: De Gruyter - De Gruyter Saur. p. 1715. ISBN 978-3-11-184511-1.
