= Hermann Diebäcker =

German politician (1910–1982)

Member of the Bundestag
- In office 15 October 1957 – 19 October 1969

Personal details
- Born: 14 August 1910 Münster
- Died: 16 April 1982 (aged 71) Münster, North Rhine-Westphalia, Germany
- Party: CDU

Hermann Diebäcker (14 August 1910 – 16 April 1982) was a German politician of the Christian Democratic Union (CDU) and former member of the German Bundestag.

== Politics ==
Diebäcker was a member of the German Bundestag from 1957 to 1969. He represented the constituency of Münster in parliament.
