= Kurze, Palghar =

Village in Maharashtra

Kurze
- village
- Location in Maharashtra, India Kurze (India)
- Coordinates: 20.1110426°N 72.9519622°E
- Country: India
- State: Maharashtra
- District: Palghar
- Taluka: Talasari
- Elevation: 64 m (210 ft)

Population (2011)
  - Total: 5,546
- Time zone: UTC+5:30 (IST)
- 2011 census code: 551572

Kurze is a village in the Palghar district of Maharashtra, India. It is located in the Talasari taluka.

== Demographics ==
According to the 2011 census of India, Kurze has 997 households. The effective literacy rate (i.e. the literacy rate of population excluding children aged 6 and below) is 55.48%.

Demographics (2011 Census)
	Total	Male	Female
Population	5546	2664	2882
Children aged below 6 years	890	432	458
Scheduled caste	102	46	56
Scheduled tribe	5398	2590	2808
Literates	2583	1562	1021
Workers (all)	2372	1282	1090
Main workers (total)	1632	981	651
Main workers: Cultivators	374	214	160
Main workers: Agricultural labourers	736	388	348
Main workers: Household industry workers	22	14	8
Main workers: Other	500	365	135
Marginal workers (total)	740	301	439
Marginal workers: Cultivators	215	48	167
Marginal workers: Agricultural labourers	313	104	209
Marginal workers: Household industry workers	9	3	6
Marginal workers: Others	203	146	57
Non-workers	3174	1382	1792
