= Sylvia Rietenberg =

German politician (born 1965)

Member of the Bundestag
- Incumbent
- Assumed office 2025

Personal details
- Born: 20 July 1965 (age 60)
- Party: Alliance 90/The Greens

Sylvia Rietenberg (July 20, 1965 in Wanne-Eickel) is a German politician belonging to the Alliance 90/The Greens. In the 2025 German federal election, she was elected to the German Bundestag.

== Offial website ==
- Official website by Sylvia Rietenberg
