= Jochen Klenner =

German politician (born 1978)

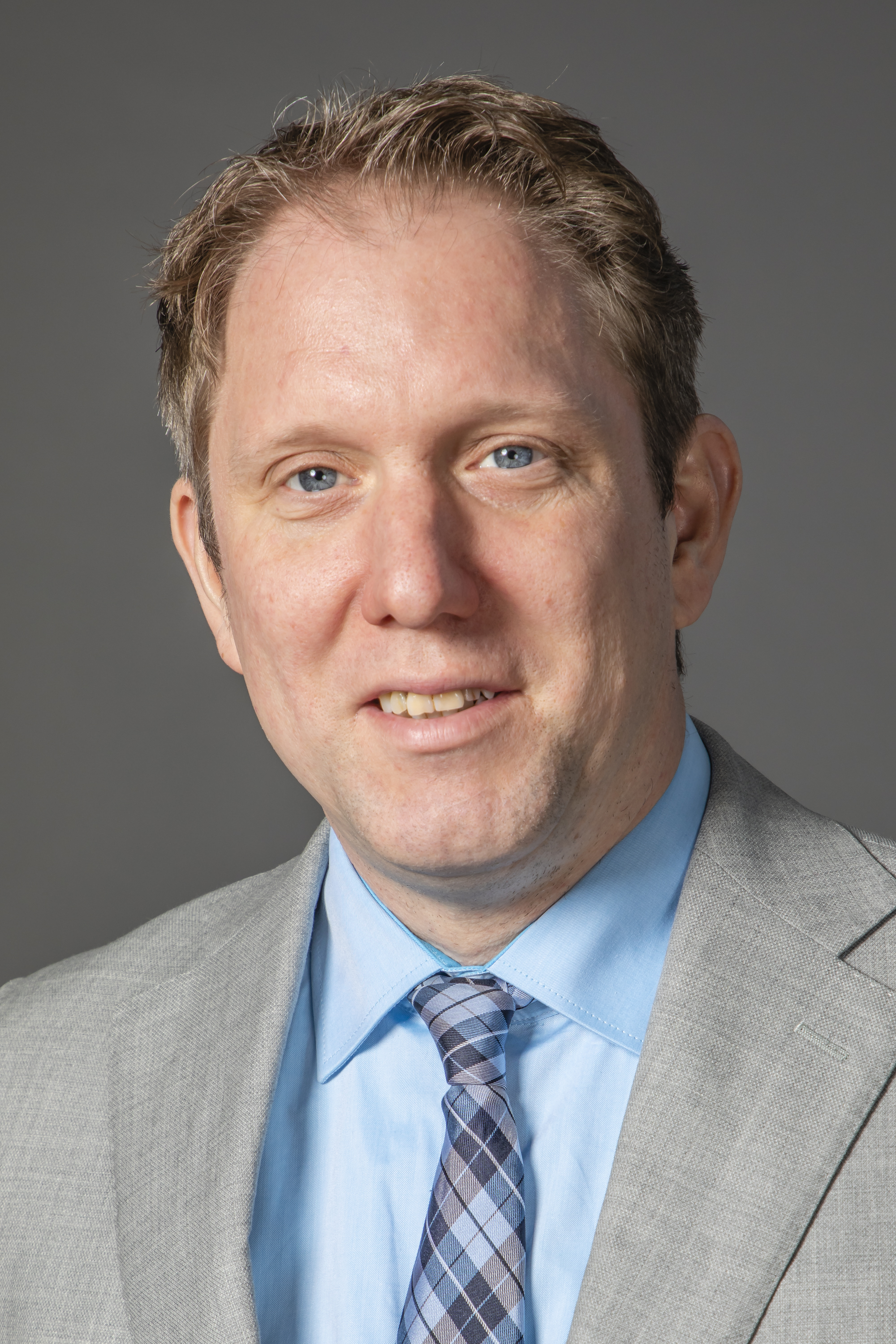
- Klenner in 2019

Member of the Landtag of North Rhine-Westphalia
- Incumbent
- Assumed office 1 June 2017
- Preceded by: Norbert Post
- Constituency: Mönchengladbach II

Personal details
- Born: 27 October 1978 (age 47) Neuss
- Party: Christian Democratic Union (since 2004)

Jochen Klenner (born 27 October 1978 in Neuss) is a German politician serving as a member of the Landtag of North Rhine-Westphalia since 2017. He has served as chairman of the Christian Democratic Union in Mönchengladbach since 2021.
