= Rezo =

German YouTuber and Twitch streamer

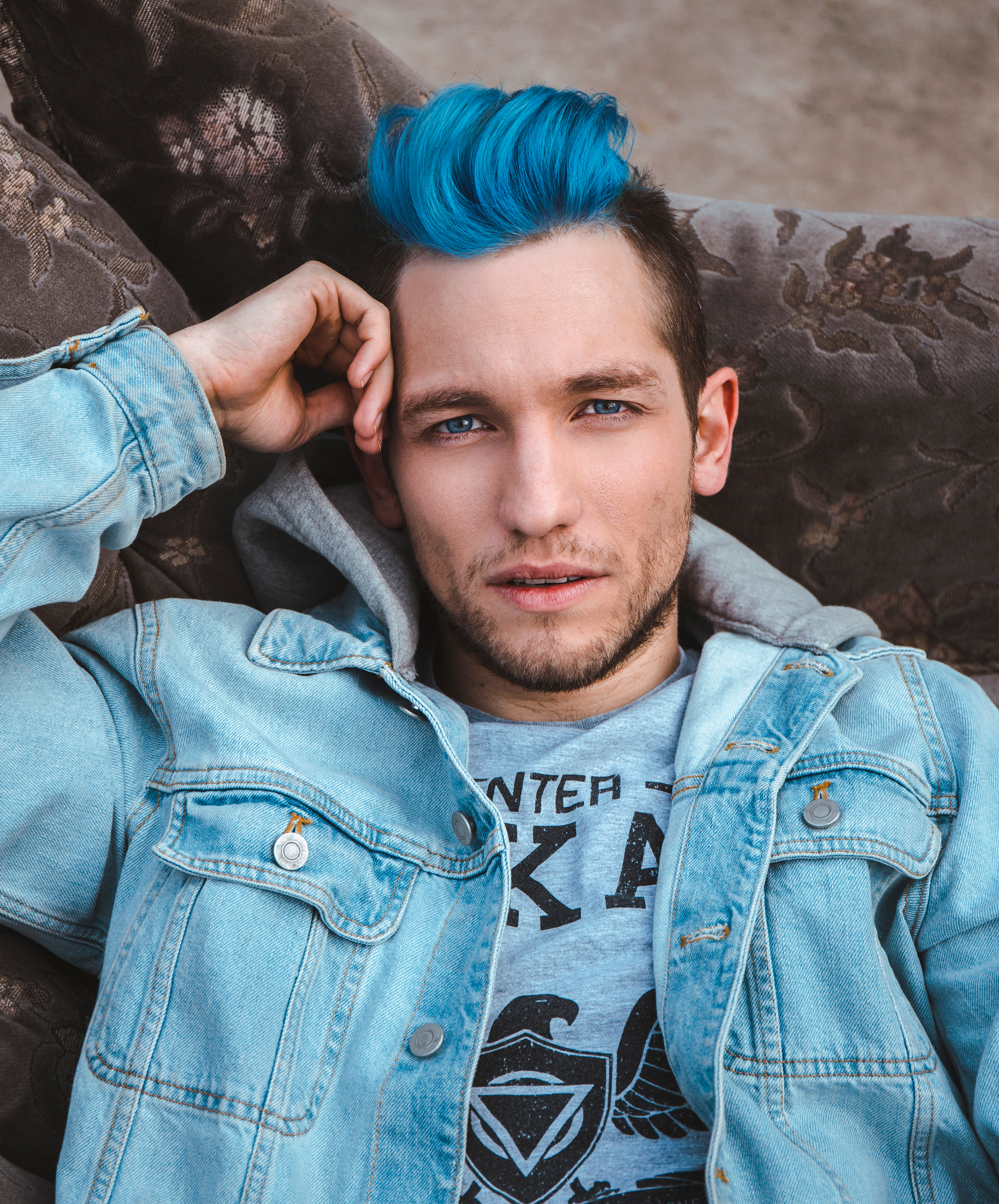
- Rezo in 2019
- Born: 14 August 1992 (age 34); Wuppertal, Germany
- Education: Technical University of Dortmund

YouTube information
- Channels: Rezo (inactive); Rezo ja lol ey (inactive); Renzo; Schlumpf
- Years active: 2015–present
- Genres: Music; comedy; vlog
- Subscribers: 1.72 million (rezo); 1.63 million (Rezo ja lol ey); 1.23 million (Renzo); 606 thousand (Schlumpf)
- Views: 195 million (rezo); 402 million (Rezo ja lol ey); 361 million (Renzo); 201 million (Schlumpf)
- Last updated: May 11, 2025

Rezo [ˈɹiːzo] is a German content creator, podcaster, musician and entrepreneur. In addition to his YouTube presence and entrepreneurial activities, he has appeared on entertainment television and contributed his own topical column to Zeit Online from 2019 to 2020. His video Die Zerstörung der CDU (The Destruction of the CDU), in which he criticized the CDU/CSU shortly before the 2019 European elections, particularly for their climate policy, gained a lot of attention and sparked a political debate. The outcome of the election and the decision of many young voters to vote against the Union parties was linked to the impact of the video, for which the term ‘Rezo effect’ became established.

Rezo also runs a podcast with Julien Bam called Hobbylos.

== Early life and education ==
Rezo was born in Wuppertal on 14 August 1992 and grew up in a pastor's family. His parents are Protestant ministers, as are several of his relatives. He was bullied during his school years and underwent psychological treatment for a short time. Music provided him with an escape, and he inherited his musical talent from his father. From the age of 14 until one and a half years before his master's degree, he played in various bands. He plays the guitar.

According to his own information, Rezo studied computer science at the Technical University of Dortmund and had taken music as a minor subject. From 2015 onwards, he was supported by the Dortmund Model SME Scholarship, which is funded by medium-sized companies. He obtained his bachelor's degree in 2013 and his Master of Science in 2016 with a thesis in the field of graph theory.

Since Rezo says he is vegan and does not use intoxicants such as nicotine and cannabis, he has been classified as straight edge. He also publicly advocates for veganism.

Although he does not describe himself as Christian, he says he has internalised Christian values. He attributes his eloquence to his upbringing, as there was always a lively culture of discussion at the dinner table at home. However, he sometimes stutters, which makes him uncomfortable in live situations such as panel discussions.

Rezo does not reveal his real name in public and currently resides in Aachen.

A distinguishing feature is his blue-colored hair.

== Career ==
Since September 2012, Rezo has had his own channel on YouTube, with almost 1.75 million users as of 2019 which is mostly about music, including his own performances, as covers, mashups or remixes. On his second channel Rezo ja lol ey, he usually jokes and converses with other YouTubers about line-ups, bizarre chat messages or hate comments.

In 2018, he created an ensemble cast music video of Hall of Fame (song) with 100 YouTube creators to celebrate having reached a million subscribers.

On 18 May 2019, one week before the 2019 European Parliament election, Rezo published under his second YouTube channel Rezo ja lol ey a 54-minute video named "Die Zerstörung der CDU", which literally means "The destruction of/by the CDU", in which he said that essential political positions, especially of the parties CDU/CSU and SPD, are destroying "our lives and our future". The 55-minute video, with a list of 247 references and citations of scientific literature, accused the governing conservative alliance for a range of unsustainable policies such as inactivity in politics of global warming, making politics for the rich, war and internet censorship. He explicitly warned against voting for the right-wing populist AfD, as they would "only make the world worse". Towards the end, he stated: "You always say that young people should be political, in which case you have to get to grips with it when they think your politics are shit". His video went viral, receiving more than 13 million views within the first eleven days and triggered a broad social debate. On 24 May 2019, two days ahead of the vote, Rezo was joined by more than 90 known bloggers in a three-minute followup video entitled A Statement of 90+ Youtubers which summarized the statements of the first video. They asked voters not to back Angela Merkel's bloc or the SPD, because of their politics of global warming.

In May 2019, after the EU election the leader of the CDU, Merkel's successor Annegret Kramp-Karrenbauer announced she wanted to "regulate" political opinion in election campaigns. This was met with a wide political backlash. Bundestag Vice President Claudia Roth stated: "For years, the Union (CDU/CSU) has said that populist-right-wing discourse shifting, sometimes even national-right-wing agitation should not be approached too hard." As soon as a blogger expressed himself critically, "[Kramp-Karrenbauer] fabulates about the restriction of freedom of expression in the election campaign, one can only hope that it is rooted in helplessness and not in political conviction." In spite of the backlash, Kramp-Karrenbauer put the item "asymmetrical campaigning" on the agenda for a meeting of her party leadership on 2 July 2019.

In September 2019, Rezo won a Goldene Kamera Digital Award as a special jury prize.

After the Halle synagogue shooting in October 2019, Rezo took to Twitter to criticise German interior minister Horst Seehofer for suggesting increased surveillance of the country's gaming community. Rezo accused Seehofer and the CSU of incompetent leadership.

He also made videos on the "climate crisis", denouncing for instance the doubts on the scientific consensus publicly expressed by one of the EU Parliament's vice-presidents, Nicola Beer.
