= Markus Kurze =

German politician (born 1970)

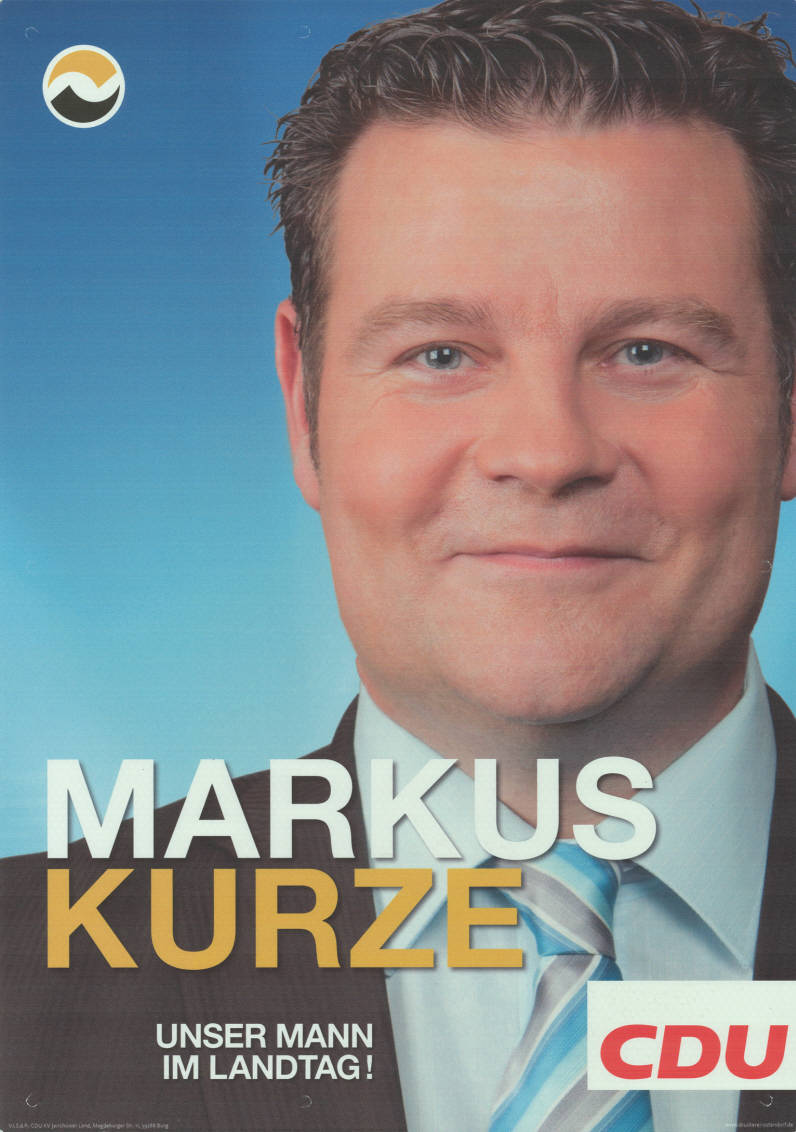
- Kurze in 2011

Member of the Landtag of Saxony-Anhalt
- Incumbent
- Assumed office 16 May 2002
- Preceded by: Uwe Nehler
- Constituency: Burg

Personal details
- Born: 24 December 1970 (age 55)
- Party: Christian Democratic Union (since 1993)

Markus Kurze (born 24 December 1970) is a German politician serving as a member of the Landtag of Saxony-Anhalt, since 2002. He has served as chief whip of the Christian Democratic Union since 2016.
