= Hubertus Zdebel =

German politician

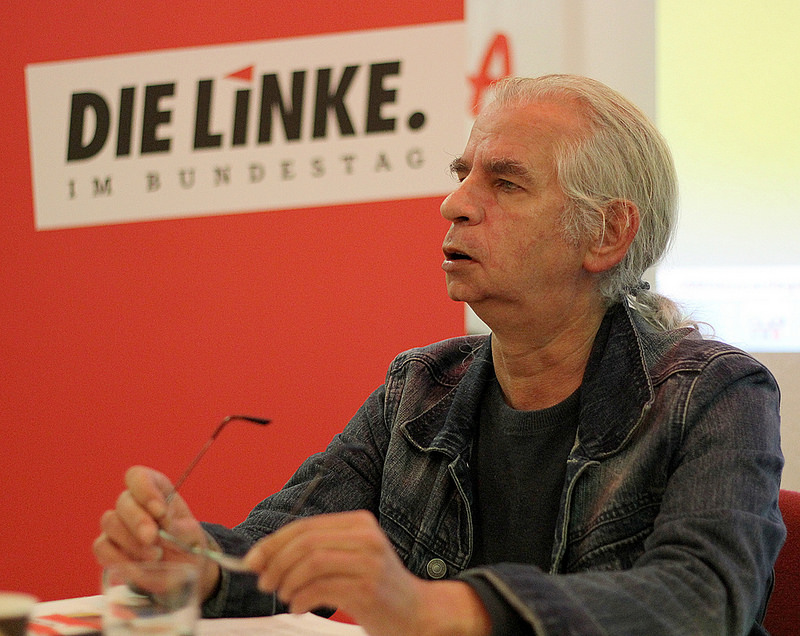
- Hubertus Zdebel in 2014

Member of the Bundestag
- Incumbent
- Assumed office 2013

Personal details
- Born: 22 October 1954 (age 71) Emmerich, West Germany (now Germany)
- Party: The Left

Hubertus Zdebel (born 22 October 1954) is a German politician. Born in Emmerich, North Rhine-Westphalia, he represents The Left. Hubertus Zdebel has served as a member of the Bundestag from the state of North Rhine-Westphalia since 2017.

== Life ==
Zdebel studied sociology, political science, journalism and Dutch language in Münster and Nijmegen without graduating. During his studies he was engaged as a university lecturer in the AStA of the University of Münster. In the 1980s and 1990s he worked as a journalist in Münster. Later he was office manager of the member of the state parliament Rüdiger Sagel. He became member of the bundestag after the 2013 German federal election. He is a member of the Committee for Environment, Nature Conservation and Nuclear Safety and the Finance Committee. In April 2021, Zdebel got no safe place on party list for 2021 German federal election.
