= The destruction of the CDU =

German YouTube video

The destruction of the CDU (German: Die Zerstörung der CDU) is the title of a video released on May 18, 2019, in the run-up to the 2019 European elections by the German YouTuber Rezo on YouTube. The video is 55 minutes long and accompanied by a 13-page source list. It was viewed over ten million times in a week after airing.

== Beforehand ==
Months before the initial broadcast, on February 13, 2019, Rezo tweeted the earliest hint to the video: "How come no one has made a thorough destruction video against the CDU yet? Around 41 minutes long or so" – the 41 minutes are a reference to a similarly styled and instrumentalized criticism video released by Rezo in January 2019.

== Content ==
In the video he criticized the current German government parties (the CDU, the CSU, the SPD), the AfD, and the FDP.

He accuses the Union parties, in particular, of contributing to the ever-widening gap between rich and poor in Germany, climate change, "advancing with and support the US unquestioningly in their armed conflicts".

He also commented on the topics of education, copyright and drug policy.

At the end of the video he provides an indirect recommendation to vote for Alliance 90/The Greens and Die Linke. His video also shows Volt Europa, DiEM25 and ÖkoLinX as other voting options. The instrumental tracks used in the video, and other videos of a similar style, are "Drowned Night" by "Max Anson" in the introduction, "This Means War" by "DJ Denz the Rooster" in the chapter transitions, "The Postman" by Kikoru, "Visions" by Cushy, "Big Body" and "Deus Ex Machina" Ballpoint, "Little did we know" and "Gossip talk" and "It's not me" by Arthur Benson, and "Life in color" by Philip Ayers. Some similarly styled videos by Rezo also feature the track "Scarily Similar" by Alfie-Jay Winters.

== Resonance ==
The video, which was accessed millions of times within days, attracted international media interest and was part of the social debate. It was the most watched German YouTube video in 2019.

== Follow-up ==
On May 24, 2019, Rezo released another video titled A Statement of 70+ Youtubers (German: Ein Statement von 70+ Youtubern, later, A Statement from 90+ Youtubers, Ein Statement von 90+ Youtubern) in which they express their support for Rezo's concerns and "[therefore ask all]: Do not vote for the CDU/CSU, do not vote for the SPD. Do not vote for any other party that does so little in the sense of logic and science, and destroys our future according to scientific consensus. And certainly not the AfD who even denies this consensus".
