= Maria Klein-Schmeink =

German politician (born 1958)

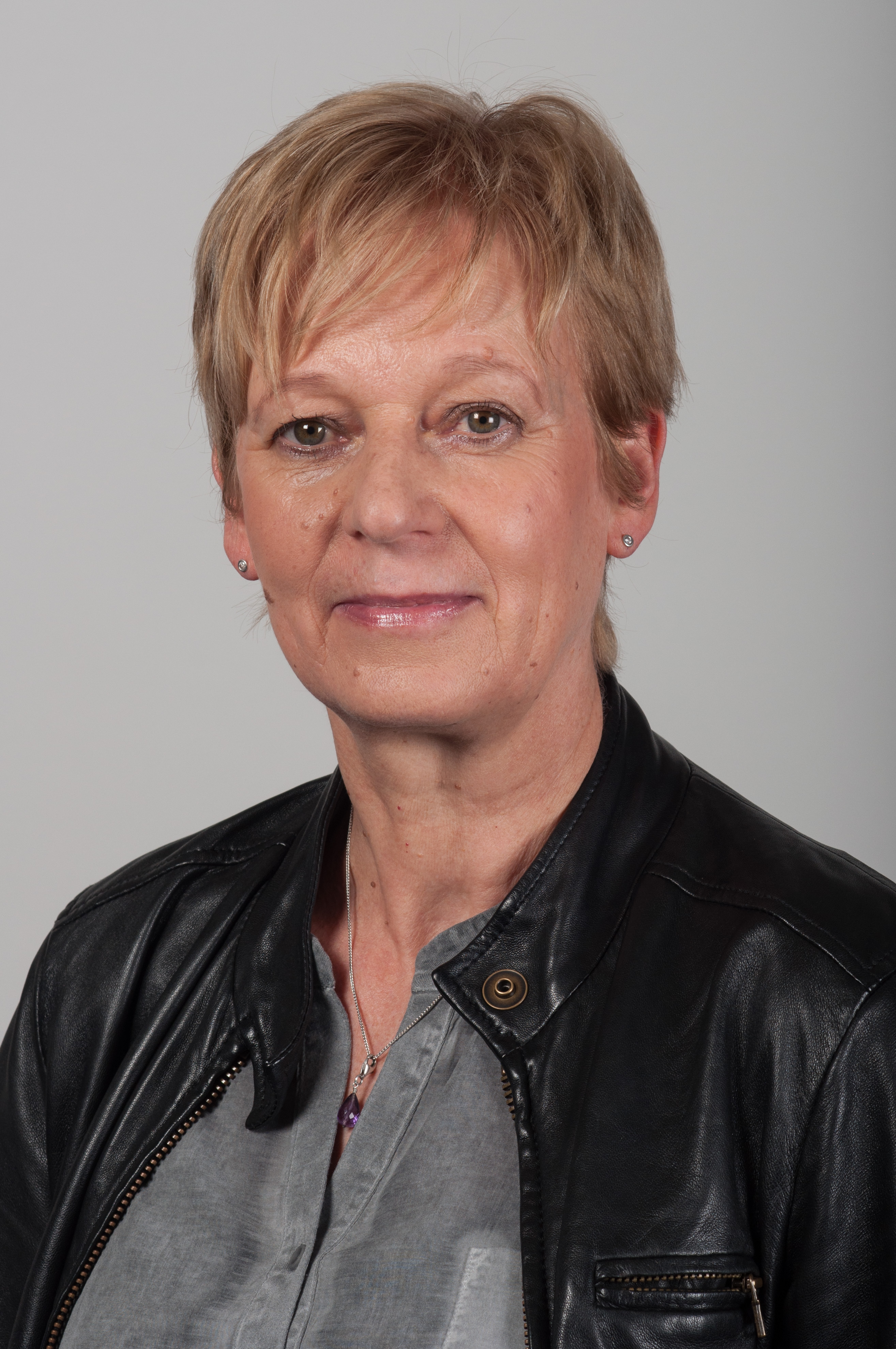
- Klein-Schmeink in 2014

Member of the Bundestag
- In office 2009–2025

Personal details
- Born: 6 January 1958 (age 68) Hamminkeln, West Germany (now Germany)
- Party: Greens
- Children: 1
- Education: University of Münster

Maria Anna Klein-Schmeink (born 6 January 1958) is a German politician of Alliance 90/The Greens who served as a member of the Bundestag from the state of North Rhine-Westphalia from 2009 to 2025.

== Early life and career ==
Klein-Schmeink studied sociology at the University of Münster from 1977 to 1984 and graduated with a master's degree. While still a student, she began working as a volunteer for the Sozialpädagogisches Bildungswerk Münster (Sobi).

After completing her studies until 2002, Klein-Schmeink worked full-time in a leading position for the Sobi. From 1986 to 1988 she was involved in the establishment of the institution "cultur- und begegnungszentrum achtermannstraße" (c.u.b.a.). From 2002 until she moved to the German Bundestag in 2009, she worked as a legislative advisor to the Green Party's group in the State Parliament of North Rhine-Westphalia.

== Political career ==
In parliament, Klein-Schmeink was a member of the Committee on Health. From 2014, she served as her parliamentary group's spokesperson on health policy. In 2020, she succeeded Katja Dörner as one her parliamentary group's deputy chairs, first under the leadership of co-chairs Katrin Göring-Eckardt and Anton Hofreiter, then Britta Hasselmann and Katharina Dröge.

In addition to her committee assignments, Klein-Schmeink was part of the German-Austrian Parliamentary Friendship Group.

In the negotiations to form a so-called traffic light coalition of the Social Democrats (SPD), the Green Party and the FDP following the 2021 federal elections, Klein-Schmeink led her party's delegation in the working group on health policy; her co-chairs from the other parties were Katja Pähle and Christine Aschenberg-Dugnus.

In the negotiations to form a coalition government under the leadership of Minister-President of North Rhine-Westphalia Hendrik Wüst following the 2022 state elections, Klein-Schmeink was part of her party’s delegation.

In March 2024, Klein-Schmeink announced that she would not stand in the 2025 federal elections but instead resign from active politics by the end of the parliamentary term.
