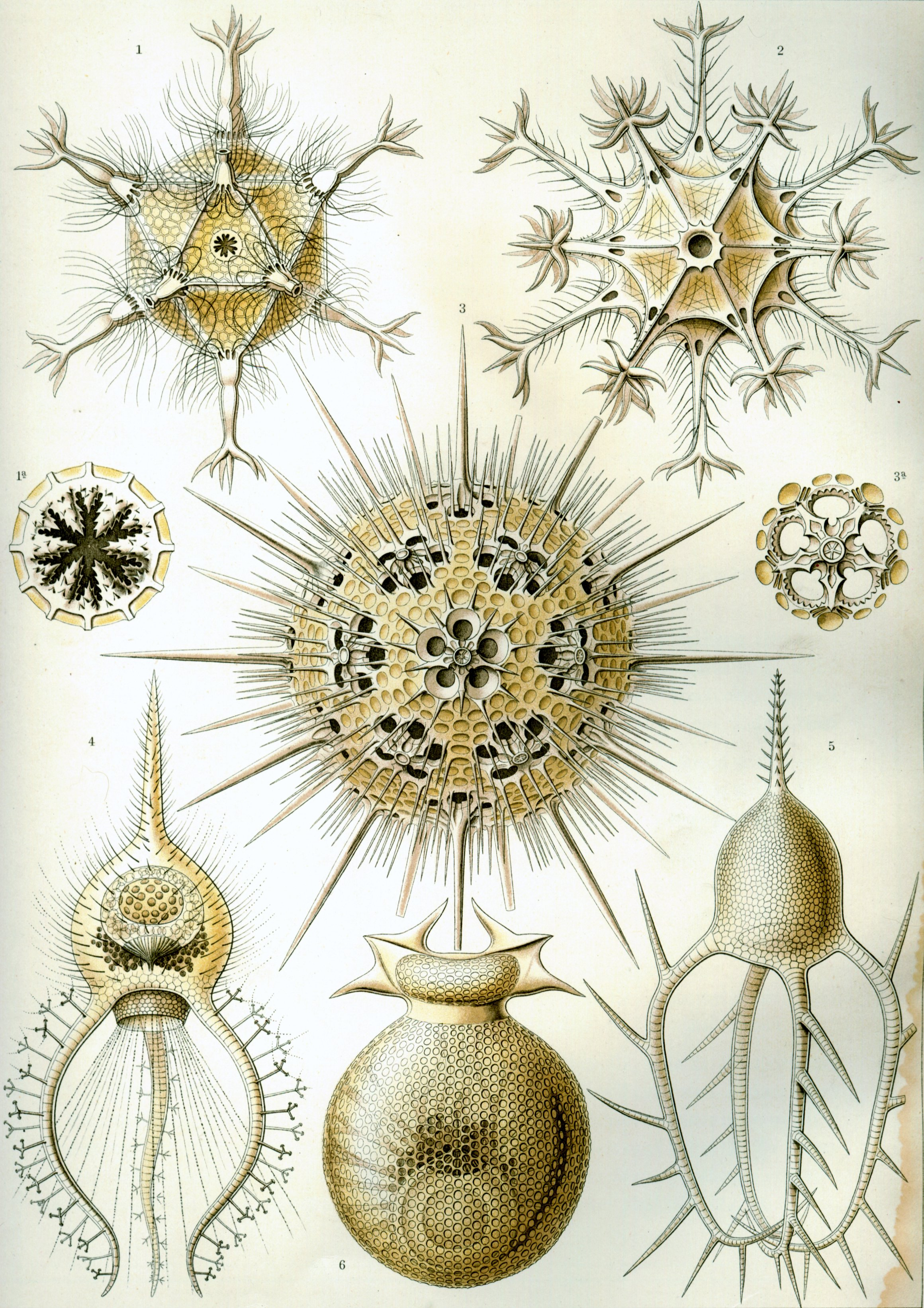
- "Phaeodaria" from Ernst Haeckel's Kunstformen der Natur, 1904

Scientific classification
- Domain: Eukaryota
- Clade: Sar
- Clade: Rhizaria
- Phylum: Cercozoa
- Subphylum: Filosa
- Class: Thecofilosea
- Subclass: Phaeodaria; Haeckel 1879 stat. n. Cavalier-Smith in Howe et al. 2011

Orders
- Phaeogymnocellida; "Phaeocystida"; Phaeocalpida; Phaeoconchida; Phaeodendrida; "Phaeogromida"; Phaeosphaerida

Diversity
- 400-500 species

Synonyms
- Phaeodarea Haeckel 1879; Tripylea Hertwig 1879

= Phaeodaria =

Subclass of protists

Phaeodaria is a group of amoeboid cercozoan organisms. They are traditionally considered radiolarians, but in molecular trees do not appear to be close relatives of the other groups, and are instead placed among the Cercozoa. They are distinguished by the structure of their central capsule and by the presence of a phaeodium, an aggregate of waste particles within the cell.

The term "Radiozoa" has been used to refer to radiolaria when Phaeodaria is explicitly excluded.

Phaeodaria produce hollow skeletons composed of amorphous silica and organic material, which rarely fossilize. The endoplasm is divided by a cape with three openings, of which one gives rise to feeding pseudopods, and the others let through bundles of microtubules that support the axopods. Unlike true radiolarians, there are no cross-bridges between them. They also lack symbiotic algae, generally living below the photic zone, and do not produce any strontium sulfate.

== Characteristics ==
=== Cell structure ===
Phaeodaria are unicellular protists that grow a capsule with a thick, double-layered wall containing two kinds of pores or openings: the large type, known as "astropylum" or oral pore, from which a massive strand of cytoplasm protrudes; and the smaller type, known as "parapylae" or lateral pores, from which thinner strands of cytoplasm protrude. External to the capsule there is a large, often darkly pigmented, mass of granular cytoplasm called "phaeodium" which contains undigested or partially digested food or debris. Their mitochondrial cristae are tubular.

Most Phaeodaria have a siliceous skeleton composed of amorphous silica joined by organic matter. They may contain more organic matter than Polycystinea (Radiolaria). Skeletons of some species are composed of hollow bars, instead of solid rods as in Polycystinea. Others have ornate spicules scattered through the external cytoplasm in a variety of forms, including geodesic frameworks, spheres or polyhedra. Other species have porous shells that are either bivalved, resembling clams, or vase-like with ornamentations around the opening. Other species have highly branched antler-llike spines stemming from a central shell. Unlike Polycystinea, the capsular wall surrounding the denser endoplasm of Phaeodaria lacks fusules.

Their cell size ranges from hundreds of micrometres to a few millimetres, roughly depending on the family. For example, species of Tuscaroridae exceed 3 mm, while Challengeridae are generally smaller than a few hundred μm. Some phaeodarians with spherical skeletons are similar to Polycystinea and Acantharea (Radiolaria), although they are more porous and fragile. Some species of the family Challengeridae resemble marine dinoflagellates, but can be correctly distinguished by the presence of a phaeodium and absence of grooves.

=== Nutrition ===
The continuous, massive strand of cytoplasm in the astropyle of Phaeodaria provides a pathway to carry digested prey matter into the endoplasm, similarly to some testate amoebae and foraminifera. Among the limited evidence of phaeodarian predation, it was reported in 1986 that a mesopelagic phaeodarian had absorbed microflagellate and metazoan prey. When introduced in the laboratory cultures, copepods and salps also were snared by phaeodaria.

=== Reproduction ===
Sexual reproduction of Phaeodaria has not been confirmed, but the release of motile swarmers that are likely gametes is widely documented. In the species Coelodendrum ramosissimum, dispersal starts with the disappearance of the phaeodium, followed by the dissolution of the capsule and the creation of small plasmodial spheres in the ectoplasm; each of the spheres produces hundreds of multinucleated amoebae that eventually form swarmers with two undulipodia (flagella).

== Ecology ==
Phaeodaria are exclusively marine, holoplanktonic unicellular protists that play an important role in marine ecosystems. They are heterotrophic plankton (zooplankton) that chiefly live in pelagic open oceans, from the surface to the deep sea. They have not been reported from brackish and high-salinity environments, but they are present in all oceans.

Very little is known about their role in the trophic web and about their predators. Dinoflagellate necrotrophs are reported to infect species of Phaeodaria, such as Syndinium nucleophaga.

== Systematics ==
=== History ===
As a protist group often broken by normal sampling methods and not very abundant in comparison with other organisms in the euphotic zone, Phaeodaria have attracted little attention from plankton researchers. The majority of taxonomic and ecological information regarding Phaeodaria, studied by German scientists, ended after World War I, and it has been little updated until today. Because of the presence of an organic central capsule and "ray-like pseudopodia", Phaeodaria were historically regarded as Radiolaria, along with Polycystinea and Acantharea. The marine Radiolaria were, along with the freshwater Heliozoa, assigned to the phylum Actinopoda due to their elaborate siliceous skeletons surrounding the central capsule with pores from which axopodia emerge.

Through molecular phylogenetics, Actinopoda was rendered invalid due to being polyphyletic, not a natural group. Phaeodaria are now classified as a subclass of the phylum Cercozoa, while the ecologically different "true" Radiolaria belong to the related phylum Retaria, both within the higher Rhizaria supergroup. The following cladogram shows the phylogenetic position of all groups of "Actinopoda" (highlighted).

- Diaphoretickes
  - SAR
    - Stramenopiles
      - Actinophryida
      - other stramenopiles
    - Alveolata
    - Rhizaria
      - Cercozoa
        - - Phaeodaria
          - core Cercozoa
        - Desmothoracida
      - Retaria
        - Foraminifera
        - Radiolaria
          - - Acantharea
            - Taxopodida
          - Polycystinea
  - Haptista
    - Haptophyta
    - Centroplasthelida
  - Cryptista
  - Archaeplastida

=== Phylogeny ===
Through phylogenetic analyses it has been discovered that Phaeodaria is a monophyletic clade, but the historical orders and families comprising it aren't. Instead, the clade consists of 11 subclades defined by morphological and phylogenetic values that do not correspond with the traditional orders and families:

- - - - - - clade A
          - clade B
        - - clade C
          - - clade D
            - clade E
      - clade F
    - - clade G
      - clade H
  - clade I
  - - clade J
    - clade K

=== Modern classification ===
The modern classification is the following, with the subclass containing a total of 2 orders, 16 families and 39 genera.

- Order Phaeogymnocellida Cachon & Cachon 1985
  - Family Phaeosphaeridae Cachon-Enjumet 1961 – Phaeopyla, Phaeodactylis, Phaeosphaera
  - Family Phaeodinidae Cachon-Enjumet 1961 – Phaeodina
  - Family Atlanticellidae Cachon-Enjumet 1961 – Gymnocelia, Halocelia, Lobocelia, Miracelia, Planktonetta
- Order Phaeocystida Haeckel 1887
  - Family Aulacanthidae Haeckel 1887 – Aulacantha
  - Family Astracanthidae Haeckel 1887 – Astracantha, Castanella, Castanissa
- Order Phaeosphaerida Haeckel 1887
  - Family Aulosphaeridae Haeckel 1887 – Aulosphaera, Aularia, Aulotractus
  - Family Cannosphaeridae Haeckel 1887 – Coelocantha
  - Family Sagosphaeridae Haeckel 1887 – Sagenoarium, Sagenoscena, Sagoscena
- Order Phaeocalpida Haeckel 1887
  - Family Castanellidae Haecker 1906 – Castanea
  - Family Circoporidae Haeckel 1887 – Circoporus, Circospathis, Haeckeliana
  - Family Tuscaroridae Haeckel 1887 – Tuscarora, Tuscarilla, Tuscaretta
  - Family Porospathidae Borgert 1900 – Porospathis
  - Family Polypyramidae Reschetnjak 1966 – Polypyramis
- Order Phaeogromida Haeckel 1887
  - Family Challengeridae Murray 1886 – Challengeria, Challengeron
  - Family Medusettiidae Haeckel 1887 – Euphysetta, Gazelletta, Medusetta
  - Family Lirellidae Loeblich & Tappan 1961 – Borgertella, Lirella
- Order Phaeoconchida Haeckel 1887
  - Family Concharidae Haeckel 1887 – Conchidium
- Order Phaeodendrida Haeckel 1887
  - Family Coelodendridae Haeckel 1887 – Coelodendrum, Coelographis
