= Castanidium elegans =

Scientific classification
- Domain: Eukaryota
- Clade: Sar
- Clade: Rhizaria
- Phylum: Cercozoa
- Subphylum: Filosa
- Class: Thecofilosea
- Subclass: Phaeodaria
- Order: Phaeocalpida
- Family: Castanellidae
- Genus: Castanidium
- Species: C. elegans

Binomial name
- Castanidium elegans Schmidt, 1908

Species of single-celled organism

Castanidium elegans is a species of cercozoans in the family Castanellidae. It is found in the Sargasso Sea and in the current around the Canary Islands.
