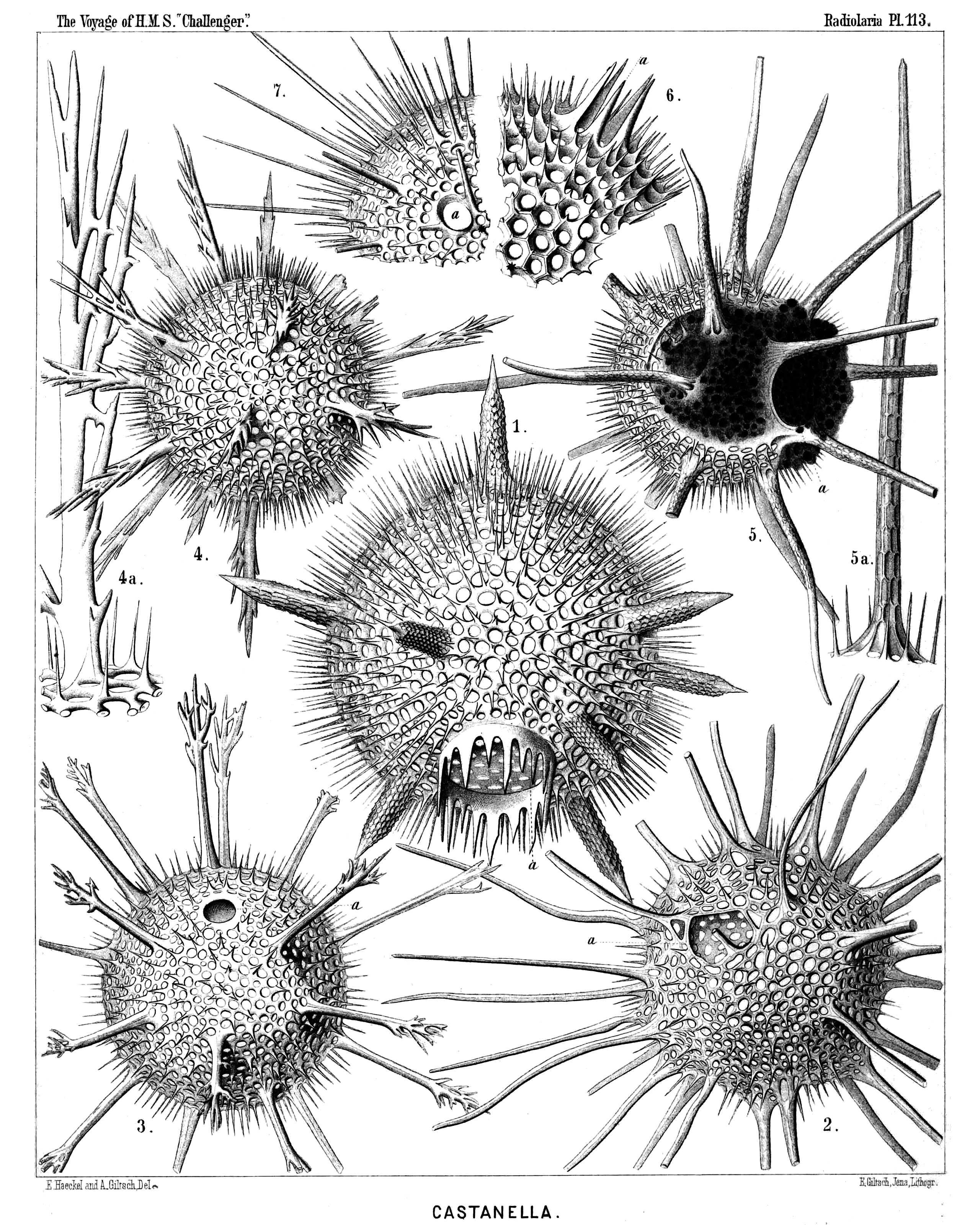
- Illustration from Report on the Radiolaria collected by H.M.S. Challenger during the years 1873-1876. Part III, Ernst Haeckel (1834-1919), engravings by Adolf Giltsch (1852-1911), 1887. Plate 113. Castanellida. Fig. 2. Castanidium moseleyi, n. sp., × 80; Fig. 5. Castanidium murrayi, n. sp., × 100; Fig. 7. Castanidium buchanani, n. sp., × 100

Scientific classification
- Domain: Eukaryota
- Clade: Sar
- Clade: Rhizaria
- Phylum: Cercozoa
- Subphylum: Filosa
- Class: Thecofilosea
- Subclass: Phaeodaria
- Order: Phaeocalpida
- Family: Castanellidae
- Genus: Castanidium; Haeckel, 1879

Species
- Castanidium elegans Schmidt, 1908; Castanidium haeckeri Schröder; Castanidium longispinum Haecker; Castanidium moseleyi Haeckel, 1887; Castanidium spinosum Schröder; Castanidium vanhoeffeni Schröder; Castanidium variabile Borgert, 1890

= Castanidium =

Genus of single-celled organisms

Castanidium is a genus of cercozoans in the family Castanellidae.
