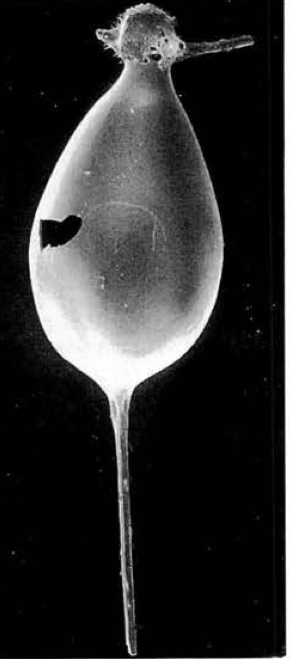
- Tuscaridium lithornithium

Scientific classification
- Domain: Eukaryota
- Clade: Sar
- Clade: Rhizaria
- Phylum: Cercozoa
- Class: Thecofilosea
- Order: Phaeocalpida
- Family: Tuscaroridae
- Genus: Tuscaridium; Haeckel, 1887

= Tuscaridium =

Genus of phaeodarian

Tuscaridium is a genus of phaeodarian, (formerly thought to be radiolarians). They consume particles that sink quickly through water which would otherwise reach the deep ocean. Tuscaridiums make cellular colonies (they make a colony like a pyrosome ). The genus contains bioluminescent species. It one of two known bioluminescent phaeodarean genera, the other being Aulosphaera.

== Species ==
The following species are known (incomplete list):

- Tuscaridium cygneum
- Tuscaridium cygenum
- Tuscaridium lithornithium
