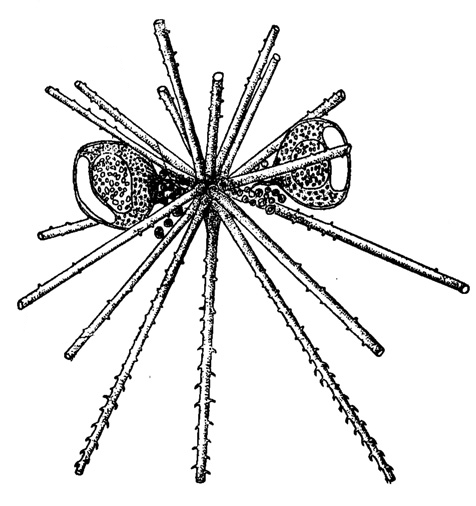
- Illustration of A. paradoxa

Scientific classification
- Domain: Eukaryota
- Clade: Sar
- Clade: Rhizaria
- Phylum: Cercozoa
- Class: Thecofilosea
- Subclass: Phaeodaria
- Order: Phaeocystida
- Family: Astracanthidae
- Genus: Astracantha; Haecker, 1908

Species
- A. heteracantha; A. heteracanthoides; A. paradoxa; A. umbellifera

= Astracantha =

Species of cercozoan

Astracantha is a genus of planktonic phaeodaria and the only member of the family Astracanthidae. They are an unusual family of marine protists, but can be found across all oceans, from tropical to Arctic and Antarctic waters.

== Morphology ==
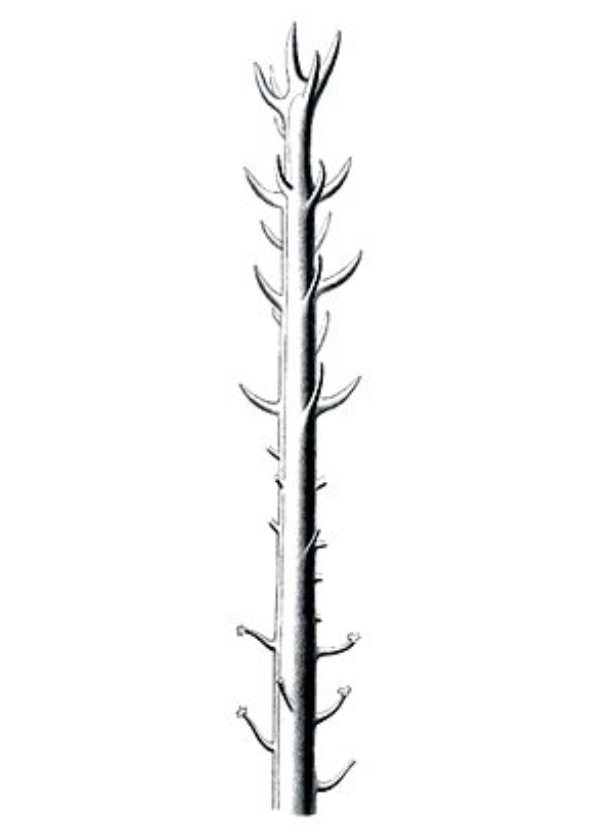
Radial spine of A. heteracantha

This genus is characterized by a skeleton or theca comprised by 30 to 40 hollow spines radiating from the central focal point. Midway along each spine there are numerous short, irregularly spaced, outwardly curved branches that bear terminal thorns proximally (i.e. closer to the cell), but become terminally (i.e. further from the cell) smooth-pointed and slightly thicker. The length of their radial tubes is around 1.8 millimeters.

== Distribution ==
The Astracanthidae are a very unusual family of phaeodarians. Astracantha paradoxa was reported in 1908 by Valentin Haecker in five warm water stations in the Atlantic and Indian oceans. In 1986 it was reported for the first time from the Antarctic and South Pacific oceans. Astracantha heteracantha was reported by Haecker twice, once in the Antarctic and once in the tropical Atlantic, and later has been found abundantly in the South Atlantic. In samples taken by the oceanographic research ship Eltanin, both species were present but scarce at all localities, except the Ross Sea, where A. paradoxa was absent. Astracantha heteracanthoides is found in deep waters of the tropical Atlantic.

== Taxonomy ==
Astracantha was first described by the zoologist Valentin Haecker in 1908. It is the only member of the family Astracanthidae, described by Ernst Haeckel in 1887. Four species are known:

- Astracantha heteracantha Haecker, 1908
- Astracantha heteracanthoides Haecker, 1908
- Astracantha paradoxa Haecker, 1908
- Astracantha umbellifera Haecker, 1908
