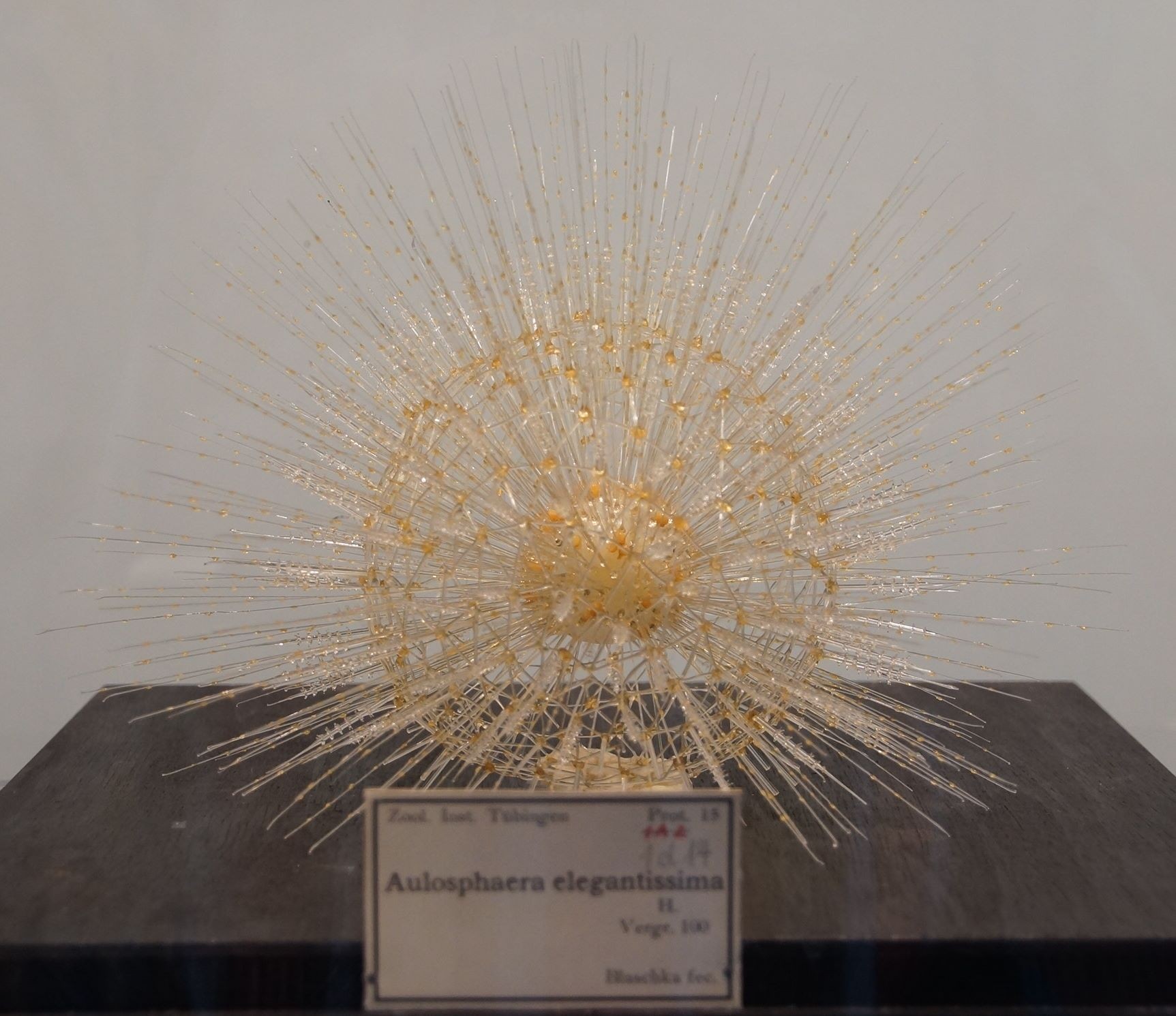

Scientific classification
- Domain: Eukaryota
- Clade: Sar
- Clade: Rhizaria
- Phylum: Cercozoa
- Class: Thecofilosea
- Order: Phaeosphaerida
- Family: Aulosphaeridae
- Genus: Aulosphaera; Haeckel, 1887

= Aulosphaera =

Genus of single-celled organisms

Aulosphaera is a genus of Cercozoa. The genus contains bioluminescent species. It one of two known bioluminescent phaeodarean genera (formerly thought to be radiolarians), the other being Tuscaridium. The described bioluminescent species is Aulosphaera triodon Haeckel, 1887.

== Species ==
The following species are known (incomplete list):

- Aulosphaera elegantissima Haeckel
- Aulosphaera trigonopa Haeckel, 1860
- Aulosphaera bisternaria Haeckel
- Aulosphaera filigera Haecker, 1908
- Aulosphaera labradoriensis Borgert
- Aulosphaera robusta Haecker, 1908
- Aulosphaera triodon Haeckel, 1887
- Aulosphaera trispathis Haecker, 1908
- Aulosphaera verticillata Haeckel
