= Phaeogymnocellida =

Scientific classification
- Domain: Eukaryota
- Clade: Sar
- Clade: Rhizaria
- Phylum: Cercozoa
- Class: Thecofilosea
- Subclass: Phaeodaria
- Order: Phaeogymnocellida; J. Cachon & M. Cachon, 1982 ex Cachon & Cachon, 1985

Families
- Atlanticellidae; Phaeodinidae; Phaeosphaeridae

Order of single-celled organisms

Phaeogymnocellida is an order of cercozoans in the subclass Phaeodaria.
