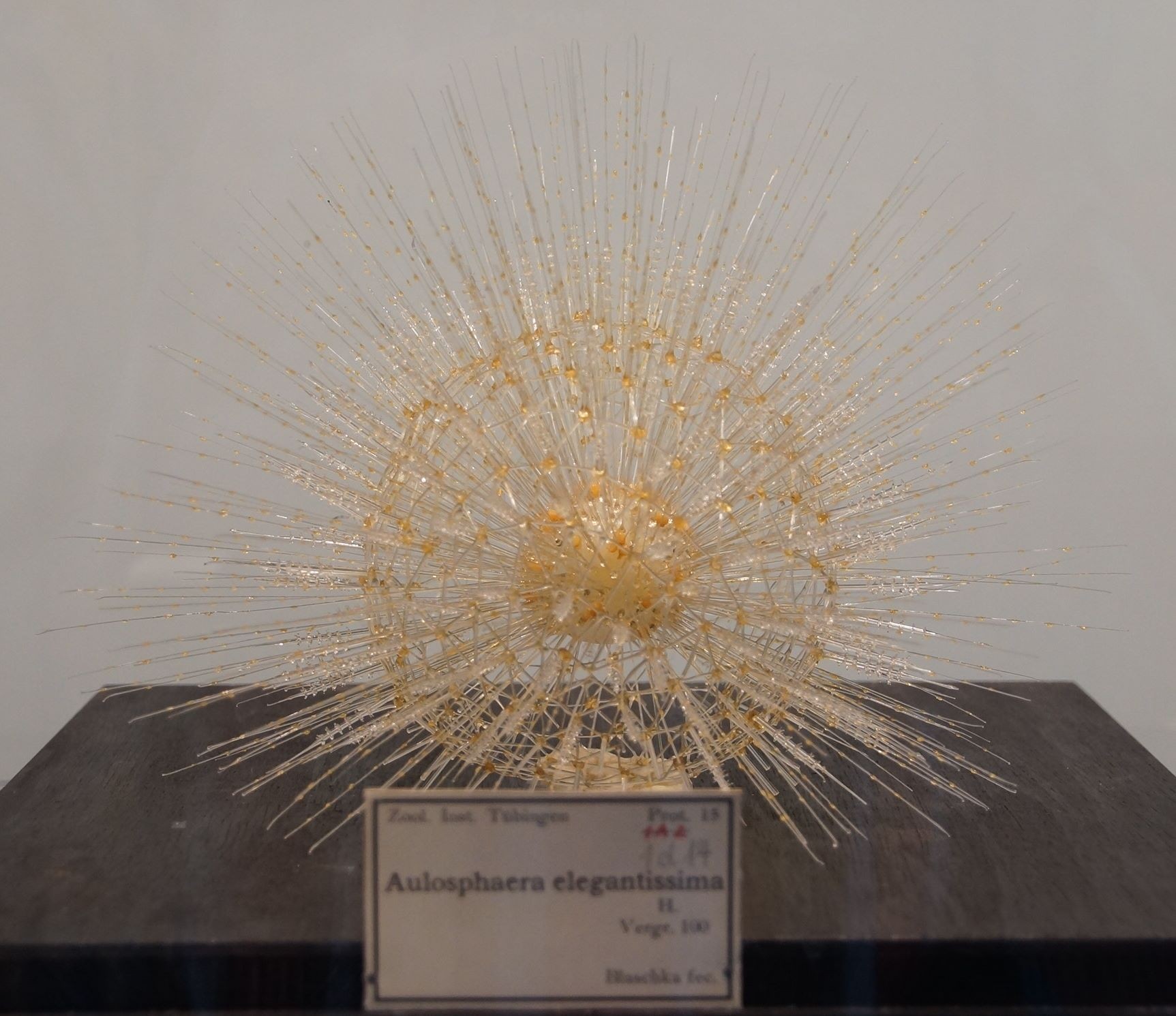
- Blaschka glass model of Aulosphaera elegantissima

Scientific classification
- Domain: Eukaryota
- Clade: Sar
- Clade: Rhizaria
- Phylum: Cercozoa
- Class: Thecofilosea
- Order: Phaeosphaerida
- Family: Aulosphaeridae; Haeckel, 1887

Genera
- Auloscena; Aulosphaera

= Aulosphaeridae =

Family of single-celled organisms

Aulosphaeridae is a family of cercozoans in the order Phaeosphaerida.
