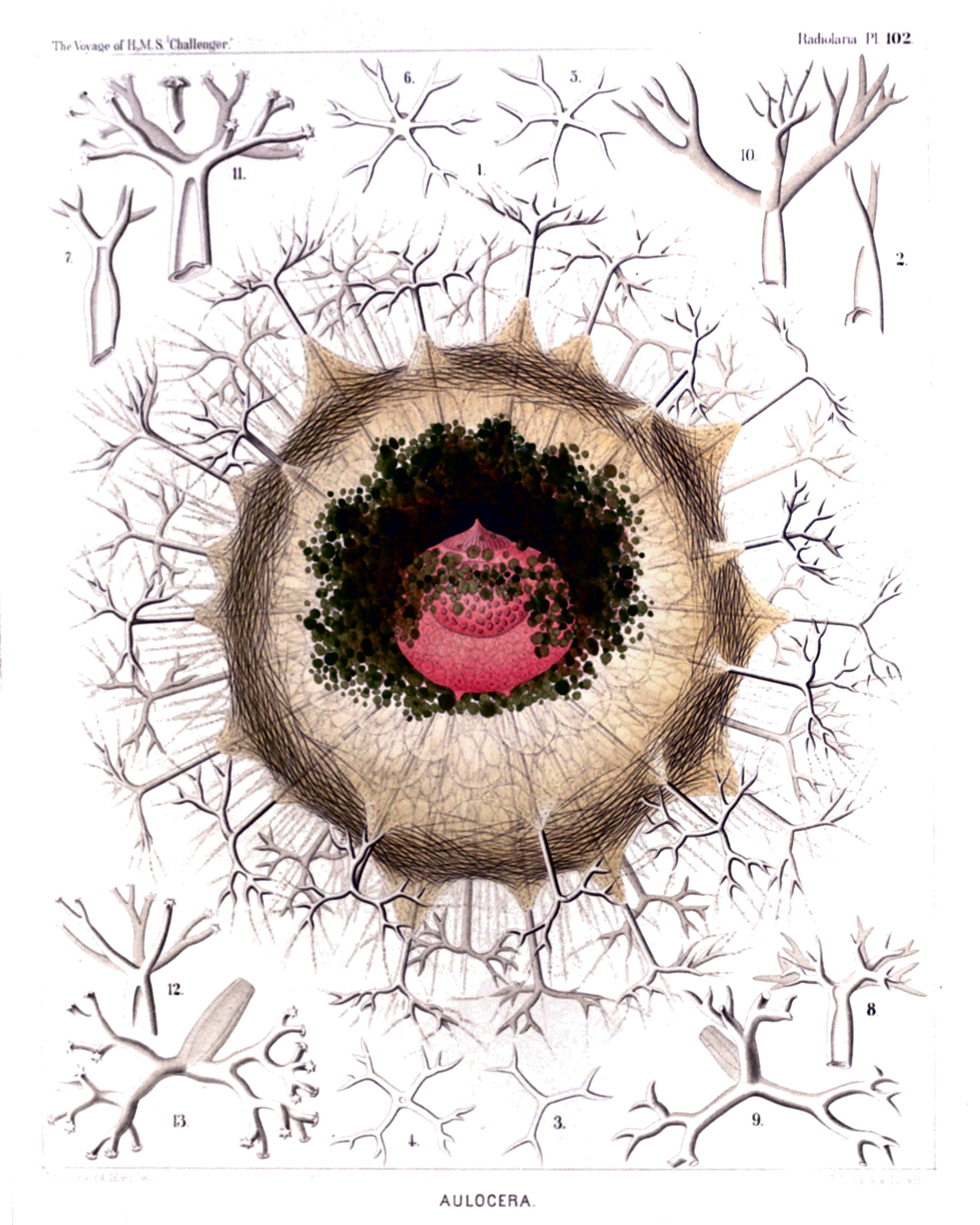
- Auloceros spp. (Aulacanthidae)

Scientific classification
- Domain: Eukaryota
- Clade: Sar
- Clade: Rhizaria
- Phylum: Cercozoa
- Class: Thecofilosea
- Subclass: Phaeodaria
- Clade?: Opaloconchida
- Order: Phaeocystida; Haeckel, 1887

Families
- Astracanthidae; Aulacanthidae

= Phaeocystida =

Group of single-celled organisms

Phaeocystida, also known as Phaeocystina, is a group of cercozoans in the class Phaeodarea. It was first described by Ernst Haeckel in 1887 and treated traditionally as a suborder, but later was raised to order level until Cavalier-Smith's classification lowered it again to suborder level. It belongs to the order Eodarida, characterised by simpler silica skeletons or a lack thereof.
