= Blaschka =

Blaschka is a surname. Notable people with the surname include:

- Jett Blaschka (born), American footballer
- Leopold and Rudolf Blaschka, German glass artists
- Stefanie Blaschka (born 1995), German politician (CDU)
