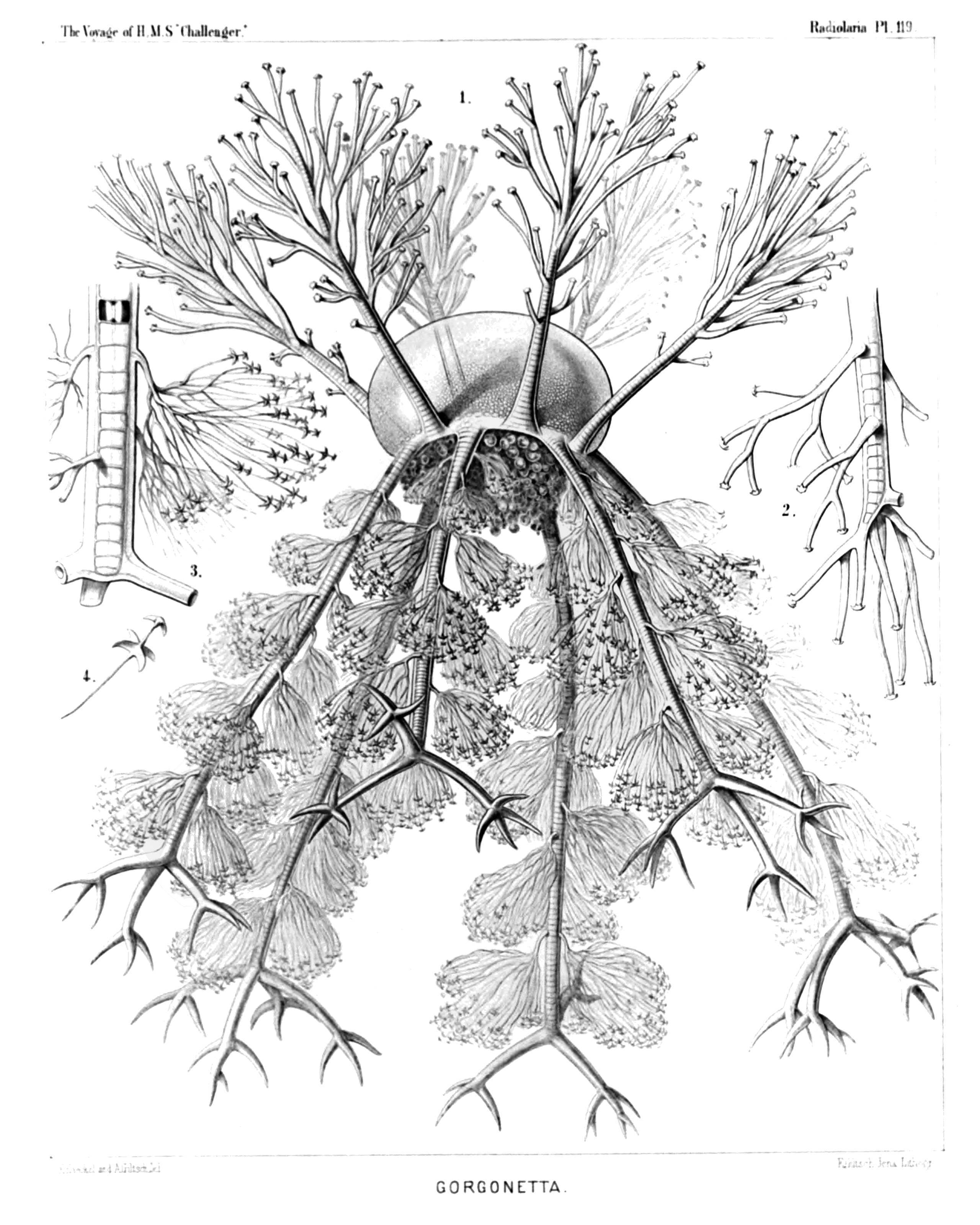
- Gorgonetta mirabilis (Medusettidae)

Scientific classification
- Domain: Eukaryota
- Clade: Sar
- Clade: Rhizaria
- Phylum: Cercozoa
- Class: Thecofilosea
- Subclass: Phaeodaria
- Order: Phaeogromida; Haeckel, 1887

Families
- Challengeridae; Lirellidae; Medusettidae

= Phaeogromida =

Order of single-celled organisms

Phaeogromida is an order of cercozoans in the class Phaeodarea.
