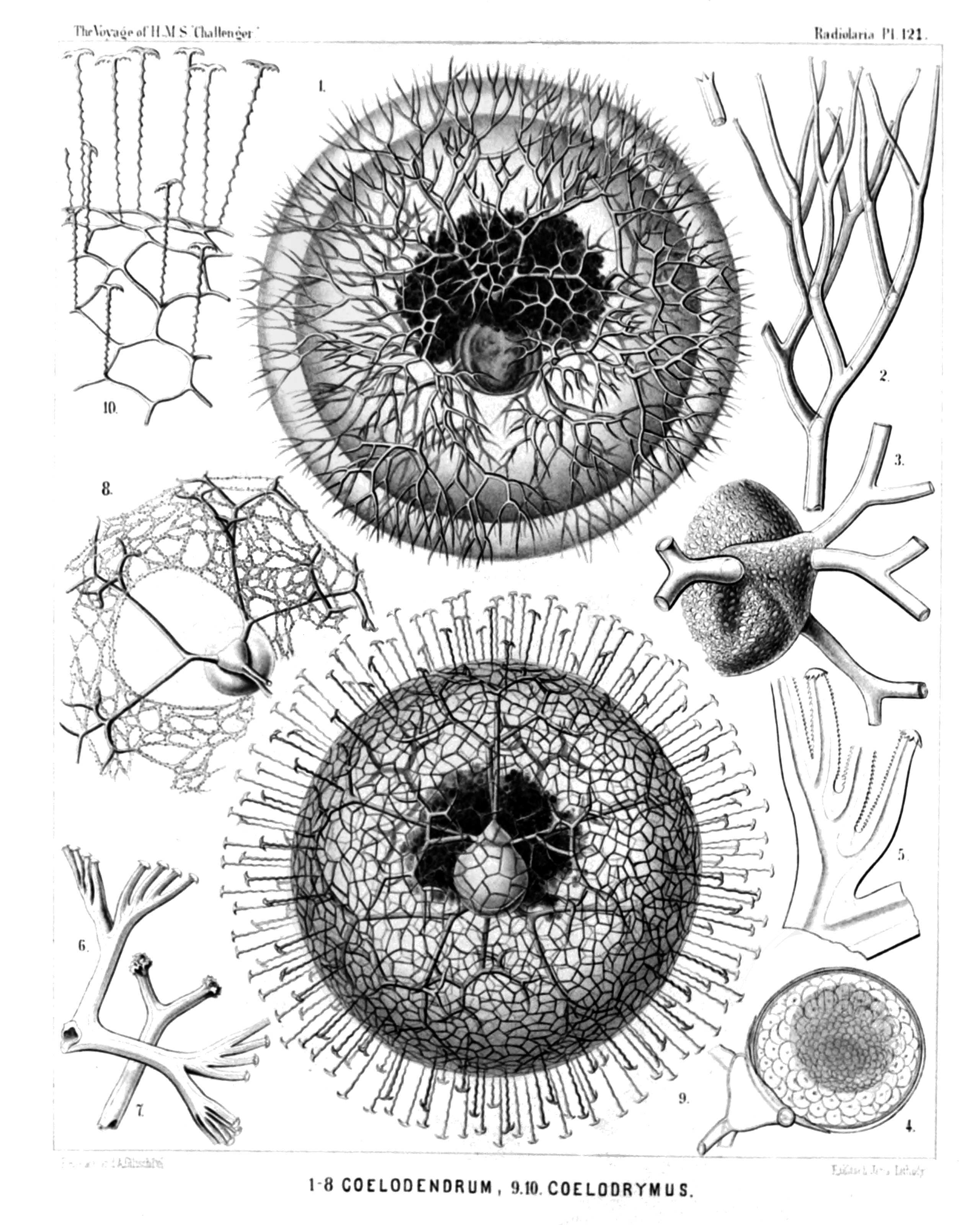

Scientific classification
- Domain: Eukaryota
- Clade: Sar
- Clade: Rhizaria
- Phylum: Cercozoa
- Subphylum: Filosa
- Class: Thecofilosea
- Subclass: Phaeodaria
- Order: Phaeodendrida
- Family: Coelodendridae; Haeckel, 1887

Genera
- Coelodendrum; Coelographis

= Phaeodendrida =

Order of single-celled organisms

Phaeodendrida is an order of cercozoans in the subclass Phaeodaria.
