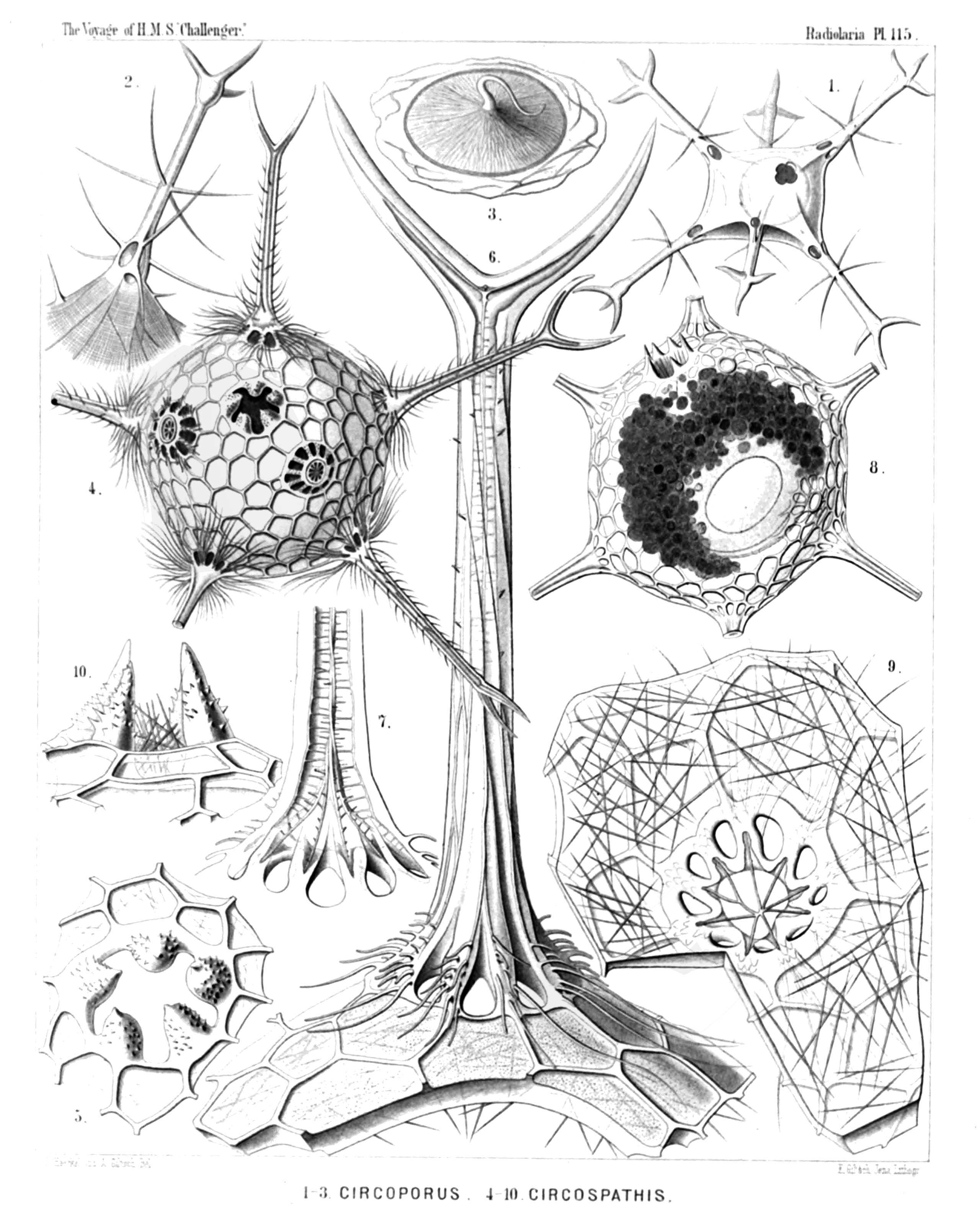

Scientific classification
- Domain: Eukaryota
- Clade: Sar
- Clade: Rhizaria
- Phylum: Cercozoa
- Class: Thecofilosea
- Order: Phaeocalpida
- Family: Circoporidae; Haeckel, 1887

Genera
- ?Circogonia; ?Circoporus; ?Circostephanus; ?Haeckeliana

= Circoporidae =

Family of single-celled organisms

Circoporidae is a family of cercozoans, single-celled eukaryotes in the order Phaeocalpida.
