= Aulacanthidae =

Scientific classification
- Domain: Eukaryota
- Clade: Sar
- Clade: Rhizaria
- Phylum: Cercozoa
- Class: Thecofilosea
- Order: Phaeocystida
- Family: Aulacanthidae; Haeckel, 1887

Families
- Aulacantha; Aulographis

Family of single-celled organisms

Aulacanthidae is a family of cercozoans in the order Phaeocystida.
