= Endoplasm =

Inner part of a cell's cytoplasm

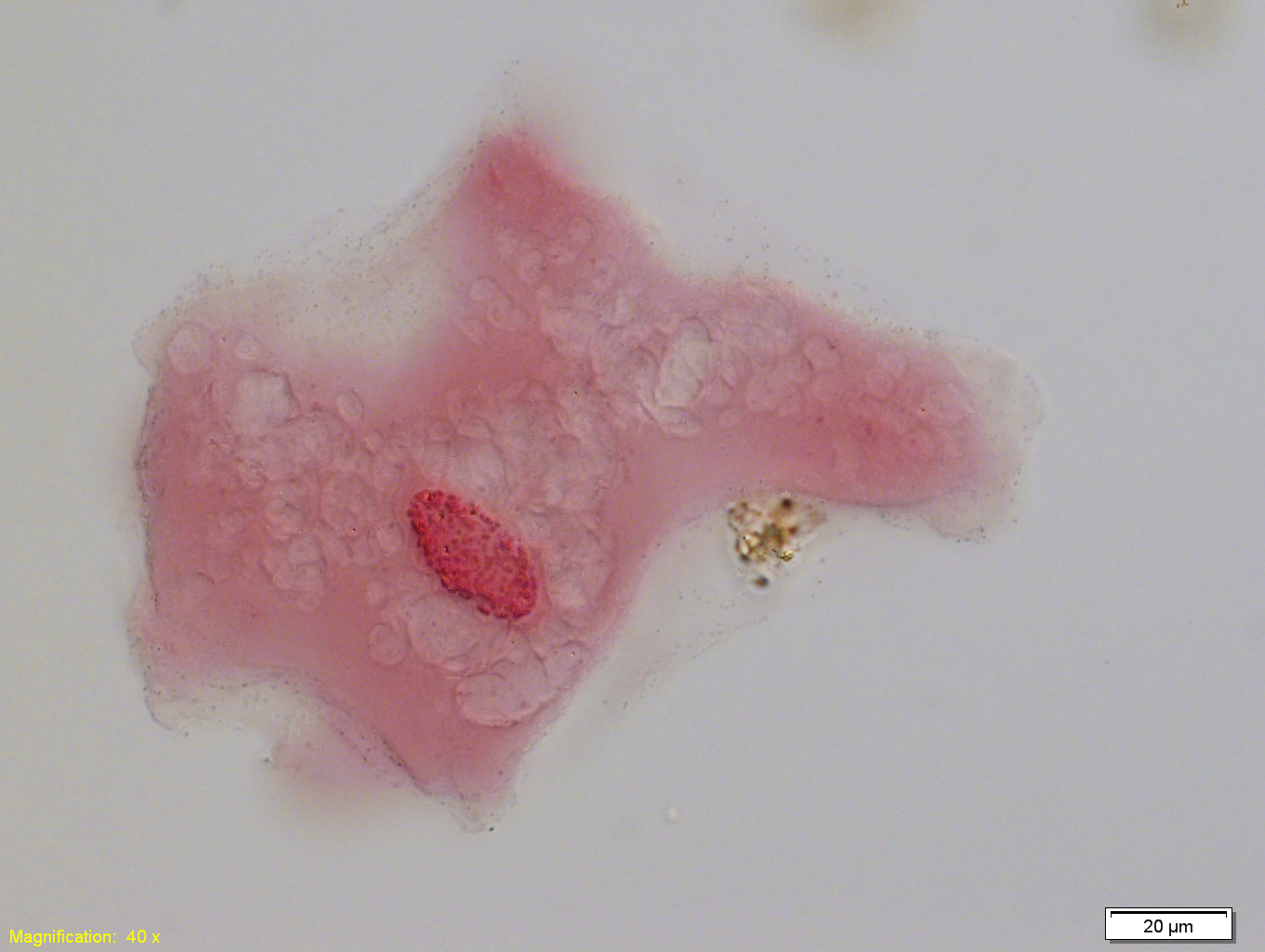
Shown is a micrograph of an amoeba; the darker pink nucleus is central to the eukaryotic cell, with the majority of the rest of the cell's body belonging to the endoplasm. Though not visible, the ectoplasm resides directly internal to the plasma membrane.

Endoplasm, also known as entoplasm, generally refers to the inner (often granulated), dense part of a cell's cytoplasm. The nucleus is separated from the endoplasm by the nuclear envelope. In an amoeba and other protists the outer part of the cytoplasm is known as the ectoplasm. The different makeups/viscosities of the endoplasm and ectoplasm contribute to the amoeba's locomotion through the formation of a pseudopod. The endoplasm, along with its granules, contains water, nucleic acids, amino acids, carbohydrates, inorganic ions, lipids, enzymes, and other molecular compounds. It is the site of most cellular processes as it houses the organelles that make up the endomembrane system, as well as those that stand alone. The endoplasm is necessary for most metabolic activities, including cell division.

The endoplasm, like the cytoplasm, is far from static. It is in a constant state of flux through intracellular transport, as vesicles are shuttled between organelles and to/from the plasma membrane. Materials are regularly both degraded and synthesized within the endoplasm based on the needs of the cell and/or organism. Some components of the cytoskeleton run throughout the endoplasm though most are concentrated in the ectoplasm - towards the cell's edges, closer to the plasma membrane. The endoplasm's granules are suspended in cytosol.

== Granules ==
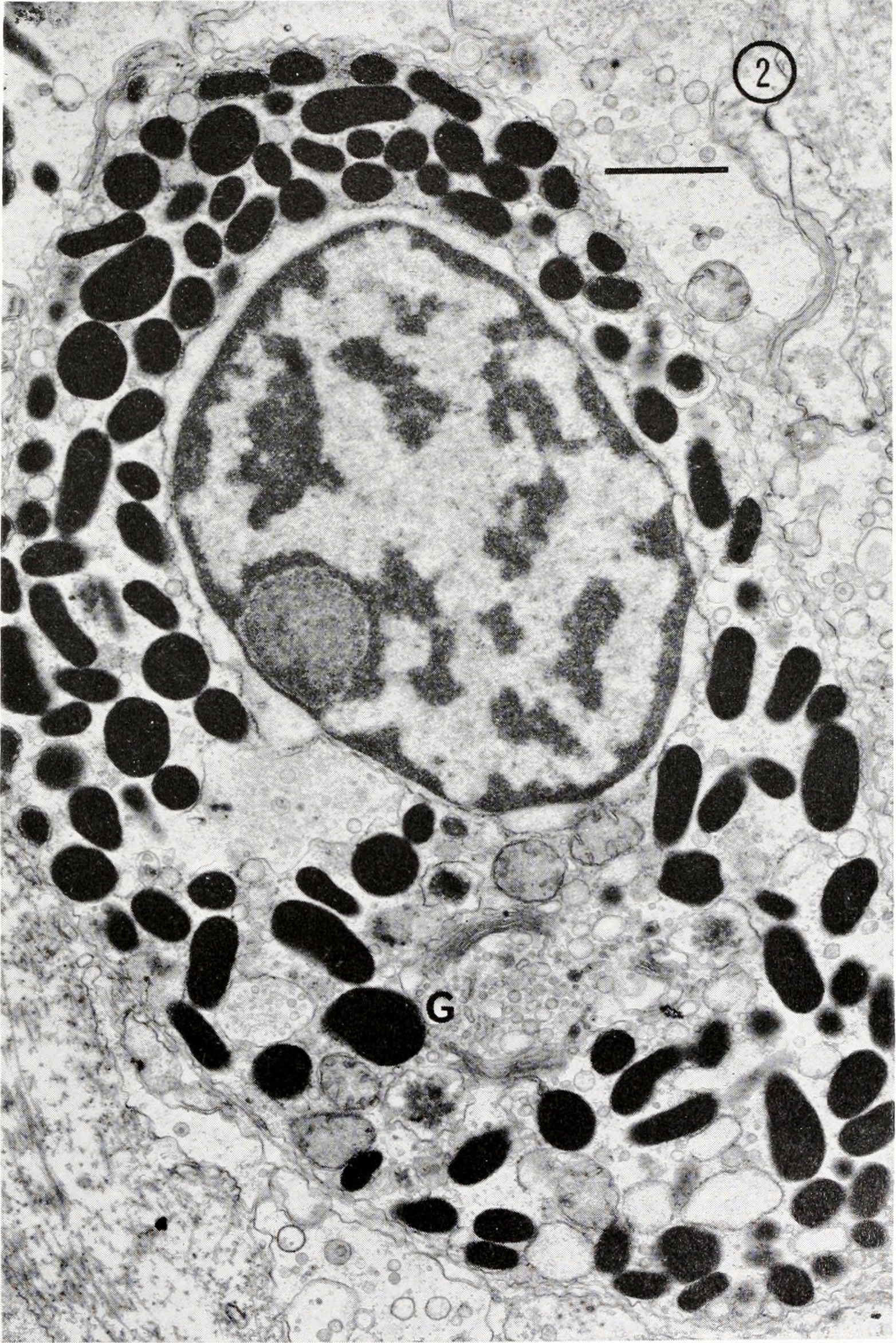
This is a perikaryon of a nerve cell, displayed here because of the obvious cytoplasmic granules. The granules, which appear almost black due to their high electron density, take up a large portion of the endoplasm. They are suspended in cytosol - the fluid component of the cytoplasm.

The term granule refers to a small particle within the endoplasm, typically the secretory vesicles. The granule is the defining characteristic of the endoplasm, as they are typically not present within the ectoplasm. These offshoots of the endomembrane system are enclosed by a phospholipid bilayer and can fuse with other organelles as well as the plasma membrane. Their membrane is only semipermeable and allows them to house substances that could be harmful to the cell if they were allowed to flow freely within the cytosol. These granules give the cell a large amount of regulation and control over the wide variety of metabolic activities that take place within the endoplasm. There are many different types, characterized by the substance that the vesicle contains. These granules/vesicles can contain enzymes, neurotransmitters, hormones, and waste. Typically the contents are destined for another cell/tissue. These vesicles act as a form of storage and release their contents when needed, often prompted by a signaling pathway. Once signaled to move, the vesicles can travel along aspects of the cytoskeleton via motor proteins to reach their final destination.

== Cytosol component of endoplasm ==
The cytosol makes up the semifluid portion of the endoplasm, in which materials are suspended. It is a concentrated aqueous gel with molecules so crowded and packed together within the water base that its behavior is more gel-like than liquid. It is water based but contains both small and large molecules, giving it density. It has several functions, including physical support of the cell, preventing collapse, as well as degrading nutrients, transport of small molecules, and containing the ribosomes responsible for protein synthesis.

Cytosol contains predominantly water, but also has a complex mixture of large hydrophilic molecules, smaller molecules and proteins, and dissolved ions. The contents of the cytosol change based on the needs of the cell. Not to be confused with the cytoplasm, the cytosol is only the gel matrix of the cell which does not include many of the macromolecules essential to cellular function.

== Locomotion of amoeba via endoplasmic changes ==
Though amoeba locomotion is assisted by appendages like flagella and cilia, the main source of movement in these cells is pseudopodial locomotion. The outer region of ectoplasm is the driving force for pseudopodia formation. When the ectoplasm contracts, the resulting cytoplasmic streaming caused the formation of the pseudopodia. Pseudopod or “false foot” is the term for the extension of a cell's plasma membrane into what appears to be an appendage that pulls the cell forward. The process behind this involves the gel of the ectoplasm, and sol, more fluid, portion of the endoplasm. To create the pseudopod, the gel of the ectoplasm begins to convert to sol which, along with the endoplasm, pushes a portion of the plasma membrane into an appendage. Once the pseudopod is extended, the sol within begins to peripherally convert back to gel, converting back to the ectoplasm as the lagging cell body flows up into the pseudopod moving the cell forward. Though research has shown aspects of the cytoskeleton (specifically microfilaments) assist with pseudopod formation, the exact mechanism is unknown. Research on the shelled amoeba Difflugia demonstrated that microfilaments lie both parallel and perpendicular to the axis of contraction of the plasma membrane to assist with plasma membrane extension into an appendage.

== Processes within the endoplasm ==
This image displays the 3 main processes of cell respiration - the pathway from which the cell obtains energy in the form of ATP. These processes include glycolysis, the citric acid cycle, and the electron transport chain.

=== Cellular respiration ===
The mitochondria are vital to the efficiency of eukaryotes. These organelles break down simple sugars like glucose to create a multitude of ATP (adenosine triphosphate) molecules. ATP provides the energy for protein synthesis, which takes about 75% of the cell's energy, as well as other cellular processes like signaling pathways. The number of mitochondria present in the cell's endoplasm varies based on the cell's metabolic needs. Cells that must make a large amount of proteins or break down a lot of material require a large amount of mitochondria. Glucose is broken down through three sequential processes: glycolysis, the citric acid cycle, and the electron transport chain.

=== Protein synthesis ===
Protein synthesis begins at the ribosome, both free ones and those bound to the rough endoplasmic reticulum. Each ribosome is composed of two subunits and is responsible for translating genetic codes from mRNA into proteins by creating strings of amino acids called peptides. Proteins are usually not ready for their final target after leaving the ribosome. Ribosomes attached to endoplasmic reticulum release their protein chains into the lumen of the endoplasmic reticulum, which is the beginning of the endomembrane system. Within the ER the proteins are folded and modified by the addition of molecules like carbohydrates, then are sent to the Golgi apparatus, where they are further modified and packaged to be sent to their final destination. Vesicles are responsible for transport in between components of the endomembrane system and the plasma membrane.

=== Other metabolic activities ===
In addition to these two main processes, there are many other activities that take place in the endoplasm. Lysosomes degrade waste and toxins with the enzymes they contain. Smooth endoplasmic reticulum makes hormones and lipids, degrades toxins, and controls cellular levels of calcium. Though most control of cell division is present in the nucleus, the centrosomes present in the endoplasm assist with spindle formation. The endoplasm is the site of many activities necessary for the cell to maintain homeostasis.
