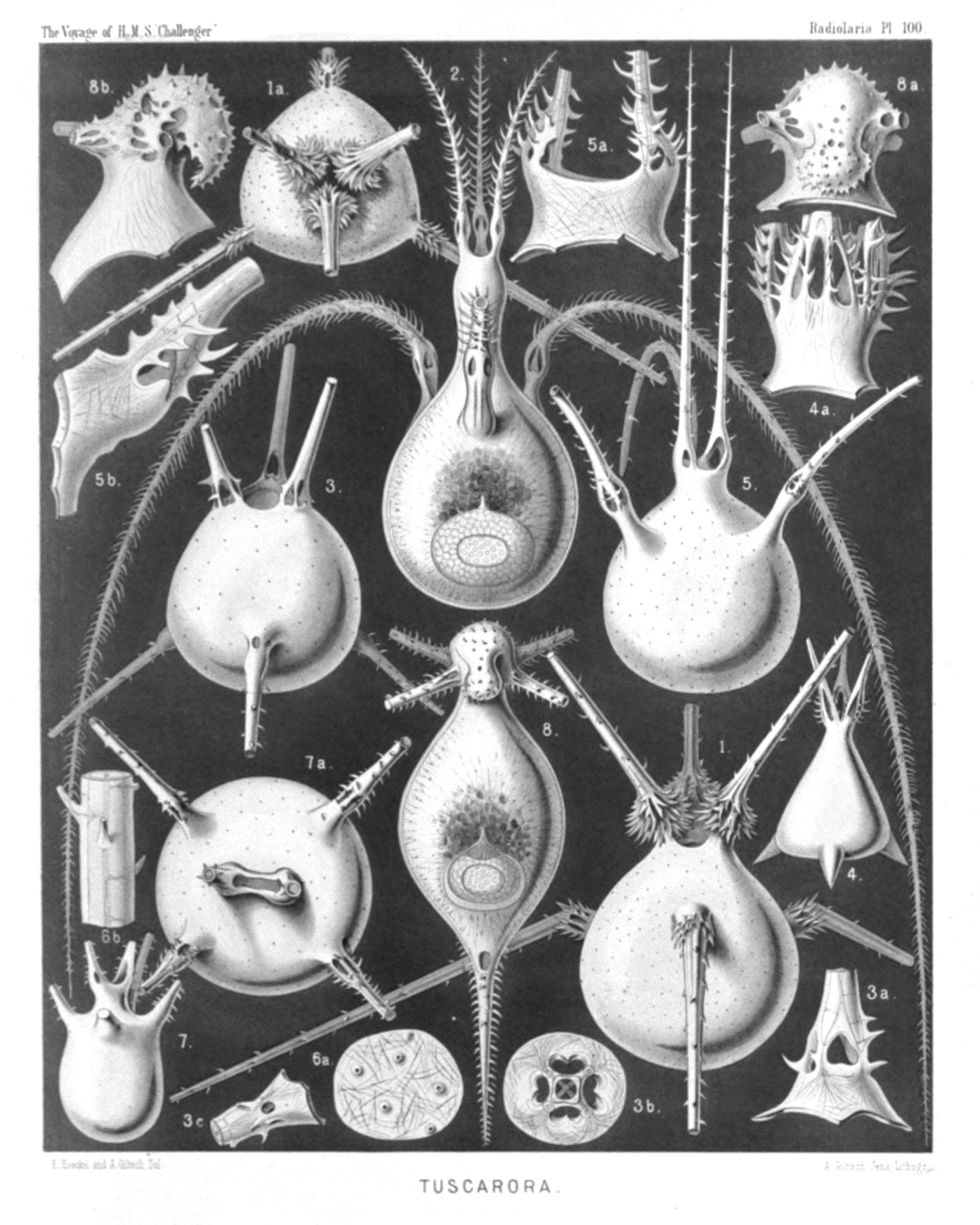

Scientific classification
- Domain: Eukaryota
- Clade: Sar
- Clade: Rhizaria
- Phylum: Cercozoa
- Class: Thecofilosea
- Order: Phaeocalpida
- Family: Tuscaroridae; Haeckel, 1887

Genera
- Tuscaretta; Tuscarilla; Tuscaridium

= Tuscaroridae =

Family of single-celled organisms

Tuscaroridae is a family of cercozoans, single-celled eukaryotes in the order Phaeocalpida.
