= Valentin Haecker =

German zoologist (1864–1927)

Ferdinand Carl Valentin Haecker (15 September 1864 – 19 December 1927) was a German zoologist, reader at Freiburg University from 1892. In 1900, he became professor at the University of Applied Sciences Stuttgart and in 1909 at Martin Luther University of Halle-Wittenberg. He was president of the Deutsche Zoologische Gesellschaft from 1922. He died unexpectedly from a stroke.

Haecker's contributions span the fields of ornithology, plankton (Radiolaria) cell biology, developmental physiology, genetics (where he established the subfield of phenogenetics). He also published a historical treatise on Goethe's work on morphology.
