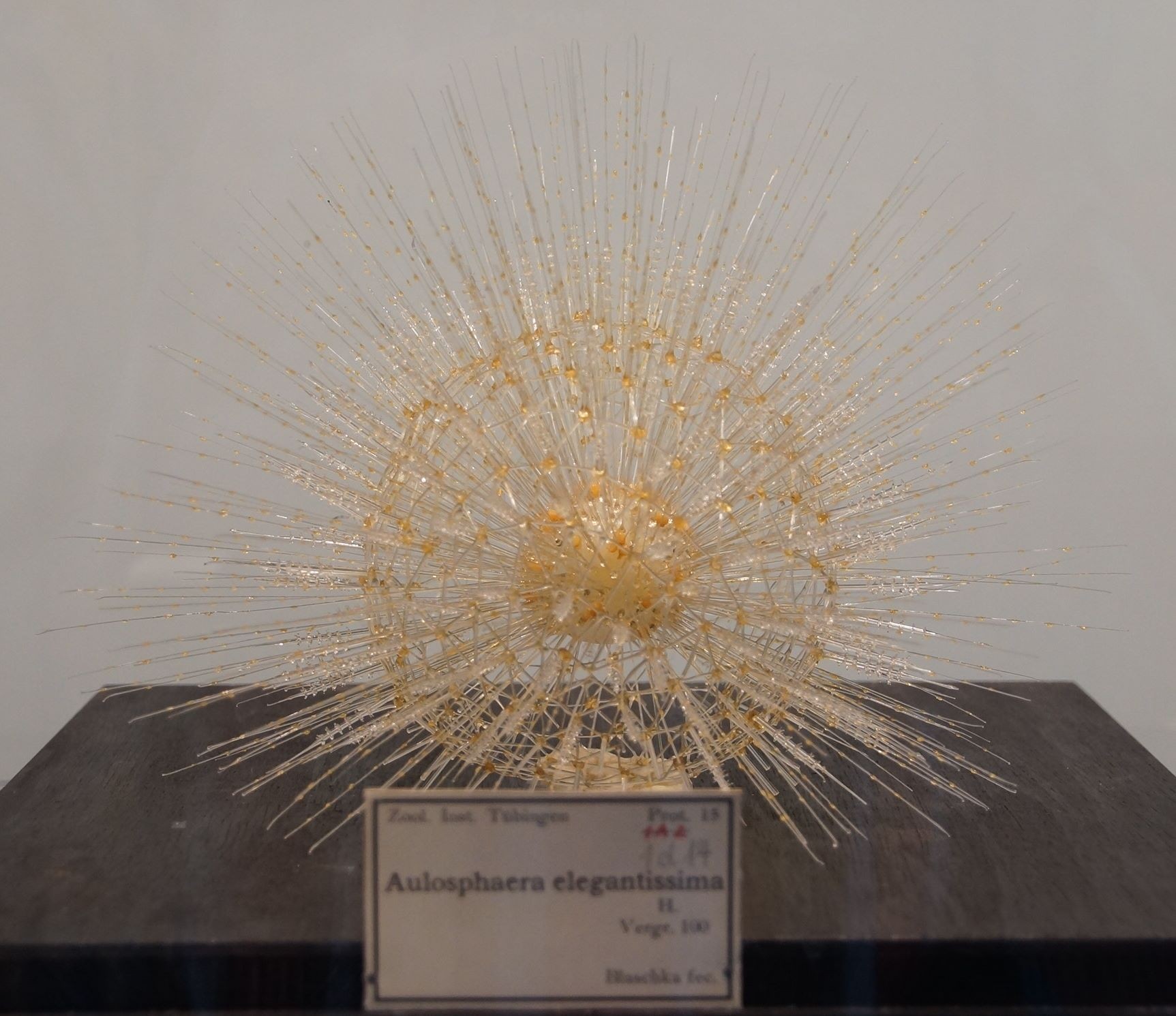
- Blaschka glass model of Aulosphaera elegantissima

Scientific classification
- Domain: Eukaryota
- Clade: Sar
- Clade: Rhizaria
- Phylum: Cercozoa
- Class: Thecofilosea
- Subclass: Phaeodaria
- Order: Phaeosphaerida; Haeckel, 1887

Families
- Aulosphaeridae; Cannosphaeridae; Sagosphaeridae

= Phaeosphaerida =

Order of single-celled organisms

Phaeosphaerida is an order of cercozoans in the class Phaeodarea.
