= Stefanie Blaschka =

German politician (born 1995)

Member of the Hamburg Parliament
- Incumbent
- Assumed office 26 March 2025

Personal details
- Born: 1995 (age 30–31)
- Party: Christian Democratic Union

Stefanie Blaschka (born 1995) is a German politician serving as a member of the Hamburg Parliament since 2025. She has served as chairwoman of the Christian Democratic Union in Hamm since 2017.
