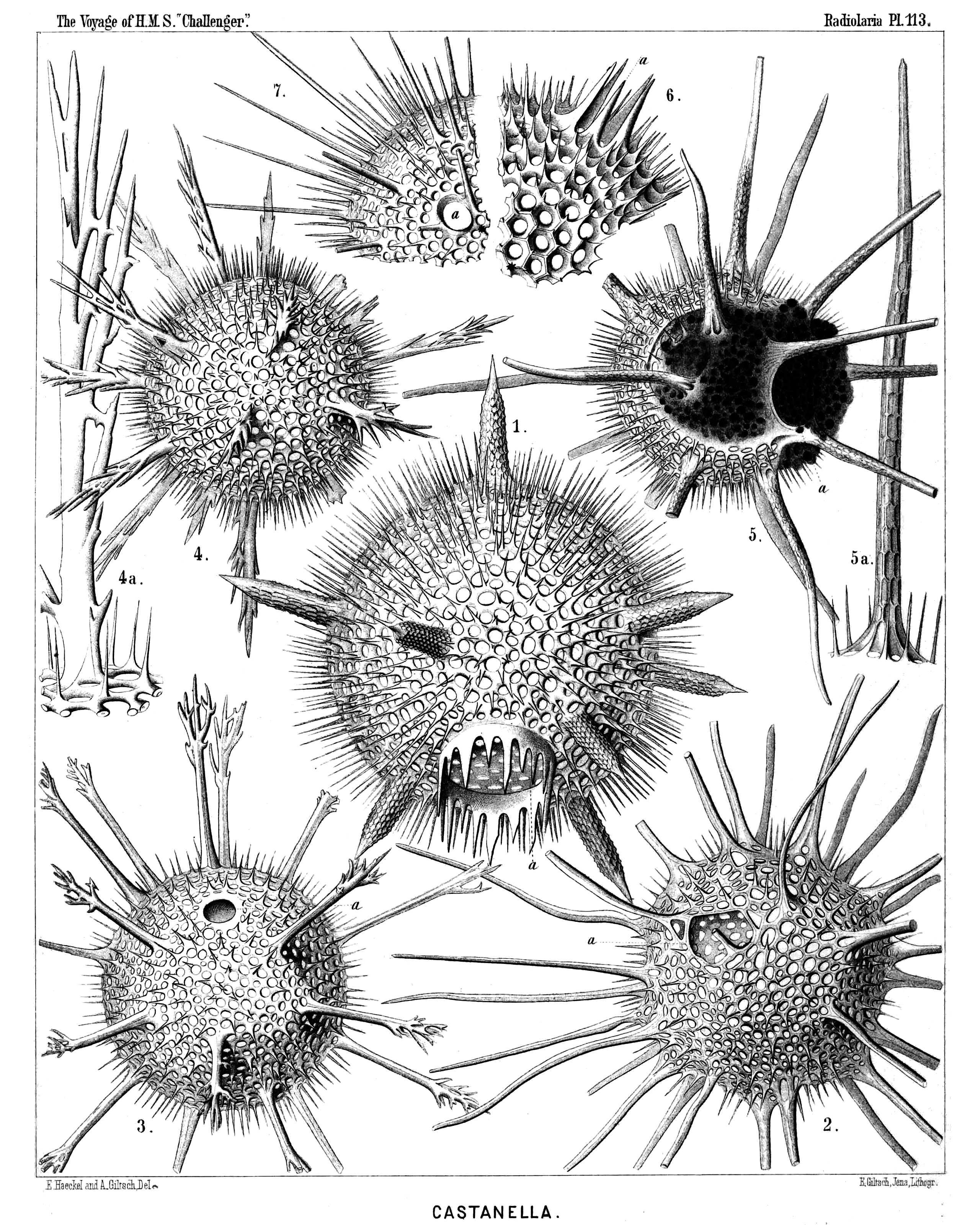

Scientific classification
- Domain: Eukaryota
- Clade: Sar
- Clade: Rhizaria
- Phylum: Cercozoa
- Class: Thecofilosea
- Order: Phaeocalpida
- Family: Castanellidae; Haeckel, 1887

Genera
- Castanidium

= Castanellidae =

Family of single-celled organisms

Castanellidae is a family of cercozoans in the order Phaeocalpida.
