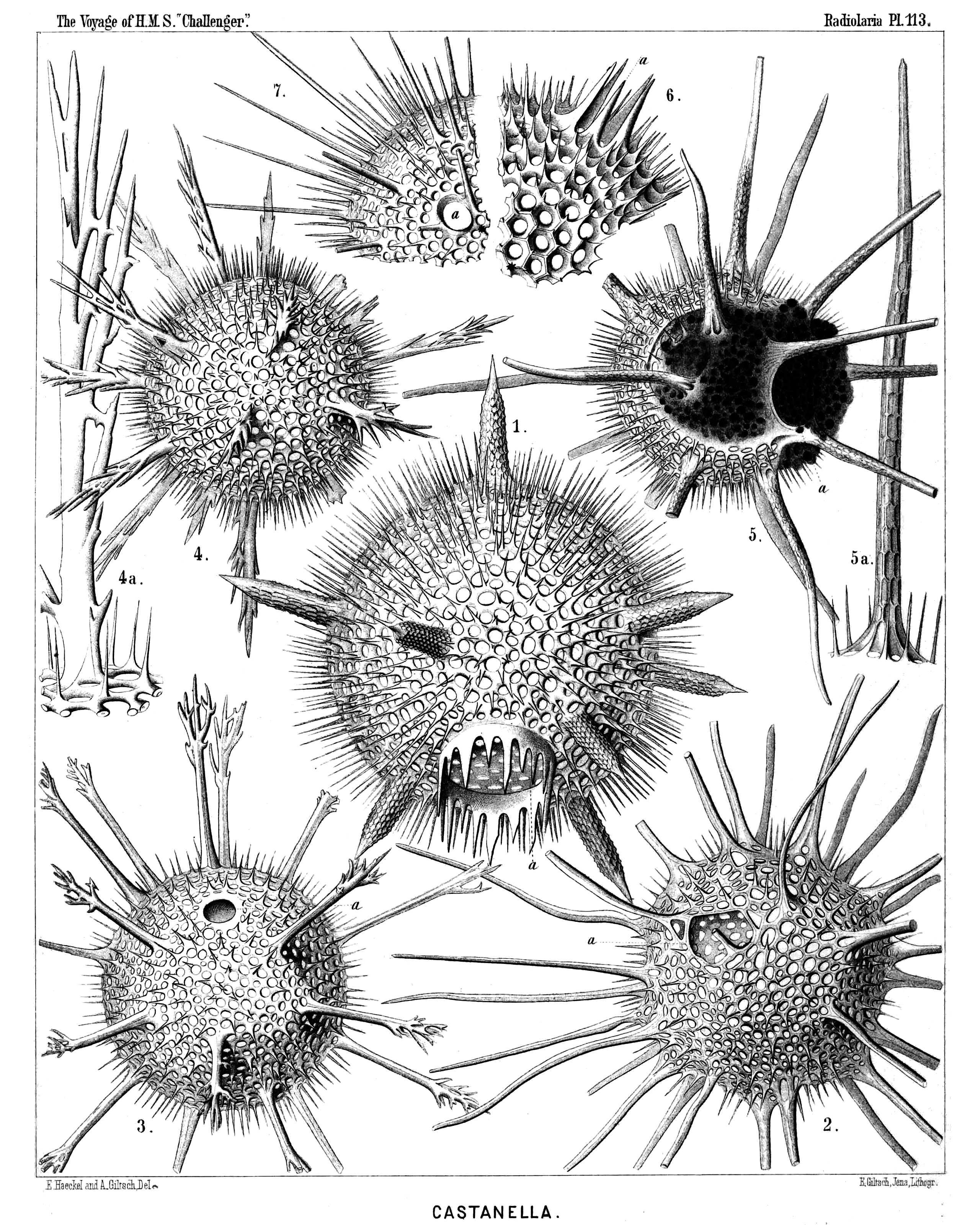
- Castanellidae spp.

Scientific classification
- Domain: Eukaryota
- Clade: Sar
- Clade: Rhizaria
- Phylum: Cercozoa
- Class: Thecofilosea
- Subclass: Phaeodaria
- Order: Phaeocalpida; Haeckel, 1887

Families
- Castanellidae; Circoporidae; Polypyramidae; Porospathidae; Tuscaroridae

= Phaeocalpida =

Order of single-celled organisms

Phaeocalpida is an order of cercozoans in the subclass Phaeodaria.
