= Same-sex marriage in Germany =

Same-sex marriage has been legal in Germany since 1 October 2017. A bill for the legalisation of same-sex marriage passed the Bundestag on 30 June 2017 and the Bundesrat on 7 July. It was signed into law on 20 July by President Frank-Walter Steinmeier and published in the Federal Law Gazette on 28 July 2017. Previously, the governing CDU/CSU had refused to legislate on the issue of same-sex marriage. In June 2017, Chancellor Angela Merkel unexpectedly said she hoped the matter would be put to a conscience vote. Consequently, other party leaders organised for a vote to be held in the last week of June during the final legislative session before summer recess. The Bundestag passed the legislation on 30 June by 393 votes to 226, and it went into force on 1 October. Polling suggests that a significant majority of Germans support the legal recognition of same-sex marriage. Germany was the first country in Central Europe, the fourteenth in Europe and the 22nd in the world to allow same-sex couples to marry nationwide.

From 2001 until 2017, Germany recognized registered life partnerships for same-sex couples. The benefits granted by these partnerships were gradually extended by the Federal Constitutional Court throughout several rulings until they provided for most, but not all, of the rights of marriage.

== Registered life partnerships ==
=== First and second Schröder governments ===
The Act on Registered Life Partnerships (German: Gesetz über die Eingetragene Lebenspartnerschaft, or Lebenspartnerschaftsgesetz for short) was a compromise between proponents of same-sex marriage and the two major conservative parties. The act established registered life partnerships (German: eingetragene Lebenspartnerschaft, pronounced [ˈaɪ̯nɡəˌtʁaːɡənə ˈleːbm̩sˌpaʁtnɐʃaft]) (Note: In Germany's minority languages: Bavarian: Lemspartnaschoft, pronounced [ˈleːmsˌb̥ɑːd̥nɐʃɔfd̥]; Low German: Levenspartnerschop, pronounced [ˈlɛːm̩sˌpaːtnɐʃop]; Danish: registreret partnerskab, pronounced [ʁekiˈstʁeˀð̩ ˈpʰɑːtnɐˌskɛˀp]; Upper Sorbian: žiwjenske partnerstwo, pronounced [ˈʒiwʲɛnskɛ ˈpaʁtnɛʁstwɔ]; Lower Sorbian: žywjeńske partnaŕstwo, pronounced [ˈʒɨvʲɛnʲskʲɛ ˈpartnarʲstwɔ]; North Frisian: laawenspårtnerschap; Saterland Frisian: Líeuwends-Partnerskup, pronounced [ˈliːu̯.ənts ˈpaɐ̯tnɐskʊp]; Romani: civilno partneripe) granting same-sex couples a number of rights enjoyed by married opposite-sex couples. It was drafted by Volker Beck of the Greens and was approved under the First Schröder Cabinet, a coalition government constiting of the Greens and the Social Democratic Party (SPD). The Bundestag approved the law on 10 November 2000, with the government parties voting in favour and the opposition CDU/CSU and the Free Democratic Party (FDP) voting against. President Johannes Rau signed the law on 16 February 2001, and it entered into force on 1 August 2001. The first partnership was registered that same day for Reinhard Lüschow and Heinz Friedrich Haar in Hanover. Previously, the state of Hamburg had passed a partnership law in 1999. The law, which entered into force on 8 April 1999, provided registered partners with some limited state-level rights and benefits, but was repealed in 2005 due to it having become obsolete following the passage of the federal law.

On 17 July 2002, the Federal Constitutional Court upheld the act as constitutional. The court found, unanimously, that the process leading to the law's enactment was constitutional. The 8-member court further ruled, with three dissenting votes, that the substance of the law conforms to the Basic Law (Grundgesetz, the German Constitution), and ruled that these partnerships could be granted equal rights to those given to married couples. The initial law had deliberately withheld certain privileges, such as joint adoption and pension rights for widows and widowers, in an effort to observe the "special protection" which the Constitution provides for marriage and the family. The court determined that the "specialness" of the protection was not in the quantity of protection, but in the obligatory nature of this protection, whereas the protection of registered partnerships was at the Bundestag's discretion. On 12 October 2004, the Bundestag passed the Registered Life Partnership Law (Revision) Act (German: Gesetz zur Überarbeitung des Lebenspartnerschaftsrechts), increasing the rights of registered life partners to include, among others, the possibility of stepchild adoption and simpler alimony and divorce rules, but excluding the same tax benefits as in a marriage. The law took effect on 1 January 2005.

=== Merkel governments ===
In July 2008, the Constitutional Court ruled that a transgender person who transitioned to female, after having been married to a woman for more than 50 years, could remain married to her wife and change her legal gender to female. It gave the Bundestag one year to effect the necessary change in the relevant law. On 22 October 2009, the Constitutional Court ruled that a man whose employer had given him and his registered partner inferior pension benefits on account of him not being married was entitled to the same benefits he would receive were he and his partner married and of opposite sexes. The court's decision mandated equal rights for same-sex registered couples not just regarding pension benefits, but across all rights and responsibilities applying to married couples. On 25 October 2009, the new CDU/CSU-FDP coalition released its government programme, promising to repeal the tax inequality between same-sex life partners and opposite-sex married couples to comply with the Constitutional Court's ruling. However, the government programme did not mention adoption rights.

On 17 August 2010, the Constitutional Court ruled that surviving registered partners are entitled to the same inheritance tax rules as surviving spouses. Previously, surviving marital partners paid 7–30% inheritance tax while surviving registered partners paid 17–50%. On 18 February 2013, the court broadened adoption rights for registered partners. It ruled that a partner must be allowed to adopt the other partner's adopted child, a so-called "successive adoption", and not only a partner's biological child. However, the government did not bring up a vote in Parliament to change the adoption laws before it adjourned in June 2013. The court gave the Bundestag until 30 June 2014 to change the laws. On 6 June 2013, the Constitutional Court ruled that registered partners should have joint tax filing benefits equal to those of married opposite-sex couples. The Bundestag had to change the law retroactively. While the new CDU/CSU-SPD government had to allow successive adoption by June 2014 as required by the 2013 Constitutional Court ruling, the court was expected to rule in 2014 whether registered partners should be allowed to jointly adopt children as well, but dismissed the case in February 2014 on procedural grounds. In March 2014, the coalition government approved a bill to allow successive adoption, with discussion on whether or not to implement full adoption equality. The Bundesrat recommended full adoption equality, and a Bundestag committee held a hearing on the topic. On 22 May, the Bundestag passed the law while rejecting proposals by the Greens for full adoption equality. Another law to grant same-sex couples full tax equality passed unanimously in the Bundestag, finishing the required legal changes following the June 2013 court ruling. In October 2015, the Bundestag approved a government bill modifying a series of laws concerning registered partnerships. It gave registered partners the same rights as married couples in several legal areas; there were, however, no noteworthy changes. The bill passed the Bundesrat in November 2015.

The ability to enter into a registered life partnership was closed off on 1 October 2017. No further partnerships are granted in Germany, and couples may retain their status as registered partners or convert their union into a recognized marriage.

=== Partnership statistics ===
The registered partnership law went into effect on 1 August 2001. By October 2004, 5,000 same-sex couples had registered.

In 2007, there were 15,000 registered couples, two-thirds of whom were male, and by 2010, this number had increased to 23,000 couples. In May 2011, 68,268 people reported being in a registered life partnership. As of the end of 2016, 44,000 registered partnerships had been conducted in Germany; approximately 25,000 (56.8%) were between men, while 19,000 were between women (43.2%).

== Same-sex marriage ==
Laws regarding same-sex partnerships in Europe¹ Marriage Civil union Limited domestic recognition (cohabitation) Unrecognized Constitution limits marriage to opposite-sex couples ¹ May include recent laws or court decisions that have not yet entered into effect.

=== Summary ===
CDU/CSU, the senior member parties of Germany's coalition governments between 2005 and 2021, were historically opposed to the legalisation of same-sex marriage. The Greens, the Social Democratic Party (SPD) and the Left Party support same-sex marriage and voted in June 2012 for a defeated bill to legalise it. The Free Democratic Party (FDP) supports same-sex marriage, though it rejected legislation when it was part of a coalition government with the CDU/CSU between 2009 and 2013. Similarly, the SPD agreed to oppose same-sex marriage when in government with the CDU/CSU between 2013 and 2017. Most parties made agreement on same-sex marriage a condition for joining a coalition government with the CDU/CSU after the 2017 federal election. Since legalization in October 2017, the CDU/CSU has opposed motions to repeal the same-sex marriage law, and mostly considers the matter "settled". In 2020, the Christian Democratic Union (CDU) published a political video supporting same-sex marriage and families, and in 2023 the Christian Social Union in Bavaria (CSU) adopted a party platform supporting same-sex marriage. As of 2023, the Alternative for Germany (AfD) remains the largest party opposed to same-sex marriage.

In German, same-sex marriage is known as gleichgeschlechtliche Ehe (pronounced [ˈɡlaɪ̯çɡəˌʃlɛçtlɪçə ˈeːə]) or more commonly in public discourse as Ehe für alle (pronounced [ˈeːə fyːɐ̯ ˈʔalə]), meaning "marriage for all".

=== Second Merkel Government ===
The opposition Greens released a draft same-sex marriage law in June 2009. In March 2010, the Senate of Berlin announced its intention to introduce a same-sex marriage bill to the Bundesrat, the federal council representing Germany's states. According to the Senate, this proposed law would align with the Federal Constitutional Court's ruling that same-sex couples must be treated equally to heterosexual couples. However, the Bundesrat rejected the bill in September 2010. Only Berlin, Brandenburg, Bremen and North Rhine-Westphalia voted in favour; the remaining 12 states opposed it. In June 2011, following CDU losses in state elections, the Senate of Hamburg also announced its intention to submit a same-sex marriage bill to the Bundesrat.

On 28 June 2012, a Greens motion to legalise same-sex marriage was defeated in the Bundestag by a vote of 260 to 309 with 12 abstentions. The motion sought to grant same-sex couples equal rights in adoption and taxation. Members of the CDU/CSU and the FDP voted against the proposal, while the opposition parties, the Social Democratic Party, the Greens, and The Left, supported it. On 22 March 2013, the Bundesrat passed a bill proposed by 5 states (Hamburg, Lower Saxony, North Rhine-Westphalia, Rhineland-Palatinate and Schleswig-Holstein) to open marriage to same-sex couples. The bill was then submitted to the Bundestag for a vote; however, the ruling coalition remained unchanged from 2012, when the previous proposal had been defeated.

=== Third Merkel Government ===
==== Developments in 2013–2017 ====
Federal elections were held on 22 September 2013, after which a new government coalition was formed. The new Bundestag, inaugurated on 22 October, again consisted of a theoretical majority of parties in favour of same-sex marriage (SPD, The Left and the Greens). The Left immediately introduced a bill to legalise same-sex marriage, but the SPD did not support it so as not to jeopardise negotiations on government formation. Even though the SPD had campaigned on "100% equality" for LGBT people, the coalition agreement between the CDU/CSU and the SPD did not contain any significant change regarding LGBT rights. The Left's bill had its first reading on 19 December 2013 and was subsequently sent to the Legal Affairs Committee for consideration. On 5 June 2015, nine states (Baden-Württemberg, Brandenburg, Bremen, Hamburg, Lower Saxony, North Rhine-Westphalia, Rhineland-Palatinate, Schleswig-Holstein and Thuringia) submitted a same-sex marriage bill to the Bundesrat. The legislation had its first reading on 12 June 2015. In the Bundestag, the Greens submitted another bill on 10 June 2015. It had its first reading on 18 June. On 25 September 2015, the Bundesrat voted to approve the bill proposed by the nine states. The bill moved to the Bundestag where the governing parties (CDU/CSU and SPD) blocked the consideration of all three pending same-sex marriage bills.

In March 2017, the SPD, the junior partner in the coalition government, announced they would press the CDU to legalise same-sex marriage in the face of overwhelming public support. MP Thomas Oppermann said his party would introduce a bill, in addition to the long-pending bills of the Greens, The Left and the one referred from the Bundesrat, but eventually did not do so. On 20 June 2017, the Federal Constitutional Court rejected an application by the Greens for an injunction that would have required the Legal Affairs Committee to forward bills legalising same-sex marriage to lawmakers for a vote during Parliament's last pre-election session. On 17 June 2017, the Greens pledged not to participate in any governing coalition after the 2017 elections unless the legalisation of same-sex marriage was part of the agreement. On 24 June, the Chairman of the Free Democratic Party, Christian Lindner, said he would recommend that his party make a similar commitment, and the following day the SPD made a similar pledge.

==== Bundestag vote and approval ====
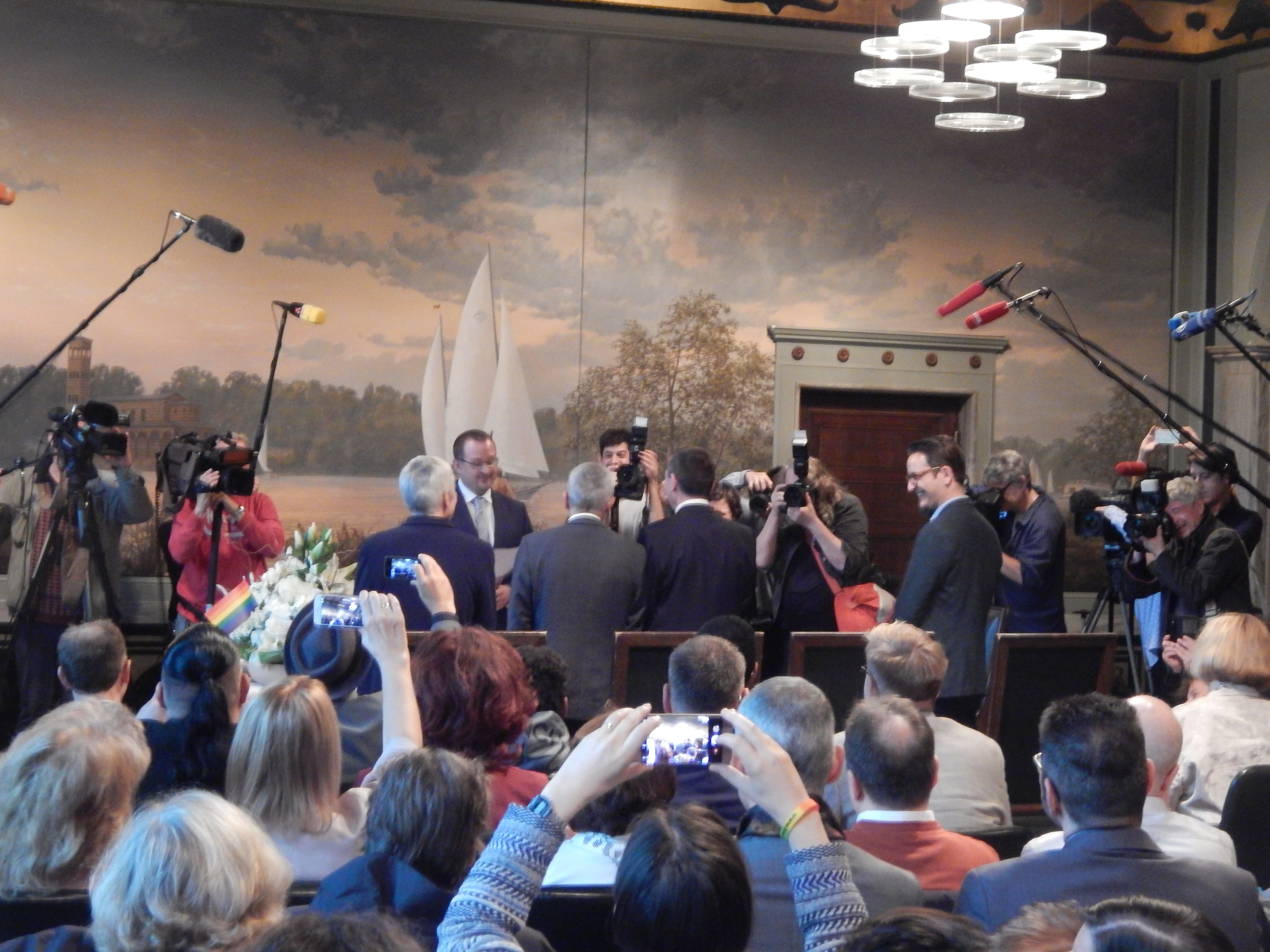
Karl Kreile and Bodo Mende marrying at the Rathaus Schöneberg in Berlin on 1 October 2017, becoming the first same-sex couple to marry in Germany

In late June 2017, whilst answering audience questions at a public forum in Berlin, Chancellor Angela Merkel unexpectedly stated that she hoped the question of same-sex marriage would be put to a conscience vote. This was widely interpreted to mean that she would allow a vote in the Bundestag on the matter without party whip control by the Union parties (CDU/CSU). Shortly after her statement, several politicians, including the Leader of the Social Democratic Party, Martin Schulz, pressured for a vote to be held in the last week of June during the final legislative session before summer recess. On 27 June, both Union parties announced that they would allow their lawmakers a conscience vote, although they opposed a vote being held before the federal election. The SPD de facto breached the coalition agreement and planned on voting with the opposition parties to legalise same-sex marriage. On 28 June, SPD, Green, and Left members of the Legal Affairs Committee voted to schedule a plenary vote on the bill proposed by the Bundesrat in 2015, outvoting CDU/CSU members. The Greens and The Left withdrew their own respective bills.

On 30 June, the Bundestag debated and passed the bill by 393–226 with 4 abstentions and 7 absentees. Merkel herself, whose change of position had led to the vote being held, voted against the legislation, but said she hoped the result "not only promotes respect between the different opinions but also brings more social cohesion and peace". On 7 July, the Bundesrat approved the bill without a vote because there were no requests for changes. The bill was signed into law on 20 July 2017 by President Frank-Walter Steinmeier. It was published on 28 July in the Bundesgesetzblatt and came into force the first day of the third month after publication (i.e. 1 October 2017). Hundreds of same-sex couples were married all over Germany that day, with the first same-sex wedding taking place in Schöneberg, Berlin between Karl Kreile and Bodo Mende.

30 June 2017 vote in the Bundestag
Party	Voted for	Voted against	Abstained	Absent (Did not vote)
G Christian Democratic Union	69: Stephan Albani; Peter Altmaier; Maik Beermann; Sybille Benning; Maria Böhmer; Gitta Connemann; Alexandra Dinges-Dierig; Thomas Gebhart; Cemile Giousouf; Klaus-Dieter Gröhler; Monika Grütters; Herlind Gundelach; Fritz Güntzler; Matthias Hauer; Mark Hauptmann; Mechthild Heil; Mark Helfrich; Marion Herdan; Heribert Hirte; Thorsten Hoffmann; Hendrik Hoppenstedt; Bettina Hornhues; Anette Hübinger; Andreas Jung; Xaver Jung; Stefan Kaufmann; Roderich Kiesewetter; Jürgen Klimke; Rüdiger Kruse; Roy Kühne; Katja Leikert; Ursula von der Leyen; Jan-Marco Luczak; Andreas Mattfeldt; Jan Metzler; Mathias Middelberg; Carsten Müller; Philipp Murmann; Andreas Nick; Ingrid Pahlmann; Martin Pätzold; Anita Schäfer; Nadine Schön; Kristina Schröder; Ole Schröder; Uwe Schummer; Christina Schwarzer; Tino Sorge; Jens Spahn; Peter Stein; Sebastian Steineke; Johannes Steiniger; Dieter Stier; Gero Storjohann; Lena Strothmann; Michael Stübgen; Sabine Sütterlin-Waack; Peter Tauber; Antje Tillmann; Michael Vietz; Johann Wadephul; Kai Wegner; Marcus Weinberg; Sabine Weiss; Karl-Georg Wellmann; Kai Whittaker; Oliver Wittke; Dagmar Wöhrl; Matthias Zimmer	181: Thomas Bareiß; Norbert Barthle; Günter Baumann; Manfred Behrens; Veronika Bellmann; André Berghegger; Christoph Bergner; Ute Bertram; Steffen Bilger; Clemens Binninger; Peter Bleser; Wolfgang Bosbach; Norbert Brackmann; Klaus Brähmig; Michael Brand; Helmut Brandt; Ralf Brauksiepe; Helge Braun; Heike Brehmer; Ralph Brinkhaus; Cajus Julius Caesar; Michael Donth; Thomas Dörflinger; Marie-Luise Dött; Jutta Eckenbach; Hermann Färber; Uwe Feiler; Thomas Feist; Enak Ferlemann; Ingrid Fischbach; Axel Fischer; Dirk Fischer; Maria Flachsbarth; Klaus-Peter Flosbach; Thorsten Frei; Michael Fuchs; Hans-Joachim Fuchtel; Alexander Funk; Ingo Gädechens; Alois Gerig; Eberhard Gienger; Ursula Groden-Kranich; Hermann Gröhe; Michael Grosse-Brömer; Astrid Grotelüschen; Markus Grübel; Manfred Grund; Oliver Grundmann; Olav Gutting; Christian Haase; Rainer Hajek; Stephan Harbarth; Jürgen Hardt; Stefan Heck; Matthias Heider; Helmut Heiderich; Frank Heinrich; Jörg Hellmuth; Rudolf Henke; Michael Hennrich; Ansgar Heveling; Christian Hirte; Robert Hochbaum; Franz-Josef Holzenkamp; Margaret Horb; Mathias Edwin Höschel; Charles M. Huber; Hubert Hüppe; Thomas Jarzombek; Sylvia Jörrißen; Franz Josef Jung; Egon Jüttner; Hans-Werner Kammer; Steffen Kanitz; Anja Karliczek; Bernhard Kaster; Volker Kauder; Ronja Kemmer; Georg Kippels; Volkmar Klein; Axel Knoerig; Jens Koeppen; Markus Koob; Carsten Körber; Hartmut Koschyk; Kordula Kovac; Michael Kretschmer; Gunther Krichbaum; Günter Krings; Bettina Kudla; Günter Lach; Uwe Lagosky; Karl A. Lamers; Andreas Lämmel; Norbert Lammert; Katharina Landgraf; Philipp Lengsfeld; Antje Lezius; Matthias Lietz; Carsten Linnemann; Patricia Lips; Wilfried Lorenz; Claudia Lücking-Michel; Karin Maag; Yvonne Magwas; Thomas Mahlberg; Thomas de Maizière; Gisela Manderla; Matern von Marschall; Hans-Georg von der Marwitz; Michael Meister; Angela Merkel; Maria Michalk; Dietrich Monstadt; Karsten Möring; Elisabeth Motschmann; Gerd Müller; Michaela Noll; Helmut Nowak; Wilfried Oellers; Tim Ostermann; Henning Otte; Sylvia Pantel; Martin Patzelt; Ulrich Petzold; Joachim Pfeiffer; Sibylle Pfeiffer; Eckhard Pols; Thomas Rachel; Kerstin Radomski; Eckhardt Rehberg; Lothar Riebsamen; Josef Rief; Heinz Riesenhuber; Iris Ripsam; Johannes Röring; Kathrin Rösel; Norbert Röttgen; Erwin Rüddel; Wolfgang Schäuble; Karl Schiewerling; Jana Schimke; Norbert Schindler; Tankred Schipanski; Gabriele Schmidt; Patrick Schnieder; Bernhard Schulte-Drüggelte; Klaus-Peter Schulze; Armin Schuster; Detlef Seif; Johannes Selle; Reinhold Sendker; Patrick Sensburg; Bernd Siebert; Carola Stauche; Frank Steffel; Albert Stegemann; Christian von Stetten; Rita Stockhofe; Karin Strenz; Thomas Stritzl; Astrid Timmermann-Fechter; Arnold Vaatz; Thomas Viesehon; Volkmar Vogel; Sven Volmering; Christel Voßbeck-Kayser; Kees de Vries; Marco Wanderwitz; Karl-Heinz Wange; Nina Warken; Peter Weiß; Ingo Wellenreuther; Marian Wendt; Waldemar Westermayer; Peter Wichtel; Annette Widmann-Mauz; Heinz Wiese; Klaus-Peter Willsch; Barbara Woltmann; Heinrich Zertik	3: Uda Heller; Albert Weiler; Elisabeth Winkelmeier-Becker	3: Peter Beyer; Volker Mosblech; Oswin Veith
G Social Democratic Party	192: Niels Annen; Ingrid Arndt-Brauer; Rainer Arnold; Heike Baehrens; Ulrike Bahr; Bettina Bähr-Losse; Heinz-Joachim Barchmann; Katarina Barley; Doris Barnett; Klaus Barthel; Matthias Bartke; Sören Bartol; Bärbel Bas; Uwe Beckmeyer; Lothar Binding; Burkhard Blienert; Willi Brase; Karl-Heinz Brunner; Edelgard Bulmahn; Marco Bülow; Martin Burkert; Lars Castellucci; Jürgen Coße; Petra Crone; Bernhard Daldrup; Daniela De Ridder; Karamba Diaby; Sabine Dittmar; Martin Dörmann; Elvira Drobinski-Weiß; Siegmund Ehrmann; Michaela Engelmeier; Gernot Erler; Petra Ernstberger; Saskia Esken; Karin Evers-Meyer; Johannes Fechner; Fritz Felgentreu; Elke Ferner; Ute Finckh-Krämer; Christian Flisek; Gabriele Fograscher; Edgar Franke; Ulrich Freese; Dagmar Freitag; Sigmar Gabriel; Michael Gerdes; Martin Gerster; Iris Gleicke; Angelika Glöckner; Ulrike Gottschalck; Kerstin Griese; Gabriele Groneberg; Michael Groß; Uli Grötsch; Bettina Hagedorn; Rita Hagl-Kehl; Metin Hakverdi; Ulrich Hampel; Michael Hartmann; Sebastian Hartmann; Dirk Heidenblut; Hubertus Heil; Gabriela Heinrich; Marcus Held; Wolfgang Hellmich; Barbara Hendricks; Heidtrud Henn; Gustav Herzog; Gabriele Hiller-Ohm; Thomas Hitschler; Eva Högl; Matthias Ilgen; Christina Jantz; Frank Junge; Josip Juratovic; Thomas Jurk; Oliver Kaczmarek; Johannes Kahrs; Ralf Kapschack; Gabriele Katzmarek; Ulrich Kelber; Marina Kermer; Cansel Kiziltepe; Arno Klare; Lars Klingbeil; Bärbel Kofler; Daniela Kolbe; Birgit Kömpel; Anette Kramme; Hans-Ulrich Krüger; Angelika Krüger-Leißner; Helga Kühn-Mengel; Christine Lambrecht; Christian Lange; Karl Lauterbach; Steffen-Claudio Lemme; Burkhard Lischka; Gabriele Lösekrug-Möller; Hiltrud Lotze; Kirsten Lühmann; Birgit Malecha-Nissen; Caren Marks; Katja Mast; Hilde Mattheis; Matthias Miersch; Klaus Mindrup; Susanne Mittag; Bettina Müller; Detlef Müller; Michelle Müntefering; Rolf Mützenich; Andrea Nahles; Dietmar Nietan; Ulli Nissen; Thomas Oppermann; Mahmut Özdemir; Aydan Özoğuz; Markus Paschke; Christian Petry; Jeannine Pflugradt; Detlev Pilger; Sabine Poschmann; Joachim Poß; Achim Post; Florian Post; Wilhelm Priesmeier; Florian Pronold; Sascha Raabe; Simone Raatz; Martin Rabanus; Mechthild Rawert; Stefan Rebmann; Gerold Reichenbach; Carola Reimann; Andreas Rimkus; Sönke Rix; Petra Rode-Bosse; Dennis Rohde; Martin Rosemann; René Röspel; Ernst Dieter Rossmann; Michael Roth; Susann Rüthrich; Bernd Rützel; Sarah Ryglewski; Johann Saathoff; Annette Sawade; Hans-Joachim Schabedoth; Axel Schäfer; Nina Scheer; Marianne Schieder; Udo Schiefner; Dorothee Schlegel; Dagmar Schmidt; Matthias Schmidt; Ulla Schmidt; Carsten Schneider; Elfi Scho-Antwerpes; Ursula Schulte; Swen Schulz; Ewald Schurer; Frank Schwabe; Stefan Schwartze; Stefan Schwartze; Andreas Schwarz; Rita Schwarzelühr-Sutter; Rainer Spiering; Norbert Spinrath; Svenja Stadler; Martina Stamm-Fibich; Sonja Steffen; Christoph Strässer; Kerstin Tack; Claudia Tausend; Michael Thews; Karin Thissen; Franz Thönnes; Carsten Träger; Rüdiger Veit; Ute Vogt; Dirk Vöpel; Bernd Westphal; Andrea Wicklein; Dirk Wiese; Waltraud Wolff; Gülistan Yüksel; Dagmar Ziegler; Stefan Zierke; Jens Zimmermann; Manfred Zöllmer; Brigitte Zypries	–	–	1: Wolfgang Gunkel
The Left	63: Jan van Aken; Dietmar Bartsch; Herbert Behrens; Karin Binder; Matthias Birkwald; Heidrun Bluhm; Christine Buchholz; Eva Bulling-Schröter; Roland Claus; Sevim Dağdelen; Diether Dehm; Klaus Ernst; Wolfgang Gehrcke; Nicole Gohlke; Annette Groth; Gregor Gysi; André Hahn; Heike Hänsel; Rosemarie Hein; Inge Höger; Andrej Hunko; Sigrid Hupach; Ulla Jelpke; Susanna Karawanskij; Kerstin Kassner; Katja Kipping; Jan Korte; Jutta Krellmann; Katrin Kunert; Caren Lay; Sabine Leidig; Ralph Lenkert; Michael Leutert; Stefan Liebich; Gesine Lötzsch; Thomas Lutze; Birgit Menz; Cornelia Möhring; Niema Movassat; Norbert Müller; Alexander Neu; Thomas Nord; Petra Pau; Harald Petzold; Richard Pitterle; Martina Renner; Michael Schlecht; Petra Sitte; Kersten Steinke; Kirsten Tackmann; Azize Tank; Frank Tempel; Alexander Ulrich; Kathrin Vogler; Sahra Wagenknecht; Halina Wawzyniak; Harald Weinberg; Katrin Werner; Birgit Wöllert; Jörn Wunderlich; Hubertus Zdebel; Pia-Beate Zimmermann; Sabine Zimmermann	–	–	1: Axel Troost
Alliance 90/The Greens	63: Luise Amtsberg; Kerstin Andreae; Annalena Baerbock; Marieluise Beck; Volker Beck; Franziska Brantner; Agnieszka Brugger; Ekin Deligöz; Katja Dörner; Katharina Dröge; Harald Ebner; Thomas Gambke; Matthias Gastel; Kai Gehring; Katrin Göring-Eckardt; Anja Hajduk; Britta Haßelmann; Anton Hofreiter; Bärbel Höhn; Dieter Janecek; Uwe Kekeritz; Katja Keul; Sven-Christian Kindler; Maria Klein-Schmeink; Tom Koenigs; Sylvia Kotting-Uhl; Oliver Krischer; Christian Kühn; Stephan Kühn; Renate Künast; Markus Kurth; Monika Lazar; Steffi Lemke; Tobias Lindner; Nicole Maisch; Peter Meiwald; Irene Mihalic; Beate Müller-Gemmeke; Özcan Mutlu; Konstantin von Notz; Omid Nouripour; Friedrich Ostendorff; Cem Özdemir; Elisabeth Paus; Brigitte Pothmer; Tabea Rößner; Claudia Roth; Corinna Rüffer; Manuel Sarrazin; Elisabeth Scharfenberg; Ursula Schauws; Gerhard Schick; Frithjof Schmidt; Kordula Schulz-Asche; Wolfgang Strengmann-Kuhn; Hans-Christian Ströbele; Harald Terpe; Markus Tressel; Jürgen Trittin; Julia Verlinden; Doris Wagner; Beate Walter-Rosenheimer; Valerie Wilms	–	–	–
G Christian Social Union in Bavaria	6: Bernd Fabritius; Astrid Freudenstein; Hans Michelbach; Wolfgang Stefinger; Tobias Zech; Gudrun Zollner	44: Katrin Albsteiger; Artur Auernhammer; Dorothee Bär; Reinhard Brandl; Alexander Dobrindt; Hansjörg Durz; Iris Eberl; Hans-Peter Friedrich; Michael Frieser; Josef Göppel; Florian Hahn; Gerda Hasselfeldt; Alexander Hoffmann; Karl Holmeier; Erich Irlstorfer; Bartholomäus Kalb; Alois Karl; Ulrich Lange; Barbara Lanzinger; Paul Lehrieder; Andreas Lenz; Philipp Graf Lerchenfeld; Andrea Lindholz; Daniela Ludwig; Stephan Mayer; Reiner Meier; Stefan Müller; Georg Nüßlein; Julia Obermeier; Florian Oßner; Alexander Radwan; Alois Rainer; Peter Ramsauer; Albert Rupprecht; Andreas Scheuer; Christian Schmidt; Thomas Silberhorn; Johannes Singhammer; Stephan Stracke; Max Straubinger; Hans-Peter Uhl; Volker Ullrich; Anja Weisgerber; Emmi Zeulner	1: Silke Launert	2: Marlene Mortler; Matthäus Strebl
Independent	–	1: Erika Steinbach	–	–
Total	393	226	4	7
Total	62.4%	35.9%	0.6%	1.1%

The same-sex marriage law was short; it added the following sentence to Article 1353 of the Bürgerliches Gesetzbuch: Marriage may be entered into for life by two persons of different sex or of the same sex. (Note: German: Die Ehe wird von zwei Personen verschiedenen oder gleichen Geschlechts auf Lebenszeit geschlossen.)

==== Reactions and subsequent changes ====
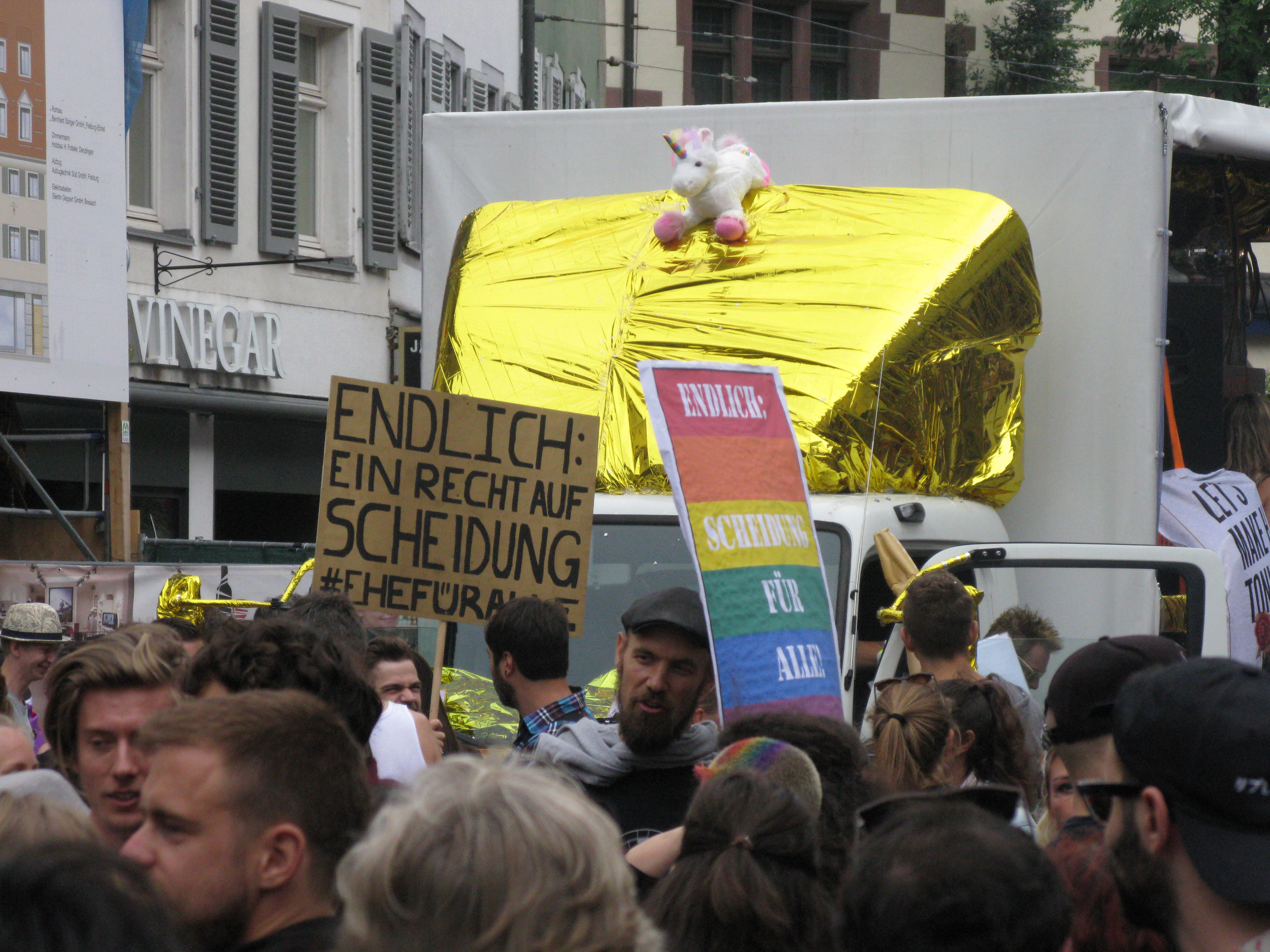
Demonstration in favour of same-sex marriage in Freiburg im Breisgau, July 2017

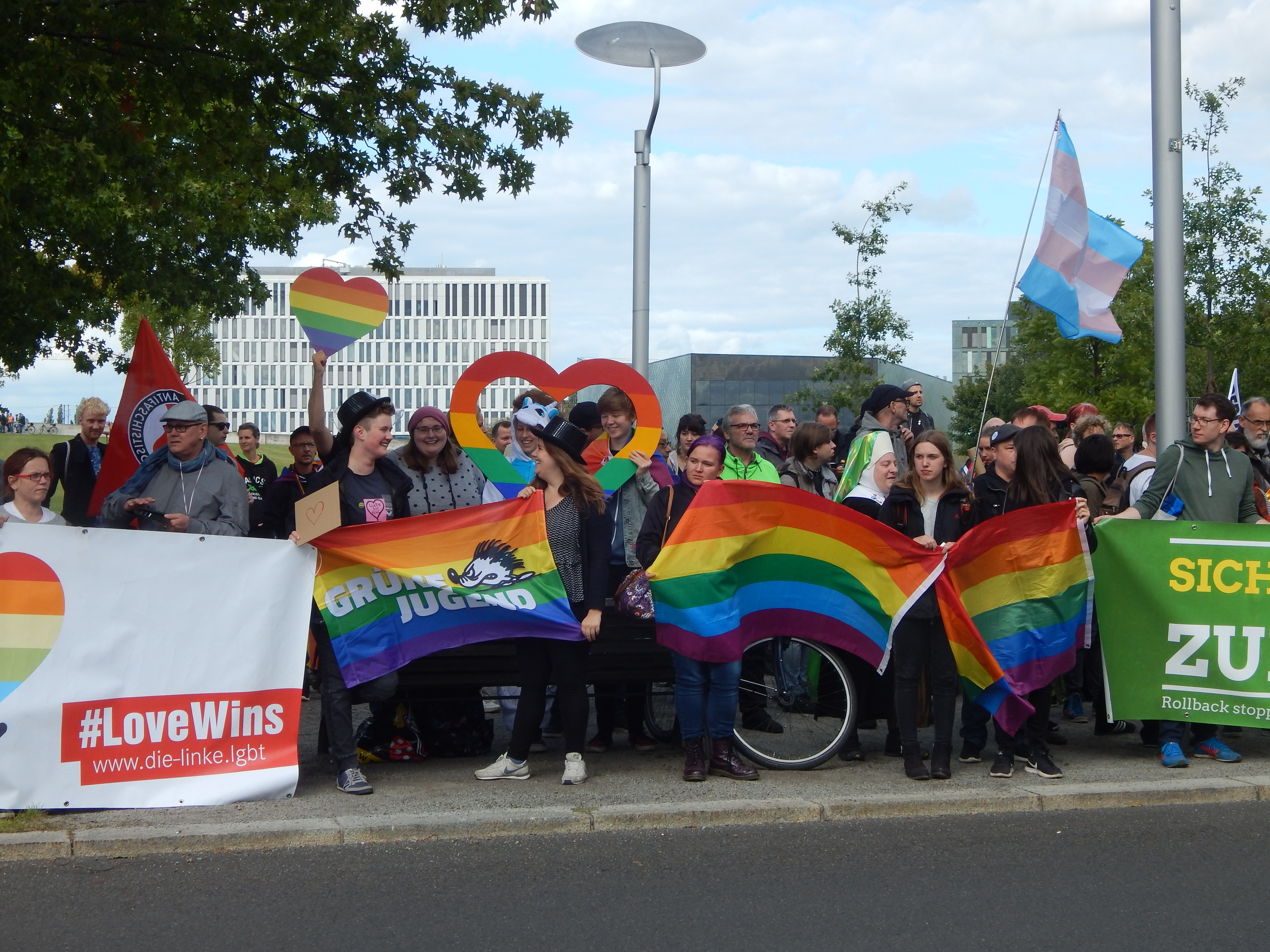
Supporters of same-sex marriage protesting in front of the German Chancellery building in Berlin, 15 September 2017

Several legal experts, including MPs and party leaders, raised doubts about the legality of the law, with the former President of the Federal Constitutional Court, Hans-Jürgen Papier, arguing that same-sex marriage is inconsistent with previous definitions of marriage espoused by the court. Article 6(1) of the Constitution places "marriage and family" under the "special protection of the state order". An amendment to the Constitution requires a two-thirds majority in both chambers of Parliament. These concerns were dismissed by Justice Minister Heiko Maas, who argued that Article 6(1) neither defines the term "marriage" nor rules out a wider definition. Following the passage of the law, the Bavarian Government and the Alternative for Germany (AfD) party both said they would consider petitioning the court for a judicial review (abstrakte Normenkontrolle). However, the AfD lacked legal standing to bring a challenge, as it was not part of the federal government nor any state government. It also did not have any representation in the Bundestag at the time, and did not reach the necessary quarter of Bundestag members in the 2017 election. On 6 March 2018, the Bavarian Government announced it would not challenge the law, after commissioned assessments found its chances to be successful as low.

In September 2018, nearly a year after legalization, the AfD introduced a motion to the Bundestag to abolish same-sex marriage. The measure was rejected on 11 October, with every other political party opposing the motion. Several Green and CDU/CSU lawmakers instead congratulated the thousands of same-sex couples who had married in Germany in the past year, while other MPs criticised the AfD for their proposal, calling it "undemocratic", "wrong", "a cheap political trick at the expense of free society" or even "lazy as hell". In June 2019, the AfD re-introduced a motion to repeal the same-sex marriage law in both the Legal Affairs Committee and the Family Committee. The proposal was rejected by every other political party. The CDU/CSU stated that "the constitutional concept of marriage is open to same-sex couples". The Social Democrats criticized the AfD for trying to "reopen a completed constitutional debate", while the FDP criticized that a renewed marriage ban for same-sex couples would "reduce their freedom". The Left considered the AfD draft to be a "deliberate provocation aimed at denying equal rights to sexual minorities", and the Greens pointed out that there is "broad political and social majority" support for same-sex marriage. That same month, the AfD presented a motion to the Landtag of Schleswig-Holstein to force the state government to challenge the same-sex marriage law at the Federal Constitutional Court. The motion was unsuccessful and opposed by every other political party in the Landtag.

In December 2018, the German Parliament passed legislation amending several laws to reflect the legalisation of same-sex marriage, including with regard to the recognition of foreign same-sex marriages and the conversions of registered life partnerships to marriages.

=== Marriage statistics ===
According to the Federal Statistical Office of Germany, 102,544 same-sex marriages had taken place in Germany by the end of 2025.

Number of marriages performed in Germany
Year	Same-sex marriages			Opposite-sex marriages	Total marriages	% same-sex
Year	Male	Female	Total	Opposite-sex marriages	Total marriages	% same-sex
2017 (Note: since October)	6,080	5,067	11,147	92,209	103,356	12.1%
2018	10,686	11,071	21,757	449,466	482,370	4.51%
2019	6,815	7,206	14,021	416,324	430,345	3.37%
2020	4,663	5,276	9,939	373,304	383,243	2.66%
2021	4,068	4,642	8,710	349,075	357,785	2.43%
2022	4,664	5,379	10,043	380,700	390,743	2.57%
2023	4,319	4,909	9,226	351,766	360,992	2.55%
2024	4,112	4,706	8,818	340,398	349,216	2.53%
2025	4,198	4,685	8,883	339,929	348,813	2.55%

680 same-sex couples married in Berlin from October to the end of December 2017; 181 in Tempelhof-Schöneberg, 100 in Charlottenburg-Wilmersdorf and 97 in Friedrichshain-Kreuzberg, while the remaining couples married in the 9 other boroughs. During these three months, same-sex marriages accounted for 18.4% of all marriages performed in Berlin. 168 same-sex marriages were performed in Stuttgart from October to December 2017, with most being conversions from registered partnerships. In Mannheim, 135 same-sex couples were married between October 2017 and February 2018, with all but 16 of these marriages being conversions from registered partnerships. In Freiburg im Breisgau, 46 same-sex couples had married by February 2018.

By the end of March 2018, more than 1,000 same-sex marriages had taken place in Berlin (four boroughs did not publish their marriage statistics, leaving incomplete data), 900 in Hamburg, 644 in Cologne, 477 in Munich, 216 in Frankfurt, 192 in Düsseldorf, 180 in Dortmund and 158 in Hannover. Most were conversions from registered partnerships. 2,540 same-sex marriages were performed in Berlin between 1 October 2017 and 31 December 2018, constituting 16.2% of the total 15,660 marriages. Of these, 1,637 (64%) were between two men and 903 (36%) were between two women, while 1,551 (61%) were converted registered life partnerships. In Brandenburg, 903 same-sex marriages were performed in the same time period, constituting 5.9% of the total 15,440 marriages. 481 (53%) were between two women and 422 (47%) were between two men, while 550 (61%) were converted registered partnerships.

=== Religious performance ===
==== Background and summary ====
Same-sex marriage remains a controversial topic among Germany's largest religious organisations: the Protestant Church and the Roman Catholic Church. The Catholic Church does not permit same-sex marriages in its places of worship, while most member churches of the Protestant Church allow their clergy to officiate at same-sex marriages. Some smaller religious denominations also permit same-sex marriages. The synod of the Catholic Diocese of the Old Catholics in Germany voted in November 2021 to bless and perform same-sex marriages in its churches, removing all distinctions between same-sex and opposite-sex partners in canon law and liturgical matters. It had already allowed for the blessing of same-sex registered partnerships since 2003. In November 2022, the United Methodist Church in Germany voted to allow blessings of same-sex marriages. Some Jewish, and Buddhist groups also perform same-sex marriages.

The New Apostolic Church has authorised blessings of same-sex registered partnerships since 2011. The couple may receive a "prayer of blessing", but this differs from the classical wedding blessing. Before this, a same-sex couple had received a blessing in Velbert in 2009.

==== Protestant Church ====
The Protestant Church consists of twenty Lutheran, Reformed and United Protestant regional churches, encompassing the vast majority of Germany's Protestants. All twenty churches allow their clergy to bless same-sex relationships. Several also perform same-sex marriages in their places of worship: the Evangelical Church in the Rhineland (2016), the Protestant Church in Baden (2016), the Evangelical Church in Berlin, Brandenburg and Silesian Upper Lusatia (2016), the Evangelical Reformed Church in Germany (2017), the Evangelical Church of Bremen (2018), the Evangelical Church of Hesse Electorate-Waldeck (2018), the Evangelical Lutheran Church in Oldenburg (2018), the Protestant Church in Hesse and Nassau (2019), the Evangelical-Lutheran Church of Hanover (2019), the Evangelical Church of the Palatinate (2019), the Church of Lippe (2019), the Evangelical Lutheran Church in Northern Germany (2019), the Evangelical Church of Westphalia (2020), the Evangelical Lutheran Church in Brunswick (2022), and the Evangelical Lutheran Church in Bavaria (2025). The Evangelical Church in Central Germany allows same-sex marriages to be performed in its churches but only if the local municipality agrees.

On 14 August 2016, despite the lack of legal recognition for same-sex marriages, two men were married at St. Mary's Church in Berlin by two Protestant pastors, the first same-sex marriage performed in a German church. Marriages of same-sex couples are entered into the official church register. Pastors are under no obligation to perform same-sex marriages if this would violate their personal beliefs.

==== Catholic Church ====
Although the Catholic Church officially opposes same-sex marriages, several Catholic priests have been secretly blessing same-sex relationships for years, notably in the Diocese of Aachen where five same-sex couples received a blessing in Mönchengladbach in 2003. In 2007, a same-sex couple also received a blessing in Wetzlar in the Diocese of Limburg. In May 2015, the Central Committee of German Catholics voted in favour of the blessing of same-sex unions. Several bishops have expressed their support for the blessings of same-sex relationships, including bishops Helmut Dieser, Franz-Josef Hermann Bode, Peter Kohlgraf, Georg Bätzing, Heinrich Timmerevers and Bertram Meier. In May 2021, in response to the Holy See reiterating a ban on blessing same-sex unions, some 120 priests decided to publicly defy the ban and bless several couples. Among them, Father Jan Korditschke decided to bless a member in his congregation whose partner had recently died, stating "How can you not bless - sorry, I'm getting emotional - a person in mourning after a long-term relationship? Should I say you should be grateful you got rid of this sinful love?". A 2015 survey conducted by the Free University of Berlin and the University of Münster showed that 70% of German Catholics supported church blessings for same-sex relationships.

In March 2023, the Synodal Path of the German Catholic Church voted in support of blessing same-sex couples. "Often same-sex couples and remarried divorcees have experienced exclusion and depreciation in our Church. The possibility of publicly placing their partnership under God's blessing does not make up for these experiences. However, it offers the Church the opportunity to show appreciation for the love and values that exist in these relationships and thus ask for forgiveness and make reconciliation possible." The move was approved by a vote of 176–14 with 12 abstentions by the Synodal Path. Shortly following the vote, the dioceses of Osnabrück, Essen, and Speyer, as well as the Archdiocese of Berlin, announced that their clergy could bless same-sex couples. In December 2023, the Holy See published Fiducia supplicans, a declaration allowing Catholic priests to bless couples who are not considered to be married according to church teaching, including the blessing of same-sex couples. The declaration was welcomed by several bishops. Bätzing said he was "grateful", "The declaration Fiducia supplicans addresses the issues that have become apparent in the recent past around the topics of requests for blessing and blessings from a pastoral perspective and in a theologically moderate and calm language. The declaration applies theological categories and terms in a responsible manner. It draws a clear line between unwavering fidelity to the teachings of the Church and the pastoral requirements of an ecclesial practice that wants to be close to people. A pastoral scope for action is described here, which illustrates responsible Church practice." The Bishop of Passau, Stefan Oster, said the declaration could "help us in the polarized debates on this issue", "As a Catholic Church, in the pastoral walk with these people we usually have a great deficit of understanding, and all too often almost no ability to communicate in the care of souls. Now the scope for a shared pastoral path is widening." In April 2025, the German Bishops' Conference published guidelines for blessing same-sex unions. In April 2026, Cardinal Reinhard Marx, the Archbishop of Munich and Freising, instructed priests and pastoral staff in his archdiocese to refer to the guidelines of the Bishops' Conference for pastoral care, as a means to "strengthen the practice of blessing the partnerships of divorced and remarried couples, couples of all gender identities and sexual orientations as well as couples who for other reasons do not want to or cannot receive the sacrament of marriage."

== Public opinion ==
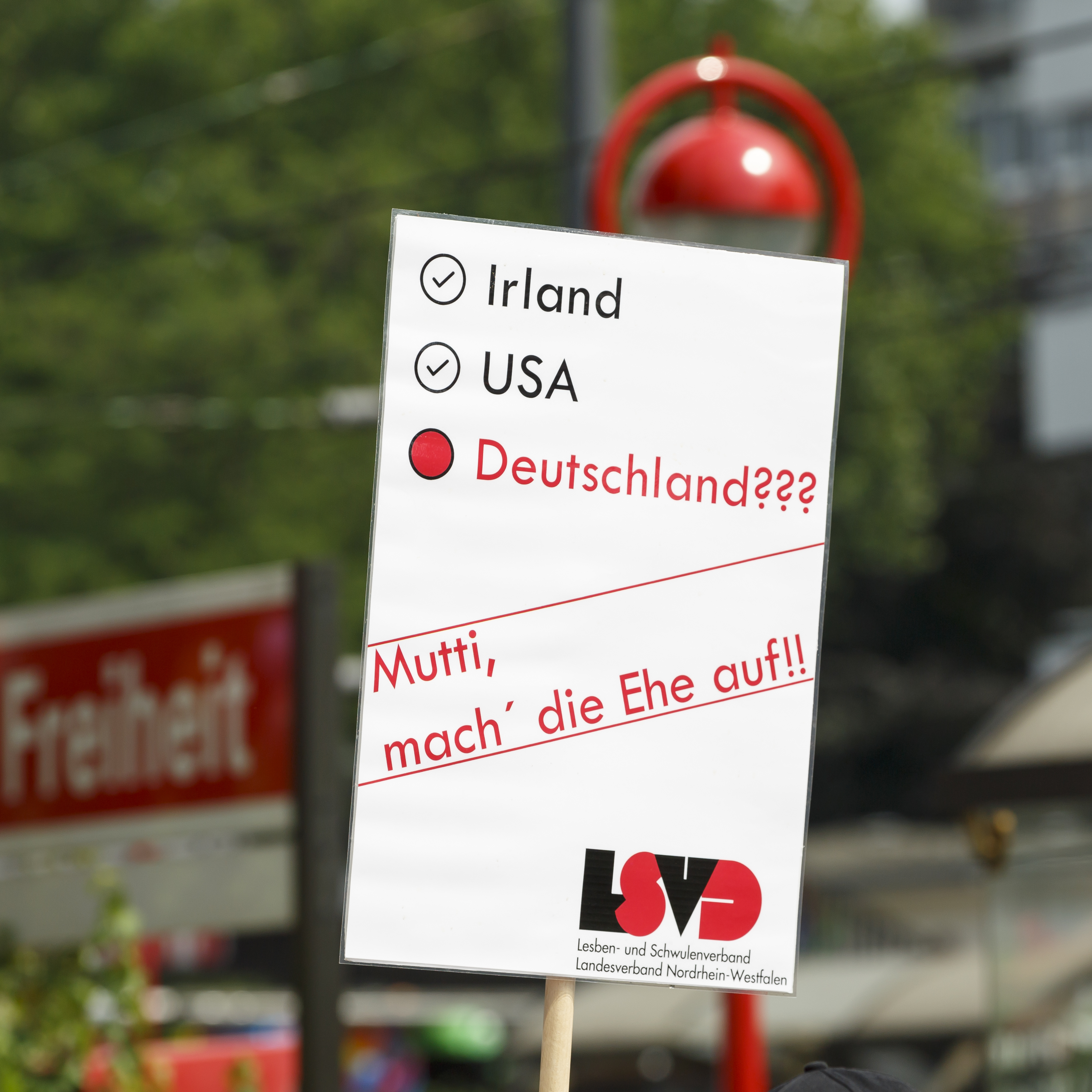
Protest sign at Cologne Pride calling on Chancellor Angela Merkel (often referred to by the moniker "Mutti Merkel") to support the legalisation of same-sex marriage, July 2015

Support for same-sex marriage among 18–21-year-olds according to a 2016 survey from the Varkey Foundation

The 2006 Eurobarometer, seeking public attitudes on economic, political, and social issues for member states of the European Union, found that Germany ranked seventh supporting same-sex marriage with 52% popular support. German support for same-sex marriage was above the European Union average of 44%.

In January 2013, a poll conducted by YouGov found that German support for same-sex marriage was 66%, with 24% opposed and 10% undecided. Support for adoption by same-sex couples was 59%, with 31% opposed and 11% undecided. A survey conducted the following month by RTL Television and Stern magazine found that 74% of Germans were supportive of same-sex marriage, with 23% against. Support was recorded to be strongest among Green and Social Democratic (SPD) voters, but even among voters of Chancellor Angela Merkel's governing Christian Democrats (CDU) almost two-thirds were in favour. A May 2013 Ipsos poll found that 67% of respondents were in favour of same-sex marriage and another 12% supported other forms of recognition for same-sex couples. A poll conducted that same month by Ifop showed that 74% of Germans supported allowing same-sex couples to marry and adopt children.

According to an October 2013 poll by TNS Emnid, 70% supported full legal equality of registered partnerships and marriage.

According to a May 2015 poll by YouGov, 65% of Germans supported same-sex marriage (by party: 57% of CDU/CSU voters, 79% of SPD voters, 68% of The Left voters and 94% of Green voters), while 28% opposed allowing same-sex couples to marry and 7% were undecided. Support rose to 75% among 18–24-year-olds, but fell to 60% among those aged 55 and over. By religion, support was 64% among Catholics and 63% among Protestants. Support for adoption by same-sex couples was 57%, with 35% opposed and 8% undecided. The 2015 Eurobarometer found that 66% of Germans thought same-sex marriage should be allowed throughout Europe, while 29% were opposed. A May 2015 poll by TNS Emnid found that 64% of Germans supported same-sex marriage (by party: 63% of CDU/CSU voters, 77% of SPD voters, 63% of FDP voters, 62% of The Left voters, 89% of Green voters and 14% of AfD voters), while 31% were opposed and 5% were undecided. A poll conducted the following month by INSA showed that 65% of Germans supported same-sex marriage (by party: 58% of CDU/CSU voters, 75% of SPD voters, 72% of The Left voters, 79% of Green voters, 65% of FDP voters, and 42% of AfD voters). A September–October 2016 survey by the Varkey Foundation found that 82% of 18–21-year-olds supported same-sex marriage in Germany.

In January 2017, a study by Germany's Federal Anti-Discrimination Agency indicated that 83% of Germans were in favour of same-sex marriage. A June 2017 ZDF poll found that 73% of Germans supported same-sex marriage, including 95% of Green voters, 82% of SPD voters, 81% of The Left voters, 64% of CDU/CSU voters, 63% of FDP voters, and 55% of AfD voters. A Pew Research Center poll, conducted between April and August 2017 and published in May 2018, showed that 75% of Germans supported same-sex marriage, 23% were opposed and 2% did not know or had refused to answer. When divided by religion, 86% of religiously unaffiliated people, 82% of non-practicing Christians and 53% of church-attending Christians supported same-sex marriage. Opposition was 15% among 18–34-year-olds.

The 2019 Eurobarometer found that 84% of Germans thought same-sex marriage should be allowed throughout Europe, while 12% were opposed. A Pew Research Center poll conducted between February and May 2023 showed that 80% of Germans supported same-sex marriage, 18% were opposed and 2% did not know or had refused to answer. When divided by political affiliation, support was highest among those on the left of the political spectrum at 86%, followed by those at the center at 80% and those on the right at 74%. Women (85%) were also more likely to support same-sex marriage than men (74%). The 2023 Eurobarometer showed that support was similar, at 84%, while 13% were opposed. The survey also found that 84% of Germans thought that "there is nothing wrong in a sexual relationship between two persons of the same sex", while 13% disagreed.

== See also ==
- Marriage in Germany
- LGBT rights in Germany
- LGBT rights in the European Union
- Recognition of same-sex unions in Europe
