= List of members of the 18th Bundestag =

18th Bundestag
←	17th	19th	→
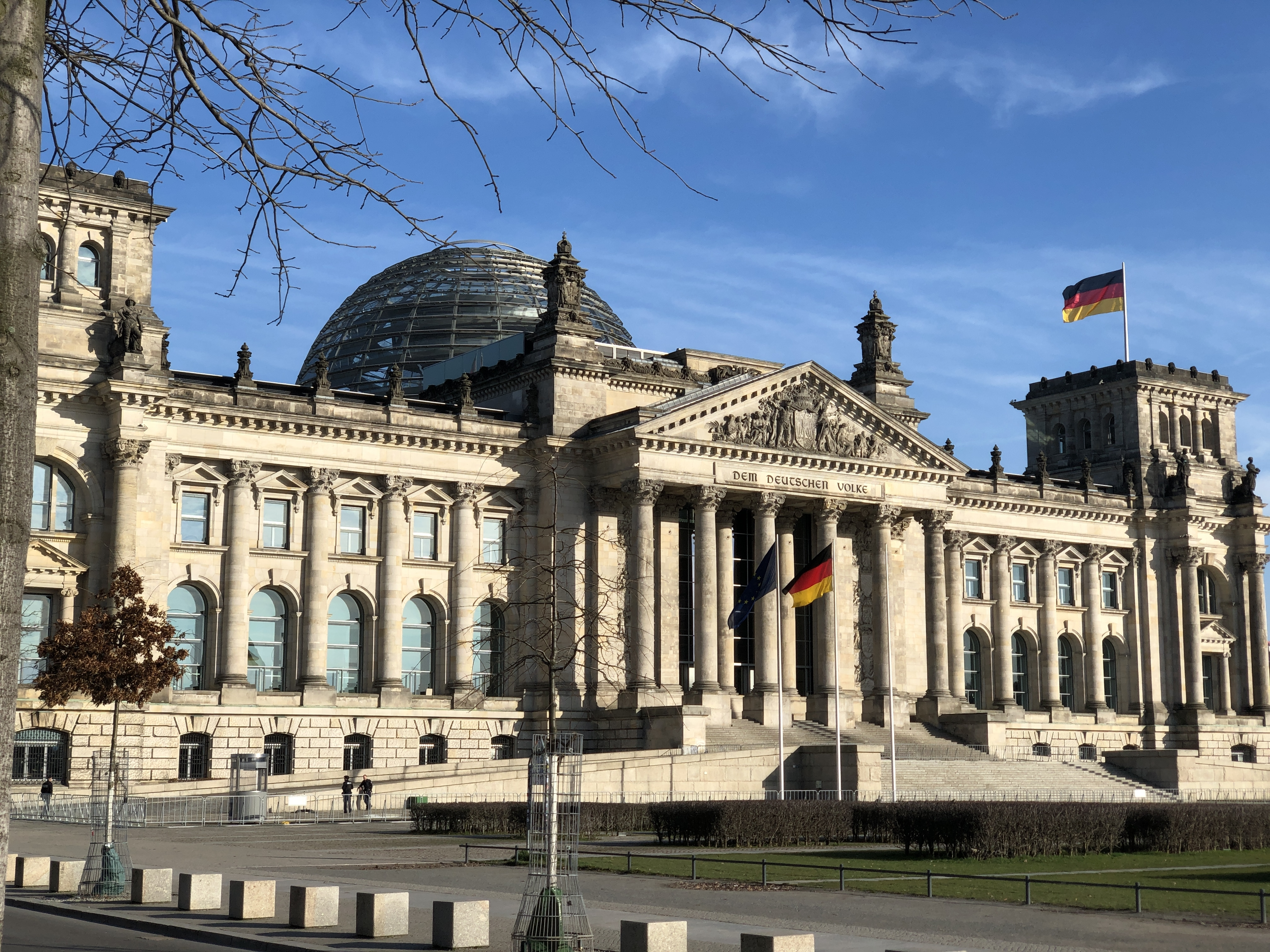
- Reichstag building in 2020

Overview
- Legislative body: Bundestag
- Jurisdiction: Germany
- Meeting place: Reichstag building, Berlin

Bundestag
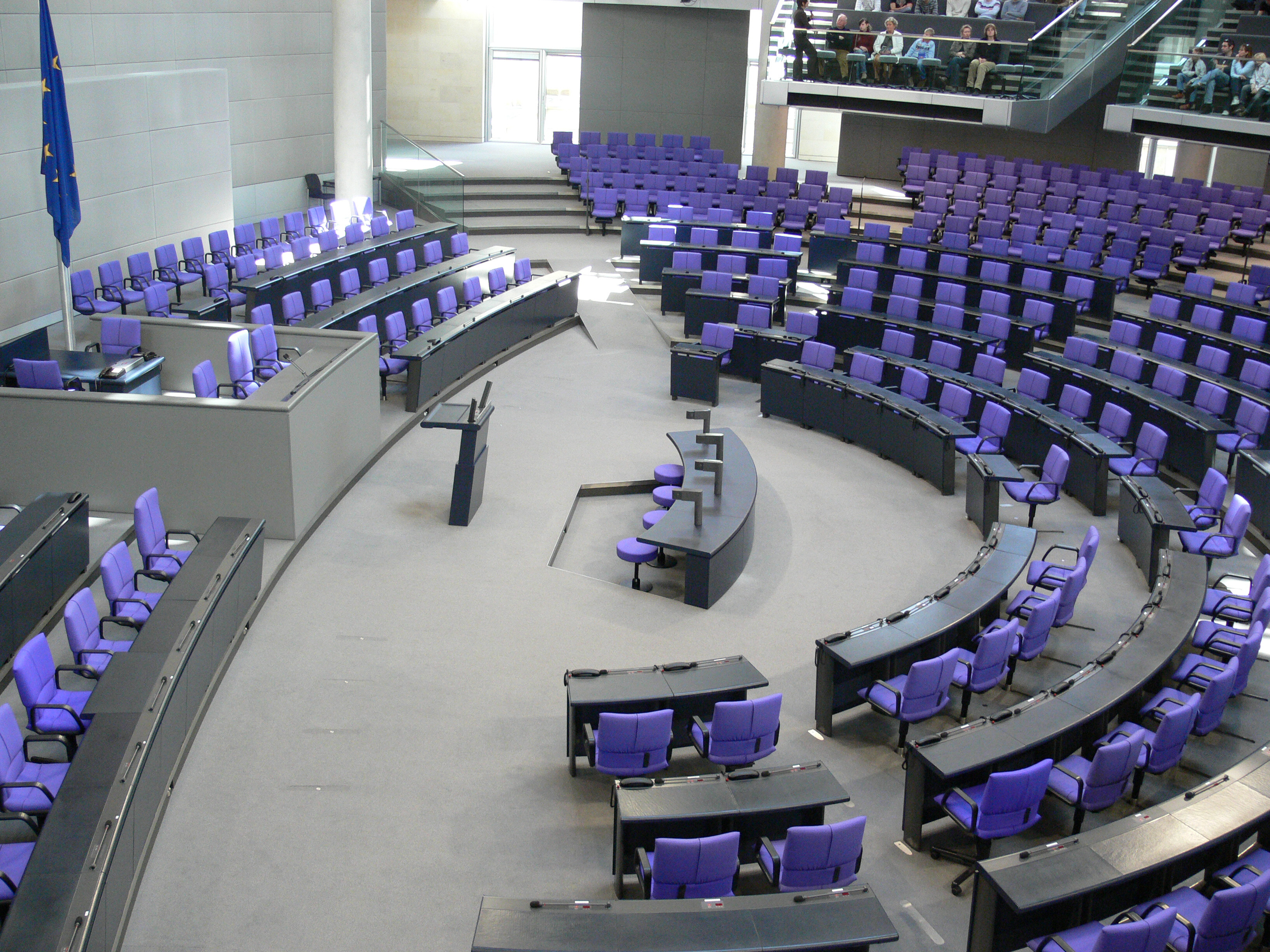
- Members: 736

This is a list of members of the 18th Bundestag – the lower house of parliament of the Federal Republic of Germany, whose members were in office from 22 October 2013 until 24 October 2017.

== Members ==
Member of the Bundestag	Born	Party	State^{1}	Constituency^{1}	First votes in %^{1}	Remarks
Jan van Aken	1961	DIE LINKE	Hamburg			
Stephan Albani	1968	CDU	Niedersachsen			
Katrin Albsteiger	1983	CSU	Bayern			
Agnes Alpers	1961	DIE LINKE	Bremen			Resigned on 2 March 2015
Peter Altmaier	1958	CDU	Saarland	Saarlouis	44,5	
Luise Amtsberg	1984	GRÜNE	Schleswig-Holstein			
Kerstin Andreae	1968	GRÜNE	Baden-Württemberg			
Niels Annen	1973	SPD	Hamburg	Hamburg-Eimsbüttel	37,5	
Ingrid Arndt-Brauer	1961	SPD	Nordrhein-Westfalen			
Rainer Arnold	1950	SPD	Baden-Württemberg			
Artur Auernhammer	1963	CSU	Bayern			
Heike Baehrens	1955	SPD	Baden-Württemberg			
Annalena Baerbock	1980	GRÜNE	Brandenburg			
Ulrike Bahr	1964	SPD	Bayern			
Bettina Bähr-Losse	1967	SPD	Nordrhein-Westfalen			In office since 1 October 2016 replacing Peer Steinbrück
Dorothee Bär	1978	CSU	Bayern	Bad Kissingen	57,9	
Heinz-Joachim Barchmann	1950	SPD	Niedersachsen			
Thomas Bareiß	1975	CDU	Baden-Württemberg	Zollernalb – Sigmaringen	60,7	
Katarina Barley	1968	SPD	Rheinland-Pfalz			
Doris Barnett	1953	SPD	Rheinland-Pfalz			
Hans-Peter Bartels	1961	SPD	Schleswig-Holstein	Kiel	43,0	Resigned on 20 May 2015
Klaus Barthel	1955	SPD	Bayern			
Norbert Barthle	1952	CDU	Baden-Württemberg	Backnang – Schwäbisch Gmünd	55,4	
Matthias Bartke	1959	SPD	Hamburg	Hamburg-Altona	34,9	
Sören Bartol	1974	SPD	Hessen	Marburg	43,7	
Dietmar Bartsch	1958	DIE LINKE	Mecklenburg-Vorpommern			
Bärbel Bas	1968	SPD	Nordrhein-Westfalen	Duisburg I	46,6	
Sabine Bätzing-Lichtenthäler	1975	SPD	Rheinland-Pfalz			Resigned on 11 November 2014
Günter Baumann	1947	CDU	Sachsen	Erzgebirgskreis I	50,2	
Marieluise Beck (Bremen)	1952	GRÜNE	Bremen			
Volker Beck (Köln)	1960	GRÜNE	Nordrhein-Westfalen			
Dirk Becker	1966	SPD	Nordrhein-Westfalen	Lippe I	41,1	Resigned on 20 October 2015
Uwe Beckmeyer	1949	SPD	Bremen	Bremen II – Bremerhaven	44,0	
Maik Beermann	1981	CDU	Niedersachsen			
Herbert Behrens	1954	DIE LINKE	Niedersachsen			
Manfred Behrens (Börde)	1956	CDU	Sachsen-Anhalt	Börde – Jerichower Land	44,6	
Veronika Bellmann	1960	CDU	Sachsen	Mittelsachsen	51,9	
Sybille Benning	1961	CDU	Nordrhein-Westfalen	Münster	38,8	
André Berghegger	1972	CDU	Niedersachsen	Osnabrück-Land	53,1	
Christoph Bergner	1948	CDU	Sachsen-Anhalt	Halle	36,3	
Ute Bertram	1961	CDU	Niedersachsen	Hildesheim	42,3	
Peter Beyer	1970	CDU	Nordrhein-Westfalen	Mettmann II	45,6	
Steffen Bilger	1979	CDU	Baden-Württemberg	Ludwigsburg	50,4	
Karin Binder	1957	DIE LINKE	Baden-Württemberg			
Lothar Binding (Heidelberg)	1950	SPD	Baden-Württemberg			
Clemens Binninger	1962	CDU	Baden-Württemberg	Böblingen	54,3	
Matthias Birkwald	1961	DIE LINKE	Nordrhein-Westfalen			
Peter Bleser	1952	CDU	Rheinland-Pfalz	Mosel/Rhein-Hunsrück	53,6	
Burkhard Blienert	1966	SPD	Nordrhein-Westfalen			
Heidrun Bluhm	1958	DIE LINKE	Mecklenburg-Vorpommern			
Maria Böhmer	1950	CDU	Rheinland-Pfalz	Ludwigshafen/Frankenthal	43,3	
Wolfgang Bosbach	1952	CDU	Nordrhein-Westfalen	Rheinisch-Bergischer Kreis	58,5	
Norbert Brackmann	1954	CDU	Schleswig-Holstein	Herzogtum Lauenburg – Stormarn-Süd	45,2	
Klaus Brähmig	1957	CDU	Sachsen	Sächsische Schweiz – Osterzgebirge	50,2	
Michael Brand	1973	CDU	Hessen	Fulda	58,2	
Reinhard Brandl	1977	CSU	Bayern	Ingolstadt	61,5	
Helmut Brandt	1950	CDU	Nordrhein-Westfalen	Aachen II	45,6	
Franziska Brantner	1979	GRÜNE	Baden-Württemberg			
Willi Brase	1951	SPD	Nordrhein-Westfalen			
Ralf Brauksiepe	1967	CDU	Nordrhein-Westfalen			
Helge Braun	1972	CDU	Hessen	Gießen	44,4	
Heike Brehmer	1962	CDU	Sachsen-Anhalt	Harz	46,0	
Ralph Brinkhaus	1968	CDU	Nordrhein-Westfalen	Gütersloh I	50,2	
Agnieszka Brugger	1985	GRÜNE	Baden-Württemberg			
Karl-Heinz Brunner	1953	SPD	Bayern			
Christine Buchholz	1971	DIE LINKE	Hessen			
Eva Bulling-Schröter	1956	DIE LINKE	Bayern			
Edelgard Bulmahn	1951	SPD	Niedersachsen	Stadt Hannover II	42,8	
Marco Bülow	1971	SPD	Nordrhein-Westfalen	Dortmund I	45,4	
Martin Burkert	1964	SPD	Bayern			
Cajus Julius Caesar	1951	CDU	Nordrhein-Westfalen			
Lars Castellucci	1974	SPD	Baden-Württemberg			
Roland Claus	1954	DIE LINKE	Sachsen-Anhalt			
Gitta Connemann	1964	CDU	Niedersachsen	Unterems	54,7	
Jürgen Coße	1969	SPD	Nordrhein-Westfalen			In office since 1 September 2016 replacing Petra Hinz
Petra Crone	1950	SPD	Nordrhein-Westfalen			
Sevim Dağdelen	1975	DIE LINKE	Nordrhein-Westfalen			
Bernhard Daldrup	1956	SPD	Nordrhein-Westfalen			
Diether Dehm	1950	DIE LINKE	Niedersachsen			
Ekin Deligöz	1971	GRÜNE	Bayern			
Karamba Diaby	1961	SPD	Sachsen-Anhalt			
Alexandra Dinges-Dierig	1953	CDU	Schleswig-Holstein			
Sabine Dittmar	1964	SPD	Bayern			
Alexander Dobrindt	1970	CSU	Bayern	Weilheim	57,2	
Michael Donth	1967	CDU	Baden-Württemberg	Reutlingen	51,9	
Thomas Dörflinger	1965	CDU	Baden-Württemberg	Waldshut	51,4	
Martin Dörmann	1962	SPD	Nordrhein-Westfalen	Cologne I	37,0	
Katja Dörner	1976	GRÜNE	Nordrhein-Westfalen			
Marie-Luise Dött	1953	CDU	Nordrhein-Westfalen			
Elvira Drobinski-Weiß	1951	SPD	Baden-Württemberg			
Katharina Dröge	1984	GRÜNE	Nordrhein-Westfalen			
Hansjörg Durz	1971	CSU	Bayern	Augsburg-Land	60,6	
Iris Eberl	1958	CSU	Bayern			In office since 10 April 2015 replacing Peter Gauweiler
Harald Ebner	1964	GRÜNE	Baden-Württemberg			
Jutta Eckenbach	1952	CDU	Nordrhein-Westfalen			
Sebastian Edathy	1969	SPD	Niedersachsen	Nienburg II – Schaumburg	44,6	Resigned on 10 February 2014
Siegmund Ehrmann	1952	SPD	Nordrhein-Westfalen	Krefeld II – Wesel II	41,5	
Michaela Engelmeier-Heite	1960	SPD	Nordrhein-Westfalen			
Gernot Erler	1944	SPD	Baden-Württemberg			
Klaus Ernst	1954	DIE LINKE	Bayern			
Petra Ernstberger	1955	SPD	Bayern			
Saskia Esken	1961	SPD	Baden-Württemberg			
Karin Evers-Meyer	1949	SPD	Niedersachsen	Friesland – Wilhelmshaven	44,1	
Bernd Fabritius	1965	CSU	Bayern			
Hermann Färber	1963	CDU	Baden-Württemberg	Göppingen	49,0	
Johannes Fechner	1972	SPD	Baden-Württemberg			
Uwe Feiler	1965	CDU	Brandenburg	Oberhavel – Havelland II	37,5	
Thomas Feist	1965	CDU	Sachsen	Leipzig II	34,3	
Fritz Felgentreu	1968	SPD	Berlin	Berlin-Neukölln	32,3	
Enak Ferlemann	1963	CDU	Niedersachsen	Cuxhaven – Stade II	46,8	
Elke Ferner	1958	SPD	Saarland			
Ute Finckh-Krämer	1956	SPD	Berlin			
Ingrid Fischbach	1957	CDU	Nordrhein-Westfalen			
Axel Fischer (Karlsruhe-Land)	1966	CDU	Baden-Württemberg	Karlsruhe-Land	53,3	
Dirk Fischer (Hamburg)	1943	CDU	Hamburg	Hamburg-Nord	39,7	
Maria Flachsbarth	1963	CDU	Niedersachsen			
Christian Flisek	1974	SPD	Bayern			
Klaus-Peter Flosbach	1952	CDU	Nordrhein-Westfalen	Oberbergischer Kreis	52,2	
Gabriele Fograscher	1957	SPD	Bayern			
Edgar Franke	1960	SPD	Hessen	Schwalm-Eder	42,3	
Ulrich Freese	1951	SPD	Brandenburg			
Thorsten Frei	1973	CDU	Baden-Württemberg	Schwarzwald-Baar	56,7	
Dagmar Freitag	1953	SPD	Nordrhein-Westfalen	Märkischer Kreis II	41,7	
Astrid Freudenstein	1973	CSU	Bayern			
Hans-Peter Friedrich	1957	CSU	Bayern	Hof	55,1	
Michael Frieser	1964	CSU	Bayern	Nuremberg South	44,3	
Michael Fuchs	1949	CDU	Rheinland-Pfalz	Koblenz	48,0	
Hans-Joachim Fuchtel	1952	CDU	Baden-Württemberg	Calw	58,5	
Alexander Funk	1974	CDU	Saarland	Homburg	39,8	Resigned on 13 July 2017
Sigmar Gabriel	1959	SPD	Niedersachsen	Salzgitter – Wolfenbüttel	46,6	
Ingo Gädechens	1960	CDU	Schleswig-Holstein	Ostholstein – Stormarn-Nord	45,8	
Thomas Gambke	1949	GRÜNE	Bayern			
Matthias Gastel	1970	GRÜNE	Baden-Württemberg			
Peter Gauweiler	1949	CSU	Bayern	Munich South	43,4	Resigned acc. to § 46 Abs. 1 Nr. 4 Federal Election Law on 31 March 2015
Thomas Gebhart	1971	CDU	Rheinland-Pfalz	Südpfalz	48,8	
Wolfgang Gehrcke	1943	DIE LINKE	Hessen			
Kai Gehring	1977	GRÜNE	Nordrhein-Westfalen			
Michael Gerdes	1960	SPD	Nordrhein-Westfalen	Bottrop – Recklinghausen III	45,8	
Alois Gerig	1956	CDU	Baden-Württemberg	Odenwald – Tauber	59,1	
Martin Gerster	1971	SPD	Baden-Württemberg			
Eberhard Gienger	1951	CDU	Baden-Württemberg	Neckar-Zaber	53,2	
Cemile Giousouf	1978	CDU	Nordrhein-Westfalen			
Iris Gleicke	1964	SPD	Thüringen			
Angelika Glöckner	1962	SPD	Rheinland-Pfalz			In office since 12 November 2014 replacing Sabine Bätzing-Lichtenthäler
Nicole Gohlke	1975	DIE LINKE	Bayern			
Diana Golze	1975	DIE LINKE	Brandenburg			Resigned on 6 November 2014
Josef Göppel	1950	CSU	Bayern	Ansbach	53,3	
Katrin Göring-Eckardt	1966	GRÜNE	Thüringen			
Ulrike Gottschalck	1955	SPD	Hessen	Kassel	40,0	
Kerstin Griese	1966	SPD	Nordrhein-Westfalen			
Reinhard Grindel	1961	CDU	Niedersachsen	Rotenburg I - Heidekreis	44,8	Resigned on 3 June 2016
Ursula Groden-Kranich	1965	CDU	Rheinland-Pfalz	Mainz	40,2	
Hermann Gröhe	1961	CDU	Nordrhein-Westfalen	Neuss I	51,6	
Klaus-Dieter Gröhler	1966	CDU	Berlin	Berlin-Charlottenburg – Wilmersdorf	37,1	
Gabriele Groneberg	1955	SPD	Niedersachsen			In office since 11 February 2014 replacing Sebastian Edathy
Michael Groß	1956	SPD	Nordrhein-Westfalen	Recklinghausen II	45,7	
Michael Grosse-Brömer	1960	CDU	Niedersachsen	Harburg	45,2	
Astrid Grotelüschen	1964	CDU	Niedersachsen	Delmenhorst – Wesermarsch – Oldenburg-Land	39,8	
Annette Groth	1954	DIE LINKE	Baden-Württemberg			
Uli Grötsch	1975	SPD	Bayern			
Markus Grübel	1959	CDU	Baden-Württemberg	Esslingen	51,3	
Manfred Grund	1955	CDU	Thüringen	Eichsfeld – Nordhausen – Unstrut-Hainich-Kreis I	49,8	
Oliver Grundmann	1971	CDU	Niedersachsen	Stade I – Rotenburg II	47,6	
Monika Grütters	1962	CDU	Berlin			
Herlind Gundelach	1949	CDU	Hamburg			
Wolfgang Gunkel	1947	SPD	Sachsen			
Fritz Güntzler	1966	CDU	Niedersachsen			
Olav Gutting	1970	CDU	Baden-Württemberg	Bruchsal – Schwetzingen	51,8	
Gregor Gysi	1948	DIE LINKE	Berlin	Berlin-Treptow – Köpenick	42,2	
Christian Haase	1966	CDU	Nordrhein-Westfalen	Höxter–Lippe II	50,0	
Bettina Hagedorn	1955	SPD	Schleswig-Holstein			
Rita Hagl-Kehl	1970	SPD	Bayern			
André Hahn	1963	DIE LINKE	Sachsen			
Florian Hahn	1974	CSU	Bayern	Munich Land	52,5	
Anja Hajduk	1963	GRÜNE	Hamburg			
Rainer Hajek	1945	CDU	Niedersachsen			In office since 1 November 2016 replacing Heiko Schmelzle
Metin Hakverdi	1969	SPD	Hamburg	Hamburg-Bergedorf – Harburg	40,4	
Ulrich Hampel	1964	SPD	Nordrhein-Westfalen			
Heike Hänsel	1966	DIE LINKE	Baden-Württemberg			
Stephan Harbarth	1971	CDU	Baden-Württemberg	Rhein-Neckar	49,7	
Jürgen Hardt	1963	CDU	Nordrhein-Westfalen	Solingen – Remscheid – Wuppertal II	44,3	
Michael Hartmann (Wackernheim)	1963	SPD	Rheinland-Pfalz			
Sebastian Hartmann	1977	SPD	Nordrhein-Westfalen			
Gerda Hasselfeldt	1950	CSU	Bayern	Fürstenfeldbruck	55,6	
Britta Haßelmann	1961	GRÜNE	Nordrhein-Westfalen			
Matthias Hauer	1977	CDU	Nordrhein-Westfalen	Essen III	39,5	
Mark Hauptmann	1984	CDU	Thüringen	Suhl – Schmalkalden-Meiningen – Hildburghausen	42,0	
Stefan Heck	1982	CDU	Hessen			
Dirk Heidenblut	1961	SPD	Nordrhein-Westfalen	Essen II	48,3	
Matthias Heider	1966	CDU	Nordrhein-Westfalen	Olpe – Märkischer Kreis I	51,7	
Helmut Heiderich	1949	CDU	Hessen			
Hubertus Heil (Peine)	1972	SPD	Niedersachsen	Gifhorn – Peine	43,3	
Mechthild Heil	1961	CDU	Rheinland-Pfalz	Ahrweiler	55,5	
Rosemarie Hein	1953	DIE LINKE	Sachsen-Anhalt			
Frank Heinrich (Chemnitz)	1964	CDU	Sachsen	Chemnitz	41,7	
Gabriela Heinrich	1963	SPD	Bayern			
Marcus Held	1977	SPD	Rheinland-Pfalz			
Mark Helfrich	1978	CDU	Schleswig-Holstein	Steinburg – Dithmarschen Süd	45,4	
Uda Heller	1951	CDU	Sachsen-Anhalt	Mansfeld	41,9	
Wolfgang Hellmich	1958	SPD	Nordrhein-Westfalen			
Jörg Hellmuth	1957	CDU	Sachsen-Anhalt	Altmark	42,1	
Barbara Hendricks	1952	SPD	Nordrhein-Westfalen			
Rudolf Henke	1954	CDU	Nordrhein-Westfalen	Aachen I	40,8	
Heidtrud Henn	1962	SPD	Saarland			
Michael Hennrich	1965	CDU	Baden-Württemberg	Nürtingen	51,0	
Marion Herdan	1958	CDU	Schleswig-Holstein			In office since 28 June 2017 replacing Ingbert Liebing
Gustav Herzog	1958	SPD	Rheinland-Pfalz	Kaiserslautern	38,5	
Ansgar Heveling	1972	CDU	Nordrhein-Westfalen	Krefeld I – Neuss II	49,1	
Gabriele Hiller-Ohm	1953	SPD	Schleswig-Holstein	Lübeck	40,7	
Peter Hintze	1950	CDU	Nordrhein-Westfalen			Died on 26 November 2016
Peter Hinz	1958	CDU	Baden-Württemberg			didn't accept his mandate
Petra Hinz (Essen)	1962	SPD	Nordrhein-Westfalen			Resigned on 31 August 2016
Priska Hinz (Herborn)	1959	GRÜNE	Hessen			Resigned on 24 January 2014
Christian Hirte	1976	CDU	Thüringen	Eisenach – Wartburgkreis – Unstrut-Hainich-Kreis II	43,3	
Heribert Hirte	1958	CDU	Nordrhein-Westfalen	Cologne II	40,0	
Thomas Hitschler	1982	SPD	Rheinland-Pfalz			
Robert Hochbaum	1954	CDU	Sachsen	Vogtlandkreis	48,3	
Alexander Hoffmann	1975	CSU	Bayern	Main-Spessart	51,7	
Thorsten Hoffmann (Dortmund)	1961	CDU	Nordrhein-Westfalen			In office since 1 January 2015 replacing Ronald Pofalla
Anton Hofreiter	1970	GRÜNE	Bayern			
Inge Höger	1950	DIE LINKE	Nordrhein-Westfalen			
Eva Högl	1969	SPD	Berlin	Berlin-Mitte	28,2	
Bärbel Höhn	1952	GRÜNE	Nordrhein-Westfalen			
Karl Holmeier	1956	CSU	Bayern	Schwandorf	57,7	
Franz-Josef Holzenkamp	1960	CDU	Niedersachsen	Cloppenburg – Vechta	66,3	
Hendrik Hoppenstedt	1972	CDU	Niedersachsen	Hannover-Land I	44,3	
Margaret Horb	1967	CDU	Baden-Württemberg			
Mathias Edwin Höschel	1967	CDU	Nordrhein-Westfalen			In office since 7 December 2016 replacing Peter Hintze
Bettina Hornhues	1972	CDU	Bremen			
Charles M. Huber	1956	CDU	Hessen			
Anette Hübinger	1955	CDU	Saarland	Saarbrücken	36,9	
Andrej Hunko	1963	DIE LINKE	Nordrhein-Westfalen			
Sigrid Hupach	1968	DIE LINKE	Thüringen			
Hubert Hüppe	1956	CDU	Nordrhein-Westfalen			
Matthias Ilgen	1983	SPD	Schleswig-Holstein			
Erich Irlstorfer	1970	CSU	Bayern	Freising	52,9	
Dieter Janecek	1976	GRÜNE	Bayern			
Christina Jantz	1978	SPD	Niedersachsen			
Thomas Jarzombek	1973	CDU	Nordrhein-Westfalen	Düsseldorf I	47,9	
Ulla Jelpke	1951	DIE LINKE	Nordrhein-Westfalen			
Thomas Jepsen	1973	CDU	Schleswig-Holstein			In office since 3 July 2017 replacing Sabine Sütterlin-Waack
Sylvia Jörrißen	1967	CDU	Nordrhein-Westfalen			
Reinhold Jost	1966	SPD	Saarland			Resigned on 1 January 2014
Andreas Jung (Konstanz)	1975	CDU	Baden-Württemberg	Konstanz	51,9	
Franz Josef Jung	1949	CDU	Hessen	Groß-Gerau	42,2	
Xaver Jung	1962	CDU	Rheinland-Pfalz			
Frank Junge	1967	SPD	Mecklenburg-Vorpommern			
Josip Juratovic	1959	SPD	Baden-Württemberg			
Thomas Jurk	1962	SPD	Sachsen			
Egon Jüttner	1942	CDU	Baden-Württemberg	Mannheim	39,8	
Oliver Kaczmarek	1970	SPD	Nordrhein-Westfalen	Unna I	46,7	
Johannes Kahrs	1963	SPD	Hamburg	Hamburg-Mitte	39,2	
Bartholomäus Kalb	1949	CSU	Bayern	Deggendorf	61,4	
Hans-Werner Kammer	1948	CDU	Niedersachsen			
Steffen Kampeter	1963	CDU	Nordrhein-Westfalen	Minden-Lübbecke I	46,3	Resigned on 5 July 2016
Christina Kampmann	1980	SPD	Nordrhein-Westfalen	Bielefeld – Gütersloh II	38,1	Resigned on 30 September 2015
Steffen Kanitz	1984	CDU	Nordrhein-Westfalen			
Ralf Kapschack	1954	SPD	Nordrhein-Westfalen	Ennepe-Ruhr-Kreis II	42,3	
Susanna Karawanskij	1980	DIE LINKE	Sachsen			
Alois Karl	1950	CSU	Bayern	Amberg	58,4	
Anja Karliczek	1971	CDU	Nordrhein-Westfalen	Steinfurt III	47,9	
Kerstin Kassner	1958	DIE LINKE	Mecklenburg-Vorpommern			
Bernhard Kaster	1957	CDU	Rheinland-Pfalz	Trier	48,8	
Gabriele Katzmarek	1960	SPD	Baden-Württemberg			
Volker Kauder	1949	CDU	Baden-Württemberg	Rottweil – Tuttlingen	57,8	
Stefan Kaufmann	1969	CDU	Baden-Württemberg	Stuttgart I	42,0	
Uwe Kekeritz	1953	GRÜNE	Bayern			
Ulrich Kelber	1968	SPD	Nordrhein-Westfalen	Bonn	38,2	
Ronja Kemmer	1989	CDU	Baden-Württemberg			In office since 27 December 2014 replacing Andreas Schockenhoff
Marina Kermer	1960	SPD	Sachsen-Anhalt			
Katja Keul	1969	GRÜNE	Niedersachsen			
Roderich Kiesewetter	1963	CDU	Baden-Württemberg	Aalen – Heidenheim	57,6	
Sven-Christian Kindler	1985	GRÜNE	Niedersachsen			
Georg Kippels	1959	CDU	Nordrhein-Westfalen	Rhein-Erft-Kreis I	47,3	
Katja Kipping	1978	DIE LINKE	Sachsen			
Cansel Kiziltepe	1975	SPD	Berlin			
Arno Klare	1952	SPD	Nordrhein-Westfalen	Mülheim – Essen I	42,2	
Volkmar Klein	1960	CDU	Nordrhein-Westfalen	Siegen-Wittgenstein	45,8	
Maria Klein-Schmeink	1958	GRÜNE	Nordrhein-Westfalen			
Jürgen Klimke	1948	CDU	Hamburg			
Lars Klingbeil	1978	SPD	Niedersachsen			
Axel Knoerig	1967	CDU	Niedersachsen	Diepholz – Nienburg I	47,5	
Tom Koenigs	1944	GRÜNE	Hessen			
Jens Koeppen	1962	CDU	Brandenburg	Uckermark – Barnim I	38,9	
Bärbel Kofler	1967	SPD	Bayern			
Daniela Kolbe	1980	SPD	Sachsen			
Birgit Kömpel	1967	SPD	Hessen			
Markus Koob	1977	CDU	Hessen	Hochtaunus	48,8	
Carsten Körber	1979	CDU	Sachsen	Zwickau	44,6	
Jan Korte	1977	DIE LINKE	Sachsen-Anhalt			
Hartmut Koschyk	1959	CSU	Bayern	Bayreuth	55,9	
Sylvia Kotting-Uhl	1952	GRÜNE	Baden-Württemberg			
Kordula Kovac	1957	CDU	Baden-Württemberg			
Anette Kramme	1967	SPD	Bayern			
Jutta Krellmann	1956	DIE LINKE	Niedersachsen			
Michael Kretschmer	1975	CDU	Sachsen	Görlitz	49,6	
Gunther Krichbaum	1964	CDU	Baden-Württemberg	Pforzheim	49,5	
Günter Krings	1969	CDU	Nordrhein-Westfalen	Mönchengladbach	50,8	
Oliver Krischer	1969	GRÜNE	Nordrhein-Westfalen			
Hans-Ulrich Krüger	1952	SPD	Nordrhein-Westfalen			
Angelika Krüger-Leißner	1951	SPD	Brandenburg			In office since 25 February 2017 replacing Frank-Walter Steinmeier
Rüdiger Kruse	1961	CDU	Hamburg			
Bettina Kudla	1962	CDU	Sachsen	Leipzig I	40,0	
Christian Kühn (Tübingen)	1979	GRÜNE	Baden-Württemberg			
Stephan Kühn (Dresden)	1979	GRÜNE	Sachsen			
Helga Kühn-Mengel	1947	SPD	Nordrhein-Westfalen			
Roy Kühne	1967	CDU	Niedersachsen			
Renate Künast	1955	GRÜNE	Berlin			
Katrin Kunert	1964	DIE LINKE	Sachsen-Anhalt			
Markus Kurth	1966	GRÜNE	Nordrhein-Westfalen			
Günter Lach	1954	CDU	Niedersachsen	Helmstedt – Wolfsburg	44,7	
Uwe Lagosky	1962	CDU	Niedersachsen			
Christine Lambrecht	1965	SPD	Hessen			
Karl A. Lamers	1951	CDU	Baden-Württemberg	Heidelberg	40,9	
Andreas Lämmel	1959	CDU	Sachsen	Dresden I	42,6	
Norbert Lammert	1948	CDU	Nordrhein-Westfalen			
Katharina Landgraf	1954	CDU	Sachsen	Leipzig-Land	51,3	
Christian Lange (Backnang)	1964	SPD	Baden-Württemberg			
Ulrich Lange	1969	CSU	Bayern	Donau-Ries	60,6	
Barbara Lanzinger	1954	CSU	Bayern			
Silke Launert	1976	CSU	Bayern			
Karl Lauterbach	1963	SPD	Nordrhein-Westfalen	Leverkusen – Cologne IV	41,3	
Caren Lay	1972	DIE LINKE	Sachsen			
Monika Lazar	1967	GRÜNE	Sachsen			
Paul Lehrieder	1959	CSU	Bayern	Würzburg	48,9	
Sabine Leidig	1961	DIE LINKE	Hessen			
Katja Leikert	1975	CDU	Hessen	Hanau	44,3	
Steffi Lemke	1968	GRÜNE	Sachsen-Anhalt			
Steffen-Claudio Lemme	1965	SPD	Thüringen			
Philipp Lengsfeld	1972	CDU	Berlin			
Ralph Lenkert	1967	DIE LINKE	Thüringen			
Andreas Lenz	1981	CSU	Bayern	Erding – Ebersberg	55,4	
Philipp Graf von und zu Lerchenfeld	1952	CSU	Bayern	Regensburg	48,5	
Michael Leutert	1974	DIE LINKE	Sachsen			
Ursula von der Leyen	1958	CDU	Niedersachsen			
Antje Lezius	1960	CDU	Rheinland-Pfalz	Kreuznach	41,4	
Stefan Liebich	1972	DIE LINKE	Berlin	Berlin-Pankow	28,3	
Ingbert Liebing	1963	CDU	Schleswig-Holstein	Nordfriesland – Dithmarschen Nord	49,8	Resigned on 27 June 2017
Matthias Lietz	1953	CDU	Mecklenburg-Vorpommern	Mecklenburgische Seenplatte I – Vorpommern-Greifswald II	45,9	
Andrea Lindholz	1970	CSU	Bayern	Aschaffenburg	52,4	
Tobias Lindner	1982	GRÜNE	Rheinland-Pfalz			
Carsten Linnemann	1977	CDU	Nordrhein-Westfalen	Paderborn	59,1	
Patricia Lips	1963	CDU	Hessen	Odenwald	46,9	
Burkhard Lischka	1965	SPD	Sachsen-Anhalt			
Wilfried Lorenz	1942	CDU	Niedersachsen			
Gabriele Lösekrug-Möller	1951	SPD	Niedersachsen	Hameln-Pyrmont – Holzminden	42,3	
Hiltrud Lotze	1958	SPD	Niedersachsen			
Gesine Lötzsch	1961	DIE LINKE	Berlin	Berlin-Lichtenberg	40,3	
Claudia Lücking-Michel	1962	CDU	Nordrhein-Westfalen			
Jan-Marco Luczak	1975	CDU	Berlin	Berlin-Tempelhof – Schöneberg	35,1	
Daniela Ludwig	1975	CSU	Bayern	Rosenheim	58,1	
Kirsten Lühmann	1964	SPD	Niedersachsen			
Thomas Lutze	1969	DIE LINKE	Saarland			
Karin Maag	1962	CDU	Baden-Württemberg	Stuttgart II	43,8	
Yvonne Magwas	1979	CDU	Sachsen			
Thomas Mahlberg	1965	CDU	Nordrhein-Westfalen			
Nicole Maisch	1981	GRÜNE	Hessen			
Thomas de Maizière	1954	CDU	Sachsen	Meissen	53,6	
Birgit Malecha-Nissen	1958	SPD	Schleswig-Holstein			
Gisela Manderla	1958	CDU	Nordrhein-Westfalen			
Caren Marks	1963	SPD	Niedersachsen			
Matern von Marschall	1962	CDU	Baden-Württemberg	Freiburg	34,9	
Hans-Georg von der Marwitz	1961	CDU	Brandenburg	Märkisch-Oderland – Barnim II	34,0	
Katja Mast	1971	SPD	Baden-Württemberg			
Andreas Mattfeldt	1969	CDU	Niedersachsen	Osterholz – Verden	44,0	
Hilde Mattheis	1954	SPD	Baden-Württemberg			
Stephan Mayer (Altötting)	1973	CSU	Bayern	Altötting	65,8	
Reiner Meier	1953	CSU	Bayern			
Michael Meister	1961	CDU	Hessen	Bergstraße	48,3	
Peter Meiwald	1966	GRÜNE	Niedersachsen			
Birgit Menz	1962	DIE LINKE	Bremen			In office since 16 March 2015 replacing Agnes Alpers
Angela Merkel	1954	CDU	Mecklenburg-Vorpommern	Vorpommern-Rügen – Vorpommern-Greifswald I	56,2	
Jan Metzler	1981	CDU	Rheinland-Pfalz	Worms	42,0	
Maria Michalk	1949	CDU	Sachsen	Bautzen I	49,2	
Hans Michelbach	1949	CSU	Bayern	Coburg	50,1	
Mathias Middelberg	1964	CDU	Niedersachsen	Stadt Osnabrück	45,7	
Matthias Miersch	1968	SPD	Niedersachsen	Hannover-Land II	43,4	
Irene Mihalic	1976	GRÜNE	Nordrhein-Westfalen			
Klaus Mindrup	1964	SPD	Berlin			
Philipp Mißfelder	1979	CDU	Nordrhein-Westfalen			Died on 13 July 2015
Susanne Mittag	1958	SPD	Niedersachsen			
Cornelia Möhring	1960	DIE LINKE	Schleswig-Holstein			
Dietrich Monstadt	1957	CDU	Mecklenburg-Vorpommern	Schwerin – Ludwigslust-Parchim I – Nordwestmecklenburg I	39,0	
Karsten Möring	1949	CDU	Nordrhein-Westfalen			
Marlene Mortler	1955	CSU	Bayern	Roth	50,6	
Volker Mosblech	1955	CDU	Nordrhein-Westfalen			In office since 20 July 2015 replacing Philipp Mißfelder
Elisabeth Motschmann	1952	CDU	Bremen			
Niema Movassat	1984	DIE LINKE	Nordrhein-Westfalen			
Bettina Müller	1959	SPD	Hessen			
Carsten Müller (Braunschweig)	1970	CDU	Niedersachsen			
Detlef Müller (Chemnitz)	1964	SPD	Sachsen			In office since 19 December 2014 replacing Wolfgang Tiefensee
Gerd Müller	1955	CSU	Bayern	Oberallgäu	60,7	
Norbert Müller (Potsdam)	1986	DIE LINKE	Brandenburg			In office since 7 November 2014 replacing Diana Golze
Stefan Müller (Erlangen)	1975	CSU	Bayern	Erlangen	48,5	
Beate Müller-Gemmeke	1960	GRÜNE	Baden-Württemberg			
Michelle Müntefering	1980	SPD	Nordrhein-Westfalen	Herne – Bochum II	48,6	
Philipp Murmann	1964	CDU	Schleswig-Holstein	Plön – Neumünster	43,7	
Özcan Mutlu	1968	GRÜNE	Berlin			
Rolf Mützenich	1959	SPD	Nordrhein-Westfalen	Cologne III	39,3	
Andrea Nahles	1970	SPD	Rheinland-Pfalz			
Alexander Neu	1969	DIE LINKE	Nordrhein-Westfalen			
Andreas Nick	1967	CDU	Rheinland-Pfalz	Montabaur	49,4	
Dietmar Nietan	1964	SPD	Nordrhein-Westfalen			
Ulli Nissen	1959	SPD	Hessen			
Michaela Noll	1959	CDU	Nordrhein-Westfalen	Mettmann I	49,5	
Thomas Nord	1957	DIE LINKE	Brandenburg			
Konstantin von Notz	1971	GRÜNE	Schleswig-Holstein			
Omid Nouripour	1975	GRÜNE	Hessen			
Helmut Nowak	1941	CDU	Nordrhein-Westfalen			
Georg Nüßlein	1969	CSU	Bayern	Neu-Ulm	57,5	
Julia Obermeier	1984	CSU	Bayern			
Wilfried Oellers	1975	CDU	Nordrhein-Westfalen	Heinsberg	53,4	
Thomas Oppermann	1954	SPD	Niedersachsen	Göttingen	40,4	
Florian Oßner	1980	CSU	Bayern	Landshut	58,1	
Friedrich Ostendorff	1953	GRÜNE	Nordrhein-Westfalen			
Tim Ostermann	1979	CDU	Nordrhein-Westfalen			
Henning Otte	1968	CDU	Niedersachsen	Celle – Uelzen	48,5	
Cem Özdemir	1965	GRÜNE	Baden-Württemberg			
Mahmut Özdemir (Duisburg)	1987	SPD	Nordrhein-Westfalen	Duisburg II	43,2	
Aydan Özoğuz	1967	SPD	Hamburg	Hamburg-Wandsbek	39,9	
Ingrid Pahlmann	1957	CDU	Niedersachsen			
Sylvia Pantel	1961	CDU	Nordrhein-Westfalen	Düsseldorf II	40,7	
Markus Paschke	1963	SPD	Niedersachsen			
Martin Patzelt	1947	CDU	Brandenburg	Frankfurt (Oder) – Oder-Spree	33,9	
Martin Pätzold	1984	CDU	Berlin			
Petra Pau	1963	DIE LINKE	Berlin	Berlin-Marzahn – Hellersdorf	38,9	
Elisabeth Paus	1968	GRÜNE	Berlin			
Christian Petry	1965	SPD	Saarland			In office since 2 January 2014 replacing Reinhold Jost
Harald Petzold (Havelland)	1962	DIE LINKE	Brandenburg			
Ulrich Petzold	1951	CDU	Sachsen-Anhalt	Dessau – Wittenberg	44,6	
Joachim Pfeiffer	1967	CDU	Baden-Württemberg	Waiblingen	51,5	
Sibylle Pfeiffer	1951	CDU	Hessen	Lahn-Dill	48,1	
Jeannine Pflugradt	1973	SPD	Mecklenburg-Vorpommern			
Detlev Pilger	1955	SPD	Rheinland-Pfalz			
Richard Pitterle	1959	DIE LINKE	Baden-Württemberg			
Ronald Pofalla	1959	CDU	Nordrhein-Westfalen	Kleve	50,9	Resigned on 31 December 2014
Eckhard Pols	1962	CDU	Niedersachsen	Lüchow-Dannenberg – Lüneburg	39,8	
Sabine Poschmann	1968	SPD	Nordrhein-Westfalen	Dortmund II	46,7	
Joachim Poß	1948	SPD	Nordrhein-Westfalen	Gelsenkirchen	50,5	
Achim Post (Minden)	1959	SPD	Nordrhein-Westfalen			
Florian Post	1981	SPD	Bayern			
Brigitte Pothmer	1955	GRÜNE	Niedersachsen			
Wilhelm Priesmeier	1954	SPD	Niedersachsen	Goslar – Northeim – Osterode	42,2	
Florian Pronold	1972	SPD	Bayern			
Sascha Raabe	1968	SPD	Hessen			
Simone Raatz	1962	SPD	Sachsen			
Martin Rabanus	1971	SPD	Hessen			
Thomas Rachel	1962	CDU	Nordrhein-Westfalen	Düren	50,3	
Kerstin Radomski	1974	CDU	Nordrhein-Westfalen			
Alexander Radwan	1964	CSU	Bayern	Starnberg	54,1	
Alois Georg Josef Rainer	1965	CSU	Bayern	Straubing	61,2	
Peter Ramsauer	1954	CSU	Bayern	Traunstein	62,6	
Mechthild Rawert	1957	SPD	Berlin			
Stefan Rebmann	1962	SPD	Baden-Württemberg			
Eckhardt Rehberg	1954	CDU	Mecklenburg-Vorpommern	Mecklenburgische Seenplatte II – Landkreis Rostock III	47,0	
Katherina Reiche (Potsdam)	1973	CDU	Brandenburg	Potsdam – Potsdam-Mittelmark II – Teltow-Fläming II	32,6	Resigned on 4 September 2015
Gerold Reichenbach	1953	SPD	Hessen			
Carola Reimann	1967	SPD	Niedersachsen	Braunschweig	43,6	
Martina Renner	1967	DIE LINKE	Thüringen			
Daniela De Ridder	1962	SPD	Niedersachsen			
Lothar Riebsamen	1957	CDU	Baden-Württemberg	Bodensee	53,9	
Josef Rief	1960	CDU	Baden-Württemberg	Biberach	59,0	
Heinz Riesenhuber	1935	CDU	Hessen	Main-Taunus	52,5	
Andreas Rimkus	1962	SPD	Nordrhein-Westfalen			
Iris Ripsam	1959	CDU	Baden-Württemberg			In office since 8 June 2016 replacing Thomas Strobl
Sönke Rix	1975	SPD	Schleswig-Holstein			
Petra Rode-Bosse	1959	SPD	Nordrhein-Westfalen			In office since 21 October 2015 replacing Dirk Becker
Dennis Rohde	1986	SPD	Niedersachsen	Oldenburg – Ammerland	37,4	
Johannes Röring	1959	CDU	Nordrhein-Westfalen	Borken II	57,4	
Kathrin Rösel	1970	CDU	Niedersachsen			In office since 4 June 2016 replacing Reinhard Grindel
Martin Rosemann	1976	SPD	Baden-Württemberg			
René Röspel	1964	SPD	Nordrhein-Westfalen	Hagen – Ennepe-Ruhr-Kreis I	47,1	
Ernst Dieter Rossmann	1951	SPD	Schleswig-Holstein			
Tabea Rößner	1966	GRÜNE	Rheinland-Pfalz			
Claudia Roth (Augsburg)	1955	GRÜNE	Bayern			
Michael Roth (Heringen)	1970	SPD	Hessen	Werra-Meißner – Hersfeld-Rotenburg	43,1	
Norbert Röttgen	1965	CDU	Nordrhein-Westfalen	Rhein-Sieg-Kreis II	52,4	
Erwin Rüddel	1955	CDU	Rheinland-Pfalz	Neuwied	46,9	
Corinna Rüffer	1975	GRÜNE	Rheinland-Pfalz			
Albert Rupprecht	1968	CSU	Bayern	Weiden	55,1	
Susann Rüthrich	1977	SPD	Sachsen			
Bernd Rützel	1968	SPD	Bayern			
Sarah Ryglewski	1983	SPD	Bremen			In office since 17 July 2015 replacing Carsten Sieling
Johann Saathoff	1967	SPD	Niedersachsen	Aurich – Emden	50,3	
Manuel Sarrazin	1982	GRÜNE	Hamburg			
Annette Sawade	1953	SPD	Baden-Württemberg			
Hans-Joachim Schabedoth	1952	SPD	Hessen			
Anita Schäfer (Saalstadt)	1951	CDU	Rheinland-Pfalz	Pirmasens	39,4	
Axel Schäfer (Bochum)	1952	SPD	Nordrhein-Westfalen	Bochum I	45,9	
Elisabeth Scharfenberg	1963	GRÜNE	Bayern			
Wolfgang Schäuble	1942	CDU	Baden-Württemberg	Offenburg	56,0	
Ursula Schauws	1966	GRÜNE	Nordrhein-Westfalen			
Annette Schavan	1955	CDU	Baden-Württemberg	Ulm	52,1	Resigned on 30 June 2014
Nina Scheer	1971	SPD	Schleswig-Holstein			
Andreas Scheuer	1974	CSU	Bayern	Passau	59,8	
Gerhard Schick	1972	GRÜNE	Baden-Württemberg			
Marianne Schieder (Schwandorf)	1962	SPD	Bayern			
Udo Schiefner	1959	SPD	Nordrhein-Westfalen			
Karl Schiewerling	1951	CDU	Nordrhein-Westfalen	Coesfeld – Steinfurt II	56,1	
Jana Schimke	1979	CDU	Brandenburg	Dahme-Spreewald – Teltow-Fläming III – Oberspreewald-Lausitz I	37,0	
Norbert Schindler	1949	CDU	Rheinland-Pfalz	Neustadt – Speyer	47,9	
Tankred Schipanski	1976	CDU	Thüringen	Gotha – Ilm-Kreis	37,3	
Michael Schlecht	1951	DIE LINKE	Baden-Württemberg			
Dorothee Schlegel	1959	SPD	Baden-Württemberg			
Heiko Schmelzle	1970	CDU	Niedersachsen			Resigned on 31 October 2016
Christian Schmidt (Fürth)	1957	CSU	Bayern	Fürth	49,2	
Dagmar Schmidt (Wetzlar)	1973	SPD	Hessen			
Frithjof Schmidt	1953	GRÜNE	Nordrhein-Westfalen			
Gabriele Schmidt (Ühlingen)	1956	CDU	Baden-Württemberg			
Matthias Schmidt (Berlin)	1963	SPD	Berlin			
Ulla Schmidt (Aachen)	1949	SPD	Nordrhein-Westfalen			
Carsten Schneider (Erfurt)	1976	SPD	Thüringen			
Patrick Schnieder	1968	CDU	Rheinland-Pfalz	Bitburg	56,0	
Elfi Scho-Antwerpes	1952	SPD	Nordrhein-Westfalen			In office since 1 October 2015 replacing Christina Kampmann
Andreas Schockenhoff	1957	CDU	Baden-Württemberg	Ravensburg	51,6	died on 13 December 2014
Nadine Schön (St. Wendel)	1983	CDU	Saarland	St. Wendel	45,4	
Kristina Schröder (Wiesbaden)	1977	CDU	Hessen	Wiesbaden	43,6	
Ole Schröder	1971	CDU	Schleswig-Holstein	Pinneberg	45,4	
Ursula Schulte	1952	SPD	Nordrhein-Westfalen			
Bernhard Schulte-Drüggelte	1951	CDU	Nordrhein-Westfalen	Soest	49,8	
Swen Schulz (Spandau)	1968	SPD	Berlin			
Kordula Schulz-Asche	1956	GRÜNE	Hessen			
Klaus-Peter Schulze	1954	CDU	Brandenburg	Cottbus – Spree-Neiße	36,0	
Uwe Schummer	1957	CDU	Nordrhein-Westfalen	Viersen	53,0	
Ewald Schurer	1954	SPD	Bayern			
Armin Schuster (Weil am Rhein)	1961	CDU	Baden-Württemberg	Lörrach – Müllheim	50,1	
Frank Schwabe	1970	SPD	Nordrhein-Westfalen	Recklinghausen I	45,2	
Stefan Schwartze	1974	SPD	Nordrhein-Westfalen	Herford – Minden-Lübbecke II	41,3	
Andreas Schwarz	1965	SPD	Bayern			
Rita Schwarzelühr-Sutter	1962	SPD	Baden-Württemberg			
Christina Schwarzer	1976	CDU	Berlin			
Detlef Seif	1962	CDU	Nordrhein-Westfalen	Euskirchen – Erftkreis II	50,9	
Johannes Selle	1956	CDU	Thüringen	Kyffhäuserkreis – Sömmerda – Weimarer Land I	43,3	
Reinhold Sendker	1952	CDU	Nordrhein-Westfalen	Warendorf	51,3	
Patrick Sensburg	1971	CDU	Nordrhein-Westfalen	Hochsauerlandkreis	56,1	
Bernd Siebert	1949	CDU	Hessen			
Carsten Sieling	1959	SPD	Bremen	Bremen I	37,9	Resigned on 16 July 2015, elected Mayor of Bremen
Thomas Silberhorn	1968	CSU	Bayern	Bamberg	52,2	
Johannes Singhammer	1953	CSU	Bayern	München-Nord	43,2	
Petra Sitte	1960	DIE LINKE	Sachsen-Anhalt			
Tino Sorge	1975	CDU	Sachsen-Anhalt	Magdeburg	36,3	
Jens Spahn	1980	CDU	Nordrhein-Westfalen	Steinfurt I – Borken I	52,0	
Rainer Spiering	1956	SPD	Niedersachsen			
Norbert Spinrath	1957	SPD	Nordrhein-Westfalen			
Svenja Stadler	1976	SPD	Niedersachsen			
Martina Stamm-Fibich	1965	SPD	Bayern			
Carola Stauche	1952	CDU	Thüringen	Sonneberg – Saalfeld-Rudolstadt – Saale-Orla-Kreis	41,1	
Frank Steffel	1966	CDU	Berlin	Berlin-Reinickendorf	44,9	
Sonja Steffen	1963	SPD	Mecklenburg-Vorpommern			
Wolfgang Stefinger	1985	CSU	Bayern	München-Ost	44,7	
Albert Stegemann	1976	CDU	Niedersachsen	Mittelems	59,0	
Peter Stein	1968	CDU	Mecklenburg-Vorpommern	Rostock – Landkreis Rostock II	35,0	
Erika Steinbach	1943	independent	Hessen	Frankfurt am Main II	36,3	Left CDU parliamentary group on 15 January 2017
Peer Steinbrück	1947	SPD	Nordrhein-Westfalen			Resigned on 30 September 2016
Sebastian Steineke	1973	CDU	Brandenburg	Prignitz – Ostprignitz-Ruppin – Havelland I	33,5	
Johannes Steiniger	1987	CDU	Rheinland-Pfalz			
Kersten Steinke	1958	DIE LINKE	Thüringen			
Frank-Walter Steinmeier	1956	SPD	Brandenburg	Brandenburg an der Havel	33,1	Resigned on 25 February 2017, elected President of Germany
Christian von Stetten	1970	CDU	Baden-Württemberg	Schwäbisch Hall – Hohenlohe	52,3	
Dieter Stier	1964	CDU	Sachsen-Anhalt	Burgenland – Saalekreis	44,8	
Rita Stockhofe	1967	CDU	Nordrhein-Westfalen			
Gero Storjohann	1958	CDU	Schleswig-Holstein	Segeberg – Stormarn-Mitte	45,4	
Stephan Stracke	1974	CSU	Bayern	Ostallgäu	59,8	
Christoph Strässer	1949	SPD	Nordrhein-Westfalen			
Max Straubinger	1954	CSU	Bayern	Rottal-Inn	61,1	
Matthäus Strebl	1952	CSU	Bayern			
Wolfgang Strengmann-Kuhn	1964	GRÜNE	Hessen			In office since 27 January 2014 replacing Priska Hinz
Karin Strenz	1967	CDU	Mecklenburg-Vorpommern	Ludwigslust-Parchim II – Nordwestmecklenburg II – Landkreis Rostock I	43,0	
Thomas Stritzl	1957	CDU	Schleswig-Holstein			
Hans-Christian Ströbele	1939	GRÜNE	Berlin	Berlin-Friedrichshain – Kreuzberg – Prenzlauer Berg Ost	39,9	
Thomas Strobl (Heilbronn)	1960	CDU	Baden-Württemberg	Heilbronn	51,4	Resigned on 3 June 2016
Lena Strothmann	1952	CDU	Nordrhein-Westfalen			
Michael Stübgen	1959	CDU	Brandenburg	Elbe-Elster – Oberspreewald-Lausitz II	40,9	
Sabine Sütterlin-Waack	1958	CDU	Schleswig-Holstein	Flensburg – Schleswig	42,5	Resigned on 30 June 2017
Kerstin Tack	1968	SPD	Niedersachsen	Stadt Hannover I	43,5	
Kirsten Tackmann	1960	DIE LINKE	Brandenburg			
Azize Tank	1950	DIE LINKE	Berlin			
Peter Tauber	1974	CDU	Hessen	Main-Kinzig – Wetterau II – Schotten	48,8	
Claudia Tausend	1964	SPD	Bayern			
Frank Tempel	1969	DIE LINKE	Thüringen			
Harald Terpe	1954	GRÜNE	Mecklenburg-Vorpommern			
Michael Thews	1964	SPD	Nordrhein-Westfalen	Hamm – Unna II	43,3	
Karin Thissen	1960	SPD	Schleswig-Holstein			In office since 21 May 2015 replacing Hans-Peter Bartels
Franz Thönnes	1954	SPD	Schleswig-Holstein			
Wolfgang Tiefensee	1955	SPD	Sachsen			resigned on 11 December 2014
Antje Tillmann	1964	CDU	Thüringen	Erfurt – Weimar – Weimarer Land II	37,1	
Astrid Timmermann-Fechter	1963	CDU	Nordrhein-Westfalen			
Carsten Träger	1973	SPD	Bayern			
Markus Tressel	1977	GRÜNE	Saarland			
Jürgen Trittin	1954	GRÜNE	Niedersachsen			
Axel Troost	1954	DIE LINKE	Sachsen			
Hans-Peter Uhl	1944	CSU	Bayern	Munich West/Centre	42,6	
Markus Uhl	1979	CDU	Saarland			In office since 18 July 2017 replacing Alexander Funk
Volker Michael Ullrich	1975	CSU	Bayern	Augsburg-Stadt	44,4	
Alexander Ulrich	1971	DIE LINKE	Rheinland-Pfalz			
Arnold Vaatz	1955	CDU	Sachsen	Dresden II – Bautzen II	41,8	
Rüdiger Veit	1949	SPD	Hessen			
Oswin Veith	1961	CDU	Hessen	Wetterau I	47,1	
Julia Verlinden	1979	GRÜNE	Niedersachsen			
Thomas Viesehon	1973	CDU	Hessen	Waldeck	41,5	
Michael Vietz	1968	CDU	Niedersachsen			
Volkmar Vogel (Kleinsaara)	1959	CDU	Thüringen	Greiz – Altenburger Land	44,9	
Kathrin Vogler	1963	DIE LINKE	Nordrhein-Westfalen			
Ute Vogt	1964	SPD	Baden-Württemberg			
Sven Volmering	1976	CDU	Nordrhein-Westfalen			
Dirk Vöpel	1971	SPD	Nordrhein-Westfalen	Oberhausen – Wesel III	45,1	
Christel Voßbeck-Kayser	1961	CDU	Nordrhein-Westfalen			
Kees de Vries	1955	CDU	Sachsen-Anhalt	Anhalt	41,0	
Johann Wadephul	1963	CDU	Schleswig-Holstein	Rendsburg-Eckernförde	45,2	
Sahra Wagenknecht	1969	DIE LINKE	Nordrhein-Westfalen			
Doris Wagner	1963	GRÜNE	Bayern			
Beate Walter-Rosenheimer	1964	GRÜNE	Bayern			
Marco Wanderwitz	1975	CDU	Sachsen	Chemnitzer Umland – Erzgebirgskreis II	49,6	
Karl-Heinz Wange	1946	CDU	Nordrhein-Westfalen			In office since 6 July 2016 replacing Steffen Kampeter
Nina Warken	1979	CDU	Baden-Württemberg			
Halina Wawzyniak	1973	DIE LINKE	Berlin			
Gabi Weber	1955	SPD	Rheinland-Pfalz			
Kai Wegner	1972	CDU	Berlin	Berlin-Spandau – Charlottenburg North	39,2	
Albert Weiler	1965	CDU	Thüringen	Gera – Jena – Saale-Holzland-Kreis	36,1	
Harald Weinberg	1957	DIE LINKE	Bayern			
Marcus Weinberg (Hamburg)	1967	CDU	Hamburg			
Anja Weisgerber	1976	CSU	Bayern	Schweinfurt	54,8	
Peter Weiß (Emmendingen)	1956	CDU	Baden-Württemberg	Emmendingen – Lahr	52,3	
Sabine Weiss (Wesel I)	1958	CDU	Nordrhein-Westfalen	Wesel I	43,5	
Ingo Wellenreuther	1959	CDU	Baden-Württemberg	Karlsruhe-Stadt	39,5	
Karl-Georg Wellmann	1952	CDU	Berlin	Berlin-Steglitz-Zehlendorf	42,4	
Marian Wendt	1985	CDU	Sachsen	Nordsachsen	45,6	
Katrin Werner	1973	DIE LINKE	Rheinland-Pfalz			
Waldemar Westermayer	1953	CDU	Baden-Württemberg			In office since 1 July 2014 replacing Annette Schavan
Bernd Westphal	1960	SPD	Niedersachsen			
Kai Whittaker	1985	CDU	Baden-Württemberg	Rastatt	53,5	
Peter Wichtel	1949	CDU	Hessen	Offenbach	45,5	
Andrea Wicklein	1958	SPD	Brandenburg			
Annette Widmann-Mauz	1966	CDU	Baden-Württemberg	Tübingen	46,9	
Dirk Wiese	1983	SPD	Nordrhein-Westfalen			
Heinz Wiese (Ehingen)	1945	CDU	Baden-Württemberg			
Klaus-Peter Willsch	1961	CDU	Hessen	Rheingau-Taunus – Limburg	52,1	
Valerie Wilms	1954	GRÜNE	Schleswig-Holstein			
Elisabeth Winkelmeier-Becker	1962	CDU	Nordrhein-Westfalen	Rhein-Sieg-Kreis I	49,6	
Oliver Wittke	1966	CDU	Nordrhein-Westfalen			
Dagmar Wöhrl	1954	CSU	Bayern	Nuremberg North	39,4	
Waltraud Wolff (Wolmirstedt)	1956	SPD	Sachsen-Anhalt			
Birgit Wöllert	1950	DIE LINKE	Brandenburg			
Barbara Woltmann	1957	CDU	Niedersachsen			
Jörn Wunderlich	1960	DIE LINKE	Sachsen			
Gülistan Yüksel	1962	SPD	Nordrhein-Westfalen			
Hubertus Zdebel	1954	DIE LINKE	Nordrhein-Westfalen			
Tobias Zech	1981	CSU	Bayern			
Heinrich Zertik	1957	CDU	Nordrhein-Westfalen			
Emmi Zeulner	1987	CSU	Bayern	Kulmbach	56,9	
Dagmar Ziegler	1960	SPD	Brandenburg			
Stefan Zierke	1970	SPD	Brandenburg			
Matthias Zimmer	1961	CDU	Hessen	Frankfurt am Main I	40,2	
Jens Zimmermann	1981	SPD	Hessen			
Pia-Beate Zimmermann	1956	DIE LINKE	Niedersachsen			
Sabine Zimmermann (politician) (Zwickau)	1960	DIE LINKE	Sachsen			
Manfred Zöllmer	1950	SPD	Nordrhein-Westfalen	Wuppertal I	40,7	
Gudrun Zollner	1960	CSU	Bayern			
Brigitte Zypries	1953	SPD	Hessen	Darmstadt	37,3	

== See also ==
- Politics of Germany
- List of Bundestag Members
