= Alexandra Dinges-Dierig =

German politician

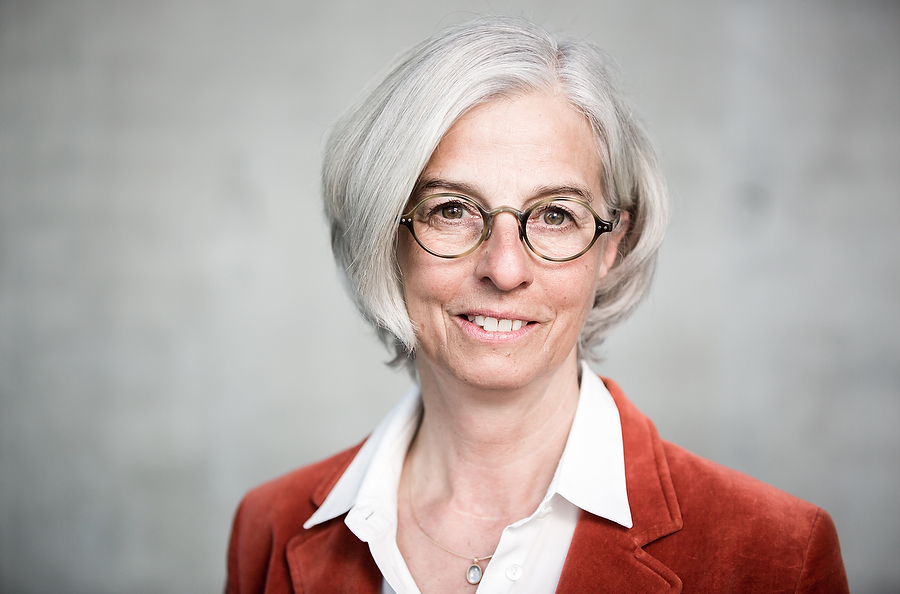
- Dinges-Dierig in 2014

Member of the Bundestag
- In office 22 September 2013 – 24 October 2017

Personal details
- Born: 17 February 1953 (age 73) Lübeck, East Germany
- Party: CDU
- Education: University of Freiburg

Alexandra Dinges-Dierig (born 17 February 1953) is a former German politician from the Christian Democratic Union who served as a member of the Hamburg Parliament and the Bundestag.

== See also ==
- List of members of the 18th Bundestag
