= Gudrun Zollner =

German politician

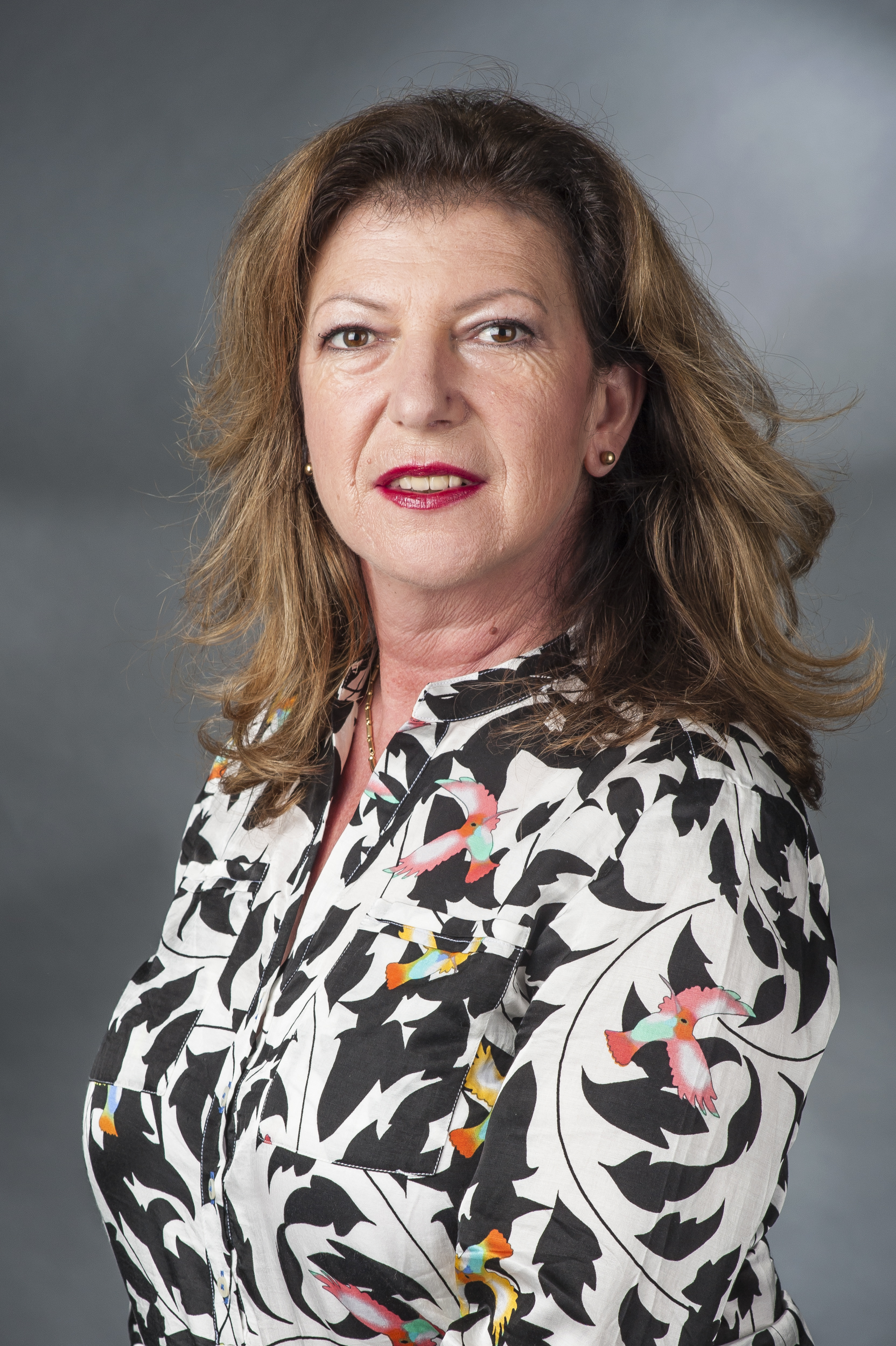
Gudrun Zollner in 2014.

Gudrun Anna Therese Zollner (born 21 July 1960) is a German politician from the Christian Social Union in Bavaria who was a member of the German Bundestag from 2013 to 2017.

== Political career ==
Zollner was elected on the Bavaria State List in the 2013 German federal election.

In the 2021 German federal election, Zollner was number 24 on the Bavaria state list, but was not elected.

== See also ==
- List of members of the 18th Bundestag
