= Gabriele Schmidt =

German politician

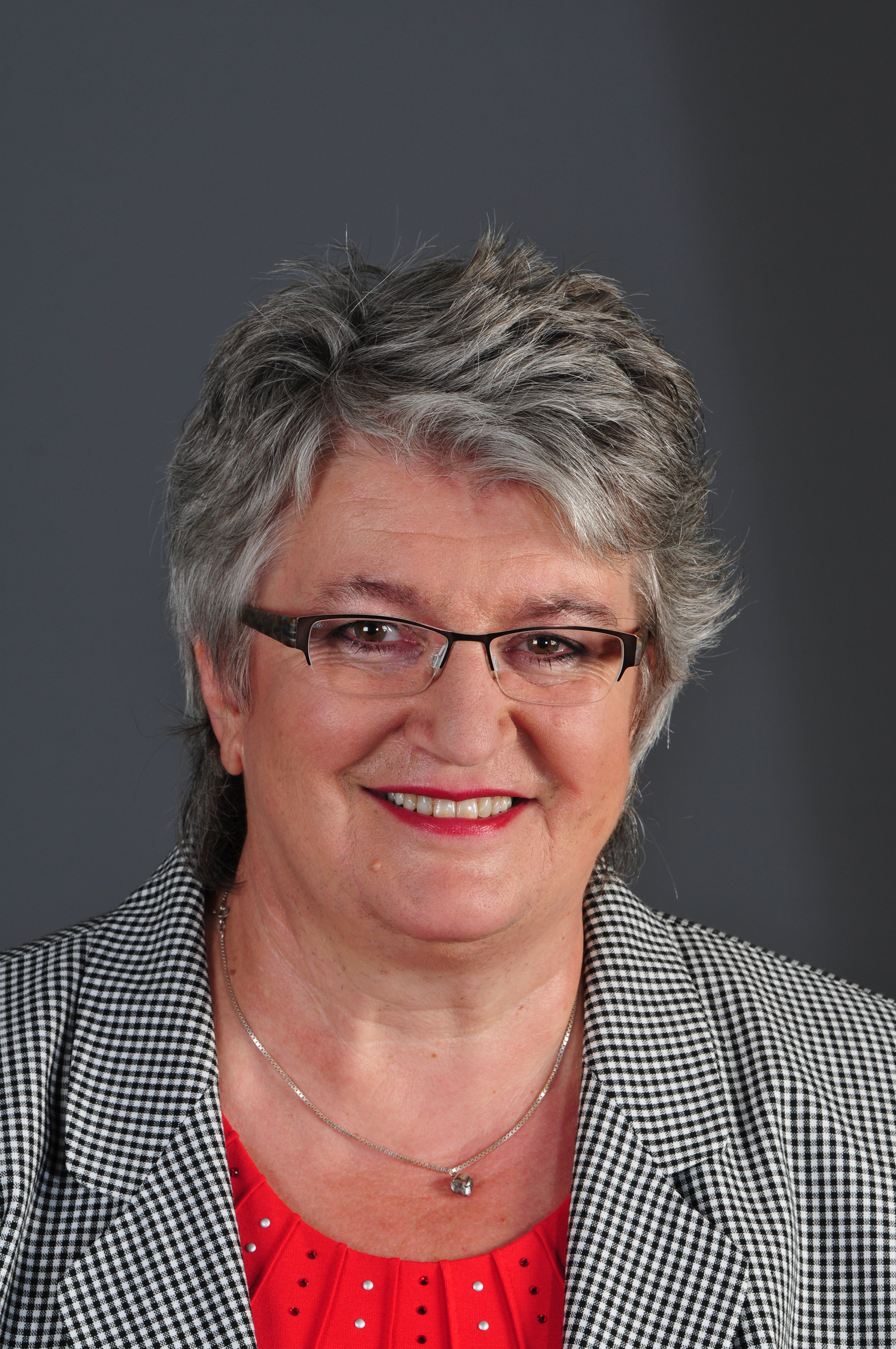
- Gabriele Schmidt in 2014

Member of the Bundestag
- In office 2013–2017
- Constituency: Baden-Württemberg

Personal details
- Born: Gabriele Isele; 2 July 1956 (age 69) Grafenhausen, West Germany
- Party: CDU

Gabriele Schmidt (née Isele; born 2 July 1956) is a German politician from the Christian Democratic Union (CDU). She was a member of the Bundestag from 2013 to 2017.

== Life ==
After graduating from Hochrhein-Gymnasium Waldshut in 1975, she began an apprenticeship as an industrial clerk and subsequently worked in this profession for medium-sized companies. Most recently, she was sales manager at a medium-sized company in Horheim until her election to the German Bundestag.

Schmidt is widowed.

== Political career ==
She joined the CDU in 1974 and the Christian Democratic Employees' Association in 1976. Since 2008, she has been chairwoman of the CDU municipal association in Ühlingen-Birkendorf. Since 1992, she has been treasurer of the CDA South Baden district association. Since 2010, she has been deputy district chairwoman of the CDU Waldshut district association and deputy district chairwoman of the CDA. She also serves as chairwoman of the CDA Waldshut district association.

On 22 September 2013, Schmidt was elected to the German Bundestag in the 2013 German federal election, placing 13th on the CDU state list for Baden-Württemberg. She represented the Waldshut constituency in the 18th Bundestag. Since March 2017, Schmidt served as deputy chair of the Committee on Labor and Social Affairs. She was not re-elected in the 2017 German federal election.

== Other commitments ==
Gabriele Schmidt volunteers as deputy chairwoman of the sponsoring association of the women's and children's shelter in the district of Waldshut eV.
