= Azize Tank =

German politician

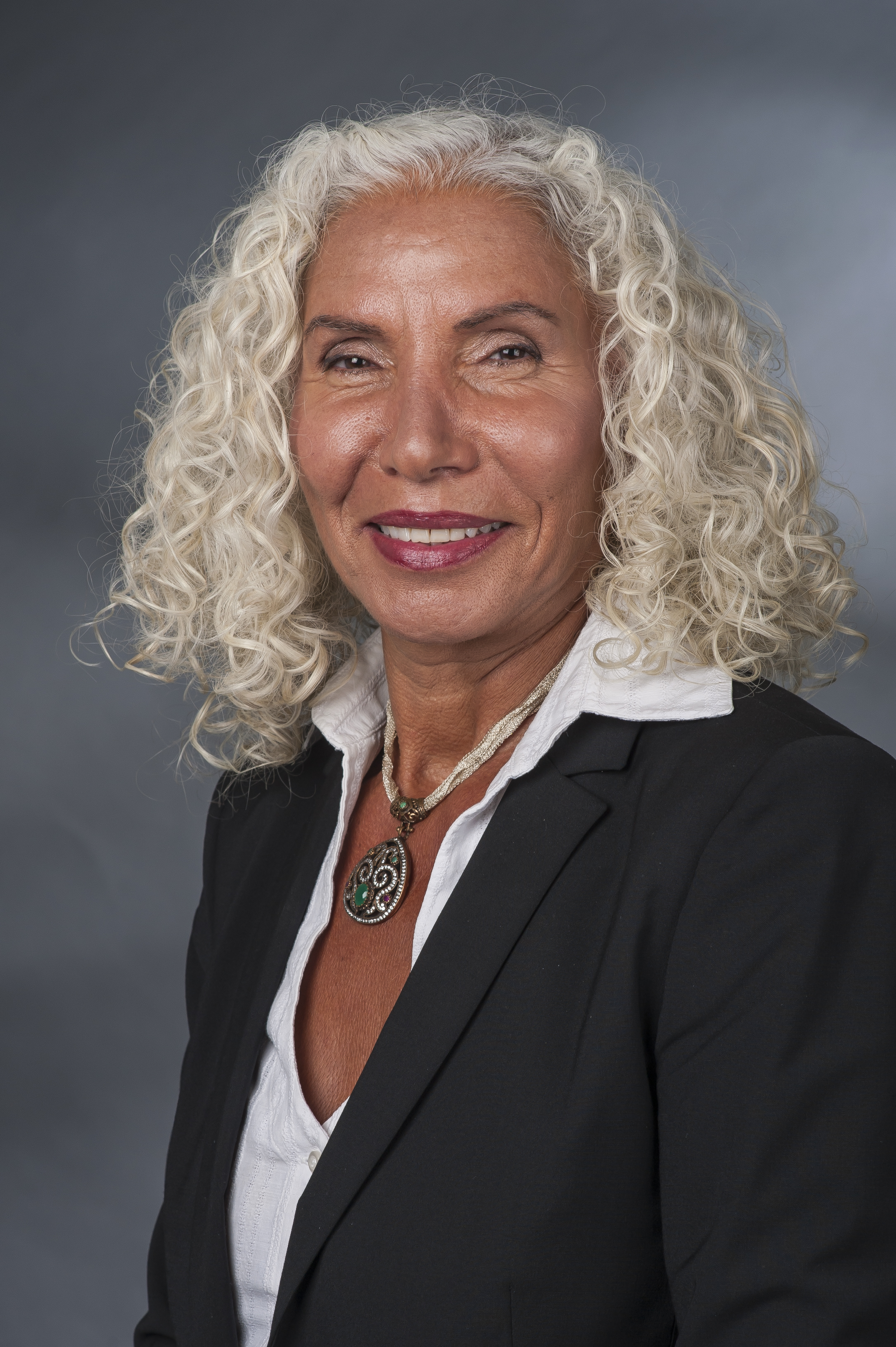
- Tank in 2014

Member of the Bundestag
- In office 22 October 2013 – 24 October 2017

Personal details
- Born: 1 January 1950 (age 76) Turkey
- Party: The Left
- Children: 2
- Website: www.azize-tank.de

Azize Tank (Turkish pronunciation: [aˈzize] ah-ZEE-zeh; born 1 January 1950) is a Turkish-born German politician who served as an Immigration Officer for Charlottenburg-Wilmersdorf, and as a member of the Bundestag for Berlin representing The Left.

== Biography ==
After her school education, Tank worked as a civil servant in postal administration in Istanbul. She has lived in Germany since 1972. For a year she worked in a porcelain factory in Upper Palatinate, Bavaria. She then completed additional training as a social worker in Berlin, with her main focus being to work with children and young adults with a migration background, until she worked from 1990 to 2009 as Immigration Officer for Charlottenburg-Wilmersdorf.

She is married to lawyer Hans-Eberhard Schultz and has two adult daughters.

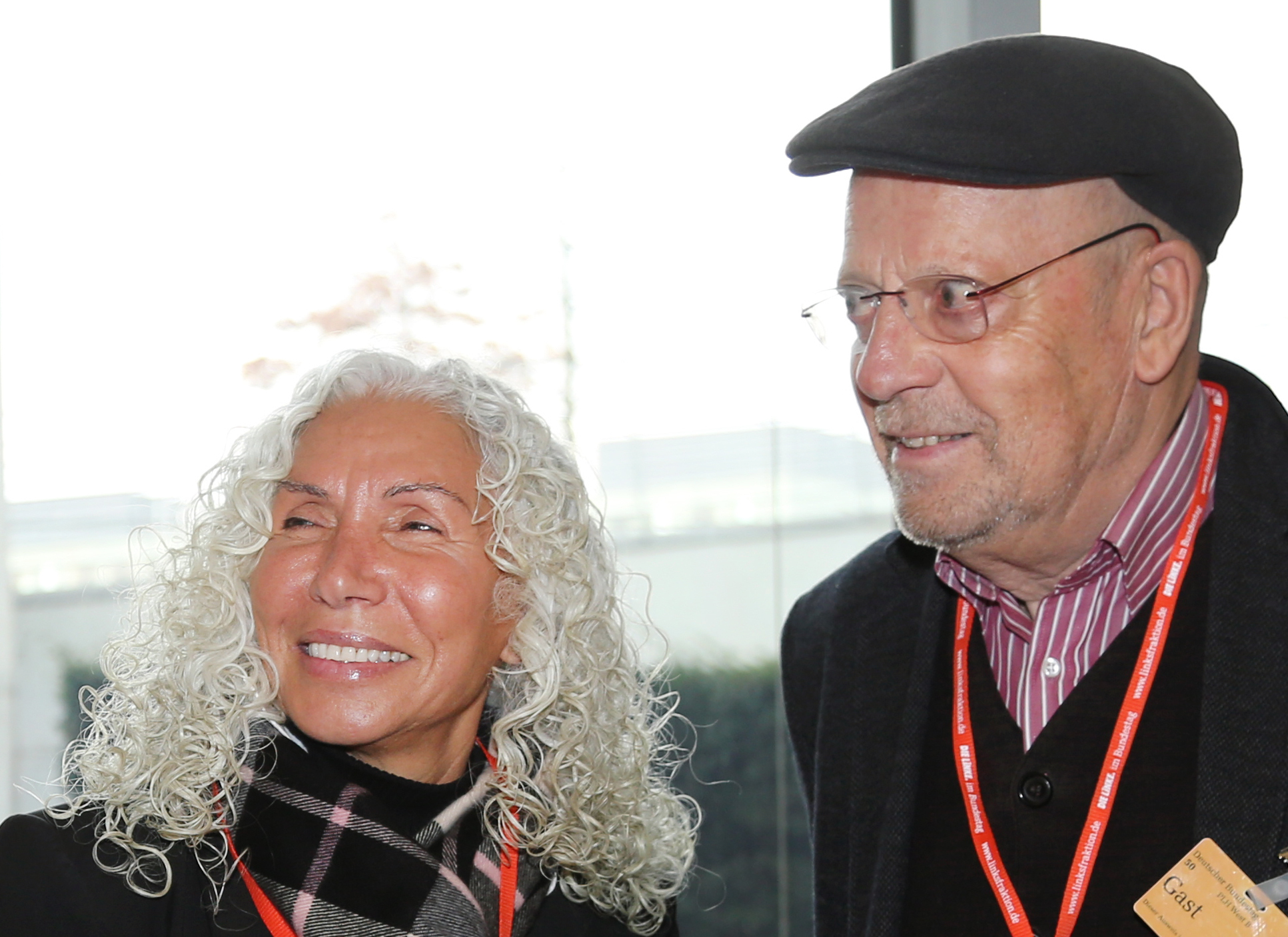
Tank with her husband Hans-Eberhard Schultz
