= Harald Petzold =

German politician (b. 1962)

Harald Petzold (born 28 March 1962 in Seebad Heringsdorf) is a German politician from The Left.

== Life ==
Petzold studied music and German language. He worked as a teacher in Brandenburg. From 1990 to 1999 Petzold was a member of the Landtag of Brandenburg. Since 2013 Petzold has been a member of the German Bundestag.
