= Barbara Woltmann =

German politician

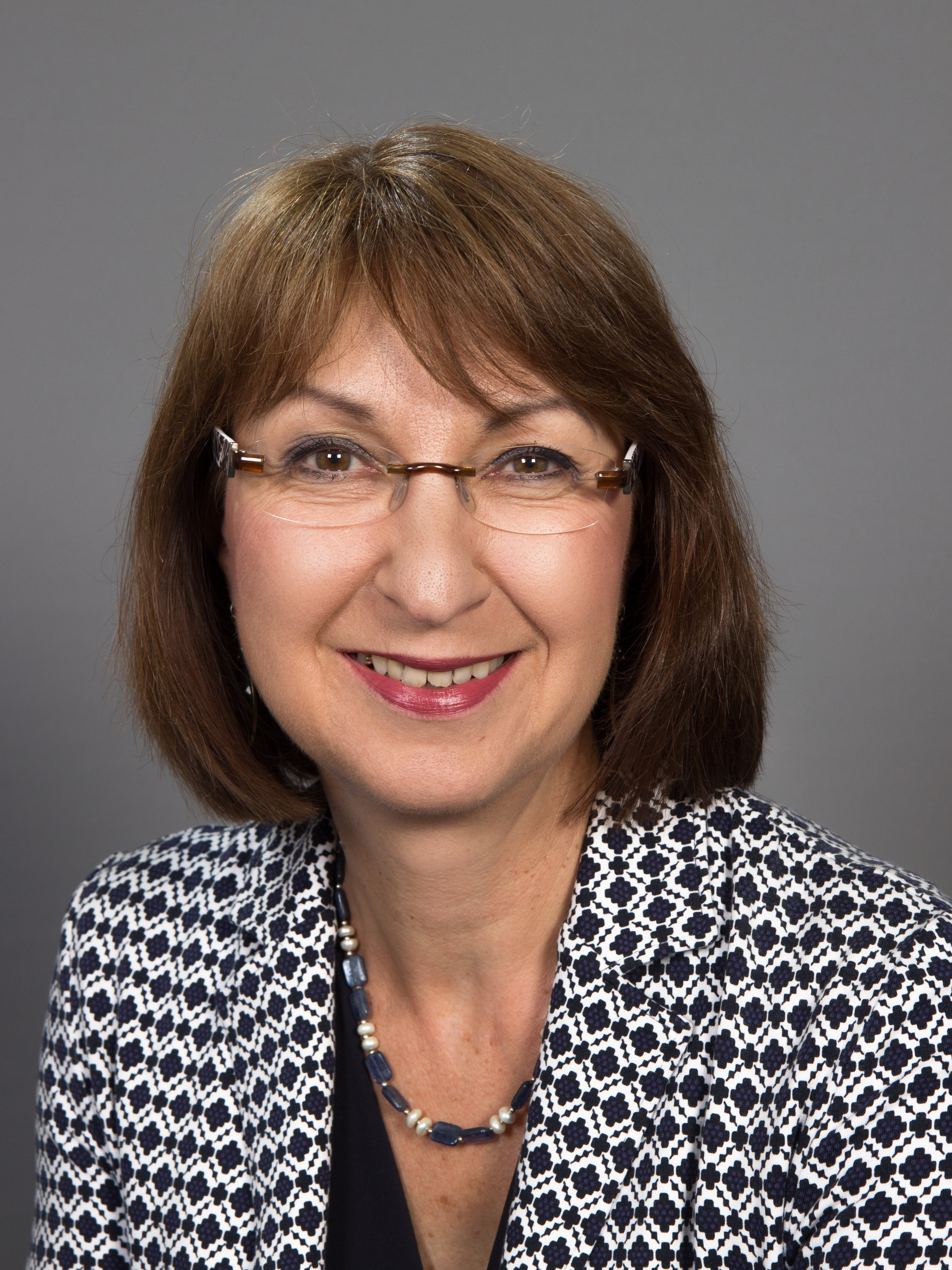

Member of Bundestag
- In office October 2013 – 2017

Vice President of the Lower Saxony State Office for Consumer Protection and Food Safety (LAVES)
- Incumbent
- Assumed office 1 August 2018

Personal details
- Born: 23 January 1957 (age 69) Rheinberg, Germany
- Party: CDU
- Education: University of Bonn
- Occupation: Politician

Barbara Woltmann (born 23 January 1957 in Rheinberg, Germany) is a German politician (CDU) and since August 2018 Vice President of the Lower Saxony State Office for Consumer Protection and Food Safety (LAVES).

== Biography ==
Barbara Woltmann passed her bachelor's exams in 1976 at the Amplonius-Gymnasium Rheinberg and then studied law at the Rheinische Friedrich-Wilhelms-Universität in Bonn. In 1986, she became a civil servant in the state of Lower Saxony. Until 2004, she worked in the agricultural structure administration of the state of Lower Saxony. Since 2005, she has worked in the Oldenburg government office, of which she was deputy head since 2006. Her fields of activity are regional planning and state development. From October 2013 to 2017, Barbara Woltmann was a member of the Bundestag. She then returned to the Lower Saxony state service and had been working at the Office for Regional Land Development Weser-Ems since March 2018. On 1 August 2018 she took up her position as Vice President of the Lower Saxony State Office for Consumer Protection and Food Safety (LAVES). After a two-year probationary period, she was officially appointed Vice President for life, following prior approval by the Cabinet in a meeting on 15 July 2020.

== Political career ==
Barbara Woltmann has been a member of the Christian Democratic Union (CDU) since 1982. In 1999, she was elected deputy state chairwoman of the Oldenburg CDU state association. She held this office until 2021. As an assessor, Woltmann sat on the state executive committee of the CDU of Lower Saxony from 2008 to 2012 and was re-elected to this body in 2018, where she served until 2021. She has been a member of federal and state expert committees in the field of agriculture, the environment and consumer protection since 2018. Previously, she was a member of the expert committees on domestic policy and chairwoman of the state committee on Europe and regional development from 2008 to 2013. From 2019 to 2021, she chaired the state specialist committee on agriculture and rural areas in the Oldenburg state association.

From 2001 to 2011 and from 2016 to 2020, Woltmann was a member of the district council of the Ammerland district as well as the council of the municipality of Bad Zwischenahn, where she served in various capacities as parliamentary group chairwoman and councillor. From 2013 to 2021, she was a member of the district executive of the CDU Ammerland, the district executive of the Women's Union Ammerland, as well as the state executive of the Women's Union Oldenburg and Lower Saxony and the federal executive of the Women's Union.

Barbara Woltmann was also chairwoman of the supervisory board of the community-owned Bad Zwischenahn rehabilitation clinic from 2001 to 2011.

Since November 2021, she has been a member of the City Council of Oldenburg, where she is a member of the Committee for Urban Greening, Environment and Climate, the Committee for Integration and Migration, and the Committee for Economic Development, Digitization and International Cooperation.

In addition, Barbara Woltmann is a member of the Board of Directors of the Oldenburg Clinic.

=== Member of parliament ===
Through the 2013 Bundestag election, Woltmann became a member of the German Bundestag via position 29 on the CDU state list of Lower Saxony. She was a full member of the Committee on Internal Affairs. She was a deputy chair of the Subcommittee on Local Government. She was a member of the 2nd Investigation Committee of the 18th legislative period and a deputy member of the Legal Affairs Committee of the German Bundestag, as well as a member of the Advisory Council of the Alliance for Democracy and Tolerance. In 2017, Woltmann left the Bundestag.
