= Marion Herdan =

Marion Marga Herdan (born 1958) is a CDU politician from Schleswig-Holstein, who served a brief term as a member of the German Bundestag in 2017 and previously held a seat in the Landtag of Schleswig-Holstein.

== Life and Career ==
Marion Herdan, née Pflüger, was born on 20 October 1958 in Kiel. She graduated from high school in 1977 and, after undergoing training, was employed by her husband, a lawyer. She is evangelical and has two sons.

From 1998 to 2010, Herdan was a member of the city council of Molfsee. She was elected to the State Parliament of Schleswig-Holstein in 2009. From June 2017 to the federal election in the same year, she served a brief term as a member of the German Bundestag, by taking a seat of another parliamentary member who left.
