= Rainer Hajek =

German politician

Rainer Hajek (born 1945) is a German politician of the Christian Democratic Union (CDU). From 2016 to 2017, he was member of the Bundestag.

== Life ==
Hajek was born on 25 January 1945 in Wilhelmshaven. After training as a tradesman, he served for two years in the Bundeswehr in the 1960s. In the following years, he worked as a merchant. He retired in 2009.

Rainer Hajek is married and has three children.

== Political work ==
Hajek joined the CDU in 1996 and was active in the Senioren-Union, the party's elderly's wing. On 1 November 2016, he joined the Bundestag, getting the seat of Heiko Schmelzle after he had resigned from his seat.
