= Jutta Eckenbach =

Jutta Eckenbach (born 1952 in Essen) is a German politician of the CDU. From 2013 to 2017, she was member of the Bundestag.

== Career ==
Born on 22 January 1952 in Essen, she joined the CDU in 1981 and was in the Essen city council from 1989 to 2013. In the German Federal election of 2013, she was elected member of the Bundestag through the state list.
