= Michaela Engelmeier =

German politician (born 1960)

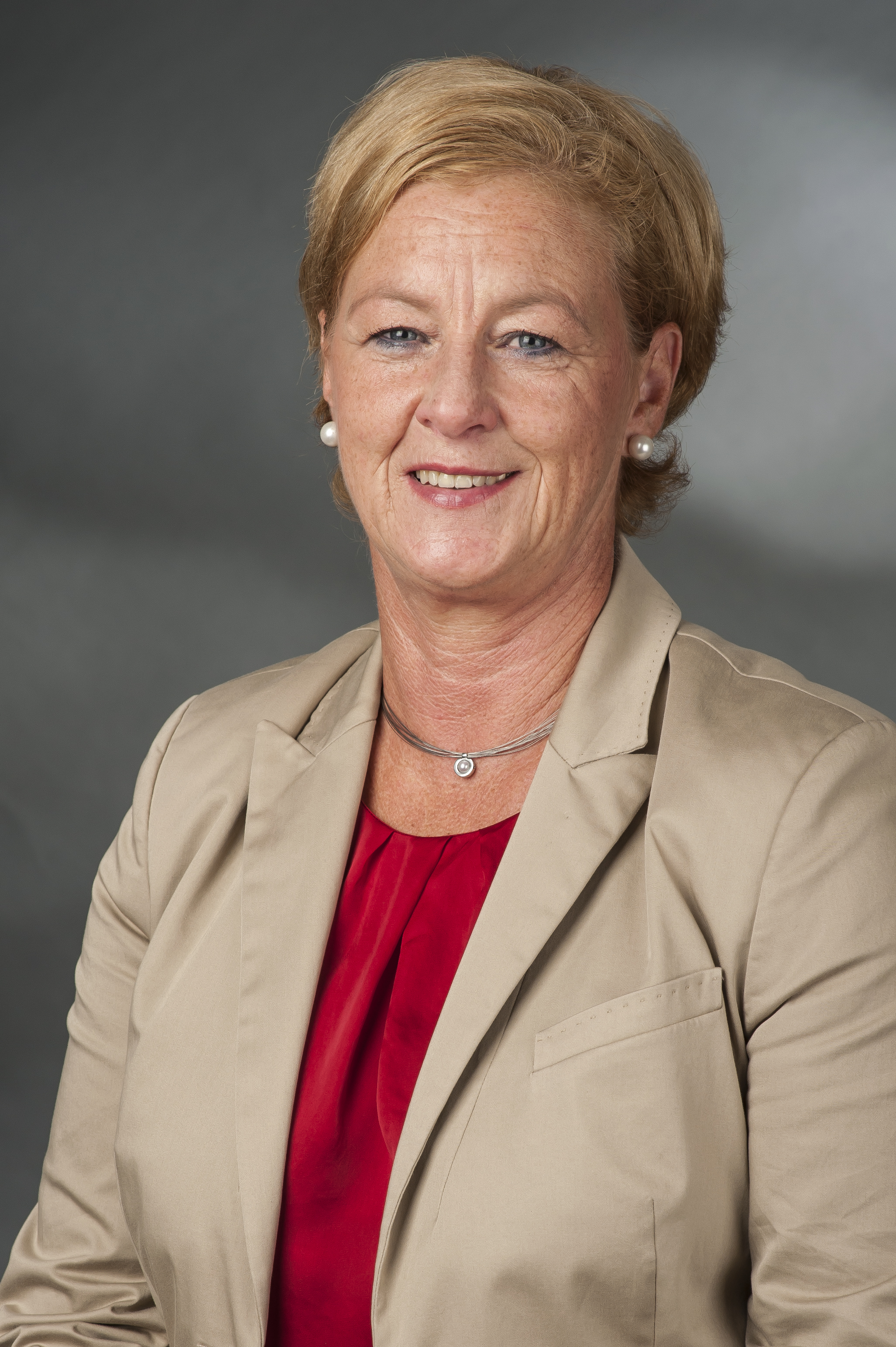

Personal details
- Born: Michaela Barbara Engelmeier; 10 October 1970 (age 55) Hagen, North Rhine-Westphalia, Germany
- Party: SPD
- Occupation: Politician

Michaela Barbara Engelmeier (formerly Engelmeier-Heite, 10 October 1960, Hagen, Germany) is a German politician (SPD). She was a member of the German Bundestag from 2013 to 2017. She is a former member of the German national women's judo team. From 2020 to 2022, she was the first Secretary General of the German-Israeli Society. Since September 2022, she has been chairwoman of the board of SoVD.

== Biography ==
Engelmeier studied economics and is a state-certified and recognized educator. She finished her studies without a degree. She worked as a reference teacher and judo teacher at a Special School for social and emotional development in Gummersbach and was vice-president of the Landessportbund NRW. Engelmeier was an active competitive athlete in the Judo Bundesliga for many years as well as a member of the German national women's judo team. as well as a member of the German national women's judo team.

Michaela Engelmeier has two children and three grandchildren.

== Politics career ==
From 2004 to 2020, she was a member of the Oberbergischer district council. From 2009 to 2021, she was a member of the SPD party executive committee.

In 2005, 2009 and 2013 she ran for the German Bundestag in the Oberbergischer Kreis constituency, but was clearly defeated by the CDU candidate Klaus-Peter Flosbach. In 2013, however, she entered the Bundestag via the SPD state list for North Rhine-Westphalia (list position 18). She was a member of the Committee for Economic Cooperation and Development, sports policy spokeswoman for the SPD parliamentary group in the Sports Committee and a member of the SPD parliamentary group executive committee.

At the federal party convention of the SPD in Dresden from 13 to 15 November 2009, she was elected to the federal executive board. She became one of 37 assessors and was assigned the task of "Children, Youth, Sport and Rural Affairs". On 5 December 2011, and December 2013, she was re-elected to the federal executive board in the first ballot, although the number of assessors was reduced to 26. She was an assessor on the federal party executive until December 2021.

In 2017 she ran again for the Bundestag in her constituency, but only achieved 26.7% and was thus again clearly defeated by the CDU candidate Carsten Brodesser. Due to the poor results of her party, she was not able to enter the Bundestag again this time via the state list (list position 20). She left the Bundestag. She also failed to re-enter the Bundestag in the 2021 federal election.

== Association activity ==
From August 2018, she headed the Berlin office of Maccabi Germany. In 2020, she was appointed to the newly created post of secretary general of the German-Israeli Society. She resigned from this office at her own request in July 2022.

In 2022, she was appointed by the federal board of SoVD to the newly created office of chairwoman of the board.
