= Oberbergischer Kreis (electoral district) =

Federal electoral district of Germany

98 Oberbergischer Kreis
- Electoral district for the Bundestag
- Oberbergischer Kreis in 2025
- State: North Rhine-Westphalia
- Population: 272,100 (2019)
- Electorate: 206,640 (2021)
- Major settlements: Gummersbach; Wiehl; Radevormwald
- Area: 918.8 km^{2}

Current electoral district
- Created: 1949
- Party: CDU
- Member: Carsten Brodesser
- Elected: 2017, 2021, 2025

Oberbergischer Kreis is an electoral constituency (German: Wahlkreis) represented in the Bundestag. It elects one member via first-past-the-post voting. Under the current constituency numbering system, it is designated as constituency 98. It is located in southern North Rhine-Westphalia, comprising the Oberbergischer Kreis district.

Oberbergischer Kreis was created for the inaugural 1949 federal election. Since 2017, it has been represented by Carsten Brodesser of the Christian Democratic Union (CDU).

== Geography ==
Oberbergischer Kreis is located in southern North Rhine-Westphalia. As of the 2021 federal election, it is coterminous with the Oberbergischer Kreis district.

== History ==
Oberbergischer Kreis was created in 1949. It was named Oberbergischer Kreis upon its creation, but renamed to Oberbergischer Kreis – Siegkreis II in the 1965 and 1969 elections. In the 1972 and 1976 elections, it was named Oberbergischer Kreis – Rhein-Sieg-Kreis II. It returned to its current name in the 1980 election. In the 1949 election, it was North Rhine-Westphalia constituency 12 in the numbering system. From 1953 through 1961, it was number 71. From 1965 through 1976, it was number 65. From 1980 through 1998, it was number 66. From 2002 through 2009, it was number 100. In the 2013 through 2021 elections, it was number 99. From the 2025 election, it has been number 98.

Originally, it was coterminous with the Oberbergischer Kreis district. In the 1965 through 1976 elections, it also contained the entirety of Siegkreis district (Rhein-Sieg-Kreis district from 1972) excluding the modern municipalities of Bad Honnef, Königswinter, Niederkassel, Troisdorf, and Sankt Augustin. It acquired its current borders in the 1980 election.

Election	No.	Name	Borders
1949	12	Oberbergischer Kreis	Oberbergischer Kreis district
1953	71	Oberbergischer Kreis	Oberbergischer Kreis district
1957	71	Oberbergischer Kreis	Oberbergischer Kreis district
1961	71	Oberbergischer Kreis	Oberbergischer Kreis district
1965	65	Oberbergischer Kreis – Siegkreis II	Oberbergischer Kreis district; Siegkreis district (excluding Bad Honnef, Königswinter, Niederkassel, Troisdorf, and Sankt Augustin municipalities)
1969	65	Oberbergischer Kreis – Siegkreis II	Oberbergischer Kreis district; Siegkreis district (excluding Bad Honnef, Königswinter, Niederkassel, Troisdorf, and Sankt Augustin municipalities)
1972	65	Oberbergischer Kreis – Rhein-Sieg-Kreis II	Oberbergischer Kreis district; Rhein-Sieg-Kreis district (excluding Bad Honnef, Königswinter, Niederkassel, Troisdorf, and Sankt Augustin municipalities)
1976	65	Oberbergischer Kreis – Rhein-Sieg-Kreis II	Oberbergischer Kreis district; Rhein-Sieg-Kreis district (excluding Bad Honnef, Königswinter, Niederkassel, Troisdorf, and Sankt Augustin municipalities)
1980	66	Oberbergischer Kreis	Oberbergischer Kreis district
1983	66	Oberbergischer Kreis	Oberbergischer Kreis district
1987	66	Oberbergischer Kreis	Oberbergischer Kreis district
1990	66	Oberbergischer Kreis	Oberbergischer Kreis district
1994	66	Oberbergischer Kreis	Oberbergischer Kreis district
1998	66	Oberbergischer Kreis	Oberbergischer Kreis district
2002	100	Oberbergischer Kreis	Oberbergischer Kreis district
2005	100	Oberbergischer Kreis	Oberbergischer Kreis district
2009	100	Oberbergischer Kreis	Oberbergischer Kreis district
2013	99	Oberbergischer Kreis	Oberbergischer Kreis district
2017	99	Oberbergischer Kreis	Oberbergischer Kreis district
2021	99	Oberbergischer Kreis	Oberbergischer Kreis district
2025	98	Oberbergischer Kreis	Oberbergischer Kreis district

== Members ==
The constituency has been held by the Christian Democratic Union (CDU) during all but one Bundestag term since 1949. It was first represented by August Dresbach 1949 to 1965, followed by Gustav Stein until 1972. Horst Waffenschmidt was elected in 1972 and served until 1998. The Social Democratic Party (SPD)'s candidate Friedhelm Julius Beucher won the constituency in 1998, but the CDU regained it in 2002. Klaus-Peter Flosbach then represented it until 2017. Carsten Brodesser of the CDU was elected as representative in 2017 and re-elected in 2021 and 2025.

Election	Member	Party	%
1949	August Dresbach	CDU	37.0
1953	August Dresbach	CDU	43.5
1957	August Dresbach	CDU	56.0
1961	August Dresbach	CDU	45.0
1965	Gustav Stein	CDU	51.9
1969	Gustav Stein	CDU	45.7
1972	Horst Waffenschmidt	CDU	47.7
1976	Horst Waffenschmidt	CDU	51.7
1980	Horst Waffenschmidt	CDU	49.1
1983	Horst Waffenschmidt	CDU	55.0
1987	Horst Waffenschmidt	CDU	50.3
1990	Horst Waffenschmidt	CDU	50.1
1994	Horst Waffenschmidt	CDU	48.8
1998	Friedhelm Julius Beucher	SPD	44.9
2002	Klaus-Peter Flosbach	CDU	45.2
2005	Klaus-Peter Flosbach	CDU	49.1
2009	Klaus-Peter Flosbach	CDU	48.4
2013	Klaus-Peter Flosbach	CDU	52.2
2017	Carsten Brodesser	CDU	43.7
2021	Carsten Brodesser	CDU	33.9
2025	Carsten Brodesser	CDU	36.9

== Election results ==
=== 2025 election ===
Federal election (2025): Oberbergischer Kreis
Notes:	Blue background denotes the winner of the electorate vote. Pink background denotes a candidate elected from their party list. Yellow background denotes an electorate win by a list member, or other incumbent. A ✓ or ✗ denotes status of any incumbent, win or lose respectively.						
Party	Candidate	Votes	%	±%	Party votes	%	±%
CDU	✓ Carsten Brodesser	62,101	36.9	▲3.0	53,401	31.7	▲3.9
AfD	Bernd Rummler	36,265	21.6	▲12.0	35,721	21.2	▲11.6
SPD	Pascal Reinhardt	34,869	20.7	▼6.1	29,969	17.8	▼9.0
Greens	Sabine Grützmacher	14,812	8.8	▼3.2	16,032	9.5	▼3.1
Left	Jan Köstering	10,064	6.0	▲3.1	10,598	6.3	▲3.0
BSW					7,737	4.6	
FDP	Sebastian Diener	5,476	3.3	▼6.6	7,771	4.6	▼7.9
FW	Tobias Vormstein	2,914	1.7	▲0.3	1,189	0.7	▼0.2
Tierschutzpartei					2,369	1.4	▼0.1
Volt	Marius Roth	1,758	1.0		1,032	0.6	▲0.4
PARTEI				▼1.8	1,010	0.6	▼0.4
dieBasis				▼1.8	589	0.3	▼1.4
PdF					340	0.2	▲0.1
BD					302	0.2	
Team Todenhöfer					253	0.2	▼0.3
Values					180	0.1	
MERA25					68	0.0	
MLPD					46	0.0	0.0
Bündnis C							▼0.4
Pirates							▼0.4
Gesundheitsforschung							▼0.1
ÖDP							▼0.1
Humanists							▼0.1
SGP						0.0	0.0
Informal votes		1,577			1,229		
Total valid votes		168,259			168,607		
Turnout		169,836	83.1	▲5.6			
CDU hold	Majority	25,836	15.3				

=== 2021 election ===
Federal election (2021): Oberbergischer Kreis
Notes:	Blue background denotes the winner of the electorate vote. Pink background denotes a candidate elected from their party list. Yellow background denotes an electorate win by a list member, or other incumbent. A ✓ or ✗ denotes status of any incumbent, win or lose respectively.						
Party	Candidate	Votes	%	±%	Party votes	%	±%
CDU	✓ Carsten Brodesser	53,757	33.9	▼9.8	44,018	27.7	▼8.7
SPD	Michaela Engelmeier	42,461	26.8	▲0.1	42,413	26.7	▲4.1
Greens	Sabine Grützmacher	19,015	12.0	▲5.9	19,959	12.6	▲6.1
FDP	Jörg Von Polheim	15,636	9.9	▲2.0	19,796	12.5	▼1.3
AfD	Bernd Rummler	15,071	9.5	▼0.6	15,211	9.6	▼1.0
Left	Diyar Agu	4,587	2.9	▼2.3	5,153	3.2	▼3.1
PARTEI	Philipp Ernst Wüster	2,887	1.8		1,622	1.0	▲0.3
dieBasis	Markos Pavlidis	2,847	1.8		2,809	1.8	
Tierschutzpartei					2,426	1.5	▲0.7
FW	Christian Abstoß	2,246	1.4		1,434	0.9	▲0.7
Bündnis C					699	0.4	
Pirates					652	0.4	0.0
Team Todenhöfer					635	0.4	
Volt					403	0.3	
LIEBE					236	0.1	
Gesundheitsforschung					221	0.1	0.0
ÖDP					183	0.1	0.0
LfK					178	0.1	
NPD					153	0.1	▼0.1
PdF					110	0.1	
Humanists					104	0.1	0.0
V-Partei3					89	0.1	0.0
du.					78	0.0	
LKR					34	0.0	
MLPD					25	0.0	0.0
SGP					18	0.0	0.0
DKP					15	0.0	0.0
Informal votes		1,639			1,472		
Total valid votes		158,507			158,674		
Turnout		160,146	77.5	▲2.4			
CDU hold	Majority	11,296	7.1	▼9.9			

=== 2017 election ===
Federal election (2017): Oberbergischer Kreis
Notes:	Blue background denotes the winner of the electorate vote. Pink background denotes a candidate elected from their party list. Yellow background denotes an electorate win by a list member, or other incumbent. A ✓ or ✗ denotes status of any incumbent, win or lose respectively.						
Party	Candidate	Votes	%	±%	Party votes	%	±%
CDU	Carsten Brodesser	67,603	43.7	▼8.5	56,567	36.5	▼8.8
SPD	Michaela Engelmeier	41,305	26.7	▼3.4	35,078	22.6	▼4.4
AfD	Stefan Zühlke	15,648	10.1	▲7.1	16,413	10.6	▲5.6
FDP	Heinz Jörg Kloppenburg	12,123	7.8	▲5.7	21,353	13.8	▲8.1
Greens	Michael Braun	9,489	6.1	▲1.0	9,995	6.4	▼0.5
Left	Diyar Agu	7,999	5.2	▲0.9	9,887	6.4	▲1.0
Tierschutzpartei					1,238	0.8	
PARTEI					1,099	0.7	▲0.3
Pirates					640	0.4	▼1.5
AD-DEMOKRATEN					531	0.3	
Independent	Felix Staratschek	464	0.3				
FW					386	0.2	0.0
NPD					328	0.2	▼0.7
ÖDP					253	0.2	0.0
DM					232	0.1	
Volksabstimmung					204	0.1	▼0.1
DiB					186	0.1	
Gesundheitsforschung					175	0.1	
BGE					153	0.1	
V-Partei³					148	0.1	
Die Humanisten					91	0.1	
MLPD					52	0.0	0.0
DKP					16	0.0	
SGP					9	0.0	0.0
Informal votes		1,962			1,559		
Total valid votes		154,631			155,034		
Turnout		156,593	75.1	▲3.1			
CDU hold	Majority	26,298	17.0	▼5.1			

=== 2013 election ===
Federal election (2013): Oberbergischer Kreis
Notes:	Blue background denotes the winner of the electorate vote. Pink background denotes a candidate elected from their party list. Yellow background denotes an electorate win by a list member, or other incumbent. A ✓ or ✗ denotes status of any incumbent, win or lose respectively.						
Party	Candidate	Votes	%	±%	Party votes	%	±%
CDU	✓ Klaus-Peter Flosbach	77,800	52.2	▲3.8	67,437	45.3	▲7.0
SPD	Michaela Engelmeier	44,773	30.1	▲2.3	40,185	27.0	▲3.0
Greens	Michael Braun	7,675	5.2	▼1.6	10,347	6.9	▼1.7
Left	Georg Hewald	6,373	4.3	▼2.2	8,055	5.4	▼2.0
AfD	Rolf Plötz	4,455	3.0		7,487	5.0	
FDP	Jörg von Polheim	3,226	2.2	▼6.6	8,446	5.7	▼11.2
Pirates	Heiko Knotte	2,769	1.9		2,849	1.9	▲0.5
NPD	Frank Ipach	1,491	1.0	▼0.2	1,329	0.9	0.0
PARTEI					629	0.4	
PRO					473	0.3	
FW					364	0.2	
Volksabstimmung					363	0.2	▲0.1
Independent	Felix Johannes Staratschek	354	0.2				
ÖDP					262	0.2	0.0
Nichtwahler					189	0.1	
REP					152	0.1	▼0.2
Party of Reason					130	0.1	
BIG					80	0.1	
RRP					72	0.0	▼0.1
PSG					32	0.0	0.0
MLPD					26	0.0	0.0
Die Rechte					21	0.0	
BüSo					18	0.0	0.0
Informal votes		1,983			1,953		
Total valid votes		148,916			148,946		
Turnout		150,899	72.1	▲1.0			
CDU hold	Majority	22,037	22.1	▲1.5			

=== 2009 election ===
Federal election (2009): Oberbergischer Kreis
Notes:	Blue background denotes the winner of the electorate vote. Pink background denotes a candidate elected from their party list. Yellow background denotes an electorate win by a list member, or other incumbent. A ✓ or ✗ denotes status of any incumbent, win or lose respectively.						
Party	Candidate	Votes	%	±%	Party votes	%	±%
CDU	✓ Klaus-Peter Flosbach	71,759	48.4	▼0.7	56,807	38.3	▼1.6
SPD	Michaela Engelmeier	41,165	27.8	▼10.5	35,604	24.0	▼10.2
FDP	Jörg von Polheim	12,990	8.8	▲4.6	25,007	16.8	▲4.2
Greens	Andreas Schmitz	10,066	6.8	▲3.0	12,826	8.6	▲1.9
Left	Axel Hofmann	9,599	6.5	▲2.9	11,070	7.5	▲3.0
Pirates					2,035	1.4	
NPD	Marc-Benedict Kremer	1,734	1.2	▲0.2	1,317	0.9	0.0
Tierschutzpartei					977	0.7	▲0.1
FAMILIE					905	0.6	▲0.1
RENTNER					551	0.4	
REP					380	0.3	0.0
ÖDP	Felix Johannes Staratschek	458	0.3		264	0.2	
Independent	Dirk Grabowski	449	0.3				
RRP					228	0.2	
Volksabstimmung					193	0.1	0.0
DVU					119	0.1	
Centre					79	0.1	0.0
BüSo					36	0.0	0.0
PSG					22	0.0	0.0
MLPD					16	0.0	0.0
Informal votes		2,389			2,173		
Total valid votes		148,220			148,436		
Turnout		150,609	71.1	▼6.6			
CDU hold	Majority	30,594	20.6	▲9.8			

=== 2005 election ===
Federal election (2005): Oberbergischer Kreis
Notes:	Blue background denotes the winner of the electorate vote. Pink background denotes a candidate elected from their party list. Yellow background denotes an electorate win by a list member, or other incumbent. A ✓ or ✗ denotes status of any incumbent, win or lose respectively.						
Party	Candidate	Votes	%	±%	Party votes	%	±%
CDU	✓ Klaus-Peter Flosbach	79,789	49.1	▲3.9	64,751	39.8	▼9.3
SPD	Michaela Engelmeier-Heite	62,195	38.3	▼5.2	55,537	34.2	▼4.2
FDP	Sylvia Bruns	6,743	4.2	▼1.7	18,849	11.6	▲2.3
Greens	Andreas Schmitz	6,129	3.8		10,891	6.7	▼0.4
Left	Peter Ullmann	5,736	3.5	▲2.7	7,232	4.5	▲3.5
NPD	Frank-Rainer Nissler	1,509	0.9		1,401	0.9	▲0.6
Tierschutzpartei					898	0.6	▲0.2
Familie					854	0.5	▲0.3
PBC					698	0.4	▲0.1
GRAUEN					554	0.3	▲0.2
REP					484	0.3	
Independent	Felix Staratschek	351	0.2				
From Now on... Democracy Through Referendum					149	0.1	
Centre					53	0.0	
BüSo					27	0.0	
Socialist Equality Party					82	0.1	
MLPD					38	0.0	0.0
Informal votes		2,590			2,544		
Total valid votes		162,452			162,498		
Turnout		165,042	77.6	▼3.4			
CDU hold	Majority	17,594	10.8				
