= Alexandrian World Chronicle =

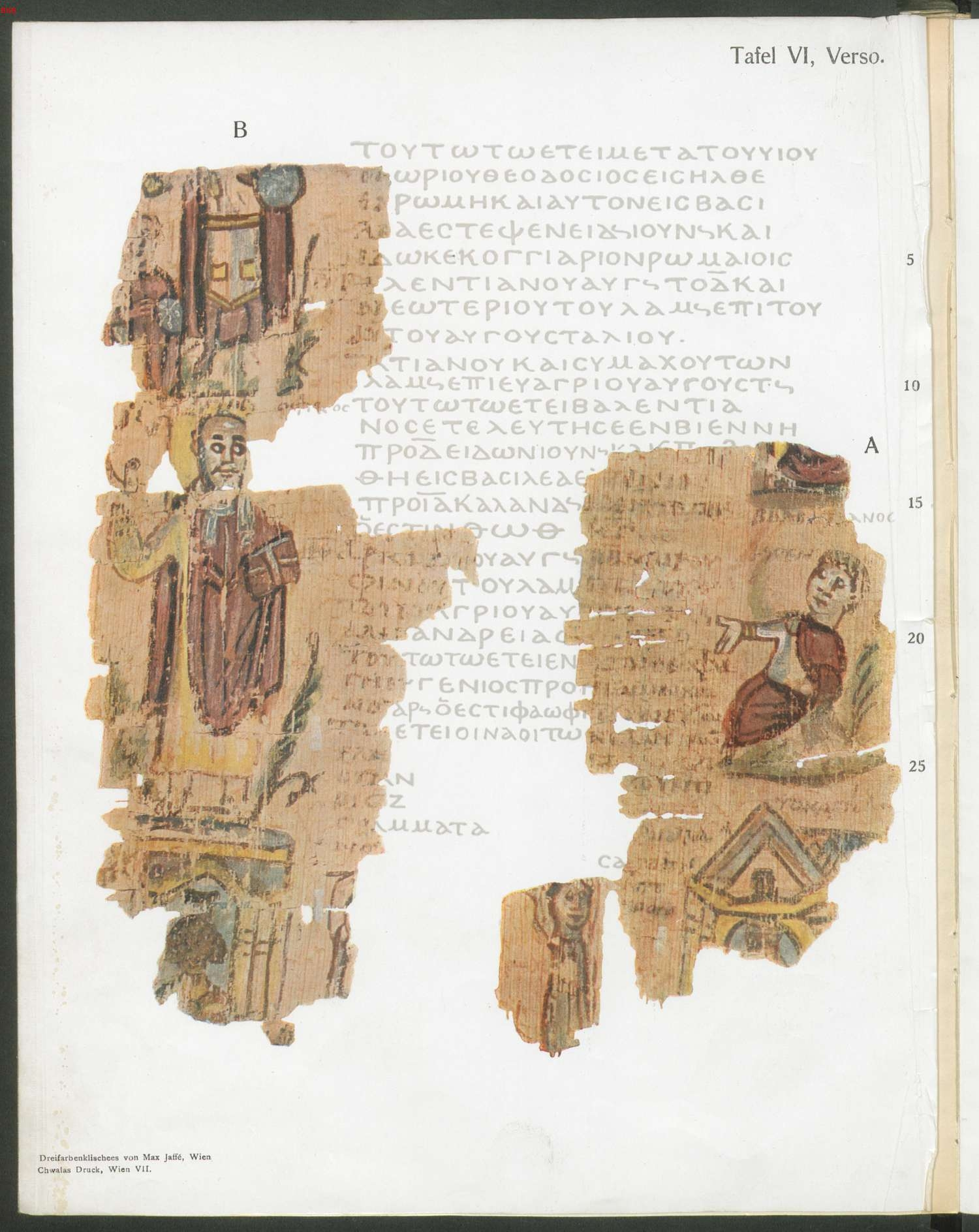
Pl. 6, Verso - Chronicle of 389–392. Top left: Emperor Theodosius with a small Honorius at his side. Middle left: Theophilus with a Gospel in his hand and a halo. Top right: Lower fragments of a figure representing Emperor Valentinian. Middle right: the counter-Emperor Eugenius. Bottom: two fragments of the Serapeum with stone-throwing monks between them.

The Alexandrian World Chronicle or Chronographia Golenischevensis is an anonymous Greek chronicle compiled in Alexandria, recording history from Creation until the year 392 AD. The chronicle survives in the fragments of a c. 6th-century papyrus named the Golenischev papyrus, well known for its examples of early historical illumination.

== Papyrus ==
The Golenischev (or Goleniščev) papyrus is a fragmentary illuminated papyrus in which the Alexandrian World Chronicle is attested. It has been dated to various periods between the 5th and 8th centuries, though the consensus now dates the text to the c. 6th-century; It has been conjectured that the papyrus belonged to a very wealthy patron, due to its lavish illustrations. It has been named after the Russian Egyptologist Vladimir Golenishchev who obtained it at some point before 1901 from one 'Sheikh Ali' in Giza.

The papyrus exists in 80 fragments of Alexandrian majuscule text currently housed at the Pushkin Museum with marginal illustrations depicting - among other figures - Roman kings, a map of the Mediterranean, Old Testament prophets and characters, and personifications of the Roman months. The best preserved fragment (Pl. VI verso) depicts Pope Theophilus atop the Serapeum and has been called an "iconic image [...] in the history of Late Antique Alexandria"; the fragment has been used by historian Johannes Hahn to date the destruction of the Serapeum to 392 AD though this date has been criticised by Adolf Bauer, R. W. Burgess and Jitse H. F. Dijkstra as having little authority.

In 1905, the Greek text of the Chronicle was published as Eine Alexandrinische Weltchronik, edited together from papyrus fragments of the Golenischev Papyrus by Josef Strzygowski and Adolf Bauer with glass plates containing colored facsimiles of the illuminated fragments (see below). The fragments were obtained from Vladimir Golenishchev and reconstructed to form images of what the text may have looked like. The fragments of the Golenischev papyrus have since been mishandled and their quality is greatly reduced from when Strzygowski and Bauer reproduced them.

== Text ==
The Excerpta Latina Barbari, a late 8th-century Latin chronicle, appears to be partly based on the Chronicle. Burgess and Dijkstra have conjectured that both texts are based on a common source composed of the c. 221 Chronographiae of Julius Africanus and the c. 205 Liber generationis.

== Gallery ==
The following plates and captions adapted from Bauer & Strzygowski 1905:

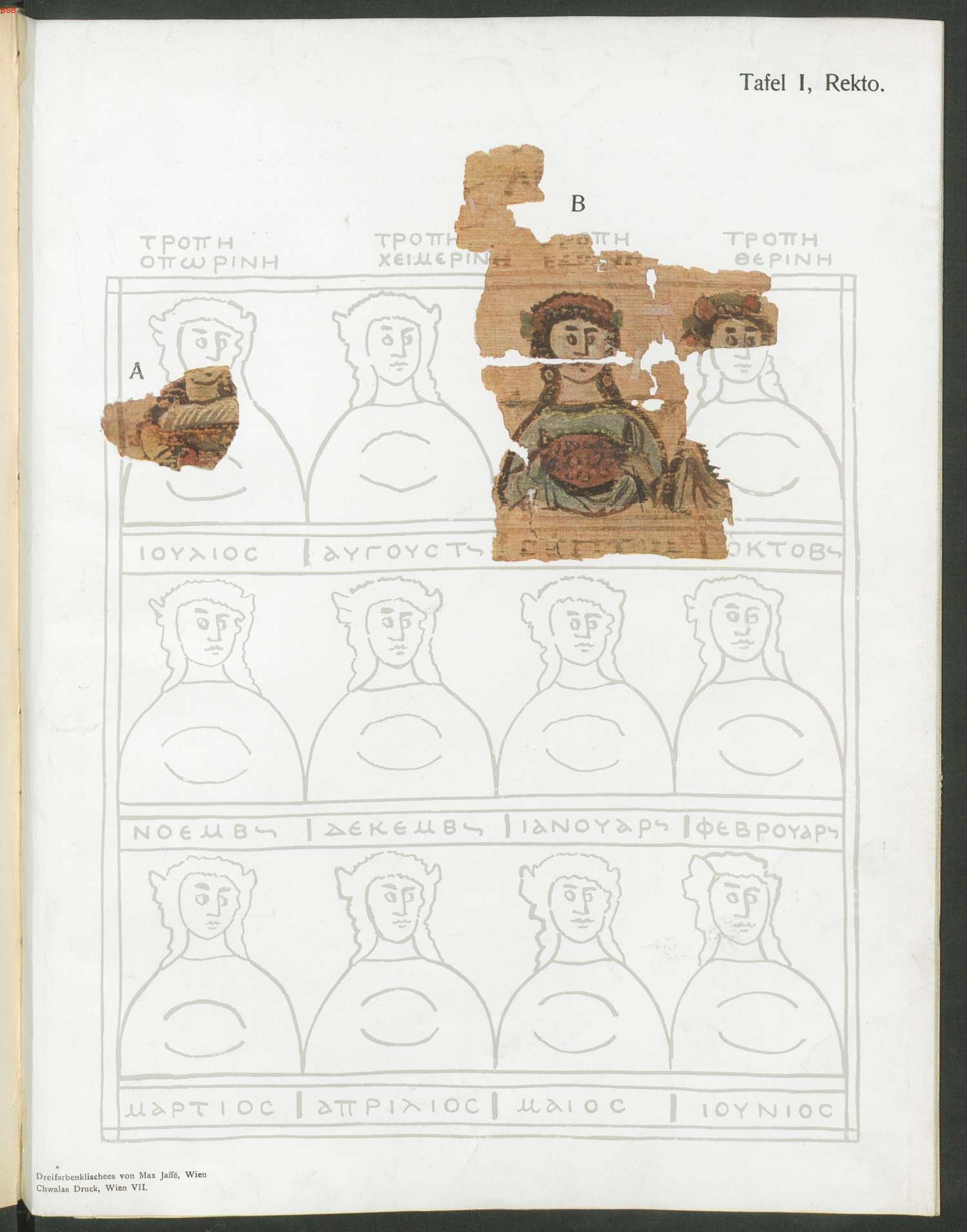
Pl. 1, Recto - Busts personifying the Roman months

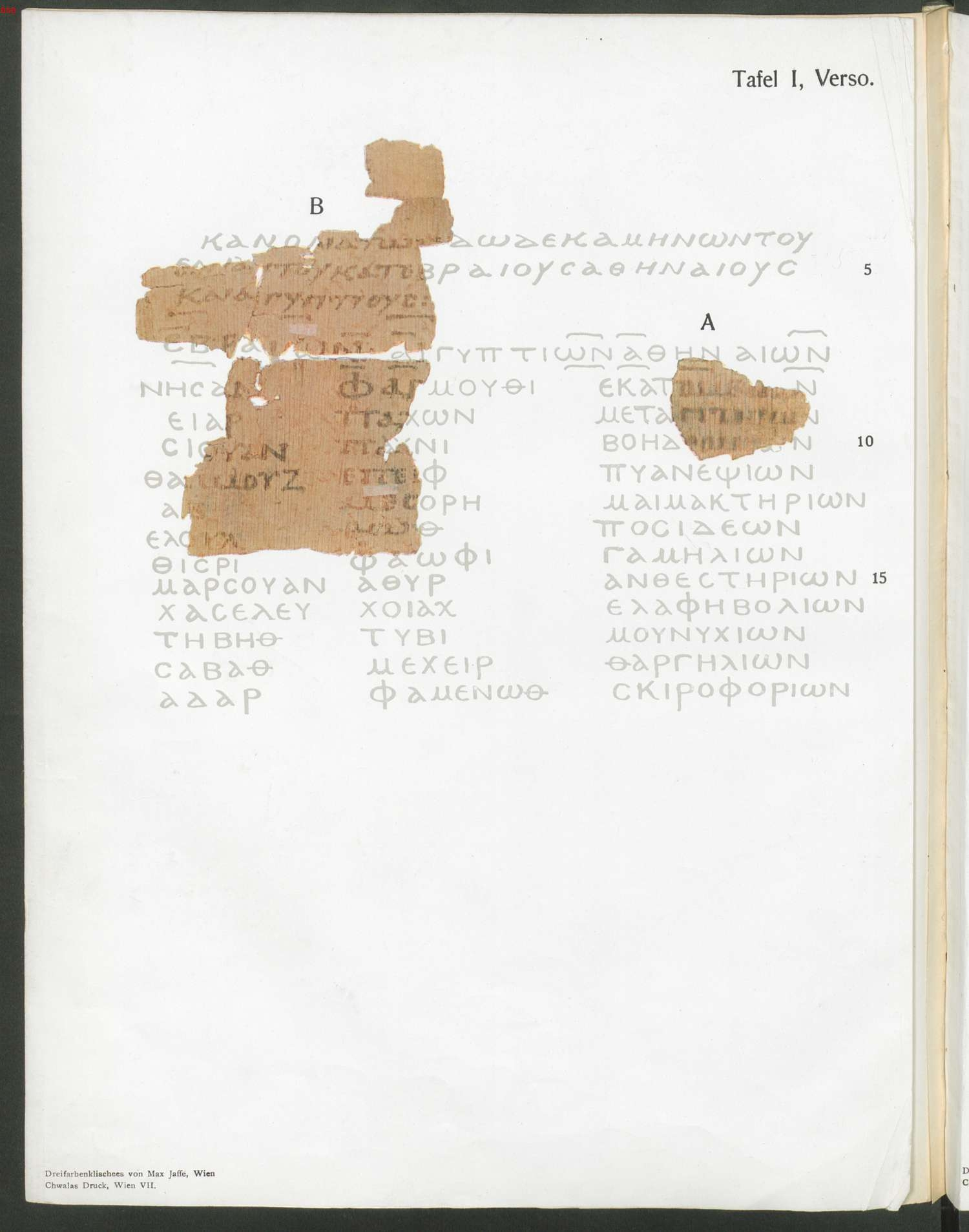
Pl. 1, Verso - Fragmentary list of Hebrew, Egyptian, and Athenian months

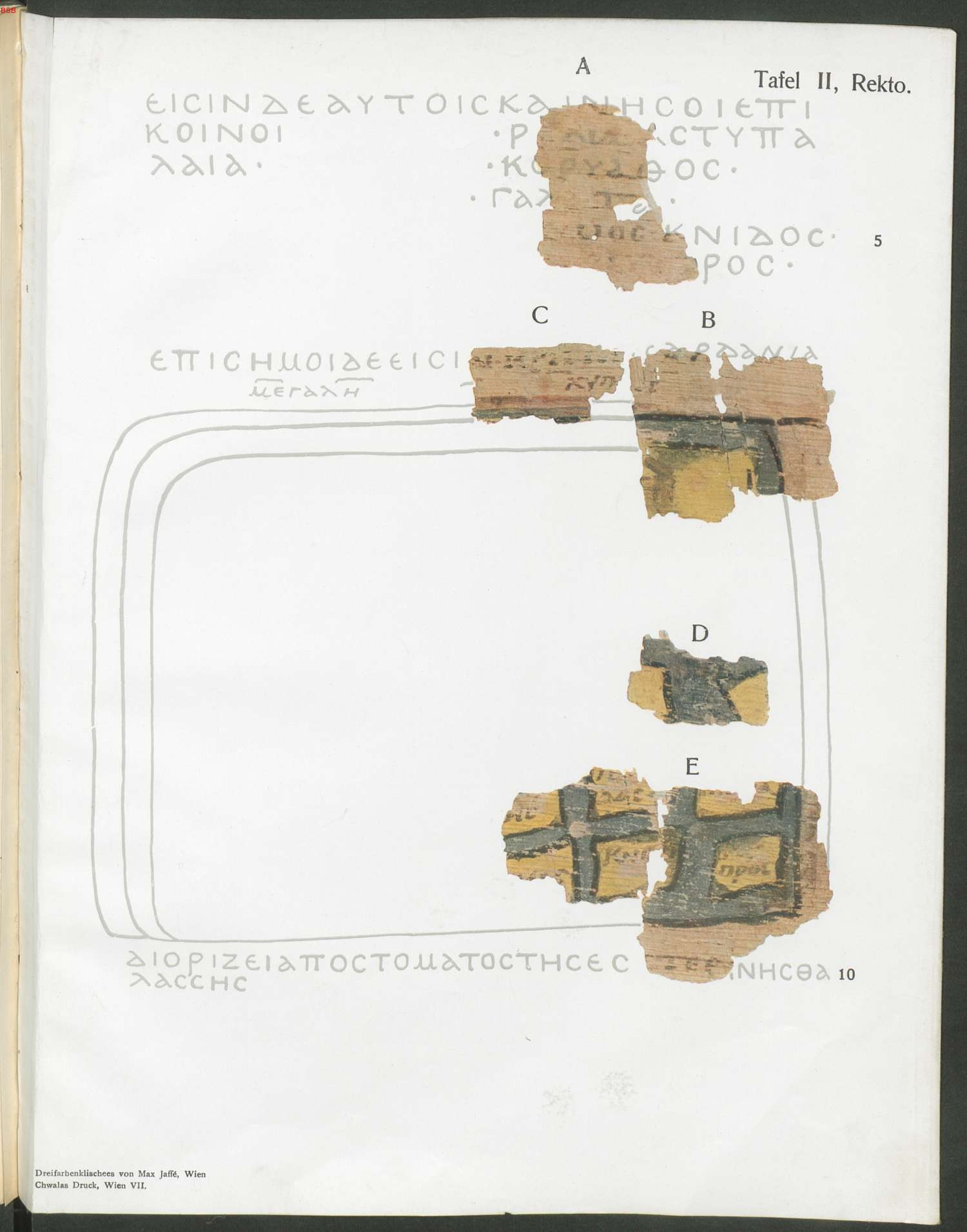
Pl. 2, Recto - Map of the Mediterranean with its islands

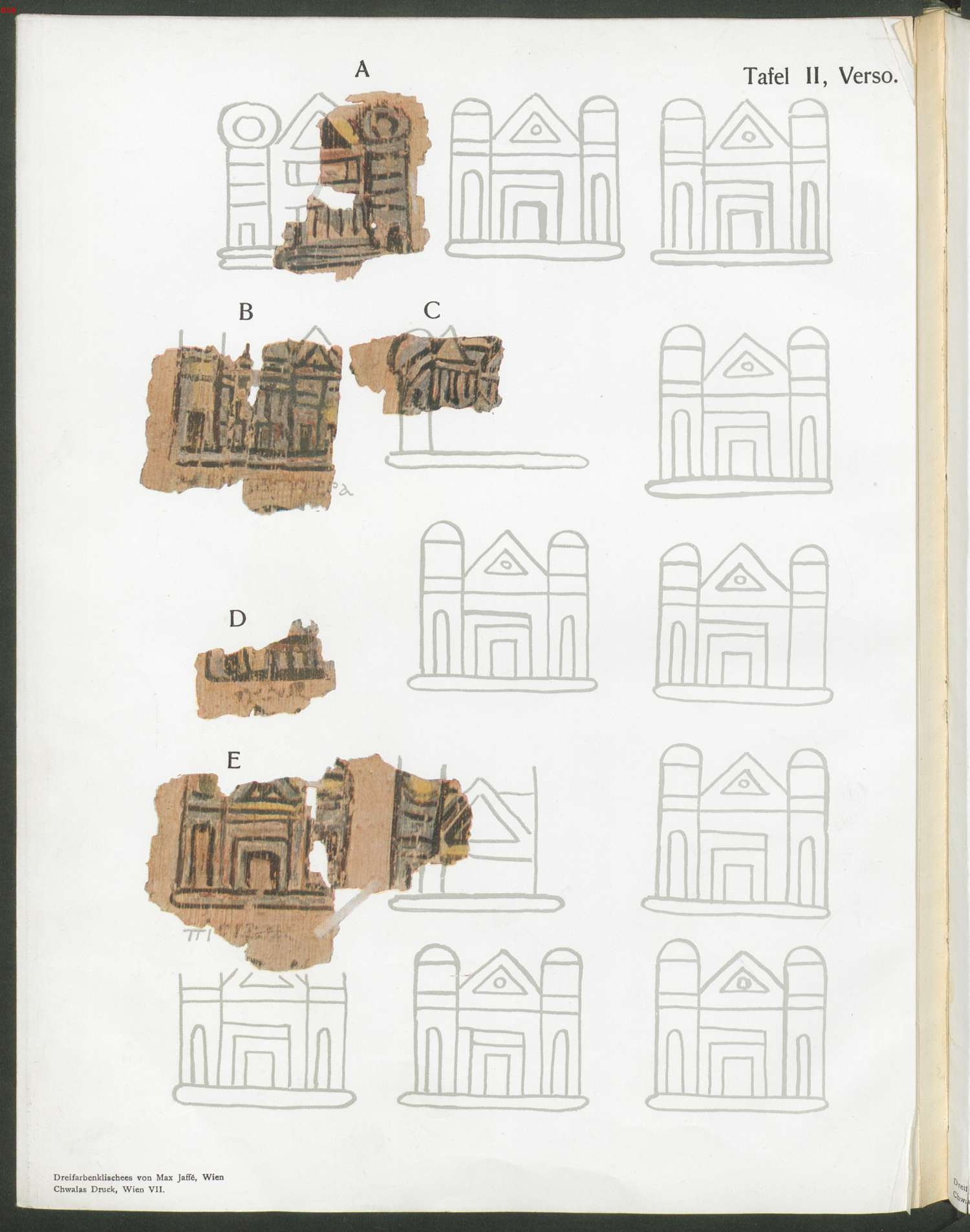
Pl. 2, Verso - Depiction of the provinces of Asia Minor

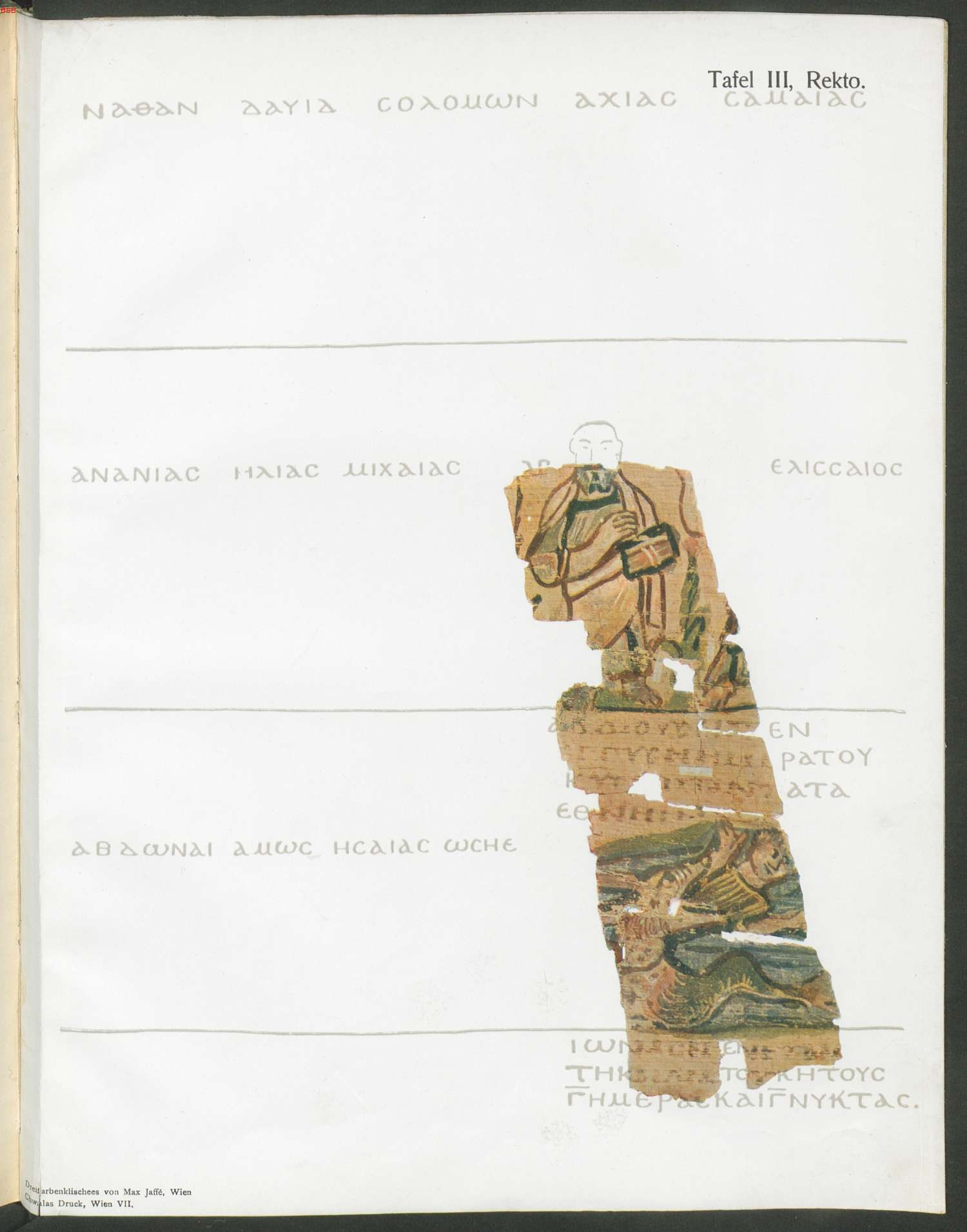
Pl. 3, Recto - Depictions of the Old Testament prophets Obadiah and Jonah

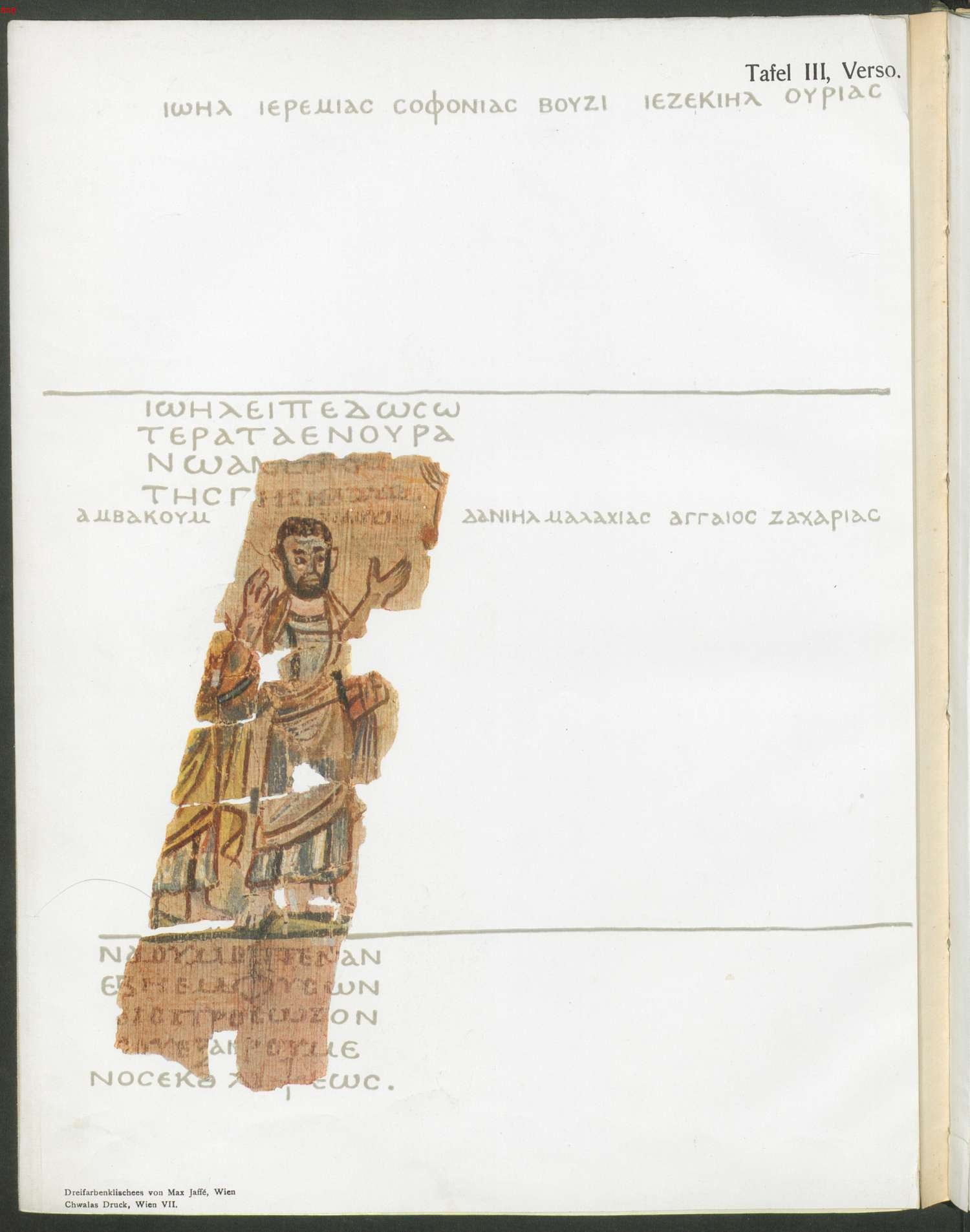
Pl. 3, Verso - Depiction of the Old Testament prophet Nahum

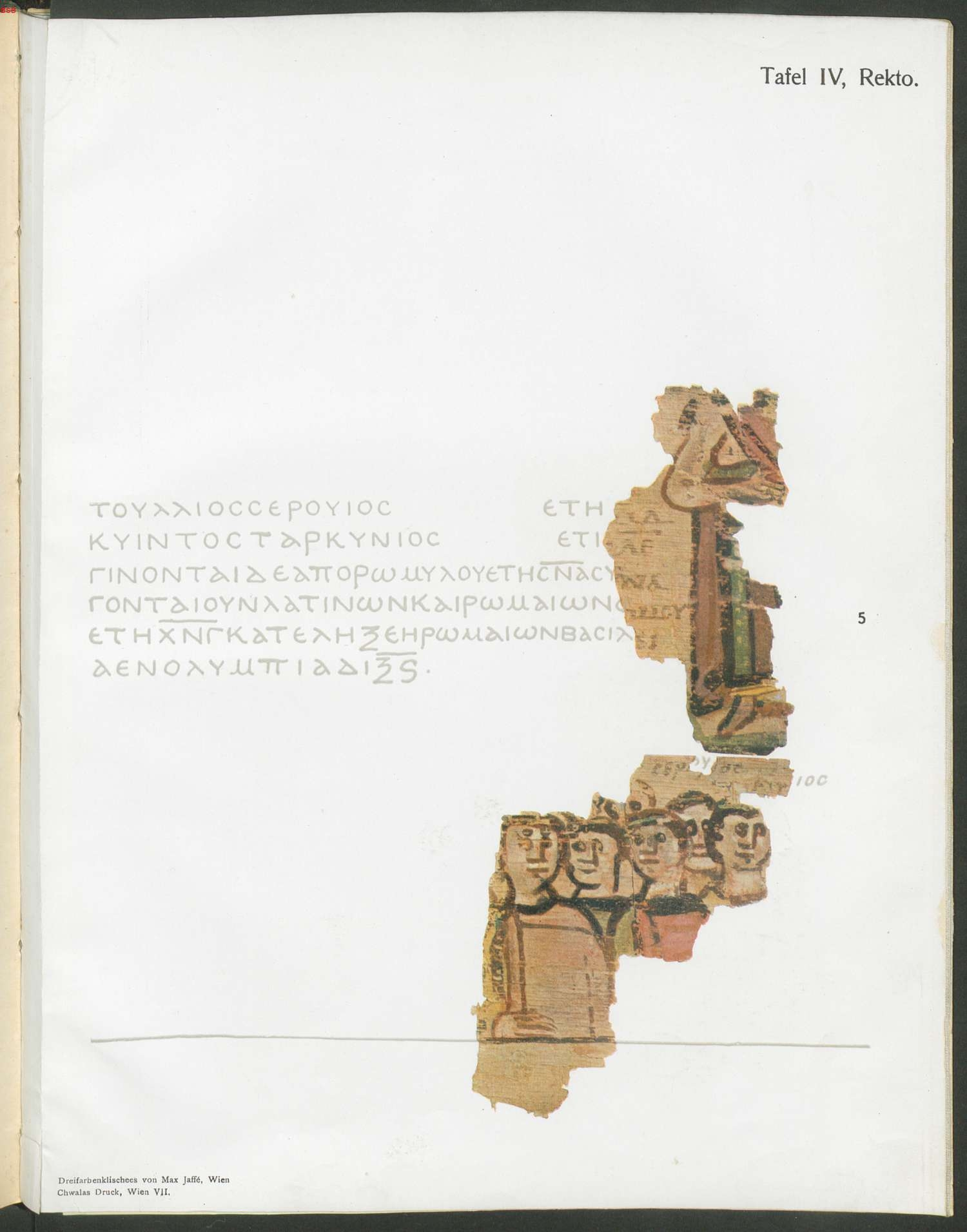
Pl. 4, Recto - Depictions of Roman kings

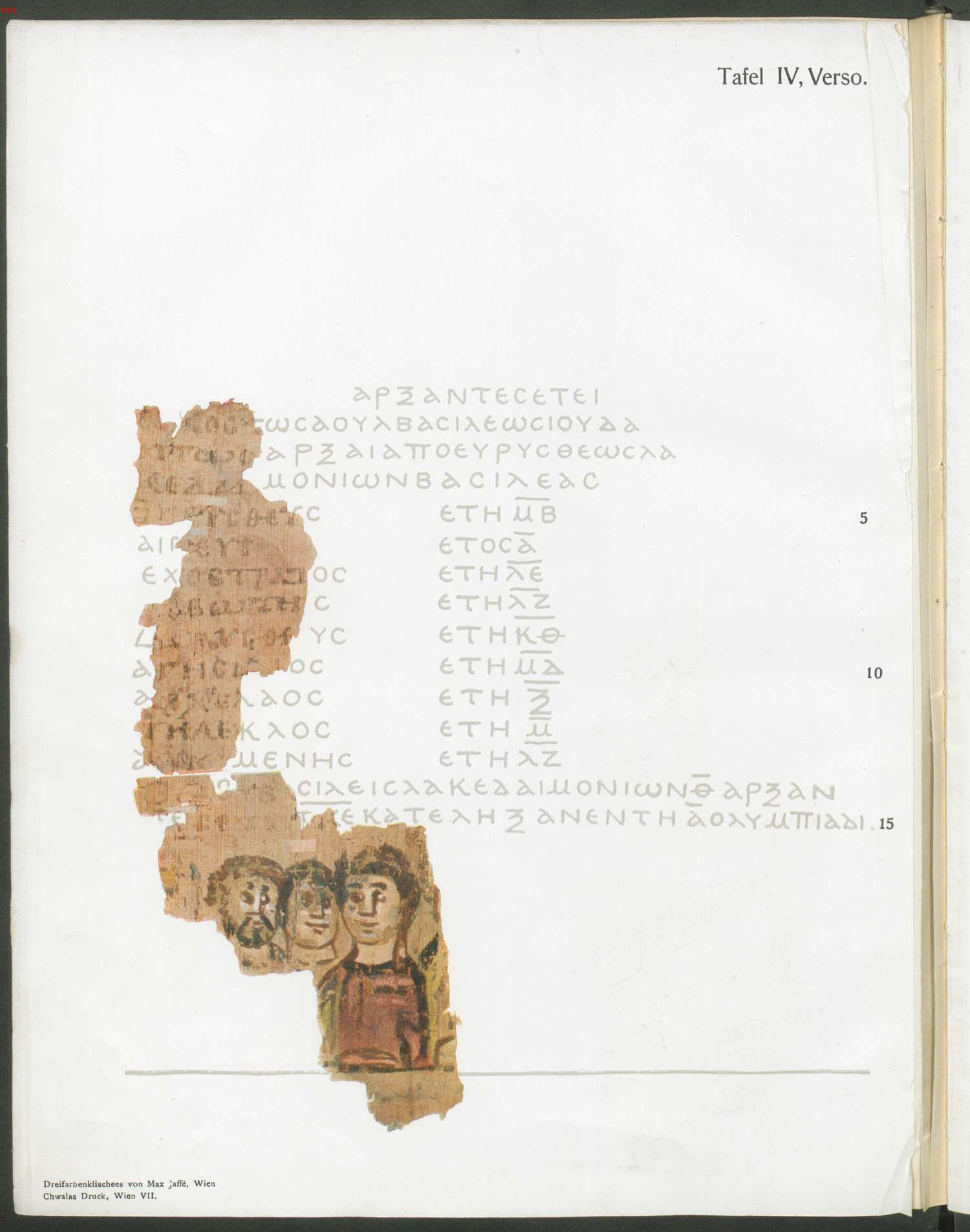
Pl. 4, Verso - Depictions of Spartan kings

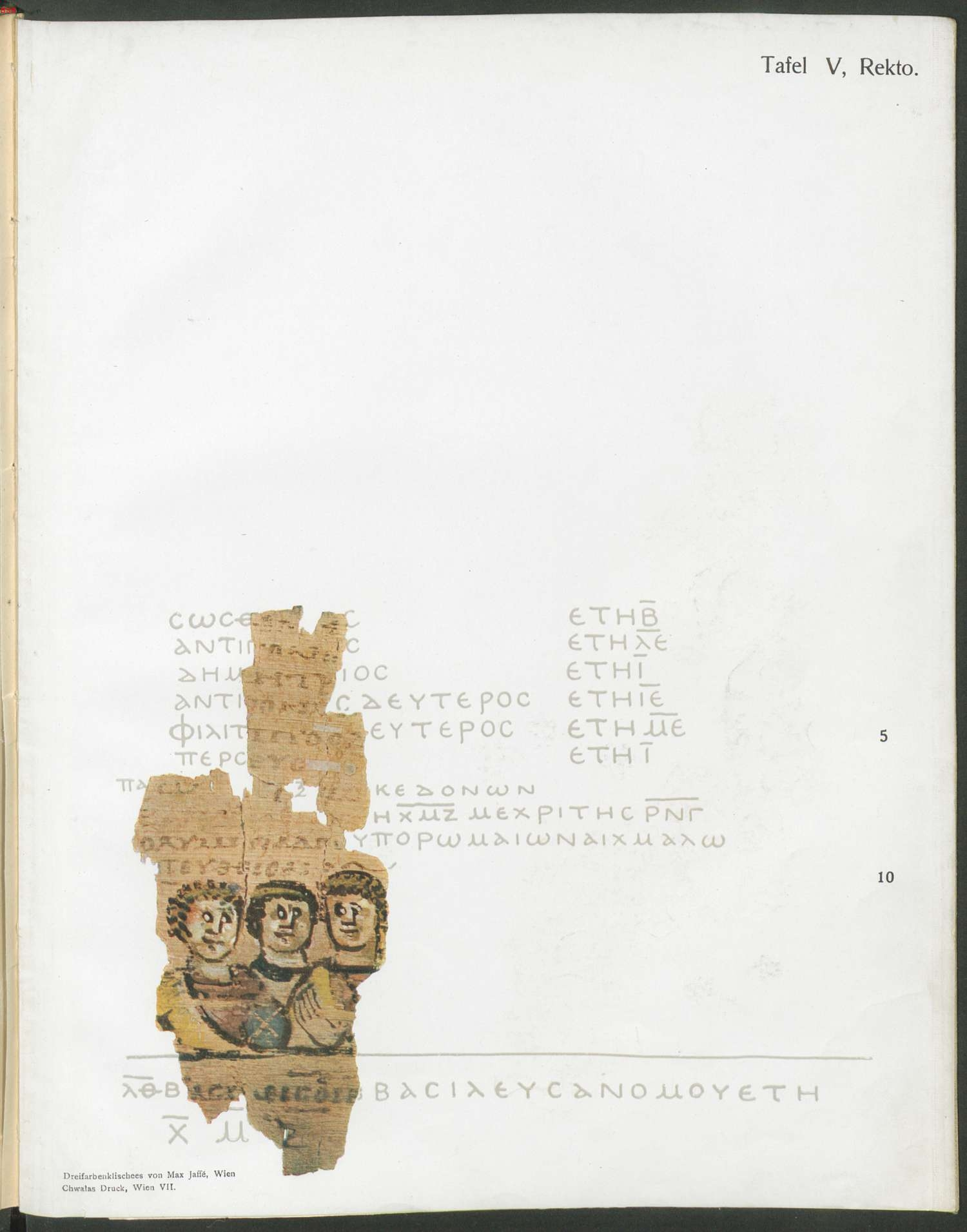
Pl. 5, Recto - Depictions of Macedonian kings

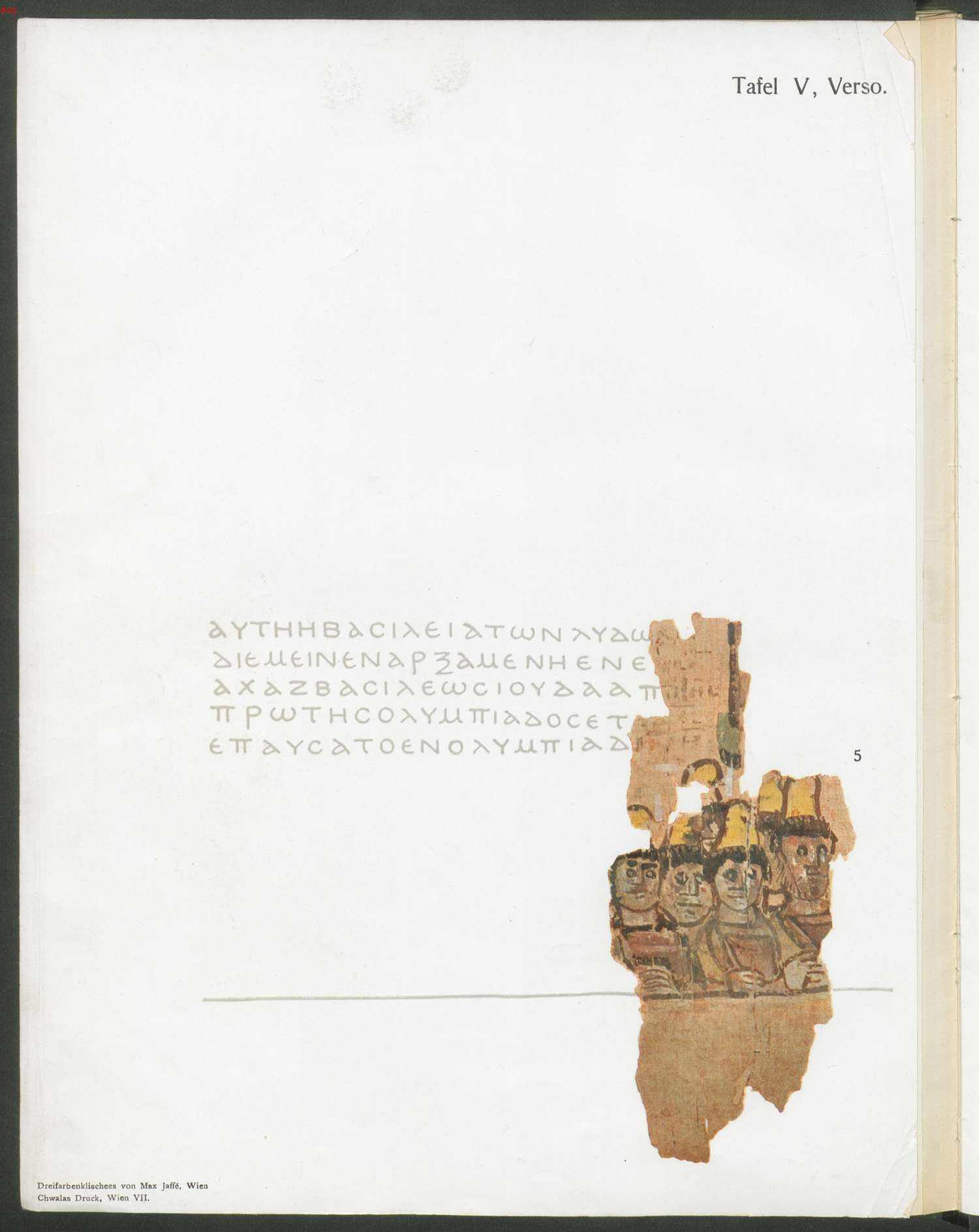
Pl. 5, Verso - Depictions of Lydian kings

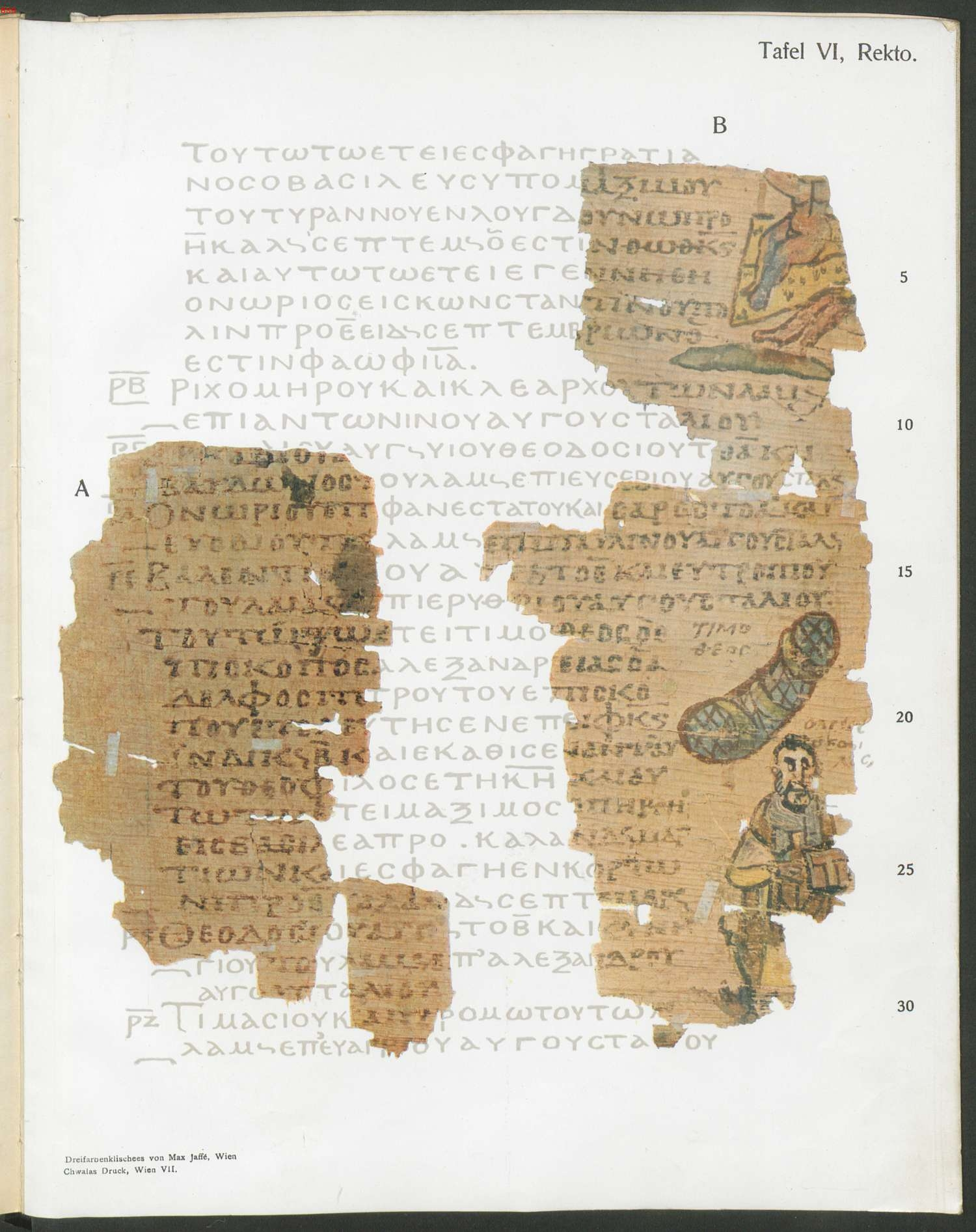
Pl. 6, Recto - Chronicle of 383-389. From top to bottom, the newborn Honorius next to the body of Maximus, the mummy of patriarch Timothy, depiction of Theophilus.

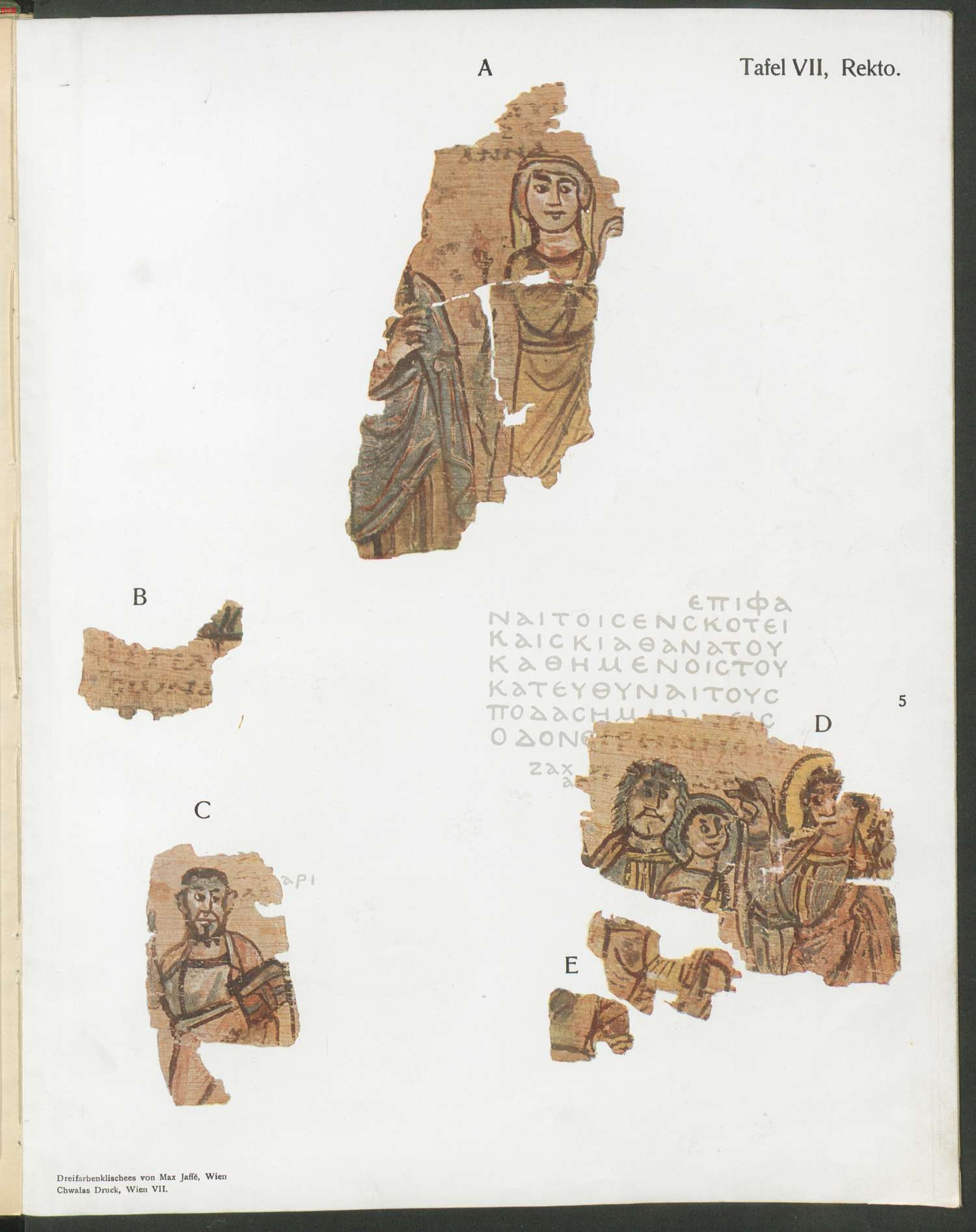
Pl. 7, Recto - A: Eli and Prophetess Anna. C: Prophet Zechariah. D+E: An angel blesses a young John in the arms of Zechariah.

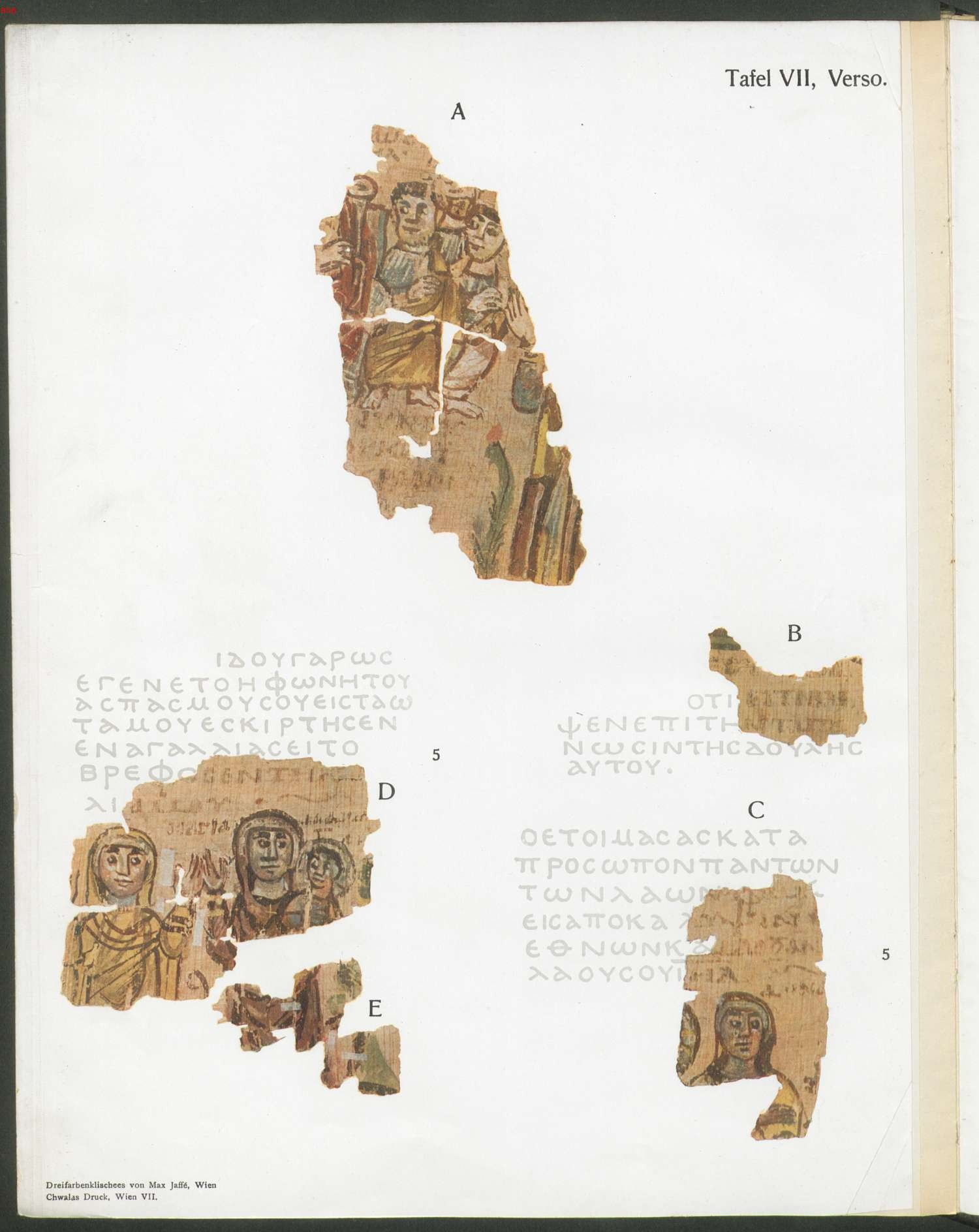
Pl. 7, Verso - A: Samuel enthroned next to David. C: Prophetess Anna. D+E: Elizabeth next to Mary with the baby Jesus.

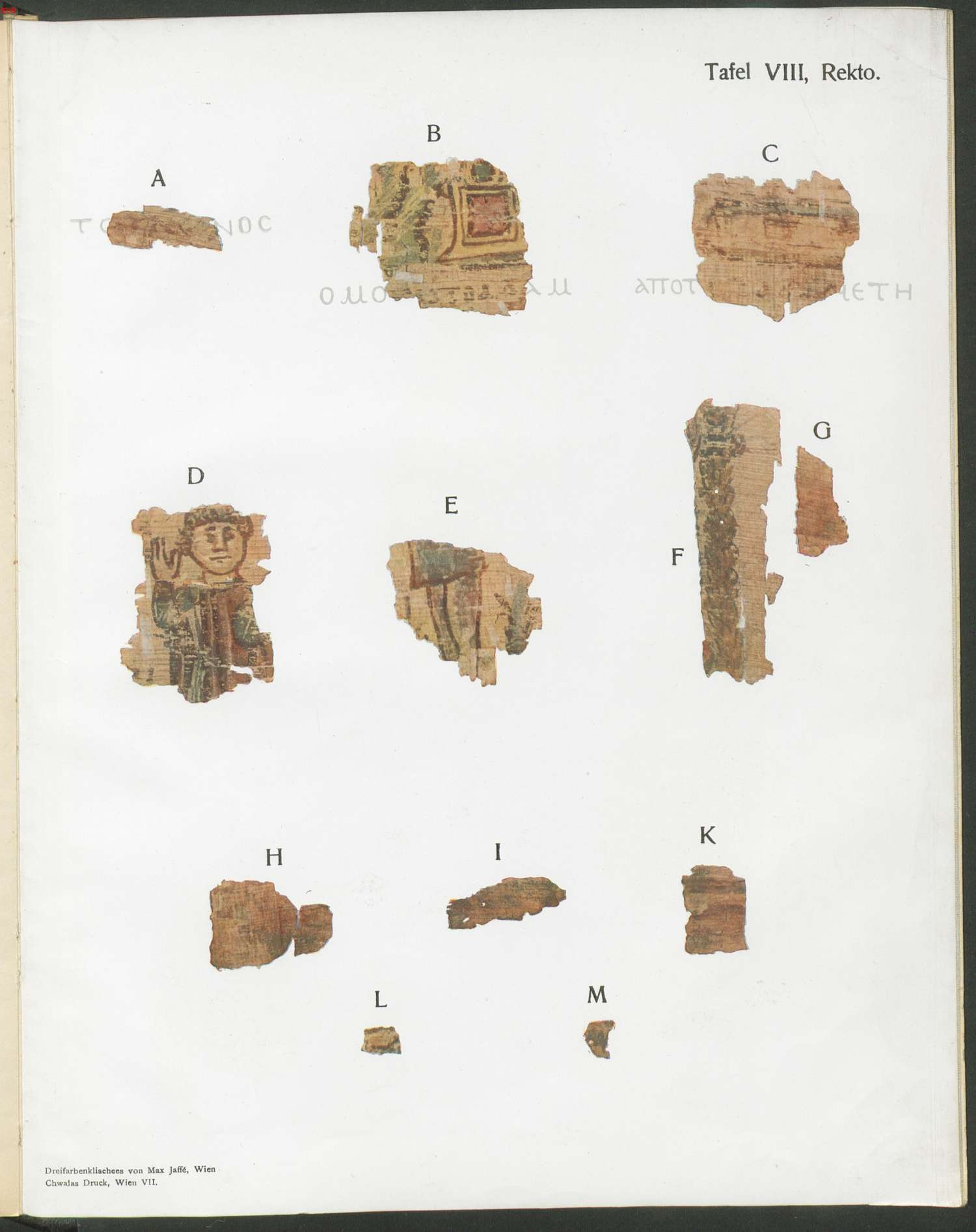
Pl. 8, Recto - A, C, H-M: Indefinite. B: An altar in the brush D: Unknown ruler. E: Undergarment of male figure. F+G: Palm tree or column.

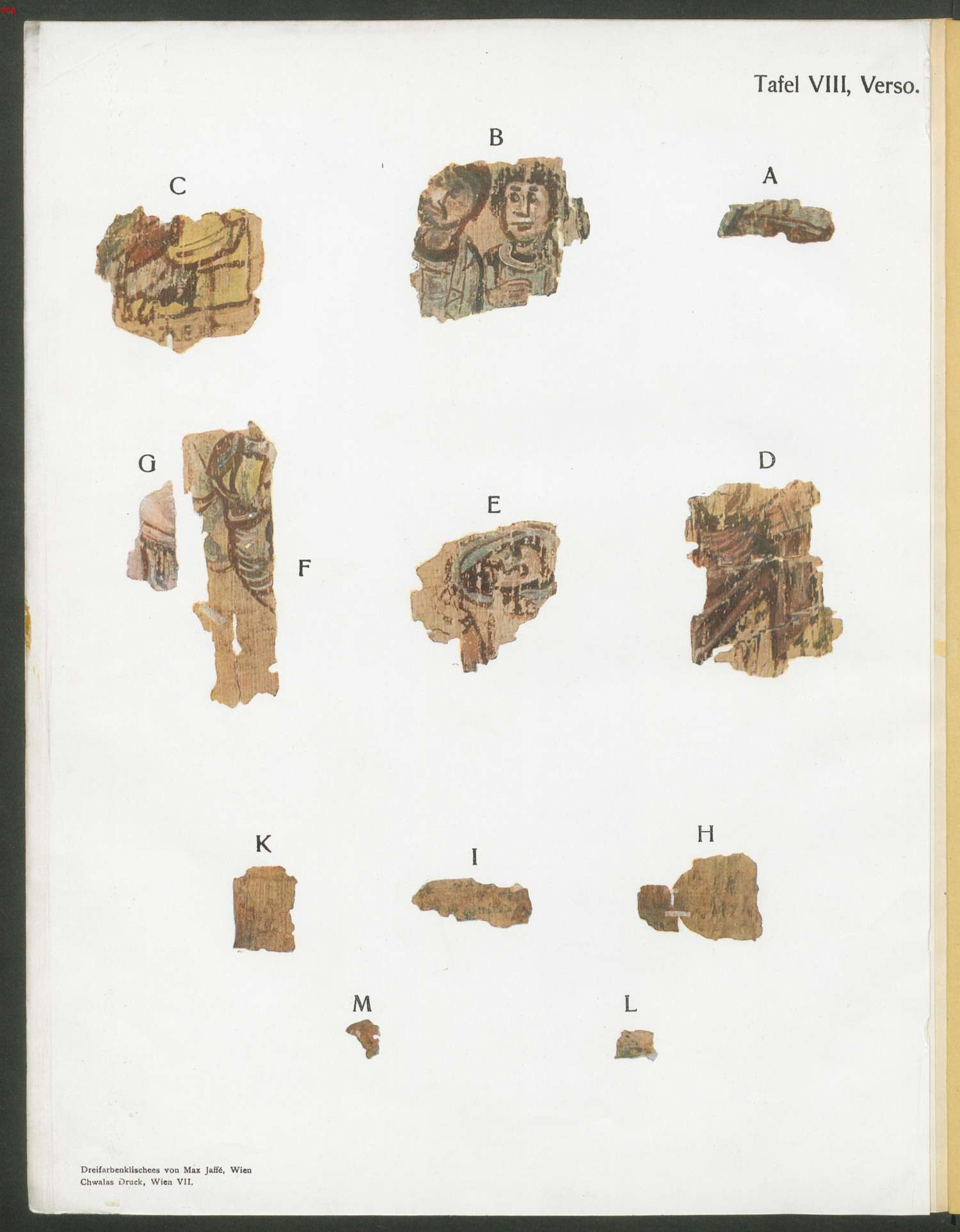
Pl. 8, Verso - A: Fragment similar to the month busts. B: Two unknown men C: Mary with Jesus in her lap D: Unknown saint E: Head of St. John. F-M: Indefinite.

== Bibliography ==
- Bauer, Adolf; Strzygowski, Josef, eds. (1905), Eine alexandrinische Weltchronik: Text und Miniaturen des griechischen Papyrus der Sammlung W. Goleniščev [An Alexandrian World Chronicle: Text and miniatures of a Greek papyrus in the collection W. Goleniščev], Vienna
- Baldwin, Barry; Cutler, Anthony (1991), "Alexandrian World Chronicle", The Oxford Dictionary of Byzantium, vol. 1, Oxford: Oxford University Press, p. 62, doi:10.1093/acref/9780195046526.001.0001, ISBN 978-0-195-04652-6
- Burgess, R. W. (2013), "The Date, Purpose, and Historical Context of the Original Greek and the Latin Translation of the So-called Excerpta Latina Barbari", Traditio, 68: 1–56, doi:10.1017/s0362152900001616
- Burgess, R. W. (2016), "Goleniščev Chronicle", Encyclopedia of the Medieval Chronicle, doi:10.1163/2213-2139_emc_SIM_01158
- Burgess, R. W.; Sparks, Nicholas (2018), "Chronographia Golenischevensis", The Oxford Dictionary of Late Antiquity, vol. 1 (1st ed.), Oxford: Oxford University Press, pp. 339–340, ISBN 978-0-19-881624-9
- Burgess, R. W.; Dijkstra, Jitse H. F. (2013), "The 'Alexandrian World Chronicle', its Consularia and the Date of the Destruction of the Serapeum (with an Appendix on the List of Praefecti Augustales)", Millennium, 10 (1): 39–114, doi:10.1515/mjb.2013.10.1.39, S2CID 143092512
- Garstad, Benjamin (2011), "Barbarian interest in the Excerpta Latina Barbari", Early Medieval Europe, 19 (1): 3–42, doi:10.1111/j.1468-0254.2010.00310.x, S2CID 161831260
- Garstad, Benjamin (2012), Apocalypse of Pseudo-Methodius. An Alexandrian World Chronicle, Dumbarton Oaks Medieval Library 14, Cambridge, MA: Harvard University Press, ISBN 978-0-674-05307-6
- Hahn, Johannes (2006), ""Vetustus error extinctus est": Wann wurde das Sarapeion von Alexandria zerstört?", Historia: Zeitschrift für Alte Geschichte, 55 (3): 368–383, JSTOR 4436822
