= Aleksandr Kotseyovsky =

Russian Egyptologist

Aleksandr Leopoldovich Kotseyovsky (Russian: Александр Леопольдович Коцейовский; 2 January 1887 – 16 January 1919) was a Russian historian, philologist and Egyptologist, specialising in the history of the ancient Egyptian religion. A pupil of Boris Turayev, he graduated from Saint Petersburg State University in 1910, having also studied in Berlin, where he attended the lectures of Adolf Erman and Georg Christian Möller. He taught at Novorossiysk University. In 1913 he published "Призывания Исиды и Нефтиды" ("Invocation of Isis and Nephthys). In 1917 he produced what is still the only Russian translation of the Pyramid Texts, which included a detailed introduction; this formed his masters' dissertation for the University of Kharkiv. He planned to produce a six volume work on the Pyramid Texts, but his death from a fever in 1919 prevented this.

== Major works ==
- Hieratic Section of Berlin Papyrus 3008: Invocation of Isis and Nephthys. Papers of the Classical Division of the Russian Archaeological Society, 1913, Vol. 7: 133–87.
- The Pyramid Texts, Odessa, 1917; Reprinted as edited by Chetverykhin, St Petersburg, Letny Sad, 2000.

== Bibliography ==
- Bibliography of Kotseyovsky and account of him (In Russian)
- Египтология // История отечественного востоковедения с середины XIX в. до 1917 г. М., 1997. pp 434–459
- Vladimir Tomsinov. A Brief History of Egyptology (2004)
