= Egyptian Collection of the Hermitage Museum =

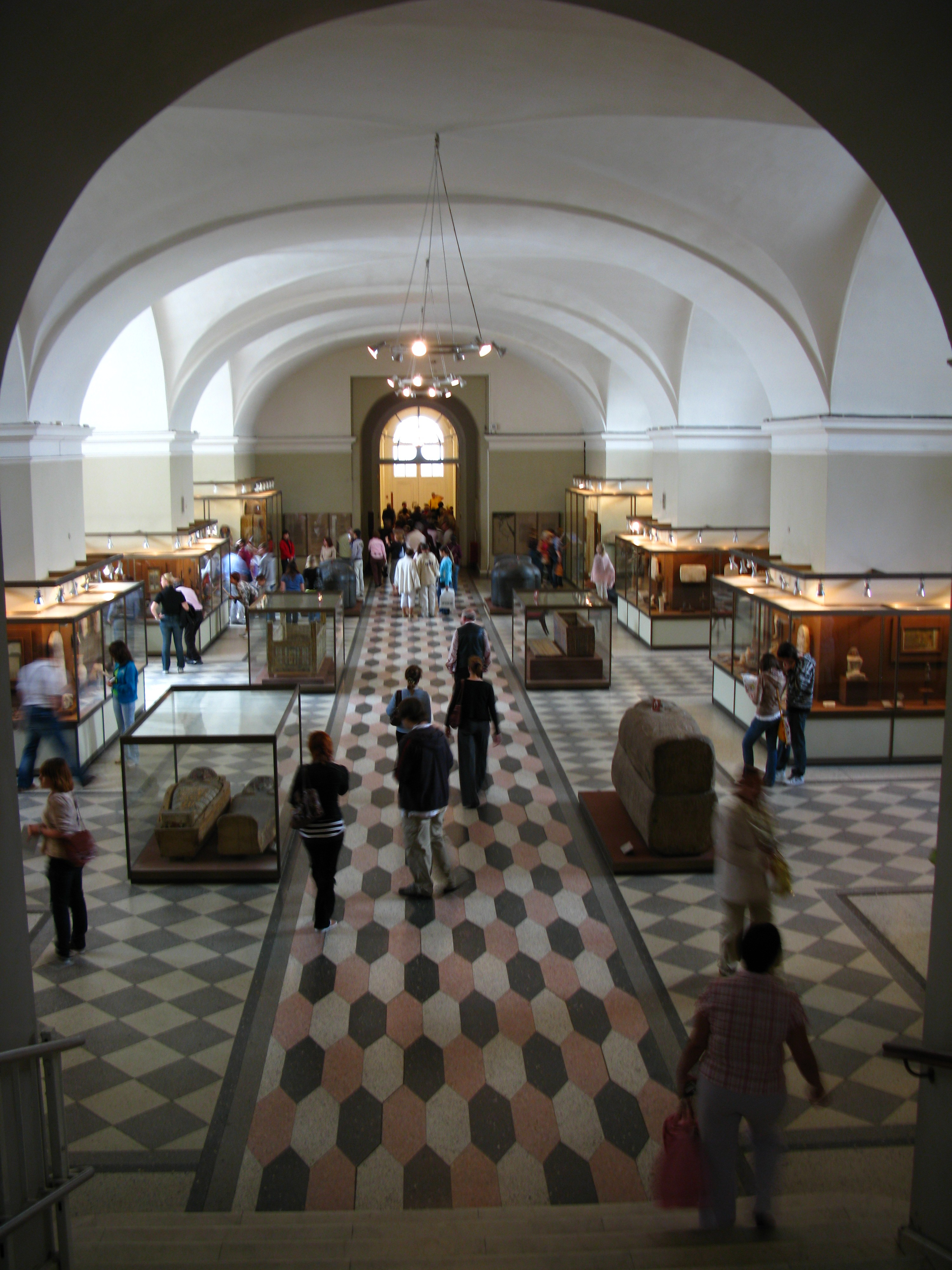

The Egyptian Collection of the Hermitage Museum dates back to 1852 and includes approximately 7,500 items from the Predynastic Period to the 12th century AD. It belongs to the Oriental Art section of the museum. The Egyptian exposition is hosted in a single large hall on the ground floor on the eastern side of the Winter Palace. The hall serves as a passage to the exhibition of Classical Antiquities in other Hermitage buildings and is situated right under St. George's Hall. It was redesigned for the exhibition by Alexander Sivkov in 1940 and earlier served as the main buffet of the Winter Palace.

== History ==
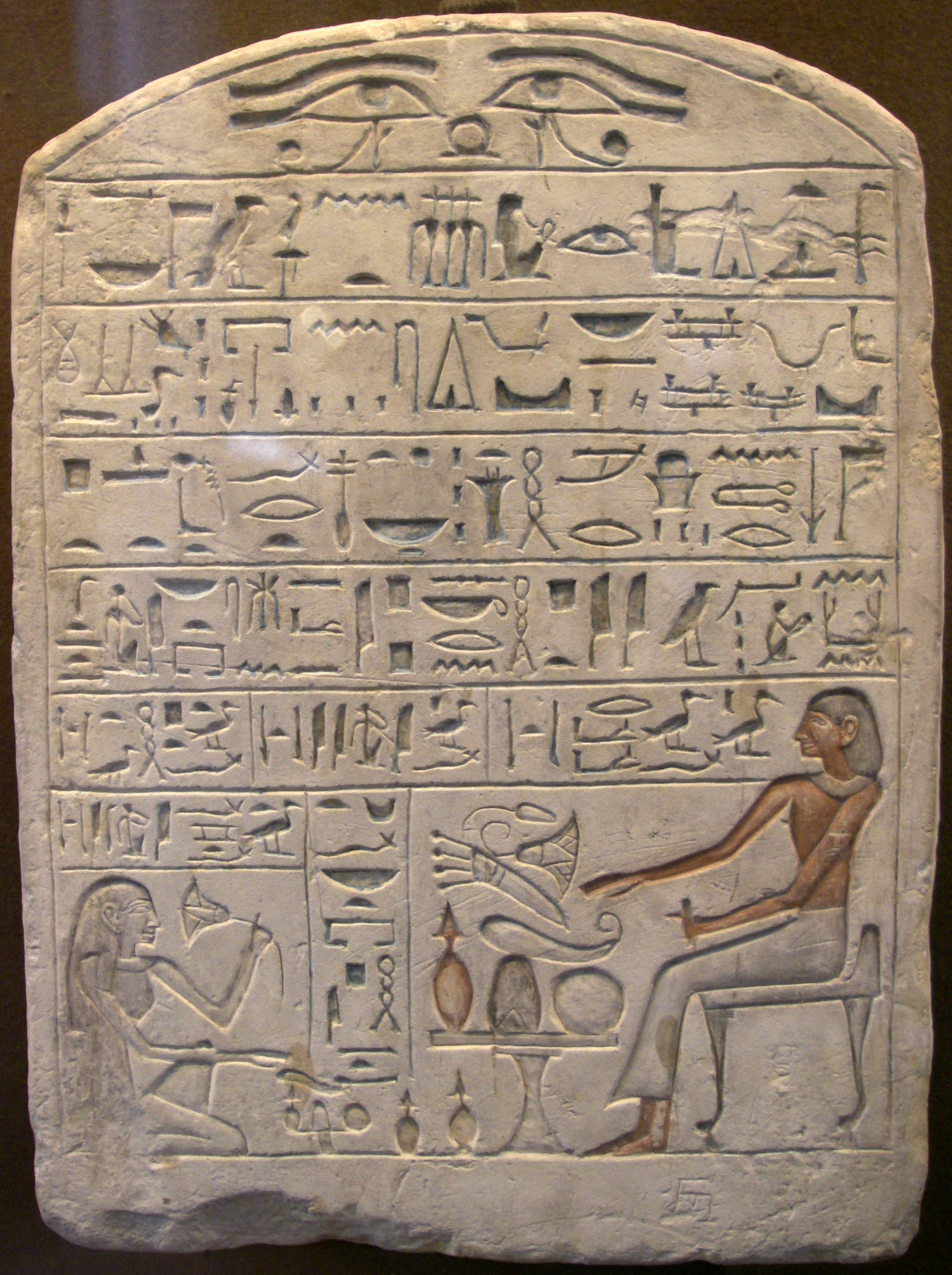
Limestone stele of a chief potter, 18th century BC

The collection was established in 1852, the year the museum was made open to the public, when it purchased the collection of statuettes from Countess Alexandra Lavalle, previously stored in her mansion on English Embankment, and received the items collected in Egypt by Maximilian, Duke of Leuchtenberg, including two black basalt sarcophagi of the Late Period, now displayed in the middle of the hall, as well as the sculpture group of Theban governor Amenemheb with his wife and mother (14th century BC). In 1853 the statue of Sekhmet (15th century BC), brought by Alexei Norov from Theban Necropolis of the Eleventh dynasty of Egypt in the 1830s, was moved from the Imperial Academy of Arts to the Hermitage. Some items were purchased for the museum from antiquities traders in Egypt and collections of Russian merchants or received as gifts.

In 1862, the collection expanded significantly, as the Castiglione collection, which was purchased by the Imperial Academy of Sciences from Carlo Ottavio Castiglione in Milan in 1826 and consisted of more than 900 items, core of the Egyptian museum of the Kunstkamera, was transferred to the Hermitage. However, there were no Egyptologists in Russia at that time. Vladimir Golenishchev became the first Russian Egyptologist and started to work in the Hermitage in the 1870s. At the insistence of Golenishchev in 1881 the remainder of the Egyptian museum of the Kunstkamera was moved to the Hermitage. The Hermitage collection continued to grow in the 1880s, when Coptic written monuments and two fragments of Egyptian water clocks were acquired. In 1891, Golenishchev published the first complete inventory of the collection. Since the 1870s Golenishchev had collected a private Egyptian collection, which was sold to the Pushkin Museum in Moscow in 1909, shortly before he emigrated. For a few years, as the building for the Moscow museum was being constructed, the items were also stored in the Hermitage. Soviet Orientalist Vasily Struve was in charge of the Hermitage's Egyptian collection from 1918 to 1933. The highlights of the exhibition include the mummy of priest Petese (10th century BC) and a fragment of a tablet of Ramesses II's Egyptian–Hittite peace treaty (13th century BC).

== Other Egyptian antiquities in Saint Petersburg ==
Other notable Egyptian antiquities in present-day Saint Petersburg include the two sphinxes of Pharaoh Amenhotep III, adorning the Quay with Sphinxes in front of the Academy of Arts Building on Universitetskaya Embankment since 1832 and egyptian collection of The Museum of the History of Religion

== See also ==
- Oscar Eduardovich Lemm
