= Adolf Bauer =

German politician (1940–2026)

President of the Sozialverband Deutschland
- In office 2003–2022

Personal details
- Born: 6 March 1940 Friesoythe, Gau Weser-Ems, Germany
- Died: 26 July 2026 (aged 86)
- Party: SPD
- Occupation: Politician, Educator
- Awards: Order of Merit of the Federal Republic of Germany

Adolf Bauer (6 March 1940 – 26 July 2026) was a German politician. He served as the President of the Sozialverband Deutschland from 2003 to 2022. He was in the Social Democratic Party of Germany.

== Life and career ==
Adolf Bauer was born in Friesoythe, Gau Weser-Ems on 6 March 1940. After training as a technician and studying engineering at the Oldenburg State Engineering Academy, he got a teaching degree at the University of Oldenburg from 1962 to 1965. He worked as a teacher in Bösel from 1965 to 1971 before serving as a primary school principal in Altjührden until 1975. He taught at a realschule in Westerstede. He was also an active member of the Gewerkschaft Erziehung und Wissenschaft trade union.

Bauer started his political career when he joined Westerstede City Council for the Social Democratic Party of Germany from 1986 to 2016 and the Ammerland District Council from 1991 to 2006. Other than his time at the council, he also held other roles on the supervisory boards of the Ammerland-Klinik Hospital and the Ammerländer Wohnungsbau enterprise.

Bauer joined the Sozialverband Deutschland in 1982. He served as the chairman from 1988 to 2018 and district chairman from 1990. He led the Lower Saxony state chapter from 2003 to 2019 and served as national SoVD President from 2013 until his resignation in 2022.

Bauer died on 26 July 2026, at the age of 86.
