= Sabine Grützmacher =

German politician (born 1986)

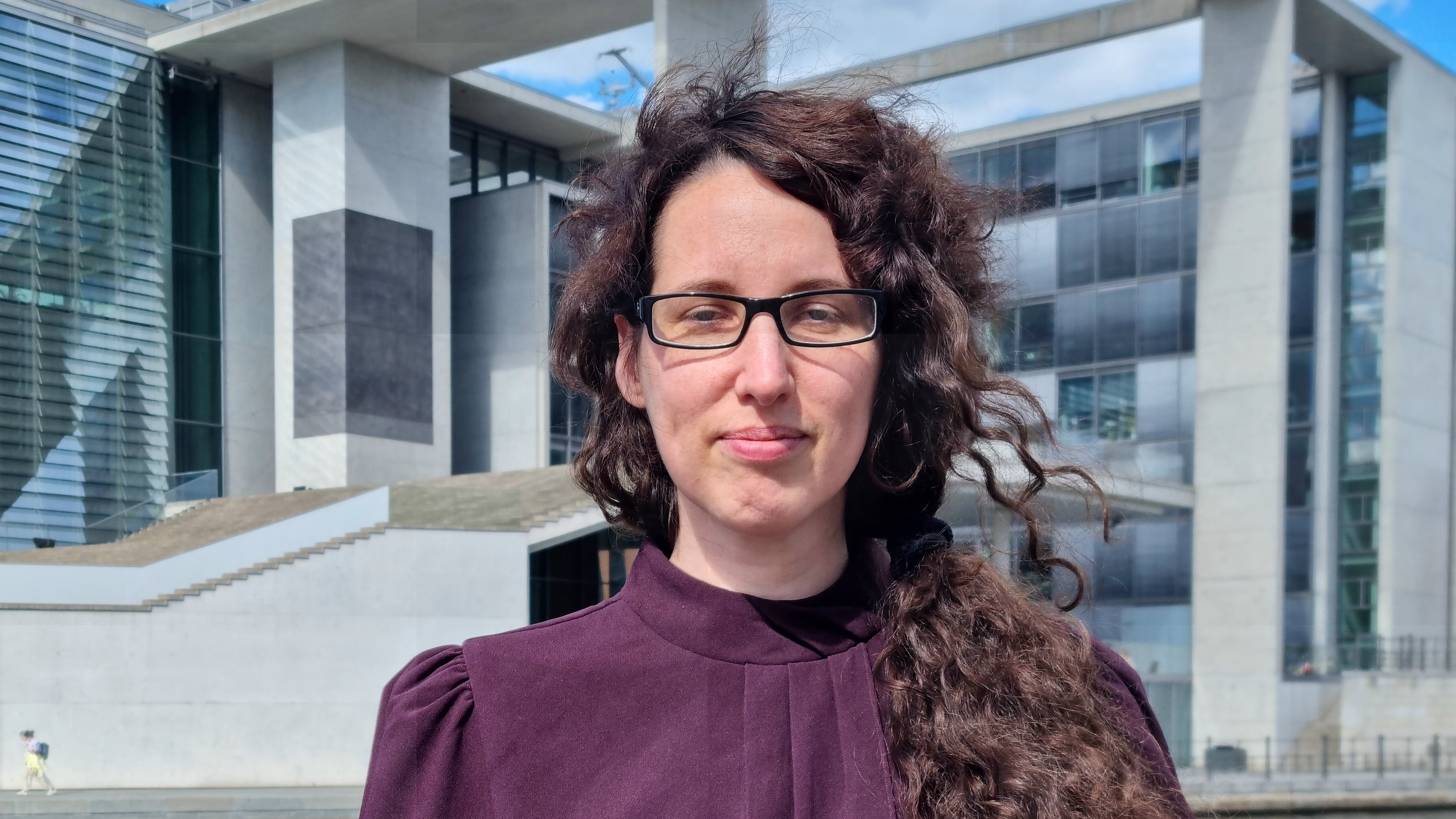
- Sabine Grützmacher, MdB, Berlin, in front of Marie-Elisabeth-Lüders-Haus, 2024-06-13

Member of the Bundestag
- Incumbent
- Assumed office 26 October 2021

Personal details
- Born: 4 January 1986 (age 40) Waldbröl, Germany
- Party: Alliance 90/The Greens

Sabine Grützmacher (born 4 January 1986 in Waldbröl) is a German politician. Grützmacher became a member of the Bundestag in the 2021 German federal election. She is affiliated with the Alliance 90/The Greens party.

== Early life ==
Sabine Grützmacher grew up in Morsbach. Grützmacher completed a degree in social work/social education and a master's degree in international comparative sociology/education in Kiel. In her master's degree, she specialised in media education/educational informatics. She is the managing director of a non-profit educational organisation.

== Political activities ==
In the 2021 Bundestag election, she ran in the Oberbergischer Kreis constituency and came third with 12.0% of the first votes, missing out on the direct mandate. She nevertheless entered the 20th German Bundestag in 25th place on the state list of Bündnis 90/Die Grünen Nordrhein-Westfalen.

== Political positions ==
In the 2021 federal election, she campaigned for "affordable housing and a funding programme for one million affordable rental flats", "fair financial and funding distribution" and "a real lobby register". She also called for "a network policy that speaks out against telecommunication surveillance of sources and provides a democratic response to digitalisation and data protection" and "a grandchildren-friendly policy that also plans for future generations, takes climate protection and equal opportunities seriously, upholds human rights and implements social justice both locally and globally".

== Memberships ==
Sabine Grützmacher is a member of the non-partisan Europa-Union Deutschland, which advocates a federal Europe and the European unification process.

== Personal life ==
Grützmacher currently lives in Gummersbach and is married. She is autistic.
