= German–Israeli Society =

German civil organization

- Deutsch-Israelische Gesellschaft
- Abbreviation: DIG
- Formation: 1966
- Founded at: Bonn, Germany
- Type: Registered association
- Headquarters: Berlin, Germany
- President: Volker Beck
- Managing director: Michaela Engelmeier
- Website: deutsch-israelische-gesellschaft.de

The German–Israeli Society (German: Deutsch-Israelische Gesellschaft (DIG); Hebrew: ʾAgudat-ha-Yedidut-Germaniah-Yisraʾel) is an organization in Germany that promotes relations with Israel.

== History ==
The Society emerged from the German-Israeli Study Groups (DIS), which had existed since 1957 at the Freie Universität and since 1960 at the Kirchliche Hochschule in West Berlin and at 17 universities in the Federal Republic of Germany. The DIS at the Church University was strongly influenced by its rector, theology professor Rolf Rendtorff. In the summer of 1963, together with like-minded people, he began to convince various members of the Bundestag in Bonn of the need to establish diplomatic relations with the State of Israel.

DIG officers have produced many of the anti-antisemitism commissioners hired by German institutions after the 2015 European migrant crisis .

In 2020, Michaela Engelmeier was appointed to the newly created office of Secretary General. The work of the DIG is to be professionalized and expanded through the new office.

== Controversies ==
Some local branches of the DIG criticized the controversial exhibition “Nakba – Flight and Expulsion of the Palestinians 1948”, which was shown in around a hundred cities. The organizers of the exhibition accused the DIG and other critics of not seeking discourse but simply wanting to stop the exhibition. However, at the opening of the exhibition in Osnabrück, even the local DIG chairman Hans-Gert Pöttering (CDU) spoke a word of welcome. The local DIG chairman Hermann Kuhn told Taz about the exhibition in Bremen that the unilateral assignment of blame made by her "is not conducive to the idea of a peaceful coexistence". The organizers of the exhibition, including Detlef Griesche from the German-Palestinian Society, accused their critics of behind-the-scenes attempts to prevent it. Griesche even claimed that the protest was "led and directed by Israel," but doesn't deny the bias: "The perspective of the Palestinians, which is otherwise suppressed, should be explicitly given a voice".

In 2019 the Berlin DIG chairman Jochen Feilcke (CDU) unsuccessfully demanded the resignation of the DIG vice president Dirk Niebel (FDP) and then resigned himself. During a business trip to Israel, Niebel made a statement that he considered undiplomatic and later retracted when he went privately to the Gaza Strip, which is controlled by the radical Islamic group Hamas. Niebel wanted to enter the territory to visit a sewage treatment plant. The Israeli authorities prevented the trip, which had not been agreed, on the grounds that Hamas would use such visits for propaganda. Niebel refrained from running again and argued that there was time, but the criticism made it easier for him to leave."

In 2025, the DIG criticized the decision of Friedrich Merz and Lars Klingbeil to stop immediately the deliveries of military equipment to Israel. DIG declared this to be a ″victory by points for Hamas″. The reaction of all political forces in Germany was absolute incomprehension.
