= Vladimir Golenishchev =

Russian Egyptologist

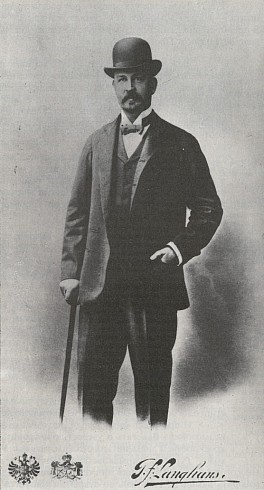
- Born: January 29, 1856; St. Petersburg
- Died: August 5, 1947 (aged 91); Nice
- Scientific career
- Fields: Egyptology

Vladimir Semyonovich Golenishchev (Russian: Владимир Семёнович Голенищев; 29 January 1856 – 5 August 1947), formerly also known as Wladimir or Woldemar Golenischeff, was one of the first and one of the most accomplished Russian Egyptologists. He was one of the founders of the Cairo School of Egyptology and one of the most recognized authorities of the schools of Assyriology and Egyptology in Russia.

== Early life and education ==
Golenishchev, the son of a well-to-do merchant was born in St. Petersburg. Golenishchev's father, Semyon Vasilyevich Golenishchev (1821–1858), owned a sizable weaving and paper-spinning enterprise on the Obvodny Canal. Additionally, Semyon had part ownership of a trading house that imported American cotton through the port of St. Petersburg. After Semyon's unexpected death, the newly widowed Sofya Gavrilovna passed the management of the businesses to a relative and spent her time raising her children Vladimir and Nadezhda. From these transactions, Golenishchev inherited capital and significant real estate in St. Petersburg. Golenishchev also received an adequate home education where he found interest in oriental studies, particularly in Egyptology. Golenishchev graduated from the 1st St. Petersburg Gymnasium in 1875 and continued his education at Saint Petersburg University from 1875 to 1879. However, at that time, the institution provided minimal resources for the study of Egyptology. The mostly self-taught Egyptologist found his first ancient Egyptian monument at the age of 14 and published his first article about papyrus in 1874 at the age of eighteen. In addition to his study of Egyptology, Golenishchev became proficient in more than a dozen languages including Russian, French, German, and English.

== Egyptological career ==
In 1884–85 he organized and financed excavations in Wadi Hammamat, followed by the research at Tell el-Maskhuta in 1888–89. In the course of the following two decades, he traveled to Egypt more than sixty times and brought back an enormous collection of more than 6,000 ancient Egyptian antiquities, including such priceless relics as the Moscow Mathematical Papyrus, the Story of Wenamun, the Alexandrian World Chronicle, and various Fayum portraits, the Teaching of King Merikare, and the Prophecy of the Priest Nefer-rehu. The most well-known document he discovered was the Tale of the Shipwrecked Sailor. He also published the so-called Hermitage papyri, including the Prophecy of Neferti, now stored in the Hermitage Museum.

Golenishchev created a firm foundation for Russian Egyptology and paved the way for future Egyptologists. Golenishchev had many pupils in the time he spent at the University of Cairo. One notable student, Boris Alexandrovitch Turaev, learned much from Golenishchev and went on to train the next generation of Russian Egyptologists. Alexandrovitch Turaev also persuaded Golenishchev to sell his collection of Egyptian statuary to the Moscow Museum of Fine Arts.

== Contributions to hieroglyphic decipherment ==
In 1874, Golenischev published his first article and in 1877 he published valuable work on Metternich Stela. Additionally, he made crucial contributions to the study of cuneiform, publishing Vingt-quatre tablettes cappadociennes in 1891. He was also employed by the Egyptian Museum in Cairo, where he cataloged hieratic papyri.

In 1890, Golenishchev purchased a trove of papyri from a dealer that had been deliberately torn apart and sold in pieces and reconstructed them in Cairo. These papyri are invaluable for language studies and include the Story of Wenamun, recounting the tribulations and humiliations of an Egyptian emissary to Byblos in the New Kingdom's degraded, waning days. Later, this work included a word list that became known as the Golenischeff Onomasticon.

Gradually, Golenishchev's financial situation declined and led to the auctioning of his abundant collection. Golenishchev received offers from many foreign museums. Golenishchev, acting patriotically, sold his collection to the Moscow Museum of Fine Arts in 1909. Following the sale of his collection, Golenishchev settled in Egypt. Following the Russian Revolution of 1917, he never returned to Russia, residing in Nice and Cairo. In Egypt, he established and held the chair in Egyptology at the University of Cairo from 1924 to 1929.

== Legacy ==
In 1947, Golenishchev died in Nice at the age of 91. In 2006 on the 150th anniversary of his birth, a monument was erected for Golenishchev at the Cairo Egyptian Museum, adding him to the memorial of some of the great Egyptologists of the world. His papers are held at the Pushkin Museum, at the Centre Wladimir Golenischeff in Paris, France, and also at the Griffith Institute in Oxford, England. Golenishchev remains considered the first and most accomplished Russian Egyptologist and is revered for his dedicated work restoring, cataloging, and researching ancient Egyptian monuments.

== See also ==
- Egyptian Collection of the Hermitage Museum
- Oscar Eduardovich Lemm
- Boris Turayev
