= August Dresbach =

German politician (1894–1968)

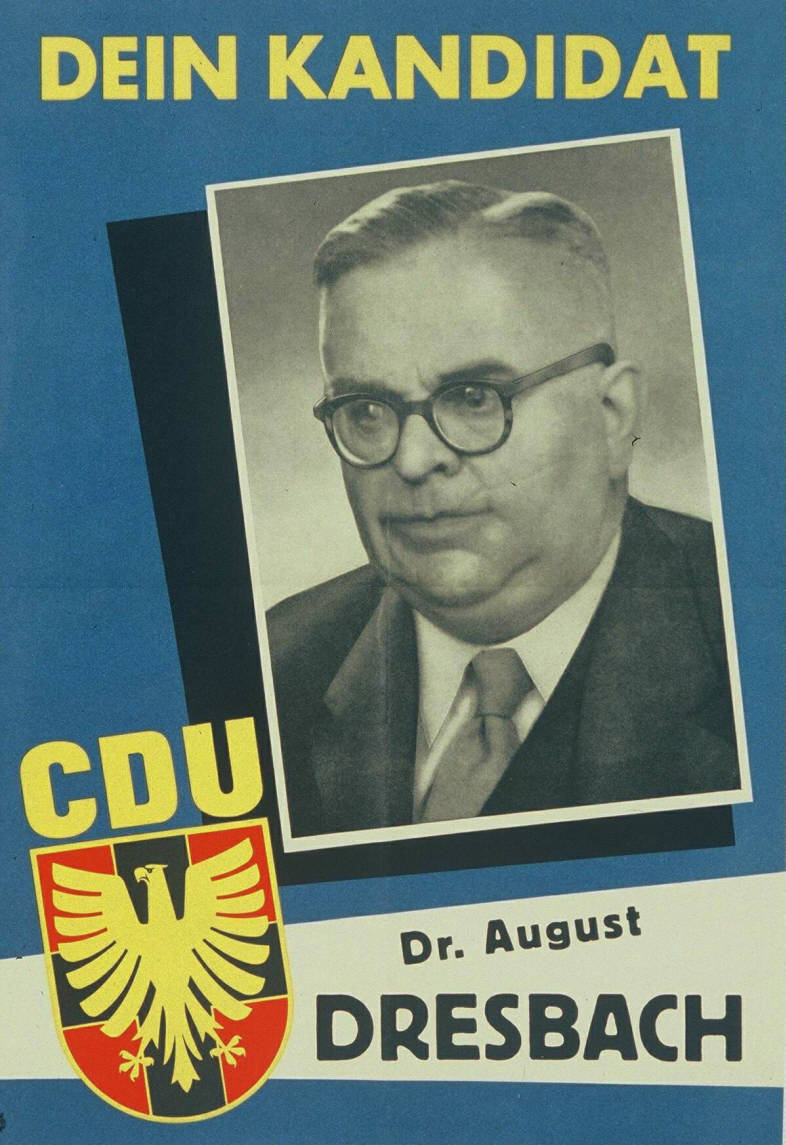
- August Dresbach's candidate poster for the 1953 federal elections

Member of the Bundestag
- In office 7 September 1949 – 17 October 1965

Personal details
- Born: 13 November 1894 Pergenroth
- Died: 4 October 1968 (aged 73) Ründeroth, North Rhine-Westphalia, Germany
- Party: CDU

August Dresbach (13 November 1894 – 4 October 1968) was a German politician of the Christian Democratic Union (CDU) and former member of the German Bundestag.

== Life ==
Dresbach was a member of the state parliament of North Rhine-Westphalia from 1946 to 1947. He had been a member of the German Bundestag since the first election in 1949 to 1965, where he represented the Oberbergischer Kreis constituency as a member of parliament who was always directly elected. From December 1950 to October 1951, he was deputy chairman of the Bundestag Committee for Internal Administration Affairs.

== Literature ==
Herbst, Ludolf; Jahn, Bruno (2002). Vierhaus, Rudolf (ed.). Biographisches Handbuch der Mitglieder des Deutschen Bundestages. 1949–2002 [Biographical Handbook of the Members of the German Bundestag. 1949–2002] (in German). München: De Gruyter - De Gruyter Saur. p. 1715. ISBN 978-3-11-184511-1.
