= Boris Turayev =

Russian historian

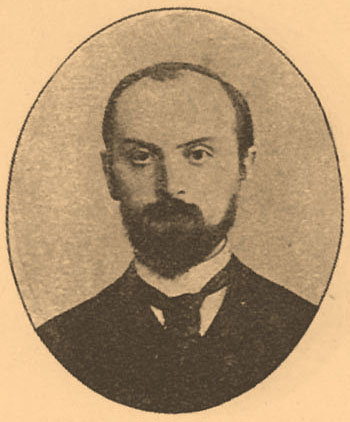
- Born: Boris Alexandrovich Turayev; 24 July [O.S. 12 July] 1868; Novogrudok, Grodno Governorate, Russian Empire
- Died: 23 July 1920 (aged 51); Petrograd, Russian SFSR, Soviet Union

Academic background
- Education: University of St Petersburg

Academic work
- Discipline: Ancient Near East studies

Boris Alexandrovich Turayev (Russian: Бори́с Алекса́ндрович Тура́ев; 5 August [O.S. 24 July] 1868 – 23 July 1920) was a Russian scholar who studied the Ancient Near East (mainly Ancient Egypt and Nubia). He was admitted into the Russian Academy of Sciences in 1918.

After graduating from the University of St Petersburg (1891) Turayev studied under Gaston Maspero and Adolf Erman and worked in museums of Berlin, Paris and London. Since 1896, he delivered lectures at the University of St Petersburg. He was an ordinary professor of this university since 1911. After the establishment of the Moscow Museum of Fine Arts, Turayev persuaded Vladimir Golenishchev to sell his collection of ancient Egyptian statuary and curiosities to the museum. For a time he lived in the museum building, preparing the collection for exhibition. His own collection of Egyptian antiquities went to the State Hermitage.

Boris Turayev's magnum opus, History of Ancient East (1911, 2 volumes), quite unprecedented in its scope, brought him recognition throughout Europe. It was the first comprehensive study that analyzed the whole history and culture of the Ancient Middle East (that was determined by Turayev as a territory from Central Asia and Iran in the East to Carthage in the West). He also wrote books about Egyptian literature and mythology (God Thoth, 1898; Egyptian Literature, 1920).
