= Carlo Ottavio, Count Castiglione =

Italian philologist and numismatist

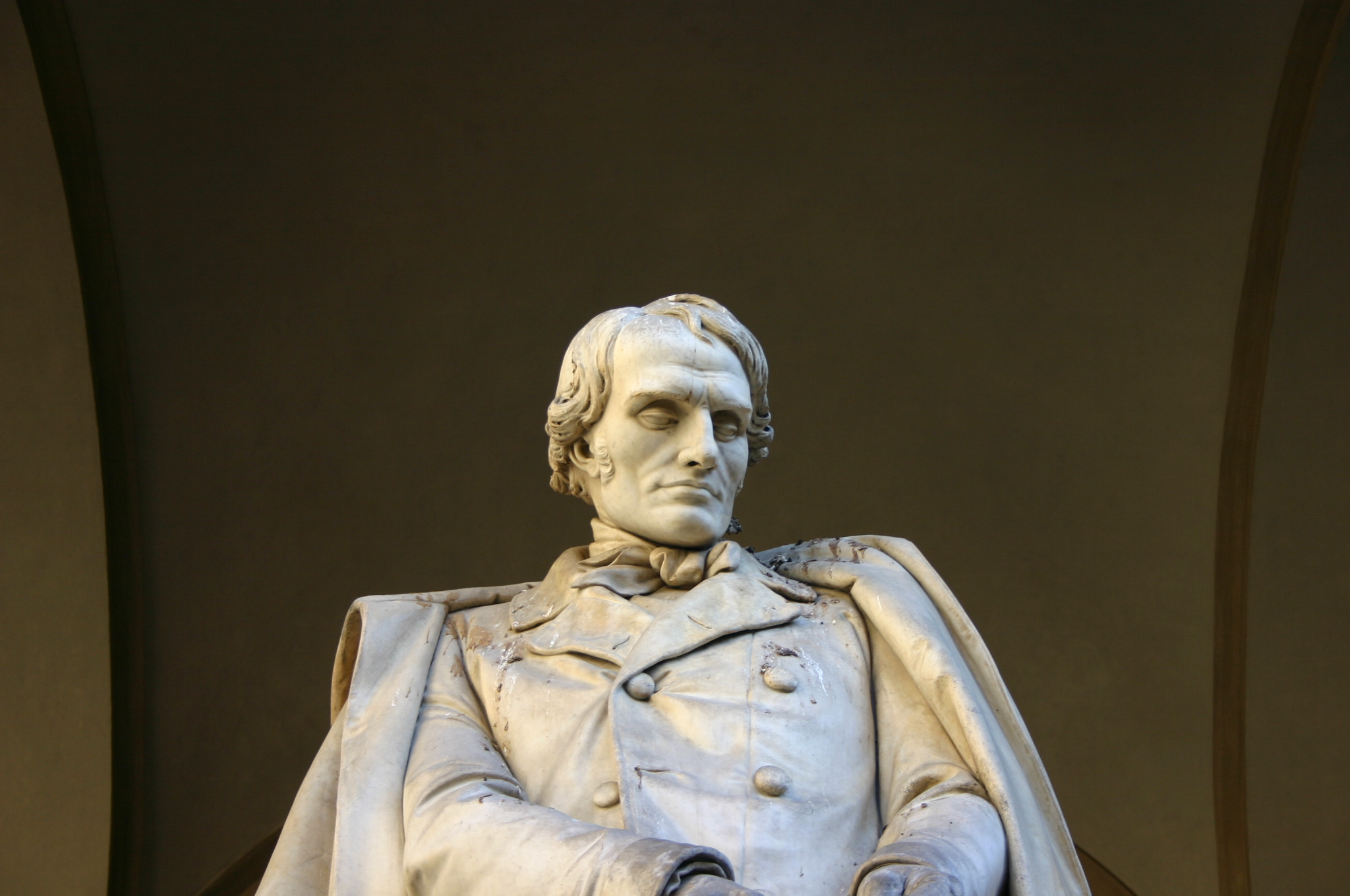
Carlo Ottavio Castiglioni

Count Carlo Ottavio Castiglioni (1784–1849) was an Italian philologist and numismatist.

== Life ==
He was born of an ancient family at Milan, Italy, in 1784.

He was descended from Baldassare Castiglione, the author of Il Cortegiano.

Early in life he displayed a great aptitude for languages and numismatics and quickly acquired a mastery of almost all the Indo-European and Semitic languages.

He died at Genoa on the 10th of April 1849. His Life, by Biondelli, appeared at Milan in 1856.

== Works ==
In 1819, he published a description of the Kufic coins in the Gabinetto of Brera at Milan, under the title, Monete cufiche del museo di Milano (Milan, 1819).

His principal work was done in connection with the Arabic and other Semitic languages, but he also performed good service in several other departments.

His principal work in Oriental literature is entitled Mémoire géographique et numismatique sur la partie orientale de la Barbarie appelée Afrikia par les Arabes, suivi de recherches sur les Berbères atlantiques (Milan, 1826). In this work, which established his reputation, he endeavours to ascertain the origin and the history of the towns in Barbary whose names are found on Arabic coins.

Outside of Italy he is perhaps best known by his edition, begun in 1819, of some fragments of the Gothic translation of the Bible by Ulfilas, which had been discovered in 1817 by Cardinal Mai among the palimpsests of the Ambrosian Library. At first Castiglioni brought out some specimens in conjunction with the cardinal, but later at various times he published by himself a number of fragments of the Epistles of St. Paul.

In 1829 he published by himself the Gothic version of the Second Epistle to the Corinthians; and this was followed by the Gothic version of the Epistle to the Romans, the First Epistle to the Corinthians, and the Epistle to the Ephesians in 1834, by Epistle to the Galatians, Philippians, and 1 Thessalonians in 1835, and by 2 Thessalonians in 1839. Besides these he wrote numerous unpublished works on linguistics.
