= Klaus-Peter Flosbach =

German politician

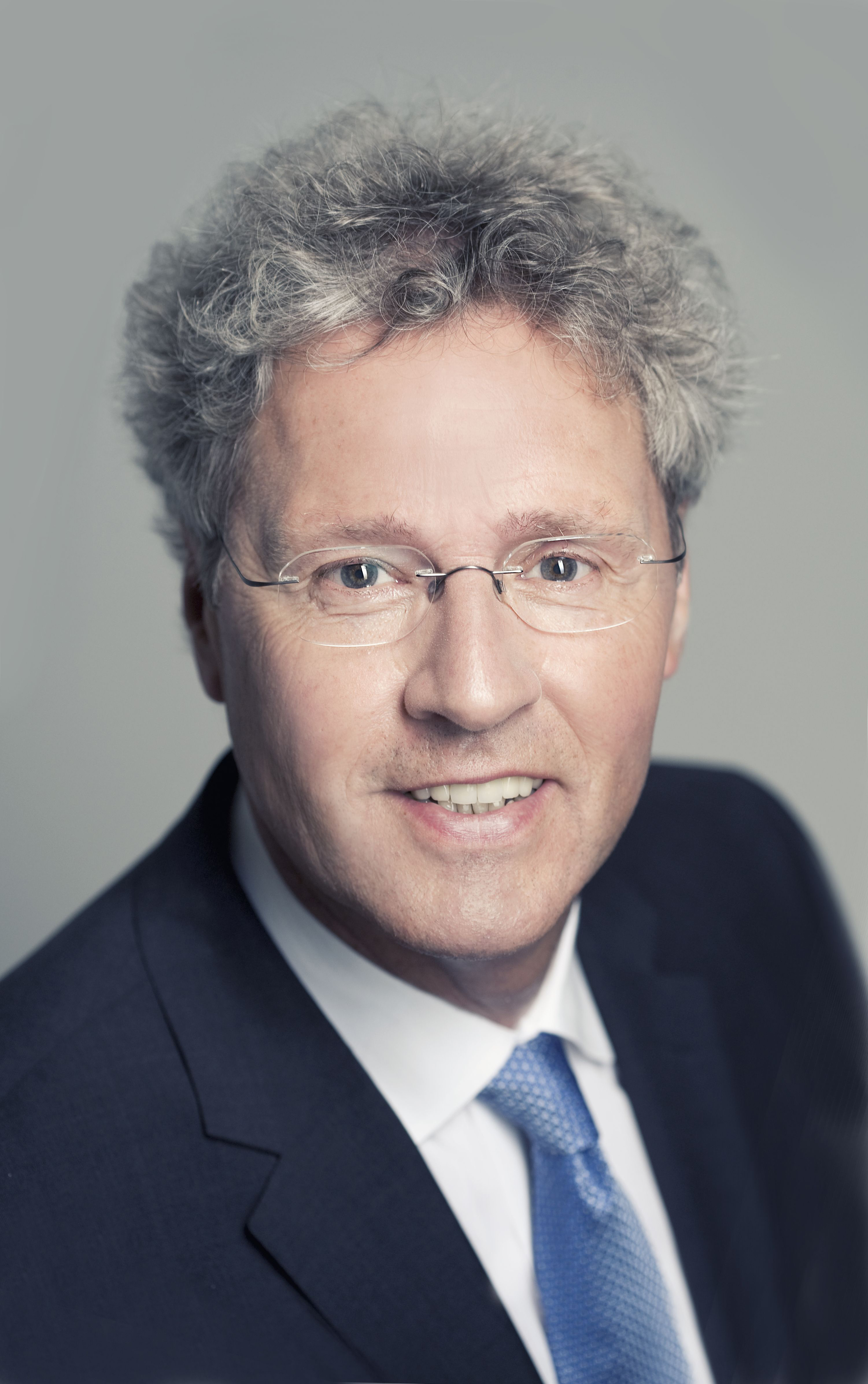
Flosbach in 2013

Klaus-Peter Flosbach (born 1952) is a German politician of the Christian Democratic Union (CDU) who was member of the Bundestag from 2002 to 2017.

== Life ==
Flosbach was born on 8 January 1952 in Wipperfürth. After getting his high school diploma at the Engelbert-von-Berg-Gymnasium of Wipperfürth, he studied economics at the University of Köln, that he completed with a diploma in 1979. In the following years, he worked as a financial consultant.

Flosbach is a catholic. He is married and has three children.

== Political work ==
Flosbach joined the CDU in 1972 and was active in the party's youth organization, the Junge Union. From 1979 to 1982, he was member of the city council of Wipperfürth and, in 1999, became member of the district parliament of the Oberbergischer Kreis.

From 2002 to 2017, he was a member of the Bundestages. During that time, he was a member of the Bundestag's finance committee and from 2011 to 2014 spokesperson of his party's financial economic policy.
