= Carsten Brodesser =

German politician

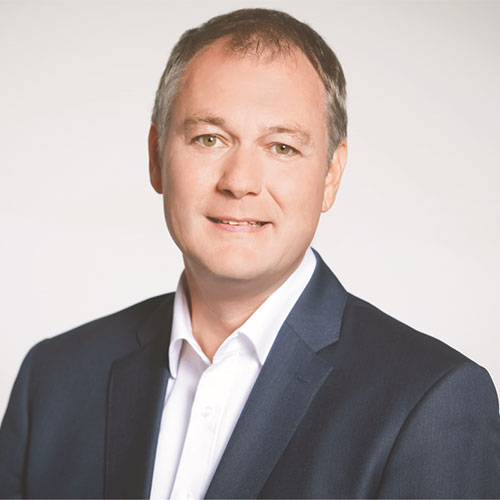
- Brodesser in 2017

Member of the Bundestag
- Incumbent
- Assumed office 2017
- Preceded by: Klaus-Peter Flosbach

Personal details
- Born: 5 September 1967 (age 58) Lindlar, West Germany
- Party: CDU
- Children: 3
- Education: University of Cologne

Carsten Brodesser (born 5 September 1967) is a German economist and politician of the Christian Democratic Union (CDU) who has been serving as a member of the Bundestag from the state of North Rhine-Westphalia since 2017.

== Political career ==
Brodesser became a member of the Bundestag in the 2017 German federal election, representing the Oberbergischer Kreis district. He is a member of the Finance Committee.

== Other activities ==
- Nuclear Waste Disposal Fund (KENFO), Alternate Member of the Board of Trustees (since 2022)
- Deutsche Renten Information (DRI), Member of the Advisory Board
