= Sozialverband Deutschland =

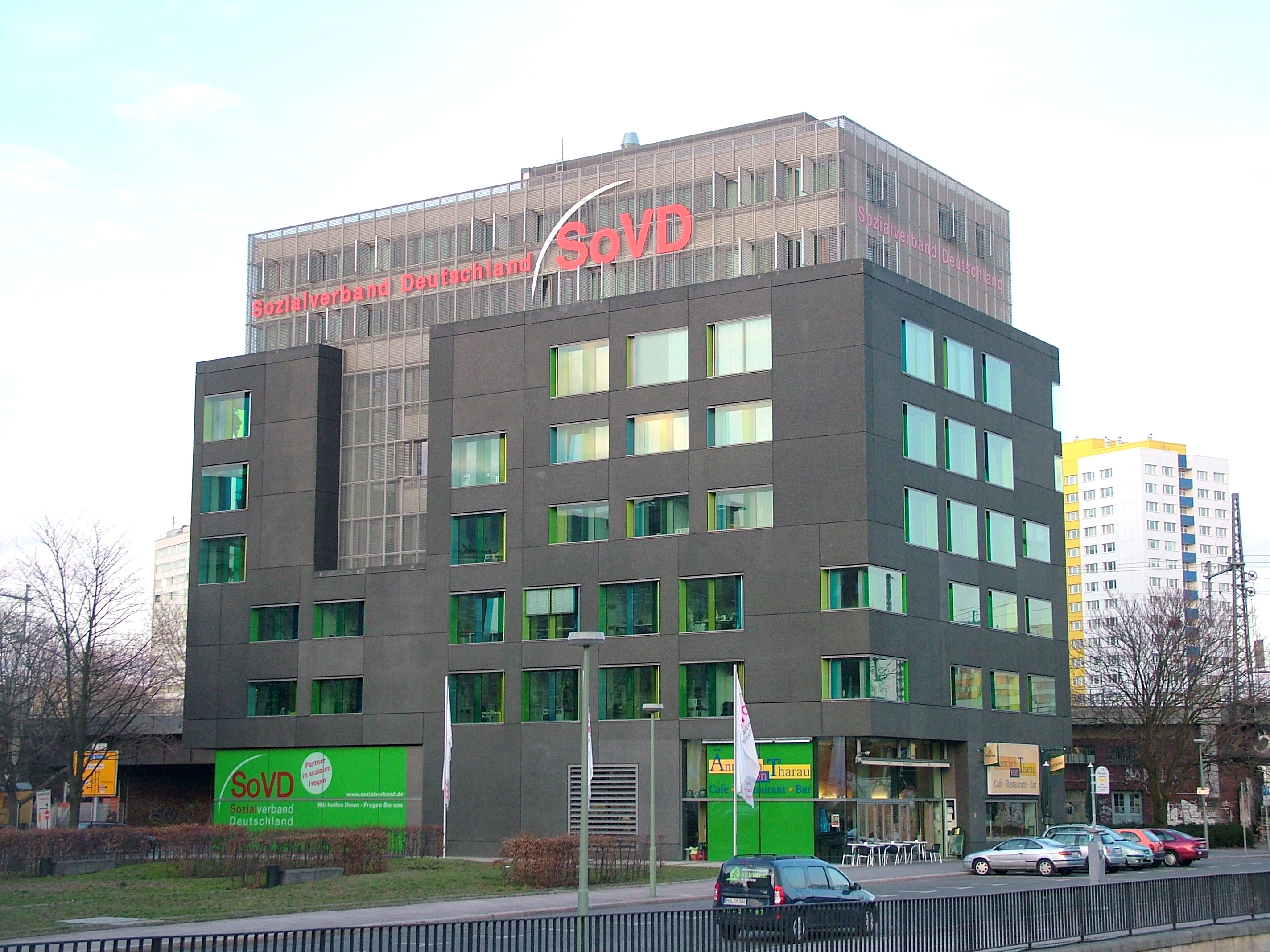
Berlin headquarters of the Sozialverband Deutschland

The Sozialverband Deutschland (Social Association of Germany) is a German socio-political advocacy organisation. It was founded in 1917 with a focus on assisting veterans of World War I as the Bund der Kriegsteilnehmer und Kriegsbeschädigten (Association of War Veterans and War Wounded), in 1918 became the Reichsbund der Kriegsbeschädigten und Kriegsteilnehmer (Imperial Association of War Veterans and War Wounded), and in 1999, after several further changes of name, became the Sozialverband Deutschland, with the note that it was founded in 1917 as the Reichsbund.

The Bund der Kriegsteilnehmer und Kriegsbeschädigten was founded on 23 May 1917 in Berlin by war wounded to advocate for wounded veterans and dependents of those killed in World War I. By 1927 it had reached 5,500 members. It was co-founded and initially headed by the Social Democratic politician and editor of Vorwärts Erich Kuttner, himself a disabled veteran who had suffered serious wounds at Verdun. The other founders were Erich Roßmann, also of the SPD, and Karl Tiedt, later a Communist and founder of an international organisation for veterans and the handicapped. The association was politically neutral, but in its early years many of its members and leaders were left-wing, and it advocated for changes in social policy, for example being instrumental in the institution of a requirement that for every hundred employees, an employer must give a job at the same salary to a handicapped veteran. It also advocated for the emancipation of women. It was revolutionary in that the veterans and victims of war were advocating on their own behalf; the mobilisation of war victims after World War I can be seen as the greatest social movement of the 20th century.

When the Nazi regime came to power in 1933, the organisation voluntarily dissolved itself. It was refounded in 1946, as the Reichsbund der Körperbeschädigten, Sozialrentner und Hinterbliebenen (Imperial Association of the Disabled, Welfare Recipients, Widowed and Orphaned). However, under the Four Powers occupation of Germany, it was initially only permitted to operate in the British sector, while a rival organisation, now the Sozialverband VdK Deutschland, was instead permitted in the French and American sectors.

In 1964, the head office relocated from Hamburg to Bonn. In 1999 it adopted its current name, with the distinguishing note, "former Reichsbund, founded 1917". Since 2003, it has been headquartered in Berlin and its head has been Adolf Bauer.

The organisation's focus has become broader. In Bremen and Stendal, they operate work training centres for the handicapped, and in Witten they operate a sheltered workshop, primarily for the mentally handicapped, which was founded by local parents as a kindergarten and training facility for their handicapped children in 1960 and celebrated its 40th anniversary as an agency of the Sozialverband in 2012. They also operate handicapped-accessible hotels and holiday centres. In 1949 the organisation founded a housing association; in 2008 this daughter company took the name meravis (for "Mensch - Raum - Vision", "Person - Space - Vision") and the following year it acquired DAWAG, the housing arm of the Vereinte Dienstleistungsgewerkschaft trade union. In addition to its work for the handicapped, the Sozialverband Deutschland currently advocates for the institution of a minimum wage and for guaranteed insurance to assist retirees, and has argued against a European Union policy of raising retirement ages. In 2006 they brought a test lawsuit to try to help unemployed people in their late fifties and early sixties who had been misled about a change in the law and wound up receiving less government assistance than they had expected.

In late 2004, a merger between the Sozialverband Deutschland and its larger rival the Sozialverband VdK Deutschland was discussed.
