= Jena – Sömmerda – Weimarer Land I =

Federal electoral district of Germany

190 Jena – Sömmerda – Weimarer Land I
- Electoral district for the Bundestag
- Jena – Sömmerda – Weimarer Land I in 2025
- State: Thuringia
- Population: 256,400 (2019)
- Electorate: 198,697 (2021)
- Major settlements: Jena; Apolda; Sömmerda
- Area: 1,637.8 km^{2}

Current electoral district
- Created: 1990
- Party: AfD
- Member: Stefan Schröder
- Elected: 2025

Jena – Sömmerda – Weimarer Land I is an electoral constituency (German: Wahlkreis) represented in the Bundestag. It elects one member via first-past-the-post voting. Under the current constituency numbering system, it is designated as constituency 190. It is located in north-central Thuringia, comprising the city of Jena, the Sömmerda district, and most of the Weimarer Land district.

Jena – Sömmerda – Weimarer Land I was created for the inaugural 1990 federal election after German reunification. From 2021 to 2025, it was represented by Holger Becker of the Social Democratic Party (SPD). Since 2025 it has been represented by Stefan Schröder of the AfD.

== Geography ==
Jena – Sömmerda – Weimarer Land I is located in north-central Thuringia. As of the 2021 federal election, it comprises the independent city of Jena, the Sömmerda district, and the entirety of the Weimarer Land excluding the municipality of Grammetal.

== History ==
Jena – Sömmerda – Weimarer Land I was created after German reunification in 1990, then known as Sömmerda – Artern – Sondershausen – Langensalza. In the 2002 election, it was named Kyffhäuserkreis – Sömmerda – Unstrut-Hainich-Kreis II. In the 2005 through 2013 elections, it was named Kyffhäuserkreis – Sömmerda – Weimarer Land I. It acquired its current name in the 2017 election. In the 1990 through 1998 elections, it was constituency 298 in the numbering system. In the 2002 and 2005 elections, it was number 192. In the 2009 through 2021 elections, it was number 191. From the 2025 election, it has been number 190.

Originally, the constituency comprised the districts of Sömmerda, Artern, Sondershausen, and Langensalza. In the 2002 election, it comprised the districts of Sömmerda and Kyffhäuserkreis as well as the municipalities of Mühlhausen, Anrode, Dünwald, Herbsleben, Menteroda, Weinbergen, and Unstruttal and the Verwaltungsgemeinschaften of Bad Tennstedt, Hildebrandshausen/Lengenfeld unterm Stein, and Schlotheim from the Unstrut-Hainich-Kreis district. In the 2005 through 2013 elections, it comprised districts of Sömmerda, Kyffhäuserkreis, and Weimarer Land excluding the municipality of Grammetal. It acquired its current borders in the 2017 election.

Election	No.	Name	Borders
1990	298	Sömmerda – Artern – Sondershausen – Langensalza	Sömmerda district; Artern district; Sondershausen district; Langensalza district
1994	298	Sömmerda – Artern – Sondershausen – Langensalza	Sömmerda district; Artern district; Sondershausen district; Langensalza district
1998	298	Sömmerda – Artern – Sondershausen – Langensalza	Sömmerda district; Artern district; Sondershausen district; Langensalza district
2002	192	Kyffhäuserkreis – Sömmerda – Unstrut-Hainich-Kreis II	Sömmerda district; Kyffhäuserkreis district; Unstrut-Hainich-Kreis district (only Mühlhausen, Anrode, Dünwald, Herbsleben, Menteroda, Weinbergen, and Unstruttal municipalities and Bad Tennstedt, Hildebrandshausen/Lengenfeld unterm Stein, and Schlotheim Verwaltungsgemeinschaften)
2005	192	Kyffhäuserkreis – Sömmerda – Weimarer Land I	Sömmerda district; Kyffhäuserkreis district; Weimarer Land (excludin Grammetal municipality)
2009	191	Kyffhäuserkreis – Sömmerda – Weimarer Land I	Sömmerda district; Kyffhäuserkreis district; Weimarer Land (excludin Grammetal municipality)
2013	191	Kyffhäuserkreis – Sömmerda – Weimarer Land I	Sömmerda district; Kyffhäuserkreis district; Weimarer Land (excludin Grammetal municipality)
2017	191	Jena – Sömmerda – Weimarer Land I	Jena city; Sömmerda district; Weimarer Land (excludin Grammetal municipality)
2021	191	Jena – Sömmerda – Weimarer Land I	Jena city; Sömmerda district; Weimarer Land (excludin Grammetal municipality)
2025	190	Jena – Sömmerda – Weimarer Land I	Jena city; Sömmerda district; Weimarer Land (excludin Grammetal municipality)

== Members ==
The constituency was first represented by Martin Göttsching of the Christian Democratic Union (CDU) from 1990 to 1994, followed by fellow CDU member Johannes Selle from 1994 to 1998. Gisela Hilbrecht won it for the Social Democratic Party (SPD) in 1998 and served until 2005, when Peter Albach regained it for the CDU. Former member Selle of the CDU was elected again in 2009, and re-elected in 2013 and 2017. Holger Becker of the SPD won the constituency in 2021.

Election	Member	Party	%
1990	Martin Göttsching	CDU	47.9
1994	Johannes Selle	CDU	43.6
1998	Gisela Hilbrecht	SPD	39.5
2002	Gisela Hilbrecht	SPD	43.0
2005	Peter Albach	CDU	30.9
2009	Johannes Selle	CDU	33.9
2013	Johannes Selle	CDU	43.3
2017	Johannes Selle	CDU	29.2
2021	Holger Becker	SPD	20.1
2025	Stafan Schröder	AfD	32.5

== Election results ==
=== 2025 election ===
Federal election (2025): Jena – Sömmerda – Weimarer Land I
Notes:	Blue background denotes the winner of the electorate vote. Pink background denotes a candidate elected from their party list. Yellow background denotes an electorate win by a list member, or other incumbent. A ✓ or ✗ denotes status of any incumbent, win or lose respectively.						
Party	Candidate	Votes	%	±%	Party votes	%	±%
AfD	Stafan Schröder	52,014	32.5	▲13.1	52,019	32.5	▲12.6
Left	Ralph Lenkert	31,246	19.5	▲2.6	29,919	18.7	▲5.9
CDU	Hendrik Blose	29,660	18.5	0.0	27,797	17.3	▲1.7
SPD	✗ Holger Becker	18,734	11.7	▼8.4	14,495	9.0	▼13.4
BSW	Luca Saß	11,455	7.2	New	14,706	9.2	New
Greens	Heiko Knopf	9,587	6.0	▼3.6	12,157	7.6	▼3.4
FDP	Tim Wagner	3,655	2.3	▼4.7	4,922	3.1	▼6.2
FW	Corina Engelhardt	3,413	2.1	▼1.8	2,236	1.4	▼1.0
Volt					1,428	0.9	▲0.4
BD					368	0.2	New
MLPD	Anatole Braungart	333	0.2	0.0	233	0.1	0.0
Informal votes		1,110			927		
Total valid votes		160,097			160,280		
Turnout		161,207	83.0	▲5.4			
AfD gain from SPD	Majority	20,768	13.0	N/A			

=== 2021 election ===
Federal election (2021): Jena – Sömmerda – Weimarer Land I
Notes:	Blue background denotes the winner of the electorate vote. Pink background denotes a candidate elected from their party list. Yellow background denotes an electorate win by a list member, or other incumbent. A ✓ or ✗ denotes status of any incumbent, win or lose respectively.						
Party	Candidate	Votes	%	±%	Party votes	%	±%
SPD	Holger Becker	30,673	20.1	▲6.0	34,195	22.4	▲9.9
AfD	Torben Braga	29,578	19.4	▲0.2	30,263	19.8	0.0
CDU	Mike Mohring	28,170	18.5	▼10.7	23,869	15.6	▼11.8
Left	Ralph Lenkert	25,741	16.9	▼4.5	19,505	12.8	▼5.7
Greens	Heiko Knopf	14,656	9.6	▲4.7	16,709	11.0	▲4.8
FDP	Tim Wagner	10,686	7.0	▲1.2	14,070	9.2	▲0.5
FW	Marion Schneider	6,018	4.0	▲0.3	3,712	2.4	▲0.6
PARTEI	Simon Wagner	3,816	2.5		2,143	1.4	▼0.4
dieBasis	Karsten Geschwandtner	2,364	1.6		2,349	1.5	
Tierschutzpartei					2,108	1.4	
Pirates					859	0.6	0.0
Volt					723	0.5	
NPD					544	0.4	▼0.7
Team Todenhöfer					342	0.2	
Menschliche Welt					318	0.2	
MLPD	Anatole Braungart	341	0.2		271	0.2	▲0.1
Humanists					238	0.2	
ÖDP					217	0.1	▼0.3
LKR	Frank Wycislok	208	0.1				
V-Partei3					140	0.1	▼0.2
Informal votes		1,912			1,588		
Total valid votes		152,251			152,575		
Turnout		154,163	77.6	▲1.2			
SPD gain from CDU	Majority	1,095	0.7				

=== 2017 election ===
Federal election (2017): Jena – Sömmerda – Weimarer Land I
Notes:	Blue background denotes the winner of the electorate vote. Pink background denotes a candidate elected from their party list. Yellow background denotes an electorate win by a list member, or other incumbent. A ✓ or ✗ denotes status of any incumbent, win or lose respectively.						
Party	Candidate	Votes	%	±%	Party votes	%	±%
CDU	✓ Johannes Selle	44,684	29.2	▼9.3	42,092	27.4	▼8.5
Left	Ralph Lenkert	32,680	21.4	▼3.7	28,312	18.5	▼4.6
AfD	Denny Jankowski	29,451	19.3	▲17.5	30,426	19.8	▲14.1
SPD	Christoph Matschie	21,668	14.2	▼5.6	19,150	12.5	▼4.0
FDP	Jan Siegemund	8,939	5.8	▲3.9	13,310	8.7	▲5.5
Greens	Olaf Müller	7,544	4.9	▼0.4	9,497	6.2	▼1.1
PARTEI					2,841	1.9	
FW	Andreas Weise	5,612	3.7	▲3.4	2,815	1.8	▲0.5
NPD					1,660	1.1	▼1.6
Independent	Marion Schneider	1,550	1.0				
Pirates					790	0.5	▼2.8
ÖDP					653	0.4	▼0.3
BGE					641	0.4	
Independent	Michael Gruner	556	0.4				
DM					531	0.3	
V-Partei³					474	0.3	
Independent	Ilka May	211	0.1				
MLPD					164	0.1	0.0
Informal votes		2,315			1,854		
Total valid votes		152,895			153,356		
Turnout		155,210	76.4	▲6.2			
CDU hold	Majority	12,004	7.8	▼9.0			

=== 2013 election ===
Federal election (2013): Kyffhäuserkreis – Sömmerda – Weimarer Land I
Notes:	Blue background denotes the winner of the electorate vote. Pink background denotes a candidate elected from their party list. Yellow background denotes an electorate win by a list member, or other incumbent. A ✓ or ✗ denotes status of any incumbent, win or lose respectively.						
Party	Candidate	Votes	%	±%	Party votes	%	±%
CDU	✓ Johannes Selle	54,350	43.3	▲9.5	49,099	39.1	▲7.6
Left	Kersten Steinke	33,239	26.5	▼4.9	30,821	24.5	▼5.5
SPD	Steffen-Claudio Lemme	21,469	17.1	▼1.0	19,365	15.4	▼1.8
AfD					7,199	5.7	
NPD	Patrick Weber	5,609	4.5	▲0.6	4,645	3.7	▲0.2
Pirates	Klaus Jürgen Sommerfeld	4,551	3.6		3,071	2.4	▲0.4
Greens	Nicol Pfefferlein	3,948	3.1	▼1.4	4,734	3.8	▼1.0
FDP	Patrick Kurth	2,253	1.8	▼6.0	3,672	2.9	▼7.1
FW					1,914	1.5	
ÖDP					655	0.5	▲0.2
REP					302	0.2	▼0.1
MLPD					146	0.1	0.0
Informal votes		2,487			2,283		
Total valid votes		125,419			125,623		
Turnout		127,906	66.9	▲3.2			
CDU hold	Majority	21,111	16.8	▲14.3			

=== 2009 election ===
Federal election (2009): Kyffhäuserkreis – Sömmerda – Weimarer Land I
Notes:	Blue background denotes the winner of the electorate vote. Pink background denotes a candidate elected from their party list. Yellow background denotes an electorate win by a list member, or other incumbent. A ✓ or ✗ denotes status of any incumbent, win or lose respectively.						
Party	Candidate	Votes	%	±%	Party votes	%	±%
CDU	Johannes Selle	42,674	33.9	▲3.0	39,696	31.5	▼4.9
Left	Kersten Naumann	39,568	31.4	▲4.2	37,923	30.1	▲3.3
SPD	Steffen-Claudio Lemme	22,819	18.1	▼11.4	21,692	17.2	▼11.3
FDP	Patrick Kurth	9,800	7.8	▲2.8	12,661	10.0	▲2.1
Greens	Janet Lutz	5,754	4.6	▲1.7	6,064	4.8	▲0.8
NPD	Patrick Weber	4,855	3.9	▼0.7	4,383	3.5	▼0.6
Pirates					2,581	2.0	
Independent	Bodo Rothe	595	0.5				
REP					491	0.4	▼0.4
ÖDP					406	0.3	
MLPD					186	0.1	▼0.2
Informal votes		1,860			1,842		
Total valid votes		126,065			126,083		
Turnout		127,925	63.7	▼11.1			
CDU hold	Majority	16,749	2.5	▲1.1			

=== 2005 election ===
Federal election (2005):Kyffhäuserkreis – Sömmerda – Weimarer Land I
Notes:	Blue background denotes the winner of the electorate vote. Pink background denotes a candidate elected from their party list. Yellow background denotes an electorate win by a list member, or other incumbent. A ✓ or ✗ denotes status of any incumbent, win or lose respectively.						
Party	Candidate	Votes	%	±%	Party votes	%	±%
CDU	Peter Albach	46,738	30.9	▲0.1	40,334	26.6	▼3.1
SPD	Ulrike Marx	44,638	29.5	▼12.3	43,332	28.5	▼11.6
Left	Kersten Naumann	41,234	27.2	▲9.2	40,688	26.8	▲10.1
FDP	Heinz Untermann	7,596	5.0	▼1.8	12,115	8.0	▲1.9
NPD	Patrick Weber	6,824	4.5		6,187	4.1	▲3.1
Greens	Barbel Seifert	4,391	2.9	▲0.3	6,037	4.0	▲0.5
GRAUEN					1,340	0.9	▲0.5
REP					1,274	0.8	▼0.1
MLPD					501	0.3	
Informal votes		3,661			3,274		
Total valid votes		151,421			151,808		
Turnout		155,082	74.8	▲1.0			
CDU gain from SPD	Majority	2,100	1.4				
