= Eichsfeld – Nordhausen – Kyffhäuserkreis =

Federal electoral district of Germany

188 Eichsfeld – Nordhausen – Kyffhäuserkreis
- Electoral district for the Bundestag
- Eichsfeld – Nordhausen – Kyffhäuserkreis in 2025
- State: Thuringia
- Population: 257,600 (2019)
- Electorate: 209,203 (2021)
- Major settlements: Nordhausen; Sondershausen; Leinefelde-Worbis
- Area: 2,694.9 km^{2}

Current electoral district
- Created: 1990
- Party: AfD
- Member: Christopher Drößler
- Elected: 2025

Eichsfeld – Nordhausen – Kyffhäuserkreis is an electoral constituency (German: Wahlkreis) represented in the Bundestag. It elects one member via first-past-the-post voting. Under the current constituency numbering system, it is designated as constituency 188. It is located in northern Thuringia, comprising the districts of Nordhausen, Eichsfeld, and Kyffhäuserkreis.

Eichsfeld – Nordhausen – Kyffhäuserkreis was created for the inaugural 1990 federal election after German reunification. From 1994 to 2025, it was represented by Manfred Grund of the Christian Democratic Union (CDU). Since 2025 it has been represented by Christopher Drößler of the AfD.

== Geography ==
Eichsfeld – Nordhausen – Kyffhäuserkreis is located in northern Thuringia. As of the 2025 federal election, it comprises the districts of Eichsfeld, Nordhausen, and Kyffhäuserkreis.

== History ==
Eichsfeld – Nordhausen – Kyffhäuserkreis was created after German reunification in 1990, then known as Nordhausen – Worbis – Heiligenstadt. In the 2002 election, it was named Eichsfeld – Nordhausen. In the 2005 through 2013 elections, it was named Eichsfeld – Nordhausen – Unstrut-Hainich-Kreis I. It acquired its current name in the 2017 election. In the 1990 through 1998 elections, it was constituency 296 in the numbering system. In the 2002 and 2005 elections, it was number 190. In the 2009 through 2021 elections, it was number 189. From the 2025 election, it has been number 188.

Originally, the constituency comprised the districts of Nordhausen, Worbis, and Heiligenstadt. In the 2002 election, it comprised the districts of Nordhausen and Eichsfeld. In the 2005 through 2013 elections, it comprised the districts of Nordhausen and Eichsfeld as well as the municipalities of Mühlhausen, Anrode, Dünwald, and Unstruttal and the Verwaltungsgemeinschaft of Hildebrandshausen/Lengenfeld unterm Stein from the Unstrut-Hainich-Kreis district. It acquired its current borders in the 2017 election.

Election	No.	Name	Borders
1990	296	Nordhausen – Worbis – Heiligenstadt	Nordhausen district; Worbis district; Heiligenstadt district
1994	296	Nordhausen – Worbis – Heiligenstadt	Nordhausen district; Worbis district; Heiligenstadt district
1998	296	Nordhausen – Worbis – Heiligenstadt	Nordhausen district; Worbis district; Heiligenstadt district
2002	190	Nordhausen – Worbis – Heiligenstadt	Nordhausen district; Eichsfeld district
2005	190	Eichsfeld – Nordhausen – Unstrut-Hainich-Kreis I	Nordhausen district; Eichsfeld district; Unstrut-Hainich-Kreis district (only Mühlhausen, Anrode, Dünwald, and Unstruttal municipalities and Hildebrandshausen/Lengenfeld unterm Stein Verwaltungsgemeinschaft)
2009	189	Eichsfeld – Nordhausen – Unstrut-Hainich-Kreis I	Nordhausen district; Eichsfeld district; Unstrut-Hainich-Kreis district (only Mühlhausen, Anrode, Dünwald, and Unstruttal municipalities and Hildebrandshausen/Lengenfeld unterm Stein Verwaltungsgemeinschaft)
2013	189	Eichsfeld – Nordhausen – Unstrut-Hainich-Kreis I	Nordhausen district; Eichsfeld district; Unstrut-Hainich-Kreis district (only Mühlhausen, Anrode, Dünwald, and Unstruttal municipalities and Hildebrandshausen/Lengenfeld unterm Stein Verwaltungsgemeinschaft)
2017	189	Eichsfeld – Nordhausen – Kyffhäuserkreis	Nordhausen district; Eichsfeld district; Kyffhäuserkreis district
2021	189	Eichsfeld – Nordhausen – Kyffhäuserkreis	Nordhausen district; Eichsfeld district; Kyffhäuserkreis district
2025	188	Eichsfeld – Nordhausen – Kyffhäuserkreis	Nordhausen district; Eichsfeld district; Kyffhäuserkreis district

== Members ==
The constituency was first represented by Gerhard Reddemann of the Christian Democratic Union (CDU) from 1990 to 1994. Manfred Grund of the CDU was elected in 1994, and re-elected in 1998, 2002, 2005, 2009, 2013, 2017, and 2021.

Election	Member	Party	%
1990	Gerhard Reddemann	CDU	56.6
1994	Manfred Grund	CDU	51.4
1998	Manfred Grund	CDU	40.1
2002	Manfred Grund	CDU	41.3
2005	Manfred Grund	CDU	37.4
2009	Manfred Grund	CDU	43.0
2013	Manfred Grund	CDU	49.8
2017	Manfred Grund	CDU	38.0
2021	Manfred Grund	CDU	26.6
2025	Christopher Drößler	AfD	39.5

== Election results ==
=== 2025 election ===
Federal election (2025): Eichsfeld – Nordhausen – Kyffhäuserkreis
Notes:	Blue background denotes the winner of the electorate vote. Pink background denotes a candidate elected from their party list. Yellow background denotes an electorate win by a list member, or other incumbent. A ✓ or ✗ denotes status of any incumbent, win or lose respectively.						
Party	Candidate	Votes	%	±%	Party votes	%	±%
AfD	Christopher Drößler	65,025	39.5	▲16.9	64,144	38.9	▲16.5
CDU	David Gregosz	45,730	27.8	▲0.9	38,444	23.3	▲1.1
Left	Donata Vogtschmidt	19,528	11.9	▲1.1	21,894	13.3	▲3.5
SPD	Mohamed Sayed	14,360	8.7	▼13.4	14,096	8.6	▼15.7
BSW	Robert Henning	12,714	7.7	New	14,085	8.6	New
FDP	Marcel Hardrath	3,818	2.3	▼4.5	4,877	3.0	▼6.1
Greens	Kai Klemm-Lorenz	3,000	1.8	▼2.0	4,425	2.7	▼2.0
FW					1,702	1.0	▼0.8
Volt					485	0.3	▲0.1
BD					373	0.2	New
MLPD	Ilka May	342	0.2	0.0	174	0.1	▼0.1
Informal votes		1,357			1,175		
Total valid votes		164,517			164,699		
Turnout		165,874	80.3	▲6.4			
AfD gain from CDU	Majority	19,295	11.7	N/A			

=== 2021 election ===
Federal election (2021): Eichsfeld – Nordhausen – Kyffhäuserkreis
Notes:	Blue background denotes the winner of the electorate vote. Pink background denotes a candidate elected from their party list. Yellow background denotes an electorate win by a list member, or other incumbent. A ✓ or ✗ denotes status of any incumbent, win or lose respectively.						
Party	Candidate	Votes	%	±%	Party votes	%	±%
CDU	✓ Manfred Grund	40,599	26.6	▼11.4	33,662	22.0	▼11.7
AfD	Jürgen Pohl	34,645	22.7	▲1.3	34,296	22.5	▲1.4
SPD	Anne Bressem	34,010	22.3	▲8.0	37,282	24.4	▲10.5
Left	Sigrid Hupach	16,586	10.9	▼4.4	15,166	9.9	▼4.6
FDP	Patrick Kurth	10,348	6.8	▲1.9	13,695	9.0	▲1.3
Greens	Heike Möller	5,901	3.9	▲1.3	7,176	4.7	▲1.6
FW	Helmut Günther	3,981	2.6	▲0.8	2,826	1.9	▲0.5
Tierschutzpartei					2,049	1.3	
PARTEI	Katja Staffehl	3,076	2.0		1,668	1.1	▲0.1
dieBasis	Andreas Schneider	2,129	1.4		1,975	1.3	
NPD					626	0.4	▼1.2
Pirates					483	0.3	0.0
ÖDP	Marius Braun	849	0.6	▼0.7	478	0.3	▼0.4
Menschliche Welt					356	0.2	
Volt					278	0.2	
MLPD	Kurt-Peter Kleffel	366	0.2		255	0.2	▲0.1
Team Todenhöfer					210	0.1	
Humanists					117	0.1	
V-Partei3					80	0.1	▼0.1
Informal votes		1,998			1,810		
Total valid votes		152,490			152,678		
Turnout		154,488	73.8	▲0.8			
CDU hold	Majority	5,954	3.9	▼12.7			

=== 2017 election ===
Federal election (2017): Eichsfeld – Nordhausen – Kyffhäuserkreis
Notes:	Blue background denotes the winner of the electorate vote. Pink background denotes a candidate elected from their party list. Yellow background denotes an electorate win by a list member, or other incumbent. A ✓ or ✗ denotes status of any incumbent, win or lose respectively.						
Party	Candidate	Votes	%	±%	Party votes	%	±%
CDU	✓ Manfred Grund	59,318	38.0	▼9.9	52,667	33.8	▼9.7
AfD	Jürgen Pohl	33,402	21.4		32,854	21.1	▲16.0
Left	Kersten Steinke	23,848	15.3	▼7.0	22,613	14.5	▼7.2
SPD	Steffen-Claudio Lemme	22,320	14.3	▼2.0	21,652	13.9	▼1.4
FDP	Ronald Krügel	7,633	4.9	▲3.5	11,974	7.7	▲5.0
Greens	Stephanie Kespohl	3,992	2.6	▼0.5	4,778	3.1	▼0.7
NPD					2,473	1.6	▼1.6
FW	Uwe Reiche	2,869	1.8	▲0.4	2,167	1.4	▼0.2
PARTEI					1,474	0.9	
ÖDP	Karl-Edmund Vogt	1,929	1.2	▼0.3	1,166	0.7	▼0.3
BGE					865	0.6	
Pirates					503	0.3	▼1.6
Independent	Severin Rascopp	386	0.2				
Independent	Eckehart Rieth	378	0.2				
DM					349	0.2	
V-Partei³					241	0.2	
MLPD					153	0.1	0.0
Informal votes		2,264			2,410		
Total valid votes		156,075			155,929		
Turnout		158,339	73.1	▲5.5			
CDU hold	Majority	25,916	16.6	▼13.4			

=== 2013 election ===
Federal election (2013): Eichsfeld – Nordhausen – Unstrut-Hainich-Kreis I
Notes:	Blue background denotes the winner of the electorate vote. Pink background denotes a candidate elected from their party list. Yellow background denotes an electorate win by a list member, or other incumbent. A ✓ or ✗ denotes status of any incumbent, win or lose respectively.						
Party	Candidate	Votes	%	±%	Party votes	%	±%
CDU	✓ Manfred Grund	65,784	49.8	▲6.9	59,234	44.8	▲6.4
Left	Sigrid Hupach	26,091	19.8	▼4.7	26,322	19.9	▼4.1
SPD	Carmen Listemann	21,826	16.5	▼0.4	20,182	15.3	▼1.3
AfD					6,995	5.3	
NPD	Thorsten Heise	4,371	3.3	▲0.5	3,767	2.9	▲0.2
Greens	Norbert Sondermann	4,129	3.1	▼1.0	5,293	4.0	▼0.8
Pirates	Heiko Windisch	2,702	2.0		2,366	1.8	▲0.1
ÖDP	Susann Mai	2,671	2.0	▲1.0	1,646	1.2	▲0.5
FW	Marco Tasch	2,606	2.0		2,387	1.8	
FDP	Steffen Dreiling	1,825	1.4	▼6.0	3,661	2.8	▼7.9
REP					199	0.2	▼0.1
MLPD					103	0.1	0.0
Informal votes		2,008			1,858		
Total valid votes		132,005			132,155		
Turnout		134,013	68.2	▲1.5			
CDU hold	Majority	39,693	30.0	▲11.5			

=== 2009 election ===
Federal election (2009): Eichsfeld – Nordhausen – Unstrut-Hainich-Kreis I
Notes:	Blue background denotes the winner of the electorate vote. Pink background denotes a candidate elected from their party list. Yellow background denotes an electorate win by a list member, or other incumbent. A ✓ or ✗ denotes status of any incumbent, win or lose respectively.						
Party	Candidate	Votes	%	±%	Party votes	%	±%
CDU	✓ Manfred Grund	57,882	43.0	▲5.6	51,863	38.5	▼6.1
Left	Alexander Scharff	33,005	24.5	▲3.8	32,391	24.0	▲1.7
SPD	Joachim Schwiderke	22,854	17.0	▼12.8	22,341	16.6	▼11.7
FDP	Andreas Klaschka	9,942	7.4	▲2.6	14,382	10.7	▲2.3
Greens	Michael Hoffmeier	5,540	4.1	▲1.6	6,507	4.8	▲0.9
NPD	Thorsten Heise	3,798	2.8	▼0.5	3,631	2.7	▼0.5
Pirates					2,309	1.7	
ÖDP	Karl-Edmund Vogt	1,416	1.1		1,009	0.7	
Independent	Bärbel Macamo	309	0.2				
REP					299	0.2	▼0.3
MLPD					127	0.1	▼0.2
Informal votes		1,658			1,545		
Total valid votes		134,746			134,859		
Turnout		136,404	66.6	▼9.3			
CDU hold	Majority	24,877	18.5	▲10.8			

=== 2005 election ===
Federal election (2005):Eichsfeld – Nordhausen – Unstrut-Hainich-Kreis I
Notes:	Blue background denotes the winner of the electorate vote. Pink background denotes a candidate elected from their party list. Yellow background denotes an electorate win by a list member, or other incumbent. A ✓ or ✗ denotes status of any incumbent, win or lose respectively.						
Party	Candidate	Votes	%	±%	Party votes	%	±%
CDU	✓ Manfred Grund	57,982	37.4	▼2.2	50,360	32.4	▼4.3
SPD	Manuel Müller	46,127	29.7	▼6.8	44,045	28.3	▼9.3
Left	Johanna Scheringer-Wright	32,141	20.7	▲5.6	34,797	22.4	▲9.0
FDP	Franka Hitzing	7,455	4.8	▼0.3	13,068	8.4	▲2.7
NPD	Thorsten Heise	5,134	3.3		4,950	3.2	▲2.5
Greens	Julian Karwath	3,824	2.5	▼0.1	6,121	3.9	▲0.4
Familie	Karl-Edmund Vogt	2,559	1.6				
GRAUEN					1,082	0.7	▲0.4
REP					750	0.5	▼0.1
MLPD					403	0.3	
Informal votes		3,123			2,769		
Total valid votes		155,222			155,576		
Turnout		158,345	76.0	▲0.3			
CDU hold	Majority	11,855	7.7				
