= Sigrid Hupach =

German politician

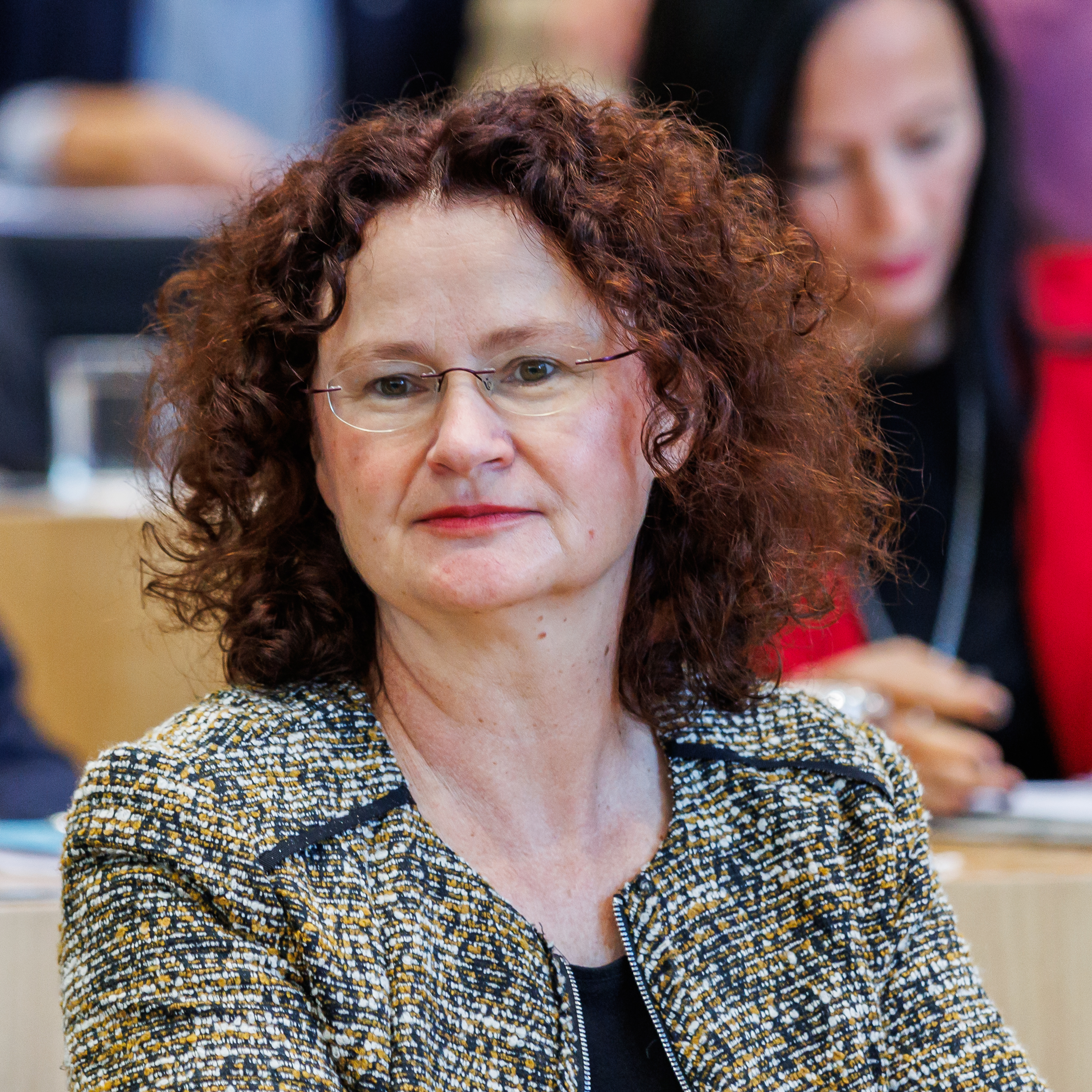
Hupach in the Thuringian state parliament after the election in 2024

Sigrid Hupach (born 1968 in Leinefelde, Thuringia, East Germany) is a German politician who served as a member of the German Bundestag for the Left Party from 2013 to 2017. Since 2024, she has been a member of the Thuringian State Parliament for the Alliance Sahra Wagenknecht, being one of the two deputy leaders of that Party's state association.

== Life ==
Sigrid Hupach was born on 9 September 1968 in Leinefelde, where she attended the Geschwister Scholl Polytechnic Secondary School from 1975 to 1985. From 1985 to 1987, she received training as a Facharbeiter für Schreibtechnik - an officially recognized office management job of East Germany. From 1993 to 1994, she went to a technical college for economics and studied architecture at the University of Applied Sciences in Erfurt from 1995 to 2000. She then studied philosophy in Göttingen until 2001 studied. From 2001 to 2002, she completed further training in media design in Braunschweig. After years of working as a low-level employee during the time she studied, she did freelance work as an architect and media designer from 2006 to 2010.

In 2007, Hupach joined the Left Party. From 2012 to 2013 she was a constituency worker in Mühlhausen for then-member of the Thuringian state parliament Jörg Kubitzki (the Left). In 2009, she became the leader of her party's Eichsfeld district association, after being elected into the local district council in July. From November 2011 to November 2013 she was a member of the executive board of the Left Party's state association.

In the 2013 German federal election, she was her Party's candidate in the Eichsfeld – Nordhausen – Unstrut-Hainich-Kreis I electoral district, where she received 26.091 (19.8%) votes, coming second after Manfred Grund of the Christian Democratic Union. Nevertheless, she received a mandate in the Bundestag through the so-called state list. During her time as a member of the Bundestag, she was the chairwoman of the Committee on Culture and the Media. In the 2017 election, she did not run, the new candidate for the electoral district being Kersten Steinke, who came third with 23.848 (15.3%) of the votes. In the most recent federal election of 2021, Hupach sought re-election in her electoral district but placed only fourth with 16.586 (10.9%) votes.

Between 2021 and 2024, she left the Left Party for the Sahra Wagenknecht Alliance. On 15 March 2024, her Party elected her one of the deputy leaders of the Thuringian state association along with Matthias Herzog, behind Katja Wolf and Steffen Schütz. In the Thuringian state election of 2024, she got a seat in the parliament. After the election, her party along with the Social Democratic Party and the Christian Democratic Union created the Voigt cabinet in a coalition government colloquially known as Blackberry Coalition, in which Hupach herself does not occupy a ministerial post.

=== Personal life ===
She is divorced and has three sons.
