= Albach =

Albach may refer to:

- Peter Albach (born 1956), German politician
- Albach (Wetter), a river of Hesse, Germany, tributary of the Wetter

== See also ==
- Rosa Albach-Retty (1874–1980), Austrian actress
- Wolf Albach-Retty (1906–1967), Austrian actor
