= Christopher Drößler =

German politician (born 1995)

Member of the Bundestag
- Incumbent
- Assumed office March 2025
- Preceded by: Manfred Grund
- Constituency: Eichsfeld – Nordhausen – Kyffhäuserkreis

Personal details
- Born: 1995 (age 30–31) Leinefelde
- Party: Alternative for Germany

Christopher Drößler (born 1995 in Leinefelde) is a extreme right-wing German politician who was elected as a member of the Bundestag in 2025. He is the leader of Alternative for Germany in the district council of Eichsfeld and the municipal council of Küllstedt.
