= Stefan Schröder (politician) =

German politician (born 1983)

Member of the Bundestag
- Incumbent
- Assumed office March 2025
- Preceded by: Holger Becker
- Constituency: Jena – Sömmerda – Weimarer Land I

Member of the Landtag of Thuringia
- In office 16 July 2024 – 26 September 2024
- Preceded by: René Aust

Personal details
- Born: 30 May 1983 (age 43)
- Party: Alternative for Germany

Stefan Schröder (born 30 May 1983) is a German politician who was as a elected member of the Bundestag in 2025. He previously served in the Landtag of Thuringia.
