= Schillingstedt =

- Stadtteil of Sömmerda
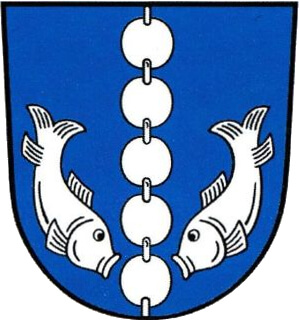
- Coat of arms
- Interactive map of Schillingstedt
- Location within Germany Location within Thuringia
- Coordinates: 51°13′53″N 11°12′9″E
- Country: Germany
- State: Thuringia
- District: Sömmerda
- Town: Sömmerda

Area
  - Total: 6.46 km^{2} (2.49 sq mi)
- Elevation: 146 m (479 ft)

Population (2016-12-31)
  - Total: 227
  - Density: 35.1/km^{2} (91.0/sq mi)
- Time zone: UTC+01:00 (CET)
  - Summer (DST): UTC+02:00 (CEST)
- Postal codes: 99625
- Dialling codes: 03635
- Vehicle registration: SÖM
- Website: www.koelleda.de

Schillingstedt (German pronunciation: [ˈʃɪlɪŋʃtɛt]) is a village and a former municipality in the Sömmerda district of Thuringia, Germany. Since July 2018, it is part of the town Sömmerda.
