= Holger Becker =

German politician (born 1964)

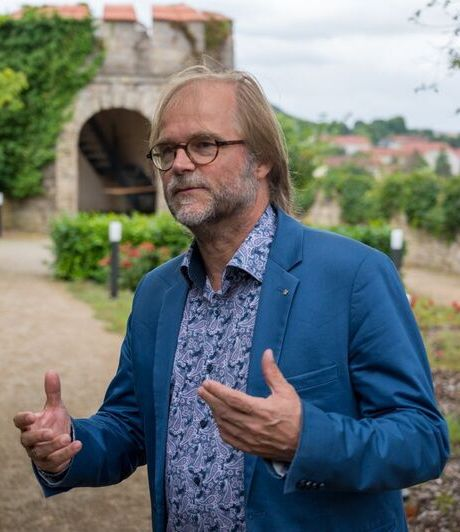

Member of the Bundestag
- Incumbent
- Assumed office October 2021
- Preceded by: Johannes Selle
- Constituency: Jena – Sömmerda – Weimarer Land I

Personal details
- Born: 15 July 1964 (age 61) Kusel, West Germany
- Party: SPD

Holger Becker (born 15 July 1964) is a German businessman and politician of the Social Democratic Party (SPD) who has been serving as a member of the Bundestag since the 2021 German federal election, representing the constituency of Jena – Sömmerda – Weimarer Land I.

== Early life and education ==
Becker studied physics at the University of Heidelberg and at University of Western Australia in Perth from 1985 to 1991. He subsequently worked as a research associate at the University of Heidelberg and earned a doctorate (Dr. rer.nat.) in 1995. He was a research associate at Imperial College London from 1995 to 1997.

== Career in the private sector ==
Becker worked at Jenoptik from 1998 until 2000.

== Political career ==
In parliament, Becker has been serving on the Committee on Education, Research and Technology Assessment and the Committee on Digitization.

== Other activities ==
- Helmholtz Association of German Research Centres, Ex-Officio Member of the Senate (since 2022)
- German Physical Society (DPG), Member of the Board (2000–2015, since 2021)
- Association of German Engineers (VDI), Member
