= Leubingen tumulus =

Early Bronze Age royal grave of the Auntjetitz culture

- Fürstengrab von Leubingen (German)
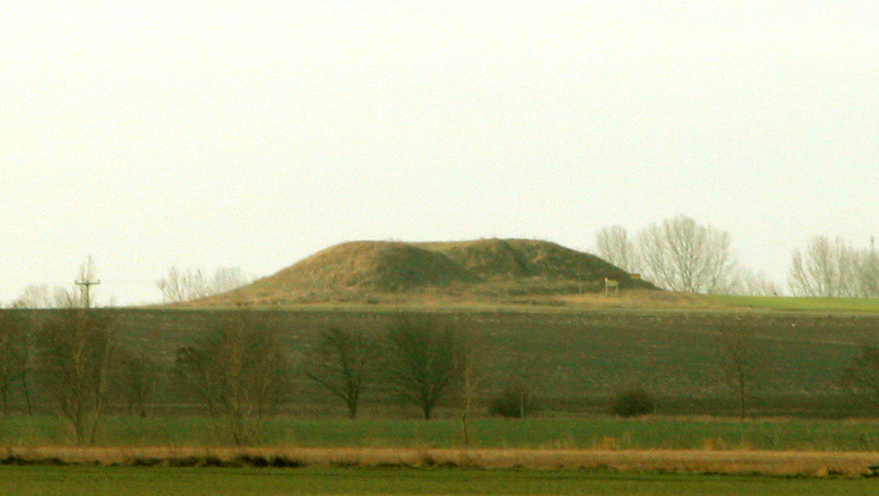
- The Leubingen tumulus

- Location in Germany
- 51°11′25″N 11°10′11″E
- Type: tumulus
- Periods: Early Bronze Age
- Cultures: Únětice culture
- Location: Leubingen, Sömmerda
- Region: Thuringia, Germany

History
- Built: c. 2000 BC

Site notes
- Archaeologists: Friedrich Klopfleisch
- Discovered: 1877

The Leubingen tumulus (German: Fürstengrab von Leubingen) is an Early Bronze Age "princely" grave of the Leubingen culture, (which, after further finds at Auntjetitz became known as Auntjetitz or Únětice culture), dating to about 1940 BC. It is located near the hills of Kyffhäuser in Leubingen, an Ortsteil of Sömmerda in the eastern German state of Thuringia.

== Excavations ==
The site was first unearthed in 1877 by Jena art professor and archaeologist Friedrich Klopfleisch (1831–1898). He was working at the behest of the Historische Kommission der Provinz Sachsen. Klopfleisch kept a diary during his work and latter submitted an official report on the findings. Unfortunately, there are important differences between his original notes and the final report. Both the location of the burial chamber and of the grave goods within the chamber vary. During the excavations no second body is mentioned (see Description below), only a few bone remains. Today, the diary is deemed the more reliable source.

After the excavations were finished, the mound was filled in again. In 1912, the local Königlicher Landrat ordered the Leubingen authorities to prevent its agricultural use.

During road construction in 2011 excavations on the site nearby have also revealed the remains of one of the largest buildings in prehistoric Germany, a longhouse 44 m x 10.50 m, or 470 square meters (5,057 square feet) of floor space, a trove of bronze objects, and a cemetery of 44 farmers.

== Dating and evaluation ==
Dendrochronologic testing of the oaken beams has placed the grave at circa 1942 BC.

The tomb is considered one of the most opulent elite grave of the Early Bronze Age in Western Europe. Due to the effort required for its construction and the quality of the grave goods, the buried person must have been of great importance.

== Description ==
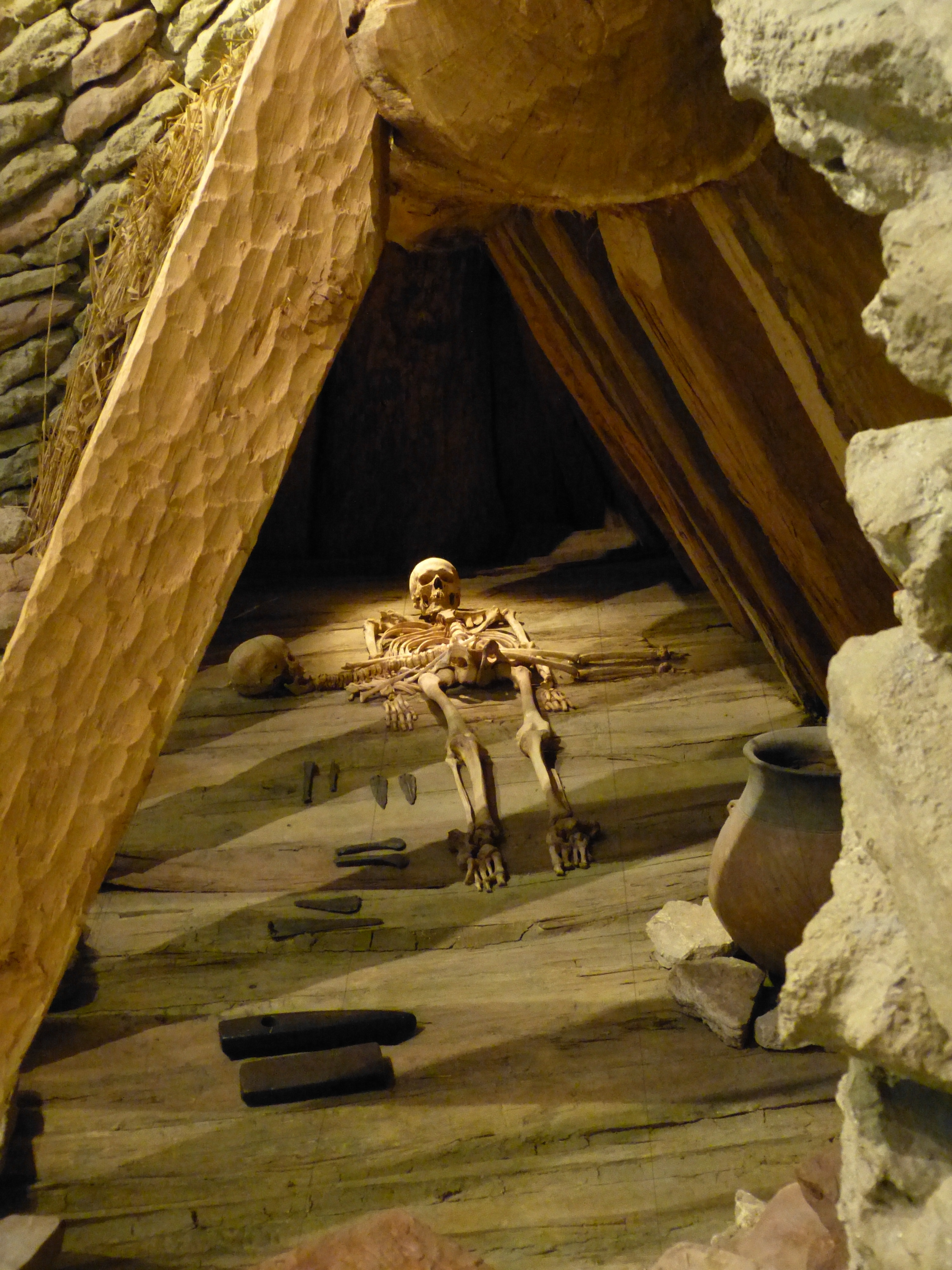
Reconstruction of the Leubingen burial chamber

=== Mound and chamber ===
The earthen mound is 7 metres (23 ft) high and contains a burial chamber of 3.90 by 2.10 metres (12.8 by 6.9 ft) with a maximum height of 1.70 metres (5.6 ft).

The original height of the mound was around 8.5 metres (28 ft) and its diameter was 34 metres (112 ft). Around 210 cubic-meters of stones and 3,600 cubic-meters of earth were moved in its construction.

Inside the earthen mound is the burial Chamber, which has roughly the form of a hut/house of the time. It has a saddle-shaped roof made out of heavy oak beams covered with stones.

=== Contents of the grave ===
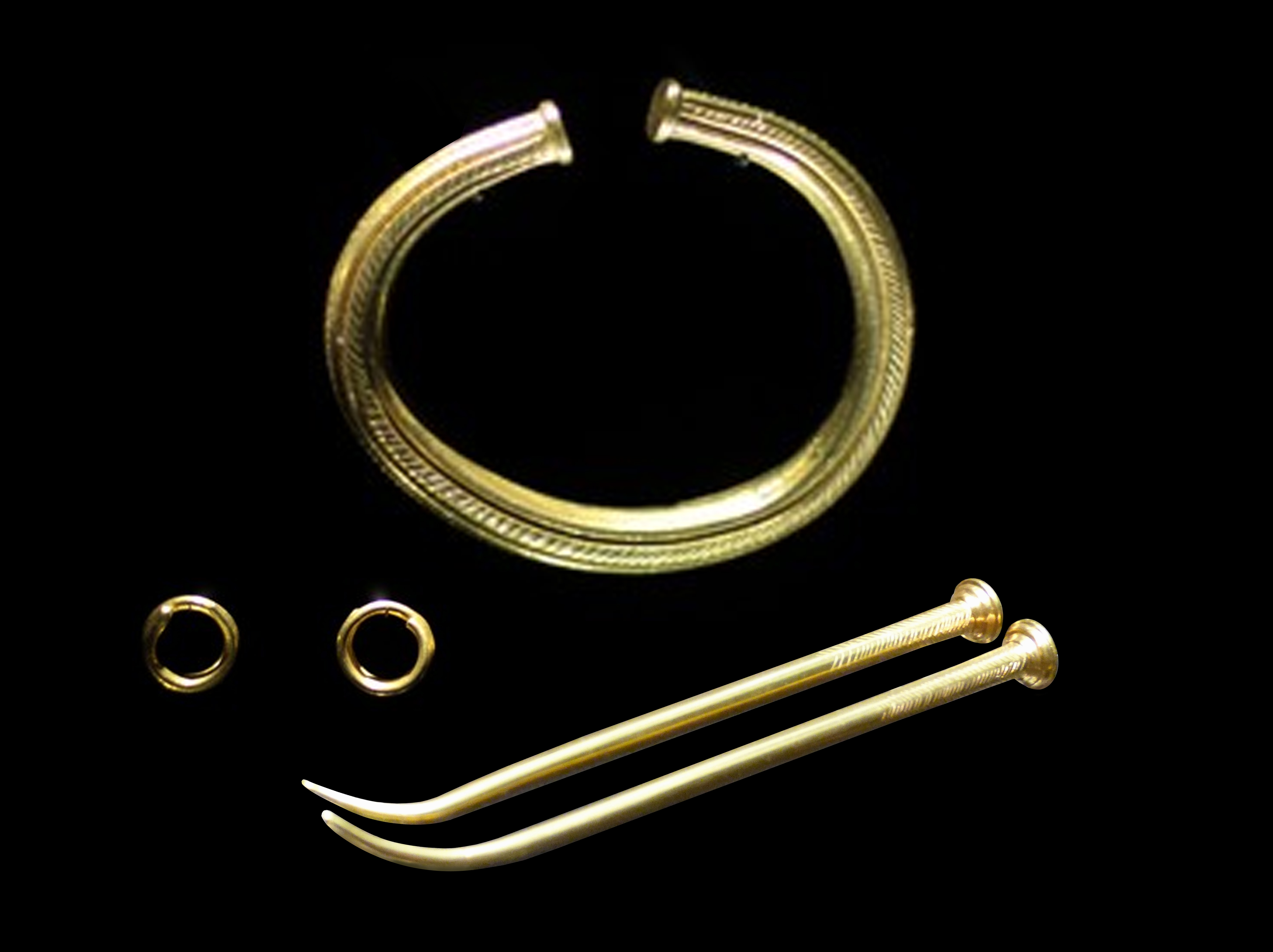
Gold artefacts from the Leubingen burial

In a central position lay the body of a man about 50 years old.

According to Klopfleisch's final report, draped over the man's loins at an angle of ca. 40° was the body of a young man. This was not mentioned in his earlier notes, however.

- Aside his right shoulder:
  - An open bracelet
  - Two pins
  - Two rings
  - A spiral made out of gold.
- At his feet:
  - A stone battle-hammer which was pierced
  - A rectangular stone (anvil?)
  - Two bronze edge-axes (axe with elevated edges to prevent it from moving too much on the handle it was attached to)
  - Three bronze chisels
  - Three bronze dagger blades which were placed in leather and oak bark scabbards
  - Also found there was the blade of a dagger (de:Stabdolch)
- In a corner of the burial chamber stood a large ceramic pot, with brown and black decorations, with little ears on the shoulder.

The findings are now part of the permanent exhibition of the Halle State Museum of Prehistory.

== Gallery ==
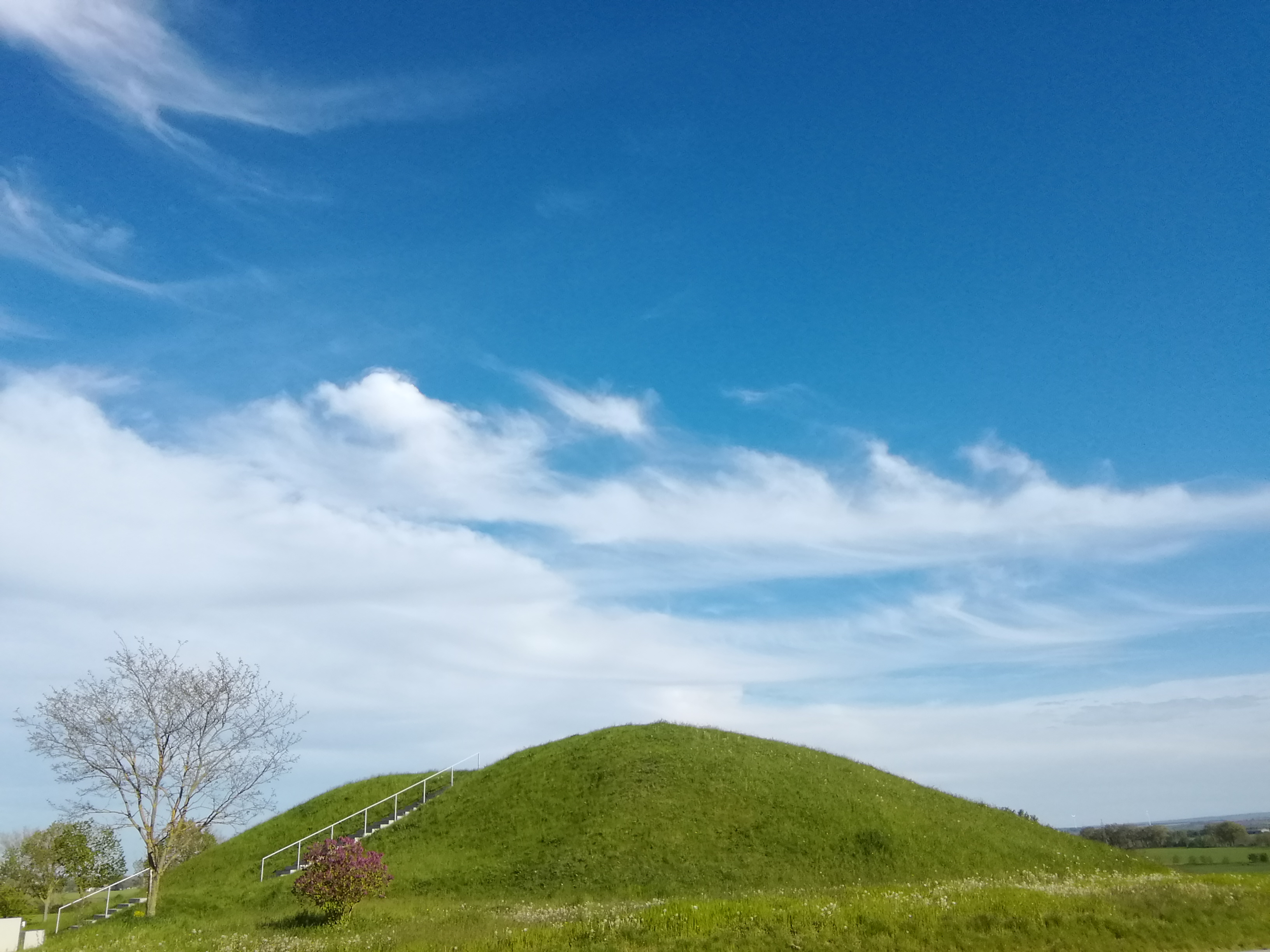
The Leubingen Tumulus

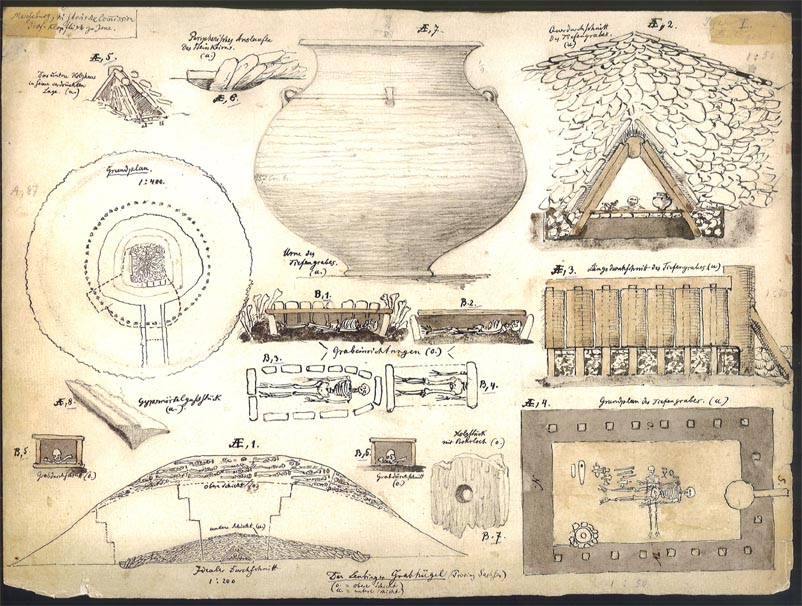
Illustration 1 from Klopfleisch's hand-drawn/-written report

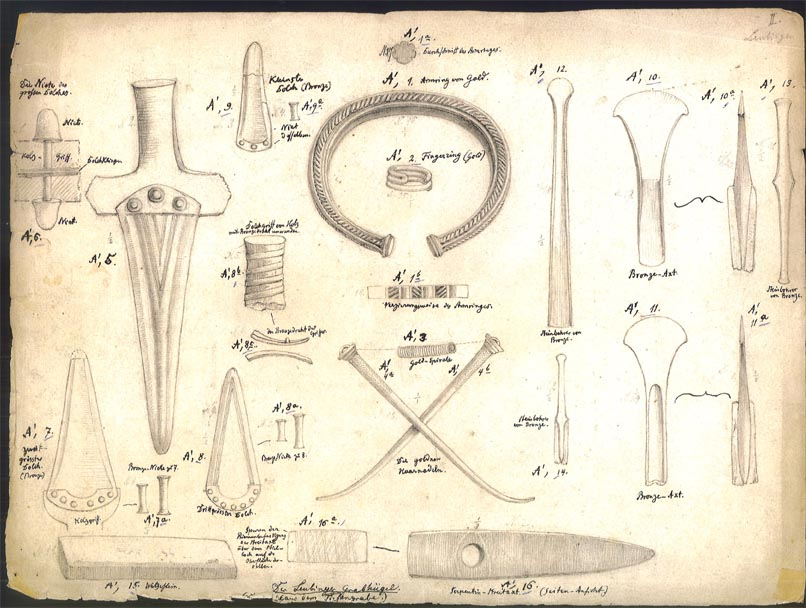
Illustration 2 from Klopfleisch's hand-drawn/-written report

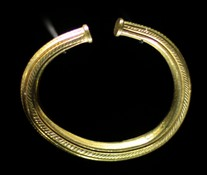
Gold armring

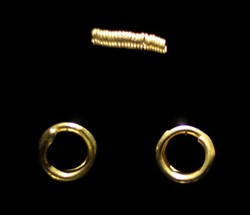
Gold rings and spiral

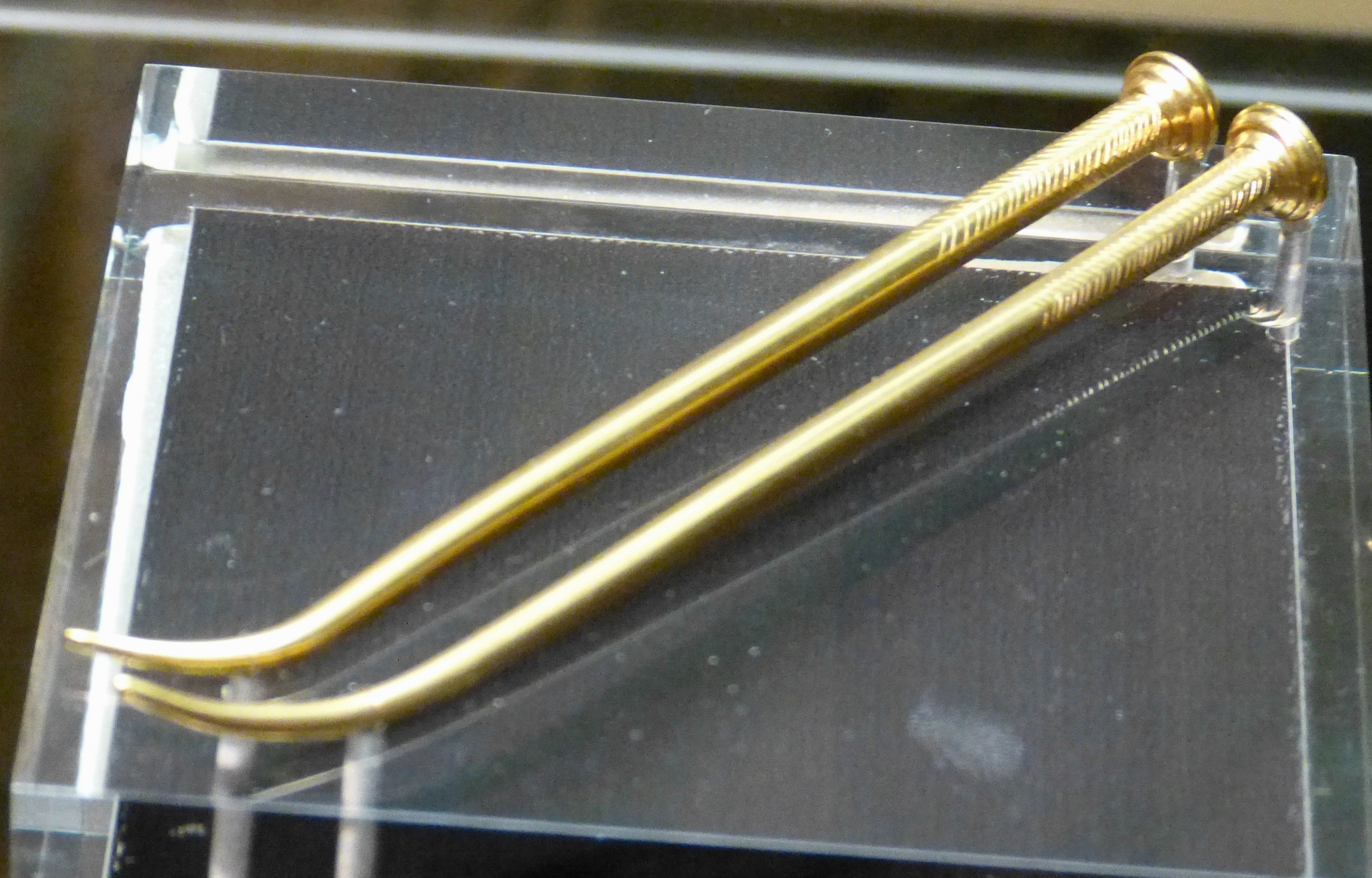
Gold pins

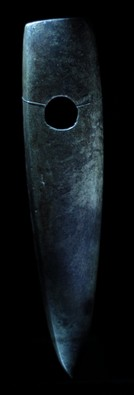
Massive stone axe, a relic from the 5th millennium BC

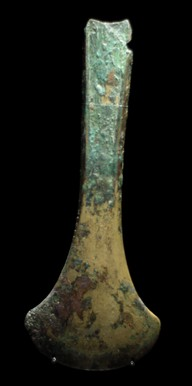
Bronze axe

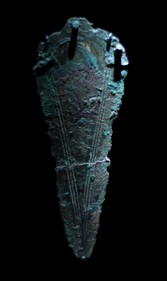
Bronze dagger

== Surroundings ==
Between the 8th and 11th century AD, the local (at the time Slavic) community established a cemetery of about 70 graves in and around this manmade hill.

== See also ==
- Grave of Helmsdorf
