= Lengefeld (Unstruttal) =

- Ortsteil of Unstruttal
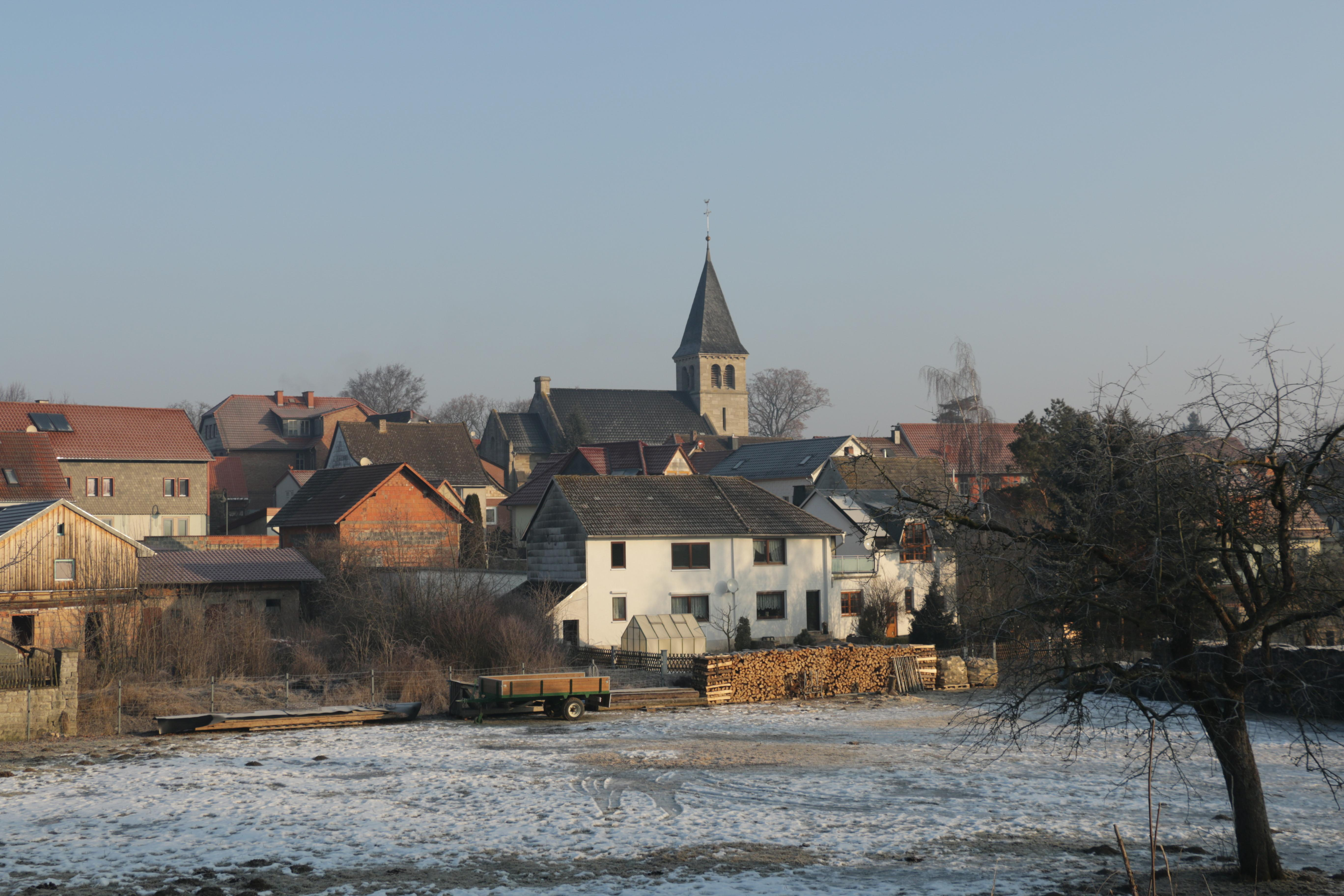

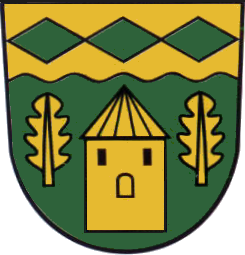
- Coat of arms
- Interactive map of Lengefeld
- Location within Germany Location within Thuringia
- Coordinates: 51°15′18″N 10°23′33″E
- Country: Germany
- State: Thuringia
- District: Unstrut-Hainich-Kreis
- Municipality: Unstruttal

Area
  - Total: 7.5 km^{2} (2.9 sq mi)
- Elevation: 360 m (1,180 ft)

Population (2020-12-31)
  - Total: 795
  - Density: 110/km^{2} (270/sq mi)
- Time zone: UTC+01:00 (CET)
  - Summer (DST): UTC+02:00 (CEST)
- Postal codes: 99976
- Dialling codes: 036023
- Vehicle registration: UH
- Website: Gemeinde Anrode

Lengefeld (German pronunciation: [ˈlɛŋəˌfɛlt]) is a village in the municipality of Unstruttal, Thuringia, Germany. A formerly independent municipality, it was merged into the new municipality Anrode in January 1997. On 1 January 2023, Anrode was disbanded and Lengefeld became part of the municipality Unstruttal.
