= Peter Albach =

German politician

Peter Albach (born 26 July 1956 in Sömmerda, Bezirk Erfurt) is a German politician and member of the CDU. From 2005 to 2009 he was a member of the Bundestag of Germany. He did not run for the federal elections in 2009. Since 1990, he has uninterruptedly served as the mayor of Weißensee, Thuringia.
