= Herbsleben =

- Municipality
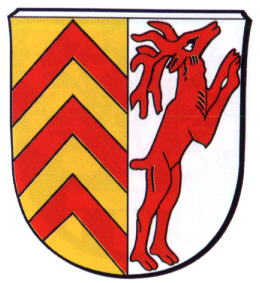
- Coat of arms

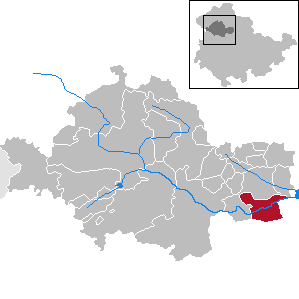
- Location of Herbsleben within Unstrut-Hainich-Kreis district
- Interactive map of Herbsleben
- Location within Germany Location within Thuringia
- Coordinates: 51°7′N 10°50′E
- Country: Germany
- State: Thuringia
- District: Unstrut-Hainich-Kreis

Government
  - Mayor (2024–30): Reinhard Mascher (CDU)

Area
  - Total: 25.02 km^{2} (9.66 sq mi)
- Elevation: 169 m (554 ft)

Population (2025-12-31)
  - Total: 2,781
  - Density: 111.2/km^{2} (287.9/sq mi)
- Time zone: UTC+01:00 (CET)
  - Summer (DST): UTC+02:00 (CEST)
- Postal codes: 99955
- Dialling codes: 036041
- Vehicle registration: UH
- Website: www.gemeinde-herbsleben.de

Herbsleben is a municipality in the Unstrut-Hainich-Kreis district of Thuringia, Germany.
