= Menteroda =

- Part of Unstruttal
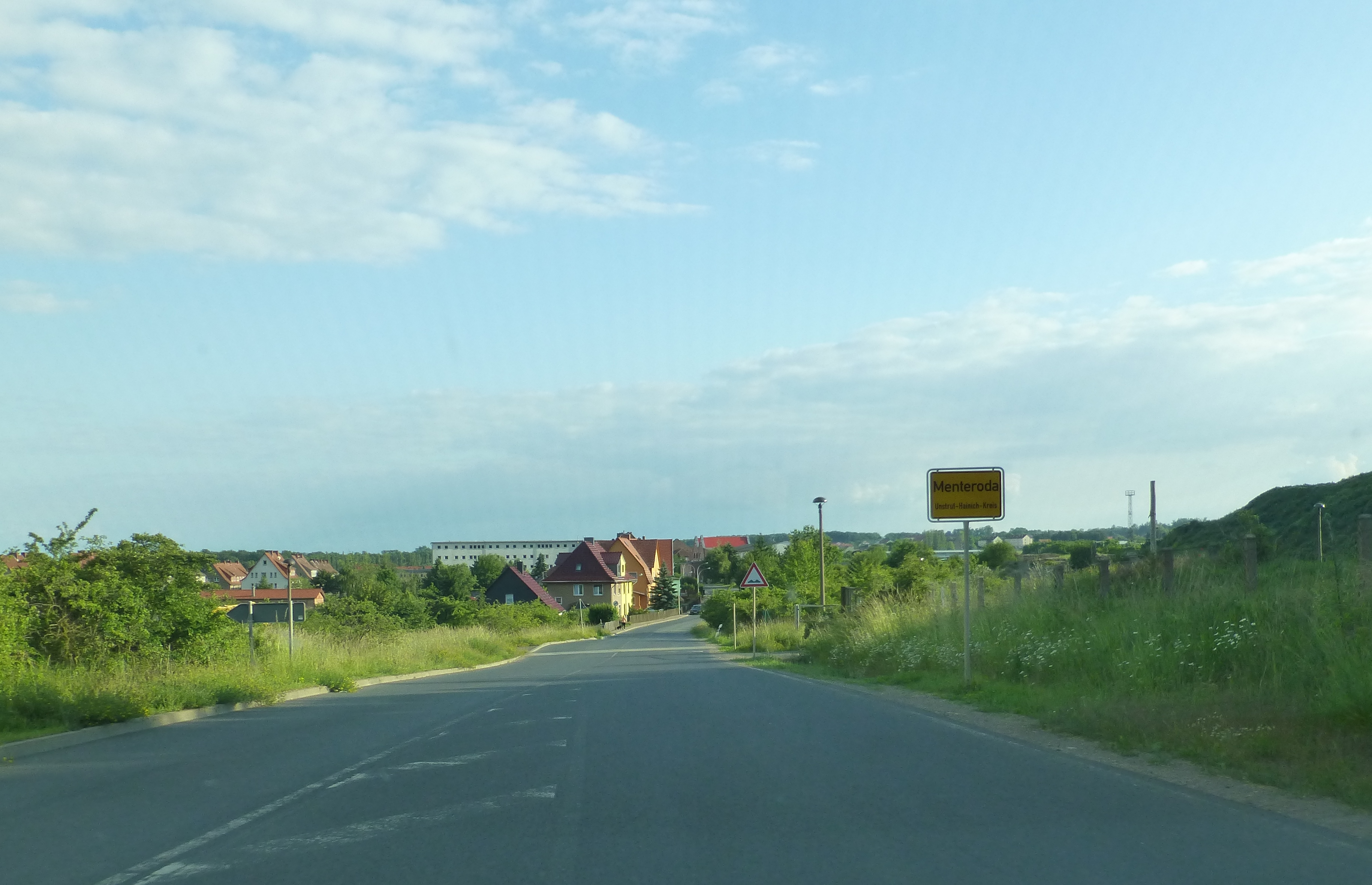
- Interactive map of Menteroda
- Location within Germany Location within Thuringia
- Coordinates: 51°17′N 10°33′E
- Country: Germany
- State: Thuringia
- District: Unstrut-Hainich-Kreis
- Municipality: Unstruttal

Area
  - Total: 27.35 km^{2} (10.56 sq mi)
- Elevation: 431 m (1,414 ft)

Population (2021-12-31)
  - Total: 1,863
  - Density: 68.12/km^{2} (176.4/sq mi)
- Time zone: UTC+01:00 (CET)
  - Summer (DST): UTC+02:00 (CEST)
- Postal codes: 99996
- Dialling codes: 036029
- Website: www.menteroda.de

Menteroda (German pronunciation: [mɛntəˈʁoːda]) is a village and a former municipality in the Unstrut-Hainich-Kreis district of Thuringia, Germany. On 1 January 2023 it became part of the municipality Unstruttal.

== History ==
Within the German Empire (1870-1918), Menteroda was part of the Duchy of Saxe-Coburg and Gotha.
