= Jürgen Pohl =

German politician

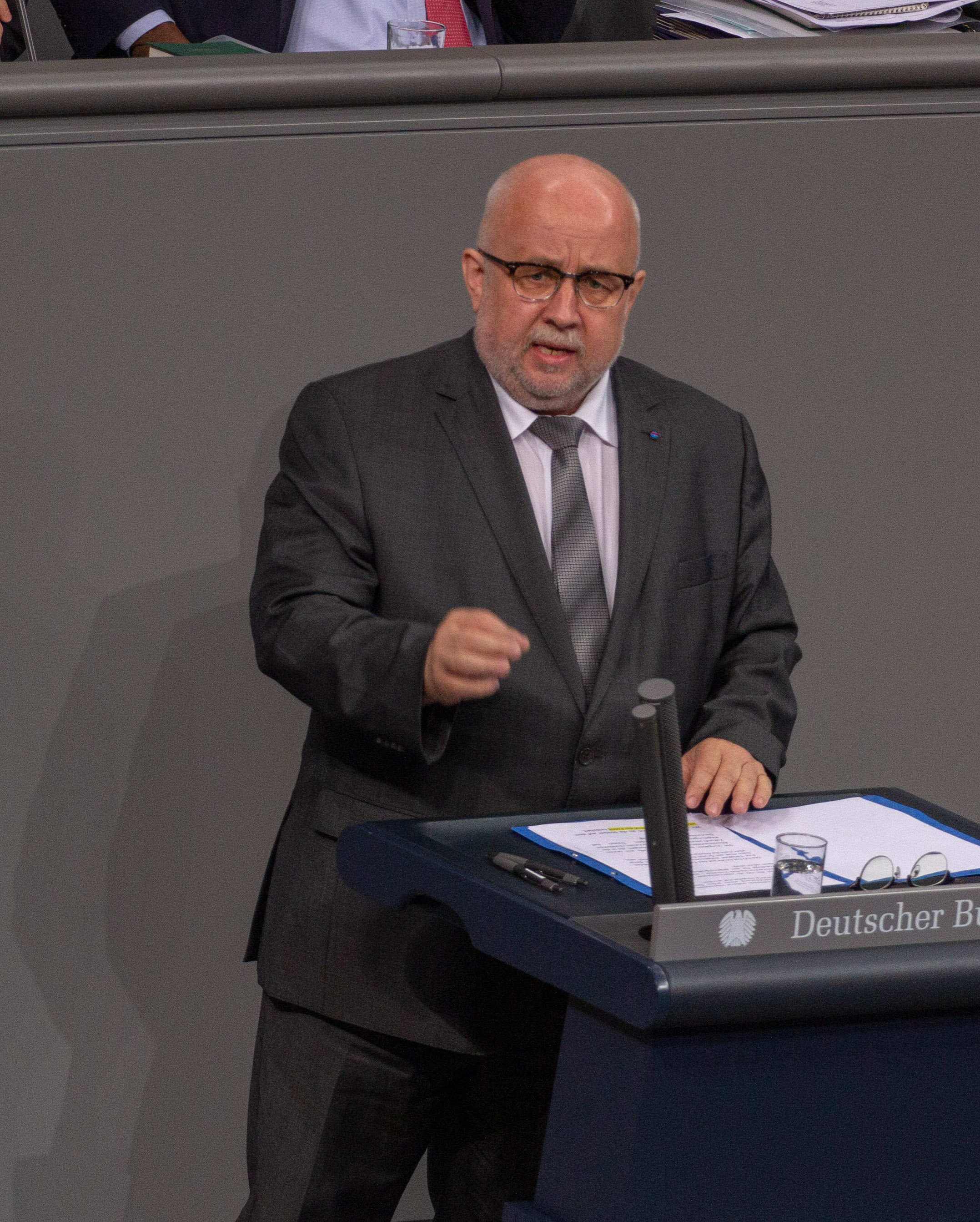
- Jürgen Pohl in 2019

Member of the Bundestag
- Incumbent
- Assumed office 2017

Personal details
- Born: 7 January 1964 (age 62) Magdeburg, East Germany (now Germany)
- Party: AfD

Jürgen Pohl (born 7 January 1964) is a German politician. Born in Magdeburg, Saxony-Anhalt, he represents Alternative for Germany (AfD). Jürgen Pohl has served as a member of the Bundestag from the state of Thuringia since 2017.

== Life ==
He became member of the Bundestag after the 2017 German federal election. He is a member of the Committee for Labour and Social Affairs.
