= Ralph Lenkert =

German politician (born 1967)

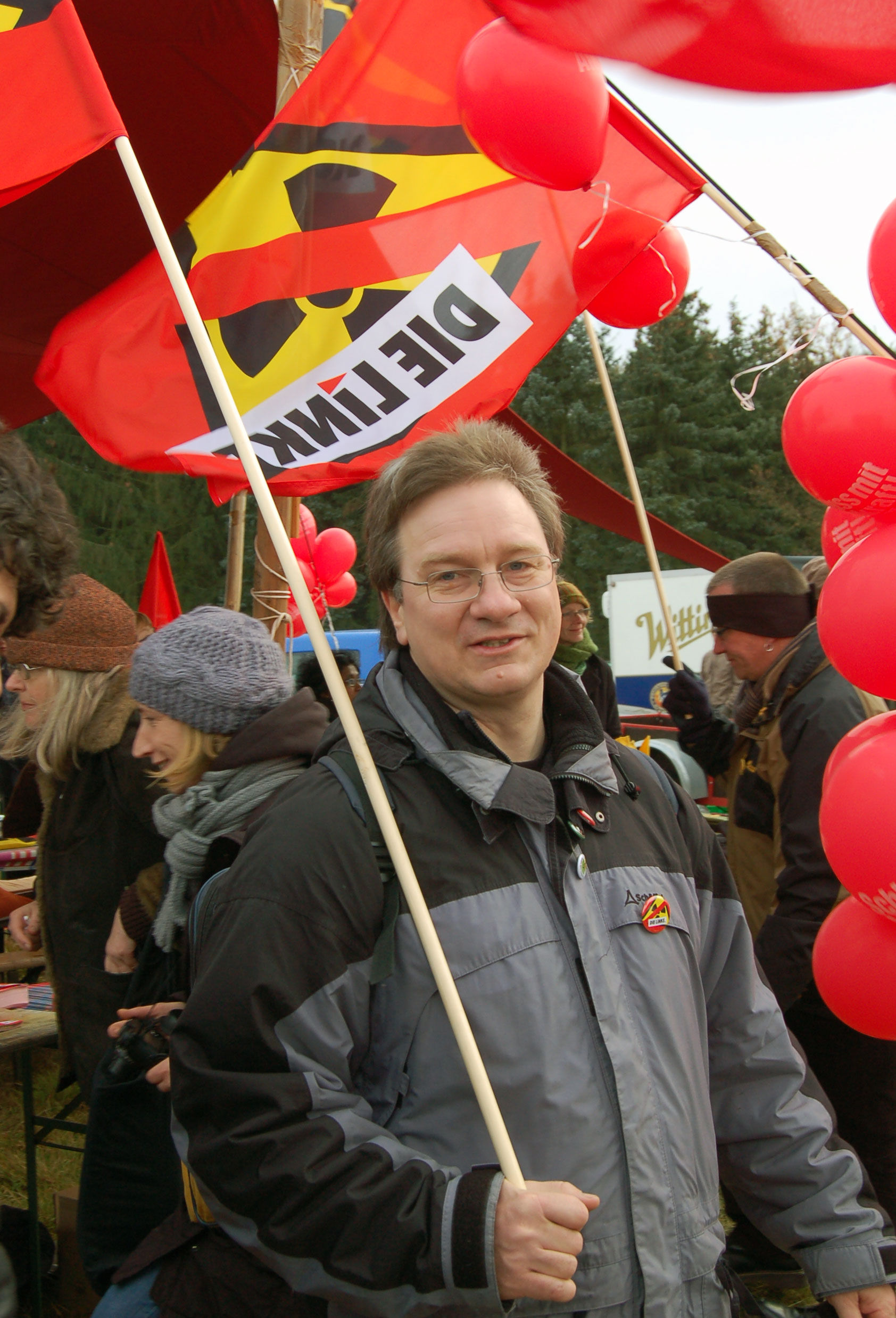
- Ralph Lenkert in 2011

Member of the Bundestag
- Incumbent
- Assumed office 2009

Personal details
- Born: 9 May 1967 (age 58) Apolda, East Germany (now Germany)
- Party: The Left
- Occupation: Toolmaker

Ralph Lenkert (born 9 May 1967) is a German politician. Born in Apolda, Thuringia, he represents The Left. Ralph Lenkert has served as a member of the Bundestag from the state of Thuringia since 2009.

== Life ==
Lenkert grew up in Jena. He graduated from the polytechnic secondary school in 1983 and then trained as a toolmaker at Carl Zeiss in Jena. From 1986 to 1991 he worked in this profession at Zeiss, interrupted by 1.5 years of basic military service at the NVA. In 1990 he became a member of the IG Metall trade union. From 1991 onwards, he worked in various companies as a toolmaker and senior employee. From 1991 to 1995 Lenkert completed a distance learning course with a technical college degree as a state-certified technician specialising in mechanical engineering. From 2002 to 2006, he worked again for Zeiss as a technologist; among other things he was responsible for outsourcing jobs to China against his political convictions. He became a member of the Bundestag after the 2009 German federal election. He is a member of the Committee on the Environment, Nature Conservation and Nuclear Safety.
