= Unstruttal =

- Municipality
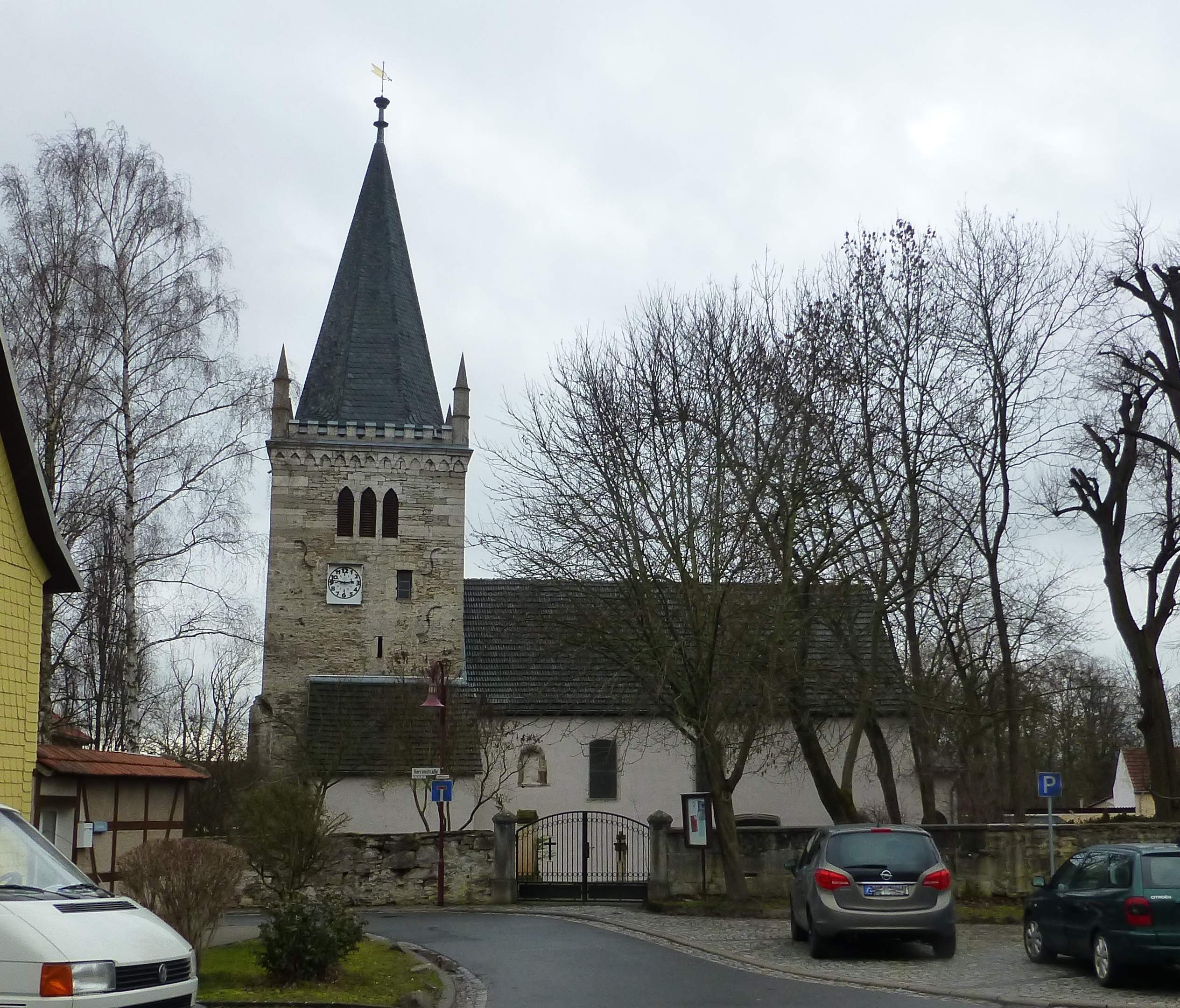
- Saint Vitus Church in Ammern

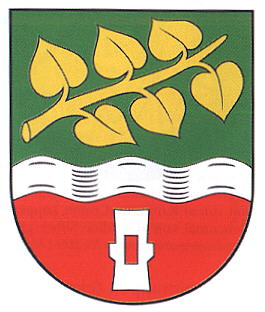
- Coat of arms

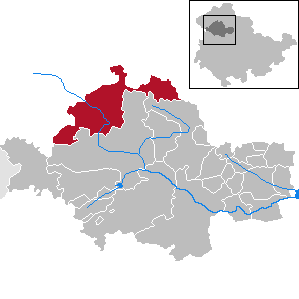
- Location of Unstruttal within Unstrut-Hainich-Kreis district
- Interactive map of Unstruttal
- Location within Germany Location within Thuringia
- Coordinates: 51°14′N 10°27′E
- Country: Germany
- State: Thuringia
- District: Unstrut-Hainich-Kreis

Government
  - Mayor (2019–25): Michael Hartung (Ind.)

Area
  - Total: 100.65 km^{2} (38.86 sq mi)
- Elevation: 229 m (751 ft)

Population (2025-12-31)
  - Total: 5,993
  - Density: 59.54/km^{2} (154.2/sq mi)
- Time zone: UTC+01:00 (CET)
  - Summer (DST): UTC+02:00 (CEST)
- Postal codes: 99974
- Dialling codes: 03601
- Vehicle registration: UH
- Website: gemeinde-unstruttal.de

Unstruttal (German pronunciation: [ˈʊnʃtʁʊtˌtaːl] or [ˈʊnstʁuːtˌtaːl], lit. 'Unstrut Valley') is a municipality in the Unstrut-Hainich-Kreis district of Thuringia, Germany. It was created in September 1995 by the merger of the former municipalities Ammern, Dachrieden, Eigenrode, Horsmar, Kaisershagen and Reiser. In January 2023 Unstruttal absorbed the former municipality Menteroda, the villages Dörna and Lengefeld from the former municipality Anrode, and Zaunröden from the former municipality Dünwald.
