= Johannes Selle =

German politician

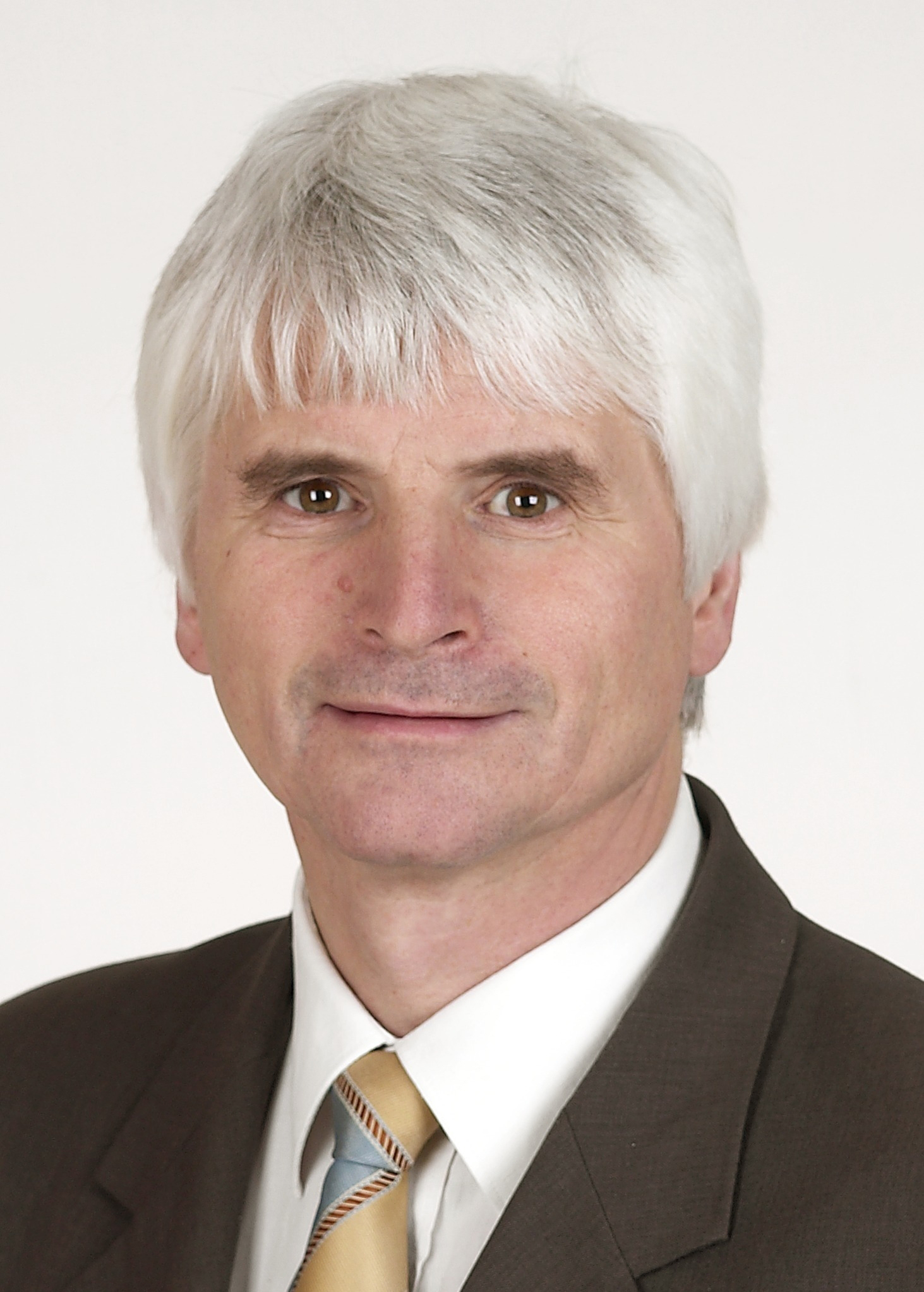
- Johannes Selle in 2011

Member of the Bundestag
- In office 2009–2021

Personal details
- Born: 13 January 1956 (age 70) Bad Lobenstein, East Germany (now Germany)
- Party: CDU

Johannes Selle (born 13 January 1956) is a German politician of the Christian Democratic Union (CDU) who served as a member of the Bundestag from the state of Thuringia from 1994 to 1998 and again from 2009 to 2021.

== Political career ==
Selle became a member of the Bundestag in the 2009 German federal election. He was a member of the Committee on Culture and Media and the Committee on Economic Cooperation and Development.

Ahead of the 2021 elections, Selle failed to win his party's support for another candidacy in his district; he was succeeded by Mike Mohring as the CDU candidate for the election.
