= Manfred Grund =

German politician (born 1955)

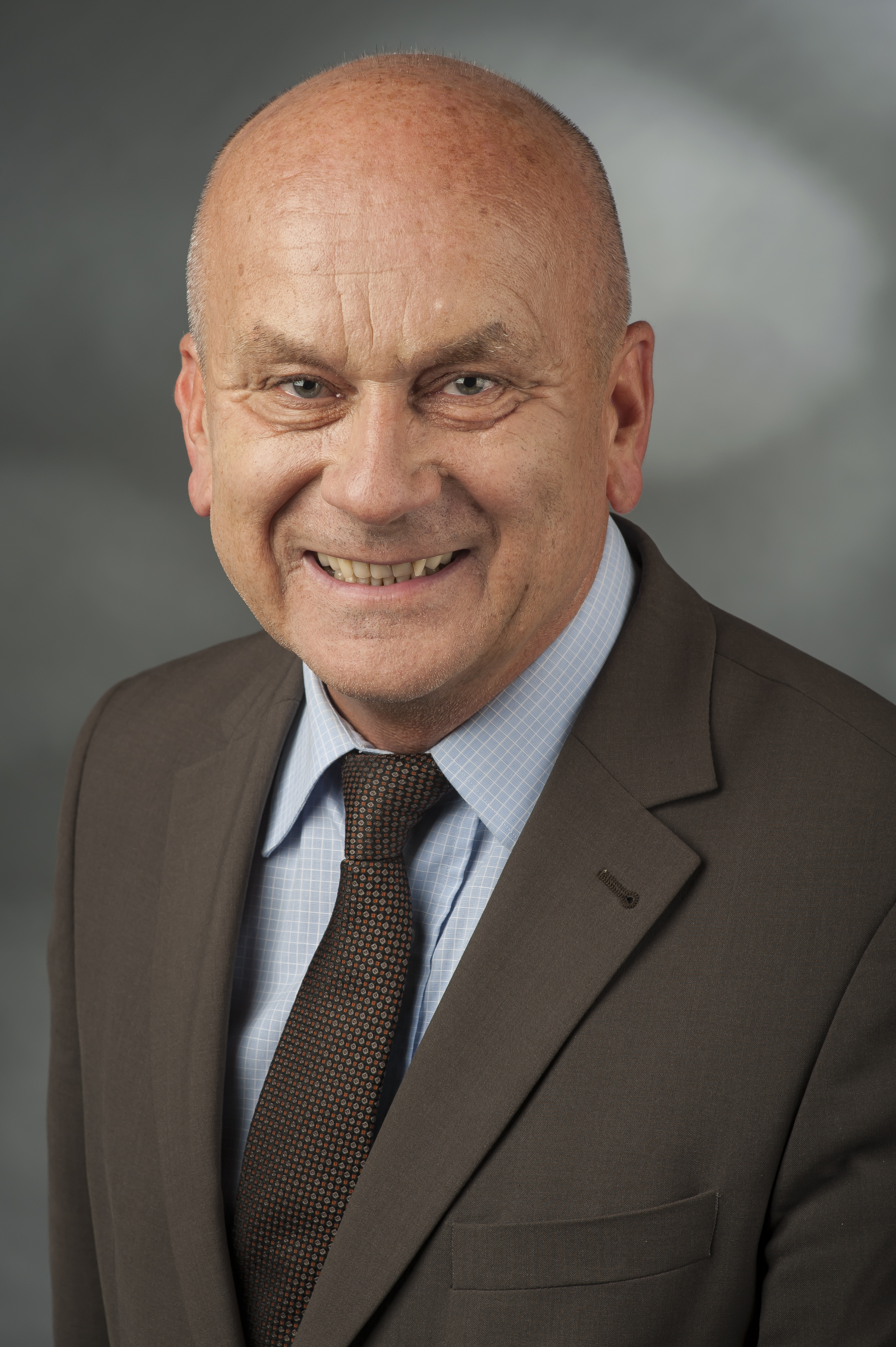

Parliamentary secretary

Personal details
- Born: 3 July 1955 (age 71) Zeitz, Bezirk Halle, East Germany
- Citizenship: German
- Party: Christian Democratic Union (CDU)
- Education: Dresden University of Technology
- Occupation: Politician
- Profession: Electrical Engineer
- Committees: Council of Elders; Committee on Foreign Affairs
- Website: www.manfred-grund.de

Manfred Grund (born 3 July 1955) is a German politician of the Christian Democratic Union (CDU).

== Early life, education and career ==
Manfred Grund was born 3 July 1955 in Zeitz, East Germany (GDR). After earning his Abitur he worked as a turbine engineer at the State Coal Mine in Deuben before doing his military service from 1974 to 1975.

Grund earned a diploma degree (Dipl.-Ing.) in Electrical Engineering from the Dresden University of Technology in 1980. From 1980 to 1990 he worked as a specialist engineer with the Erfurt Public Utility Works at Bleicherode.

== Political career ==
Without previous political affiliation Grund entered politics in the wake of the 1989 revolution in the GDR, in the course of which he acted as speaker of the Heiligenstadt people's movement. In January 1990 he joined the Christian Democratic Union and assumed various positions with the CDU in the Eichsfeld county and the state of Thuringia.

From 1990 to 1994 Grund served as head of the Heiligenstadt district administration authority.

In 1994 Grund was first elected to the German Bundestag for Nordhausen – Worbis – Heiligenstadt in Thuringia, a seat he has held ever since (renamed as Eichsfeld – Nordhausen – Kyffhäuserkreis in 2017).

Grund has served as parliamentary secretary of the CDU/CSU parliamentary group and as chairman of the Thuringian Committee of the CDU/CSU parliamentary group since 1998.

In October 2024, Grund announced, that he will not seeking re-election for Bundestag.

== Current committee assignments ==
Council of Elders
Committee on Foreign Affairs
Inter-Parliamentary Union (deputy member)
Parliamentary assembly of the Organization for Security and Co-operation in Europe (OSCE)

== Chairmanships ==
Thuringian Committee of the CDU/CSU parliamentary group in the German Bundestag
German-Central Asian parliamentary group

== Electoral history ==
Electoral district 296 Nordhausen – Worbis – Heiligenstadt, 1994 German federal election
- Manfred Grund – 51.4%

Electoral district 190 Eichsfeld – Nordhausen, 1998 German federal election
- Manfred Grund – 40.1%

Electoral district 190 Eichsfeld – Nordhausen, 2002 German federal election
- Manfred Grund – 41.3%

Electoral district 190 Eichsfeld – Nordhausen – Unstrut-Hainich-Kreis I, 2005 German federal election
- Manfred Grund – 37.4%

Electoral district 189 Eichsfeld – Nordhausen – Unstrut-Hainich-Kreis I, 2009 German federal election
- Manfred Grund – 43.0%

Electoral district 189 Eichsfeld – Nordhausen – Unstrut-Hainich-Kreis I, 2013 German federal election
- Manfred Grund – 49.6%

Electoral district 189 Eichsfeld – Nordhausen – Kyffhäuserkreis, 2017 German federal election
- Manfred Grund – 38.0%

== Personal life ==
Grund is a member of the Roman Catholic Church. He and his wife reside in Heiligenstadt, Thuringia.
