= Sömmerda =

- Town
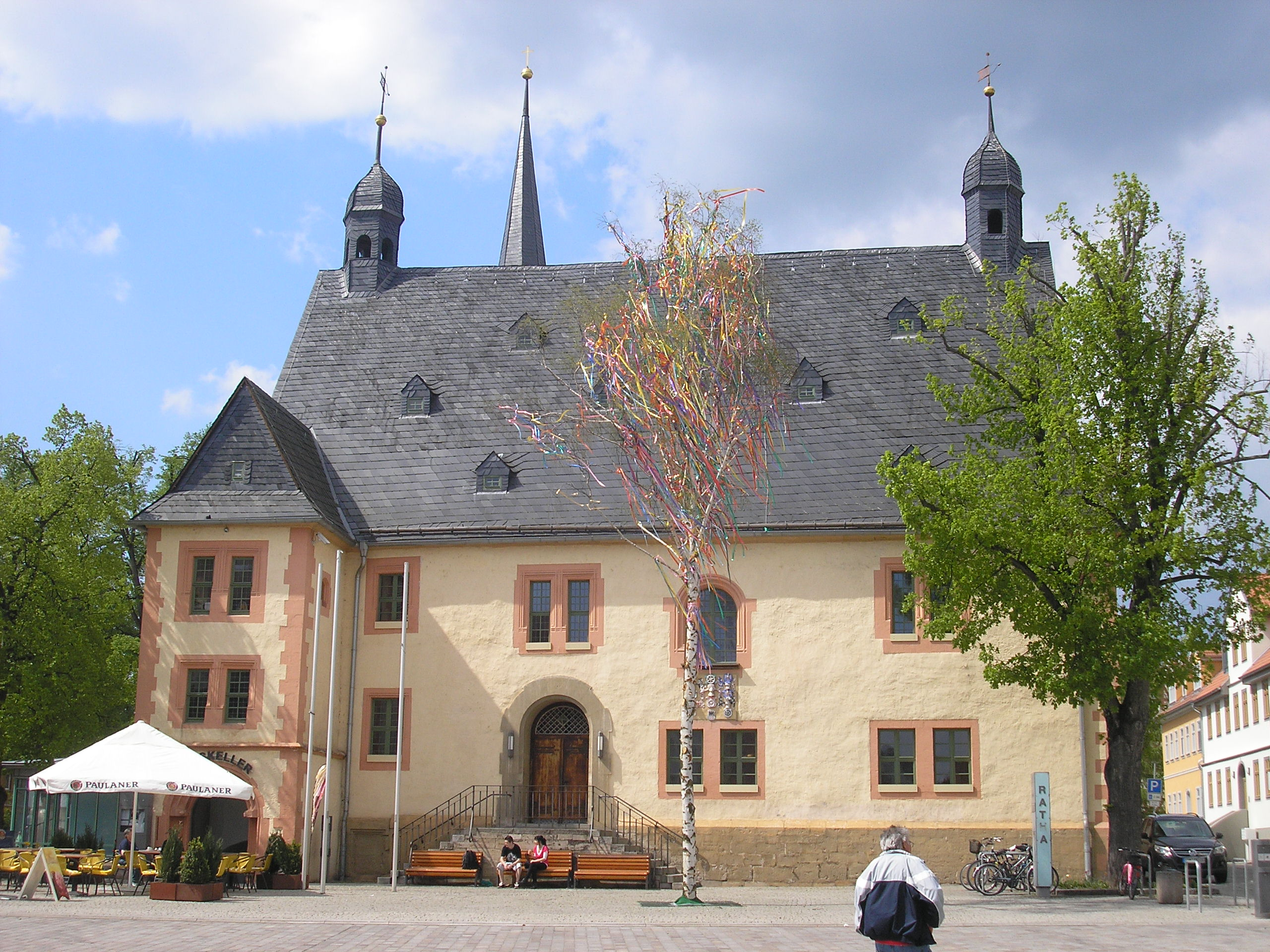
- Town hall

- Coat of arms

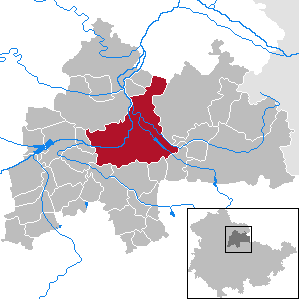
- Location of Sömmerda within Sömmerda district
- Interactive map of Sömmerda
- Location within Germany Location within Thuringia
- Coordinates: 51°9′42″N 11°7′1″E
- Country: Germany
- State: Thuringia
- District: Sömmerda

Government
  - Mayor (2024–30): Ralf Hauboldt (Left)

Area
  - Total: 87.56 km^{2} (33.81 sq mi)
- Elevation: 130–140 m (430–460 ft)

Population (2025-12-31)
  - Total: 18,503
  - Density: 211.3/km^{2} (547.3/sq mi)
- Time zone: UTC+01:00 (CET)
  - Summer (DST): UTC+02:00 (CEST)
- Postal codes: 99601–99610
- Dialling codes: 03634
- Vehicle registration: SÖM
- Website: www.soemmerda.de

Sömmerda (German pronunciation: [ˈzœmɐda]) is a town near Erfurt in Thuringia, Germany, on the Unstrut river. It is the capital of the district of Sömmerda.

== History ==
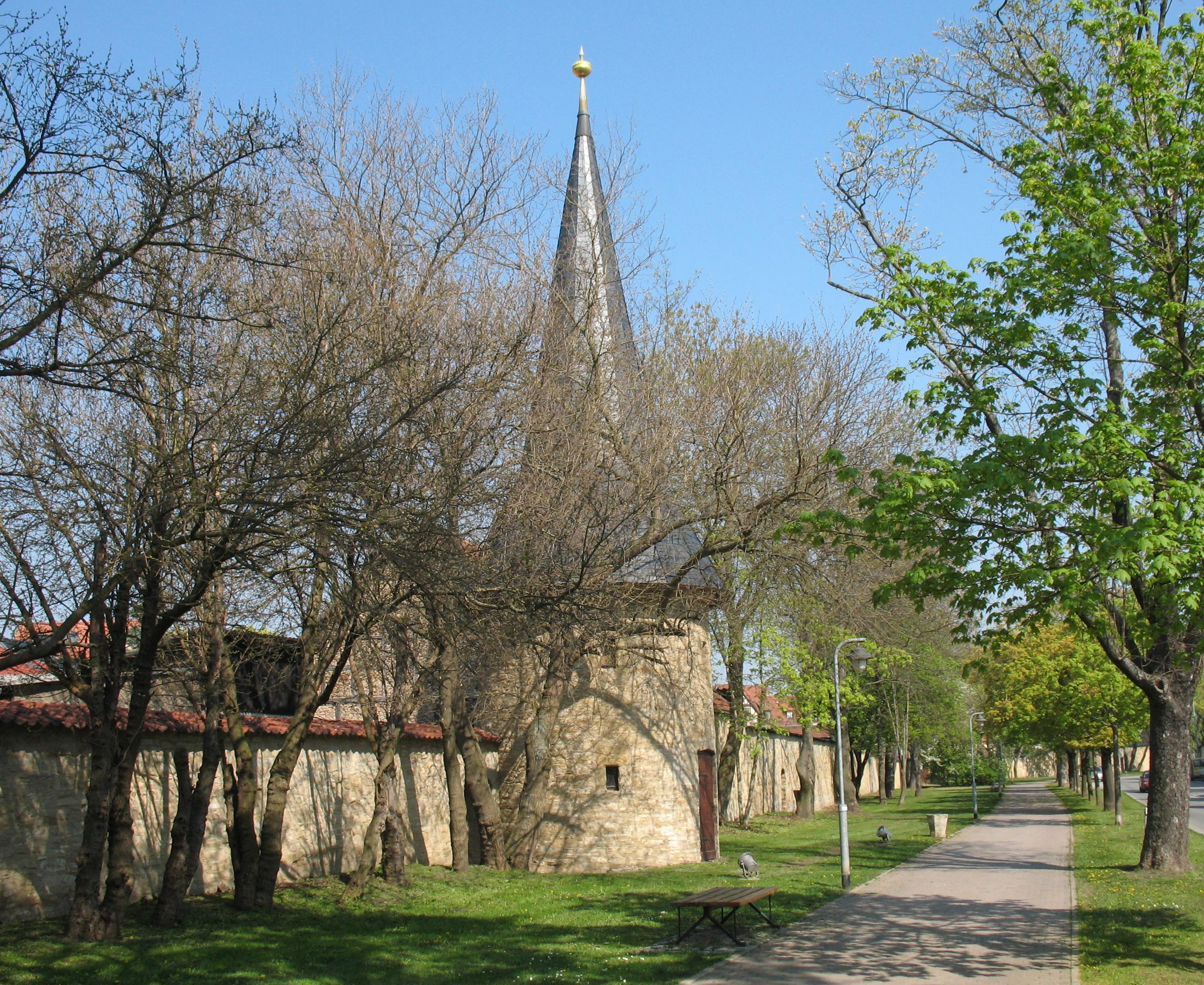
City wall

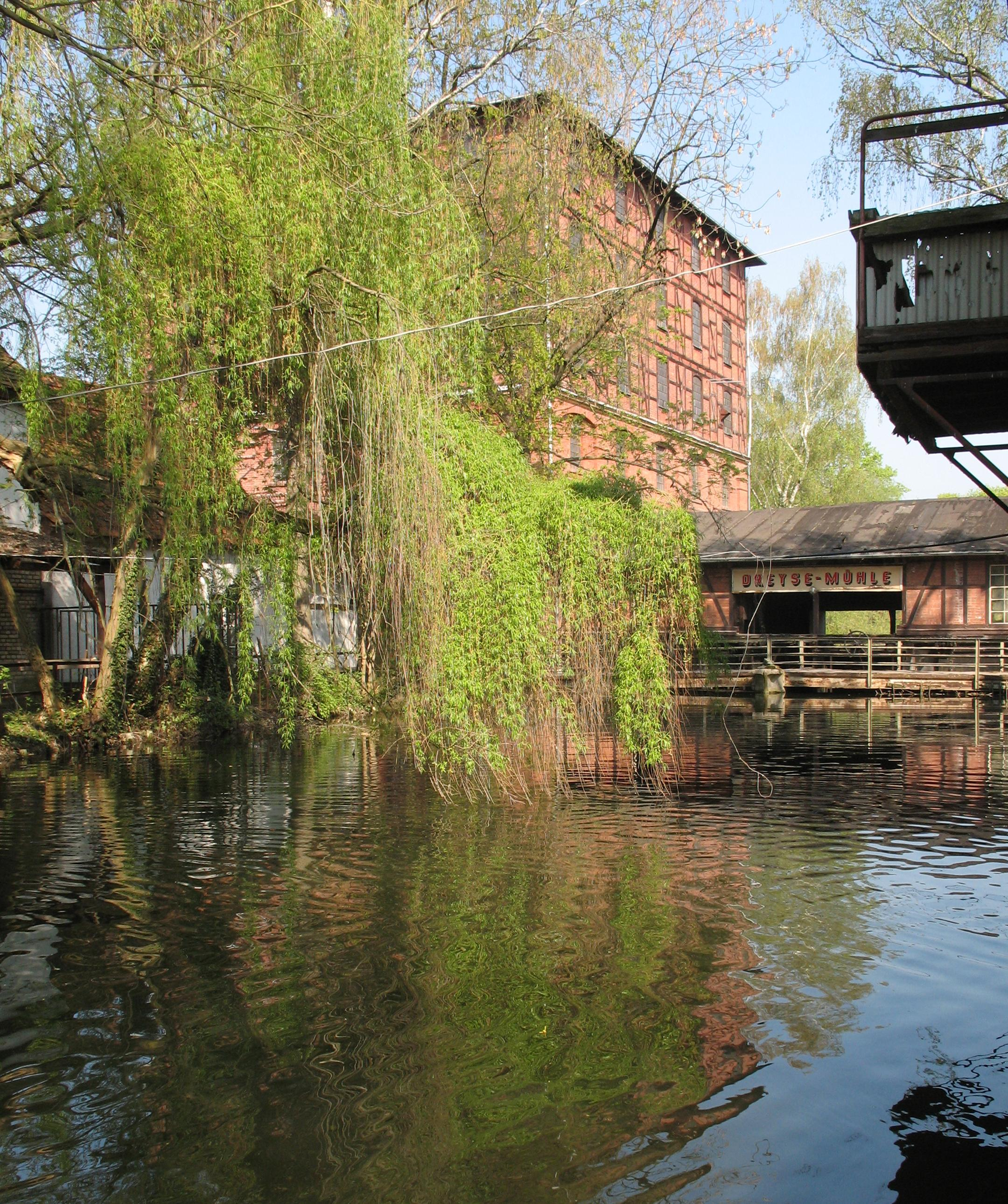
Watermill

Archeological digs in the area that is now Sömmerda, formerly Leubingen, have uncovered prominently buried human remains dating to around 2000 BCE. One such burial of an individual, dubbed the "king of Leubingen" is the Leubingen tumulus.

Sömmerda was first mentioned in official documents in 876 CE. It probably became a town in about 1350 but there are no existing records of the event. One town gate, dating from 1395, and six towers from the old town walls are still standing.

During the Thirty Years' War (1618–1648) Sömmerda was at the heart of military activity, and soldiers from both sides ransacked the town, halving the population.

In 1840, Johann Nikolaus von Dreyse invented the needle gun and a firearms factory was founded in the town. In 1919 the Rheinmetall company took over the factory, later called Rheinmetall-Borsig, at first to produce automotive parts. Initially it concentrated with only little success on carburettors, then in 1925 an ambitious new manager, the engineer Fritz Faudi, took over and a new type of cardan joint was developed, which became extremely popular. The Rheinmetall-Faudi system was a well-known name, and the Sömmerda works were the largest producer in Germany.

In April 1921 the factory returned to arms production, going against the post-war regulations which banned it from producing fuses. From October 1922, the factory produced the total quantity of fuses allowed in Germany by the Allies and also began producing the new MG30 machine gun under the direction of Louis Schmeisser.

In September 1944 Rheinmetall-Borsig became an external camp for Buchenwald concentration camp. As many as 1,294 female prisoners were made to do forced labour there, most of them aged between 16 and 60, many Jews from Hungary. As well as continuing to produce cardan shafts, the women also helped make parts for armoured vehicles used in the war, as well as manufacturing arms; two new workshops were built for this in 1944 and 1945. The SS evacuated the camp in early April 1945, sending its prisoners and SS overseers on a death march, which ended near Plzeň, Czechoslovakia.

Today a special cemetery in Sömmerda contains graves and a memorial to the camp inmates, forced labourers and war prisoners.

On April 11, 1945, Americans arriving in Sömmerda found the Rheinmetall plant still untouched by bombs, but abandoned by its managers. Days later Thuringia was occupied by the Russians, who recommenced production by the next month, employing between 1,000 and 1,500 workers. Production went back to automotive parts until the 1950s when office machinery began to be produced. Later Rheinmetall-Borsig became today's Rheinmetall DeTec AG.

Following the Second World War, the Sömmerda factory then found itself in the newly formed East Germany, with development and production now continuing as a state-run enterprise, but using the pre-war Rheinmetall name and logo. In 1957, a group of young electronics engineers under the collective direction of Heinz Skolaude brought Volkseigener Betrieb Büromaschinenwerk Sömmerda into being and into the age of electronics. In 1960 the name was changed to "Supermetall" and then in 1962 to the "Soemtron" name, when they exhibited at the Leipzig trade Fair of that year an electronic Fakturierautomaten (Automatic Invoicing machine) - the model EFA 380. 1963 saw the next model the EFA 381 with magnetic core memory.

In July 2018, the former municipality of Schillingstedt was merged into Sömmerda.

== Population development ==
Historical Population 1839 - 2015

Year	Pop.	±%
1839	2,591	—
1890	4,583	+76.9%
1933	8,490	+85.2%
1939	11,781	+38.8%
1946^{1}	13,932	+18.3%
1950^{2}	13,568	−2.6%
1960	13,811	+1.8%
1981	22,821	+65.2%
1984	23,455	+2.8%
1994	24,902	+6.2%
1995	24,454	−1.8%

Year	Pop.	±%
1996	23,897	−2.3%
1997	23,403	−2.1%
1998	22,861	−2.3%
1999	22,397	−2.0%
2000	21,977	−1.9%
2001	21,585	−1.8%
2002	21,348	−1.1%
2003	21,102	−1.2%
2004	21,010	−0.4%
2005	20,770	−1.1%
2006	20,671	−0.5%

Year	Pop.	±%
2007	20,435	−1.1%
2008	20,262	−0.8%
2009	20,005	−1.3%
2010	19,786	−1.1%
2011	19,374	−2.1%
2012	19,215	−0.8%
2013	19,065	−0.8%
2014	18,973	−0.5%
2015	18,996	+0.1%

Source: Source of figures from 1994: Thüringer Landesamt für Statistik

== Transport links ==
Sömmerda station lies on the Sangerhausen–Erfurt railway.

== Coat of arms ==
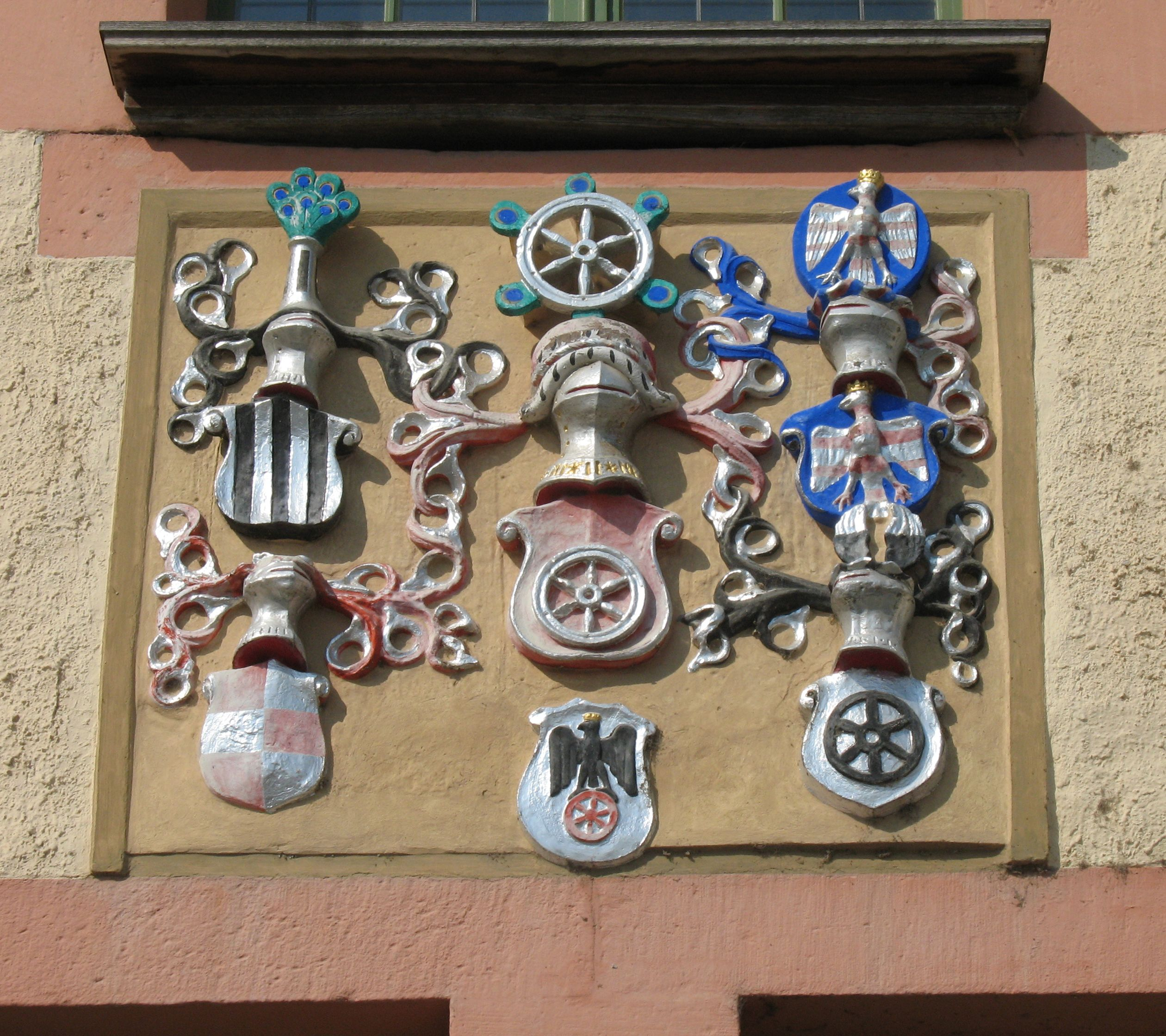

The town coat of arms is a shield with the field divided horizontally; the upper field has a black eagle with a red tongue, looking to the right. The lower field is red with a silver six-spoked wheel.

== International relations ==
Sömmerda is twinned with:

- Böblingen, Germany, since 1988
- Kėdainiai, Lithuania, since 1989
