= Hildebrandshausen/Lengenfeld unterm Stein =

Coordinates: 51°13′N 10°13′E

Hildebrandshausen/Lengenfeld unterm Stein is a former Verwaltungsgemeinschaft in the district of Unstrut-Hainich-Kreis in Thuringia, Germany. The seat of the Verwaltungsgemeinschaft was in Lengenfeld unterm Stein. It was disbanded in December 2011.

The Verwaltungsgemeinschaft Hildebrandshausen/Lengenfeld unterm Stein consists of the following municipalities:

1. Hildebrandshausen
2. Lengenfeld unterm Stein
3. Rodeberg
