= Anrode =

- Municipality
- Interactive map of Anrode
- Location within Germany Location within Thuringia
- Coordinates: 51°15′35″N 10°18′29″E
- Country: Germany
- State: Thuringia
- District: Unstrut-Hainich-Kreis
- Disbanded: 2023

Area
  - Total: 52.73 km^{2} (20.36 sq mi)
- Elevation: 372 m (1,220 ft)

Population (2021-12-31)
  - Total: 3,138
  - Density: 59.51/km^{2} (154.1/sq mi)
- Time zone: UTC+01:00 (CET)
  - Summer (DST): UTC+02:00 (CEST)
- Postal codes: 99976
- Dialling codes: 036023
- Website: Gemeinde Anrode

Anrode (German pronunciation: [anˈʁoːdə]) is a former municipality in the Unstrut-Hainich-Kreis district of Thuringia, Germany. It was created in January 1997 by the merger of the former municipalities Lengefeld, Bickenriede, Dörna, Hollenbach and Zella. On 1 January 2023 it was disbanded, and its constituent communities were distributed over 3 other municipalities:

- Bickenriede and Zella to Dingelstädt
- Hollenbach to Mühlhausen
- Dörna and Lengefeld to Unstruttal

== Notable people ==
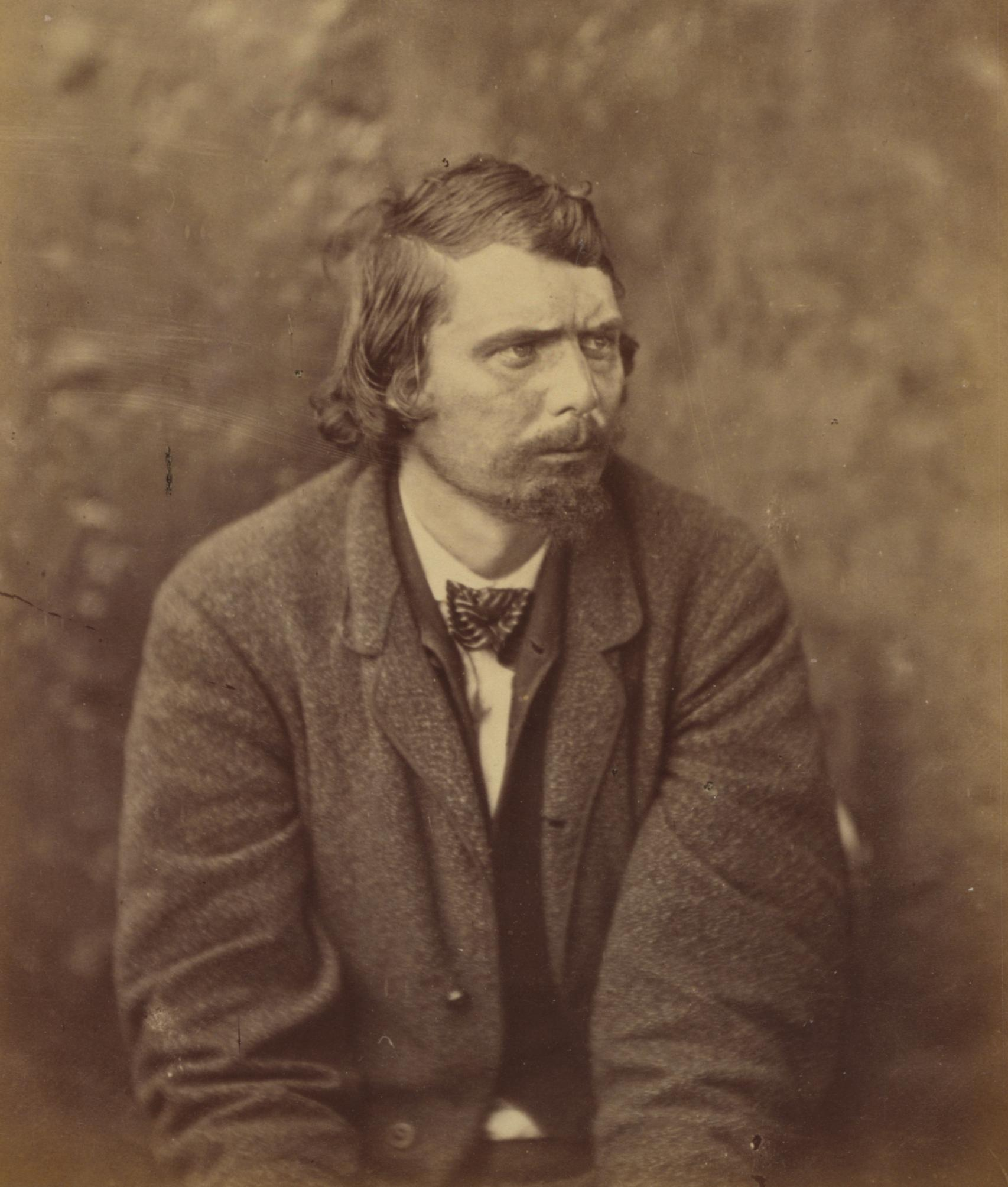
George Atzerodt

- Johann Friedrich Wender (1655-1729), organ builder, born in Dörna, had his workshop in Mühlhausen
- George Atzerodt (1835-1865), conspirator of the assassination on Abraham Lincoln, born in Dörna
- Karl Künstler (1901-probably 1945), SS Obersturmbannführer, camp commander of the Flossenbürg concentration camp, born in Zella
