= Dünwald =

- Municipality
- Coat of arms
- Interactive map of Dünwald
- Location within Germany Location within Thuringia
- Coordinates: 51°19′N 10°26′E
- Country: Germany
- State: Thuringia
- District: Unstrut-Hainich-Kreis
- Disbanded: 2023

Area
  - Total: 28.89 km^{2} (11.15 sq mi)
- Elevation: 449 m (1,473 ft)

Population (2021-12-31)
  - Total: 2,257
  - Density: 78.12/km^{2} (202.3/sq mi)
- Time zone: UTC+01:00 (CET)
  - Summer (DST): UTC+02:00 (CEST)
- Postal codes: 99976
- Dialling codes: 036076
- Website: www.duenwald.de

Dünwald (German pronunciation: [ˈdyːnˌvalt]) is a former municipality in the Unstrut-Hainich-Kreis district of Thuringia, Germany. It was created in January 1994 by the merger of the former municipalities Zaunröden, Beberstedt and Hüpstedt. On 1 January 2023 it was disbanded, and its constituent communities were distributed over 2 other municipalities:

- Beberstedt and Hüpstedt to Dingelstädt
- Zaunröden to Unstruttal
