= Kersten Steinke =

German politician

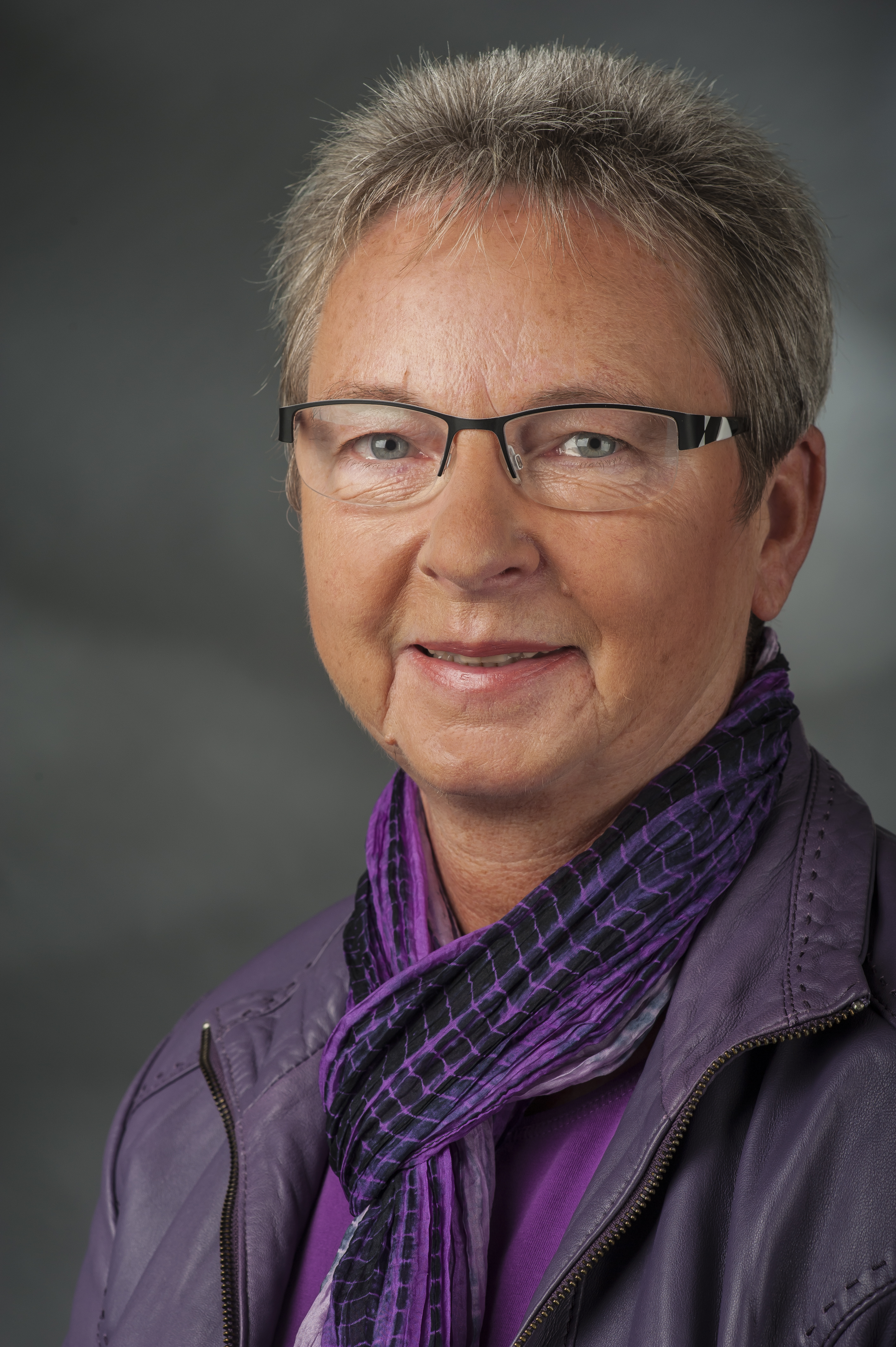
- Kersten Steinke in 2014

Member of the Bundestag
- Incumbent
- Assumed office 2005

Personal details
- Born: 7 December 1958 (age 67) Bad Frankenhausen, German Democratic Republic (now Germany)
- Party: The Left
- Children: 2

Kersten Steinke (born 7 December 1958) is a German politician. Born in Bad Frankenhausen, Thuringia, she represents The Left. Kersten Steinke has served as a member of the Bundestag from the state of Thuringia from 1998 till 2002 and since 2005.

== Life ==
After attending the polytechnic secondary school in Bad Frankenhausen, Steinke completed vocational training from 1975 to 1978 with a high school diploma as an agricultural technician/mechanic in Aschersleben. She then studied at the Economics Section of the Martin Luther University Halle-Wittenberg until 1981. Afterwards she worked as a feed economist at the LPG (animal production) Bad Frankenhausen until 1983. In addition, she completed a correspondence course at the Agricultural Engineering School in Stadtroda, which she completed in 1985 as an agricultural engineer in animal production. From 1983 to 1989 Steinke was secretary of the district executive committee of the Association of allotment gardeners, settlers and small animal breeders (VKSK) in Artern. From 1998 to 2002 she was a member of the German Bundestag. From 2004 to 2005, she was a member of the Thuringian state parliament. In 2005 she was re-elected to the German Bundestag. She is a member of the Committee on Petitions and the Committee on Food and Agriculture. In her group she is Parliamentary Secretary.
