= Joachim Ebmeyer =

German politician (born 1985)

Member of the Bundestag
- Assuming office March 2025
- Succeeding: Stefan Schwartze
- Constituency: Herford – Minden-Lübbecke II

Personal details
- Born: 30 January 1985 (age 41) Bielefeld
- Party: Christian Democratic Union (since 2007)
- Education: Humboldt University of Berlin; University of Münster

Joachim Simon Ebmeyer (born 30 January 1985 in Bielefeld) is a German economist and politician who has been serving as a member of the Bundestag since 2025, representing the Herford – Minden-Lübbecke II district. He has served as chairman of the Christian Democratic Union in Herford since 2022.

== Career ==
After having studied economics at the Humboldt University of Berlin and University of Münster, Ebmeyer worked for several politicians in the Bundestag, including Willi Zylajew, Tim Ostermann and Ralph Brinkhaus. After that, from 2018 to 2019, he worked as a consultant for data economics, digitalization and innovation at the Federation of German Industries. Following that, he was the deputy chief of staff in the office of Ralph Brinkhaus and an assistant to the later chancellor Friedrich Merz. After 2023, he worked as a freelancing consultant.

Since 2025, he is a member of the Bundestag. In that role, he is a member of the committee for Digitalization and State modernization, as well as the committee for Research, Technology and Aerospace.

He is married and is a father to two children.
