= Magdeburg (electoral district) =

Federal electoral district of Germany

69 Magdeburg
- Electoral district for the Bundestag
- Magdeburg in 2025
- State: Saxony-Anhalt
- Population: 292,400 (2019)
- Electorate: 229,198 (2021)
- Major settlements: Magdeburg; Schönebeck
- Area: 588.9 km^{2}

Current electoral district
- Created: 1990
- Party: AfD
- Member: Claudia Weiss
- Elected: 2025

Magdeburg is an electoral constituency (German: Wahlkreis) represented in the Bundestag. It elects one member via first-past-the-post voting. Under the current constituency numbering system, it is designated as constituency 69. It is located in central Saxony-Anhalt, comprising the city of Magdeburg and northeastern parts of Salzlandkreis district.

Magdeburg was created for the inaugural 1990 federal election after German reunification. From 2021 to 2025, it was represented by Martin Kröber of the Social Democratic Party (SPD). Since 2025 it has been represented by Claudia Weiss of the AfD.

== Geography ==
Magdeburg is located in central Saxony-Anhalt. As of the 2025 federal election, it comprises the independent city of Magdeburg as well as the municipalities of Barby, Bördeland, Calbe, and Schönebeck from the Salzlandkreis district.

== History ==
Magdeburg was created after German reunification in 1990. In the 1990 through 1998 elections, it was constituency 286 in the numbering system. In the 2002 and 2005 elections, it was number 69. In the 2009 election, it was number 70. Since the 2013 election, it has been number 69.

Originally, the constituency comprised the city of Magdeburg without the quarters of Buckau, Fermersleben, Salbke, Westerhüsen, Leipziger Straße, Hopfengarten, and Reform. In the 2002 and 2005 elections, it was coterminous with the city of Magdeburg. In the 2009 election, it acquired the area of the former Schönebeck district, now part of Salzlandkreis district. The constituency acquired its current borders in the 2013 election.

Election	No.	Name	Borders
1990	286	Magdeburg	Magdeburg city (excluding Buckau, Fermersleben, Salbke, Westerhüsen, Leipziger Straße, Hopfengarten, and Reform quarters)
1994	286	Magdeburg	Magdeburg city (excluding Buckau, Fermersleben, Salbke, Westerhüsen, Leipziger Straße, Hopfengarten, and Reform quarters)
1998	286	Magdeburg	Magdeburg city (excluding Buckau, Fermersleben, Salbke, Westerhüsen, Leipziger Straße, Hopfengarten, and Reform quarters)
2002	69	Magdeburg	Magdeburg city
2005	69	Magdeburg	Magdeburg city
2009	70	Magdeburg	Magdeburg city; Schönebeck district
2013	69	Magdeburg	Magdeburg city; Salzlandkreis district (only Barby, Bördeland, Calbe, and Schönebeck municipalities)
2017	69	Magdeburg	Magdeburg city; Salzlandkreis district (only Barby, Bördeland, Calbe, and Schönebeck municipalities)
2021	69	Magdeburg	Magdeburg city; Salzlandkreis district (only Barby, Bördeland, Calbe, and Schönebeck municipalities)
2025	69	Magdeburg	Magdeburg city; Salzlandkreis district (only Barby, Bördeland, Calbe, and Schönebeck municipalities)

== Members ==
The constituency was first represented by Klaus Mildner of the Christian Democratic Union (CDU) from 1990 to 1994. Uwe Küster of the Social Democratic Party (SPD) was elected in 1994 and served until 2009. In the 2009 election, Rosemarie Hein of The Left was elected representative. Tino Sorge of the CDU was elected in 2013, and re-elected in 2017. Martin Kröber regained it for the SPD in 2021.

Election	Member	Party	%
1990	Klaus Mildner	CDU	34.5
1994	Uwe Küster	SPD	36.2
1998	Uwe Küster	SPD	45.5
2002	Uwe Küster	SPD	47.7
2005	Uwe Küster	SPD	40.8
2009	Rosemarie Hein	LINKE	32.0
2013	Tino Sorge	CDU	36.3
2017	Tino Sorge	CDU	27.4
2021	Martin Kröber	SPD	25.3
2025	Claudia Weiss	AfD	32.2

== Election results ==
=== 2025 election ===
Federal election (2025): Magdeburg
Notes:	Blue background denotes the winner of the electorate vote. Pink background denotes a candidate elected from their party list. Yellow background denotes an electorate win by a list member, or other incumbent. A ✓ or ✗ denotes status of any incumbent, win or lose respectively.						
Party	Candidate	Votes	%	±%	Party votes	%	±%
AfD	Claudia Weiss	55,457	32.2	▲17.2	52,629	30.4	▲15.3
CDU	Tino Sorge	39,726	23.1	▲1.1	32,205	18.6	▲0.1
SPD	✗ Martin Kröber	29,618	17.2	▼8.0	21,865	12.6	▼13.8
Linke		25,560	14.9	▲5.1	23,224	13.4	▲2.8
BSW					19,461	11.2	New
Greens	Peter Dittmann	10,305	6.0	▼3.3	12,271	7.1	▼3.4
FDP	Robin Neubauer	4,647	2.7	▼5.1	5,231	3.0	▼6.4
Volt					1,901	1.1	▲0.7
FW	Marcel Mallée	3,984	2.3	▲0.8	1,794	1.0	▼0.3
PARTEI					1,769	1.0	▼0.1
BD	Claudius Borgmann	1,909	1.1	New	639	0.4	New
MLPD	Daniel Wiegenstein	843	0.5	▲0.3	240	0.1	0.0
Informal votes		2,419			1,239		
Total valid votes		172,049			173,229		
Turnout		174,468	78.2	▲9.8			
AfD gain from SPD	Majority	15,731	9.1	N/A			

=== 2021 election ===
Federal election (2021): Magdeburg
Notes:	Blue background denotes the winner of the electorate vote. Pink background denotes a candidate elected from their party list. Yellow background denotes an electorate win by a list member, or other incumbent. A ✓ or ✗ denotes status of any incumbent, win or lose respectively.						
Party	Candidate	Votes	%	±%	Party votes	%	±%
SPD	Martin Kröber	39,233	25.3	▲3.5	41,022	26.4	▲9.3
CDU	✗ Tino Sorge	34,177	22.0	▼5.4	28,700	18.5	▼9.3
AfD	Frank Pasemann	23,398	15.1	▼0.2	23,446	15.1	▼1.1
Left	Chris Scheunchen	15,137	9.7	▼9.1	16,449	10.6	▼8.1
Greens	Urs Liebau	14,381	9.3	▲5.3	16,352	10.5	▲5.2
FDP	Fabian Horn	12,139	7.8	▲1.1	14,673	9.4	▲1.5
Tierschutzallianz	Aila Fassl	4,357	2.8	▲0.3	3,135	2.0	0.0
Independent	Franka Kretschmer	3,094	2.0				
FW	Eckhard Horst Schröder	2,430	1.6	▲0.5	2,060	1.3	▲0.5
dieBasis	Reiner Füllmich	2,247	1.4		2,021	1.3	
Gartenpartei	Roland Zander	2,095	1.3	▼0.3	1,898	1.2	▲0.2
PARTEI	Luisa Graviat	2,081	1.3		1,737	1.1	▼0.4
Tierschutzpartei					1,464	0.9	
Pirates					655	0.4	
Volt					578	0.4	
NPD					339	0.2	▼0.4
Humanists					282	0.2	
du.					209	0.1	
ÖDP	Peter von Pokrzywnicki	302	0.2		192	0.1	
MLPD	Daniel Alexander Wiegenstein	221	0.1	▼0.1	173	0.1	▼0.1
Informal votes		1,497			1,405		
Total valid votes		155,292			155,384		
Turnout		156,789	68.4	0.0			
SPD gain from CDU	Majority	5,056	3.3				

=== 2017 election ===
Federal election (2017): Magdeburg
Notes:	Blue background denotes the winner of the electorate vote. Pink background denotes a candidate elected from their party list. Yellow background denotes an electorate win by a list member, or other incumbent. A ✓ or ✗ denotes status of any incumbent, win or lose respectively.						
Party	Candidate	Votes	%	±%	Party votes	%	±%
CDU	✓ Tino Sorge	44,021	27.4	▼8.9	44,616	27.8	▼9.7
SPD	Burkhard Lischka	34,877	21.7	▼3.4	27,513	17.1	▼3.8
Left	Eva von Angern	30,299	18.9	▼6.4	30,056	18.7	▼5.3
AfD	Frank Pasemann	24,509	15.3		26,051	16.2	▲12.0
FDP	Karl-Heinz Paqué	10,796	6.7	▲5.3	12,713	7.9	▲5.5
Greens	Matthias Borowiak	6,417	4.0	0.0	8,564	5.3	▼0.3
Tierschutzallianz	Bettina Fassl	4,102	2.6		3,254	2.0	
MG	Marcel Guderjahn	2,570	1.6		1,672	1.0	
PARTEI					2,504	1.6	
FW	Karlheinz Körner	1,739	1.1	▼0.2	1,282	0.8	0.0
DiB					793	0.5	
NPD	Gustav Haenschke	765	0.5	▼1.4	937	0.6	▼0.9
BGE					528	0.3	
MLPD	Daniel Wiegenstein	461	0.3	0.0	294	0.2	0.0
Informal votes		2,338			2,117		
Total valid votes		160,556			160,777		
Turnout		162,894	68.4	▲5.2			
CDU hold	Majority	9,144	5.7	▼5.3			

=== 2013 election ===
Federal election (2013): Magdeburg
Notes:	Blue background denotes the winner of the electorate vote. Pink background denotes a candidate elected from their party list. Yellow background denotes an electorate win by a list member, or other incumbent. A ✓ or ✗ denotes status of any incumbent, win or lose respectively.						
Party	Candidate	Votes	%	±%	Party votes	%	±%
CDU	Tino Sorge	55,046	36.3	▲5.5	56,982	37.5	▲9.6
Left	✗ Rosemarie Hein	38,231	25.2	▼6.9	36,473	24.0	▼8.2
SPD	Burkhard Lischka	38,153	25.2	▲3.2	31,763	20.9	▲2.1
AfD					6,355	4.2	
Greens	Stephan Bischoff	6,073	4.0	▼1.8	8,490	5.6	▼1.3
Pirates	Jörg Schulenburg	4,153	2.7		3,654	2.4	▼0.7
NPD	Gustav Walter Haenschke	2,786	1.8	▲0.1	2,272	1.5	0.0
Tierschutzpartei					2,758	1.8	
FDP	Sven Fricke	2,090	1.4	▼5.2	3,687	2.4	▼6.7
FW	Christian Heimann	1,875	1.2		1,256	0.8	
PRO					466	0.3	
MLPD	Daniel Wiegenstein	403	0.3	▼0.1	280	0.2	▼0.1
ÖDP					348	0.2	
Informal votes		2,836			2,378		
Total valid votes		151,568			152,026		
Turnout		154,404	63.2	▲3.0			
CDU gain from Left	Majority	16,815	11.1				

=== 2009 election ===
Federal election (2009): Magdeburg
Notes:	Blue background denotes the winner of the electorate vote. Pink background denotes a candidate elected from their party list. Yellow background denotes an electorate win by a list member, or other incumbent. A ✓ or ✗ denotes status of any incumbent, win or lose respectively.						
Party	Candidate	Votes	%	±%	Party votes	%	±%
Left	Rosemarie Hein	48,069	32.0	▲6.1	48,333	32.1	▲5.2
CDU	Bernd Heynemann	46,481	31.0	▲6.7	42,150	28.0	▲6.0
SPD	Burkhard Lischka	32,844	21.9	▼18.0	28,217	18.8	▼17.4
FDP	Ulrich Koehler	9,890	6.6	▲2.6	13,801	9.2	▲2.6
Greens	Dorothea Frederking	8,637	5.8	▲2.5	10,281	6.8	▲1.5
Pirates					4,605	3.1	
NPD	Matthias Gärtner	2,618	1.7	▼0.1	2,275	1.5	▼0.2
Independent	Eva-Maria Godau	851	0.6				
MLPD	Daniel Wiegenstein	626	0.4	▼0.1	410	0.3	▼0.1
DVU					294	0.2	
Informal votes		2,932			2,582		
Total valid votes		150,016			150,366		
Turnout		152,948	60.1	▼10.5			
Left gain from SPD	Majority	1,588	1.0				

=== 2005 election ===
Federal election (2005):Magdeburg
Notes:	Blue background denotes the winner of the electorate vote. Pink background denotes a candidate elected from their party list. Yellow background denotes an electorate win by a list member, or other incumbent. A ✓ or ✗ denotes status of any incumbent, win or lose respectively.						
Party	Candidate	Votes	%	±%	Party votes	%	±%
SPD	✓ Uwe Küster	54,634	40.8	▼6.9	50,074	37.3	▼9.0
Left	Hans-Werner Brüning	35,005	26.1	▲10.6	35,814	26.7	▲11.3
CDU	Bernd Heynemann	31,225	23.3	▼3.1	27,803	20.7	▼3.0
FDP	Holger Franke	4,954	3.7	▼2.2	8,550	6.4	▼0.8
Greens	Sören Herbst	4,867	3.6	▲0.5	8,147	6.1	▲0.9
NPD	Waldemar Maier	2,333	1.7		2,224	1.7	▲0.9
MLPD	Daniel Wiegenstein	873	0.7		606	0.5	
Pro German Center – Pro D-Mark Initiative					499	0.4	
REP					285	0.2	
Schill					140	0.1	
Informal votes		3,046			2,795		
Total valid votes		133,891			134,142		
Turnout		136,937	71.1	▲2.2			
SPD hold	Majority	19,629	14.7				
