= German Parliamentary Committee investigation of the NSA spying scandal =

Investigation by the German parliamentary committee

The German Parliamentary Committee investigation of the NSA spying scandal (official title: 1. Untersuchungsausschuss der 18. Wahlperiode des Deutschen Bundestages) was started on March 20, 2014, by the German Parliament in order to investigate the extent and background of foreign secret services spying in Germany in the light of the Global surveillance disclosures (2013–present). The committee is also in search of strategies on how to protect telecommunication with technical means.

== Members ==
The committee is formed by eight members of the German Parliament. The parliamentarian of the Christian Democratic Union (CDU) Clemens Binninger was head of the committee but stepped down after six days. In a statement, Binninger clarified that the other committee members had insisted on inviting Edward Snowden to testify; Binninger objected to this and resigned in protest. Patrick Sensburg (CDU) succeeded him.

Members of the Committee
Position	Name	Party
Chairman	Patrick Sensburg	CDU
Deputy Chairman	Hans-Ulrich Krüger	SPD
Member	Christian Flisek	SPD
Member	Roderich Kiesewetter	CDU
Member	Andrea Lindholz	CSU
Member	Konstantin von Notz	The Greens
Member	Martina Renner	The Left
Member	Tankred Schipanski	CDU

Deputy Members
Name	Party
Marian Wendt	CDU
Susanne Mittag	SPD
Burkhard Lischka	SPD
Stephan Mayer	CSU
Tim Ostermann	CDU
Hans-Christian Ströbele	The Greens
André Hahn	The Left
Nina Warken	CDU

Former Members
Name	Party
Clemens Binninger	CDU

== Witnesses ==
=== Discussion about the witness Snowden ===
On May 8, 2014, the committee unanimously decided to let US whistleblower Edward Snowden testify as a witness.

On September 23, 2014, the Green Party and The Left filed a constitutional complaint against the Christian Democratic Union, the Social Democrats and the NSA Parliamentary Committee because of the Christian Democrats' and the Social Democrats' refusal to let the witness Edward Snowden testify in Berlin. The accused proposed a video conference from Moscow which Snowden had refused.

On September 28, 2014, the Green Party and The Left filed a constitutional complaint against German chancellor Merkel. According to them, she refuses to comply with her duty according to Chapter 44 of the German constitution to ensure a real investigation; especially by refusing to ensure the legal requirements to allow the witness Edward Snowden to testify.

=== Testimony of Binney and Drake ===
On July 3, 2014, the former Technical Director of the NSA, William Binney, who had become a whistleblower after the terrorist attacks of September 11, 2001, testified to the committee. He said that the NSA has a totalitarian approach that has previously only been known from dictatorships and that there is no longer such a thing as privacy. Former NSA employee Thomas Andrews Drake described the close cooperation between the NSA and the German foreign intelligence service BND.

=== Greenwald's refusal to testify ===
The US journalist Glenn Greenwald was asked to testify in September, 2014. On August 1, 2014, he wrote in a letter that he was willing to support the Parliament's investigation on the espionage in Germany by the NSA but declined to appear before the committee. Greenwald alleged that, by their refusal to hear testimony from Edward Snowden, a crucial witness, German politicians had shown that they prioritised not annoying the US over conducting a proper investigation; Greenwald stated that he was "not prepared to be complicit in a ritual intended to create the appearance of an investigation".

== Operation Eikonal selectors ==
In Operation Eikonal German BND agents received "Selector Lists" from the NSA − search terms for their dragnet surveillance. They contain IP addresses, mobile phone numbers and email accounts with the BND surveillance system containing hundreds of thousands and possibly more than a million such targets. These lists have been subject of controversy as in 2008 it was revealed that they contained some terms targeting the European Aeronautic Defence and Space Company (EADS), the Eurocopter project as well as French administration, which were first noticed by BND employees in 2005. Other selectors were found to target the administration of Austria. After the revelations made by whistleblower Edward Snowden the BND decided to investigate the issue; in October 2013, this investigation concluded that at least 2,000 of these selectors were aimed at Western European or even German interests, which was a violation of the Memorandum of Agreement that the US and Germany signed in 2002 in the wake of the 9/11 terror attacks. After reports emerged in 2014 that EADS and Eurocopter had been surveillance targets the Left Party and the Greens filed an official request to obtain evidence of the violations.

The investigative Parliamentary Committee was set up in spring 2014 and reviewed the selectors and discovered 40,000 suspicious search parameters, including espionage targets in Western European governments and numerous companies. The group also confirmed suspicions that the NSA had systematically violated German interests and concluded that the Americans could have perpetrated economic espionage directly under the Germans' noses. The investigative parliamentary committee was not granted access to the NSA's selectors list as an appeal led by opposition politicians failed at Germany's top court - instead the ruling coalition appointed an administrative judge, Kurt Graulich, as a "person of trust" who was granted access to the list and briefed the investigative commission on its contents after analyzing the 40,000 parameters. In his almost 300-page report, Graulich concluded that European government agencies were targeted to a significant extent, and that the Americans had therefore breached its agreement with Germany. He also found that German targets subject to special protection from surveillance by domestic intelligence agencies under Germany's Basic Law (Grundgesetz) − including numerous enterprises based in Germany − featured abundantly in the NSA's wishlist. On a different scale, Graulich found that problematic BND-internal selectors had been used until the end of 2013: around two thirds of 3300 targets were related to EU and NATO states. Klaus Landefeld, a member of the board at the Internet industry association Eco International, met intelligence officials and legislators to present suggestions for improvement, such as streamlining the selector system.

== Spying on the committee ==
On July 4, 2014, it was revealed to the public that BND officer Markus R. had been arrested on July 2, 2014 on charges of espionage; the 31-year-old German was accused of having worked for the CIA. After his arrest, the US ambassador John B. Emerson was summoned for talks at the German Foreign Office.

It was revealed that the suspect had saved 218 secret BND documents on USB sticks since 2012 and sold them to US agents for a sum of €25,000 in Salzburg, Austria. At least three of the documents were about the NSA Parliamentary Committee. The Federal Office for the Protection of the Constitution had mistaken him for a Russian spy and asked US colleagues to help uncover him. On July 9, 2014, a second US spy was discovered, who worked for the Secretary of Defense.

In July 2014 a Parliament technician discovered that the mobile phone of Roderich Kiesewetter, representative of the Christian Democratic Union in the committee, had been bugged. Kiesewetter said there was evidence that all four Party representatives in the committee had been spied on.

== Document leaks ==
In the months following May 2015, Peter Pilz, a member of the Austrian parliament for the Green Party, disclosed several documents and transcripts related to Operation Eikonal, in which NSA and BND jointly tapped telecommunication cables at a facility of Deutsche Telekom in Frankfurt. These documents were considered highly sensitive and had previously handed to the committee investigating Operation Eikonal, and it therefore appeared that someone from the committee had leaked these documents to Pilz, which contained lists of communication channels from many European countries, including most of Germany's neighbours. Peter Pilz also discovered NSA spying facilities in Austria, his homeland, and subsequently sought an Austrian parliamentary inquiry into the NSA's activities.

On December 1, 2016, WikiLeaks released over 2,400 documents which it claims are from the investigation.

== See also ==
- Dropmire
- PRISM (surveillance program)
- Spying on United Nations leaders by United States diplomats
