= Claudia Weiss =

German politician (born 1975)

Member of the Bundestag
- Assuming office March 2025
- Succeeding: Martin Kröber
- Constituency: Magdeburg

Personal details
- Born: 1975 (age 50–51) Bernburg
- Party: Alternative for Germany

Claudia Weiss (born 7 February 1975 in Bernburg) is a German politician who was elected as a member of the Bundestag in 2025. She is the deputy chairwoman of the district council of Salzland.
