= Patrick Sensburg =

German politician

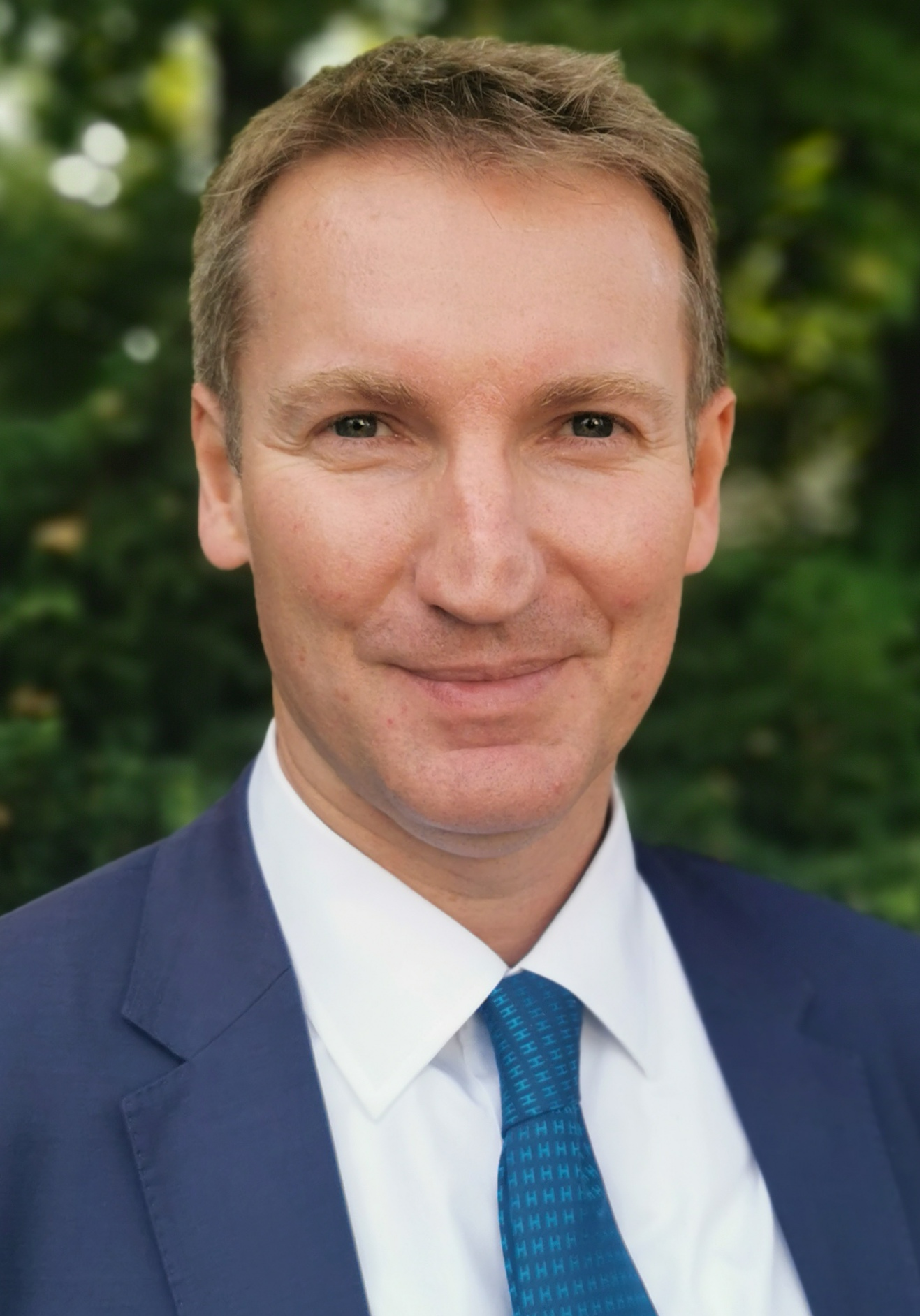
- Sensburg in 2023

Chair of the Election Monitoring, Immunity and Rules of Procedure Committee
- In office 1 February 2018 – 26 October 2021
- Deputy: Florian Toncar
- Preceded by: Johann Wadephul (2017)
- Succeeded by: TBD

Chair of the German Parliamentary Committee investigation of the NSA spying scandal
- In office 9 April 2014 – 28 June 2017
- Deputy: Hans-Ulrich Krüger; Tim Ostermann
- Preceded by: Clemens Binninger
- Succeeded by: Position abolished

Member of the Bundestag for Hochsauerlandkreis
- In office 27 October 2009 – 26 October 2021
- Preceded by: Friedrich Merz
- Succeeded by: Friedrich Merz

Personal details
- Born: 25 June 1971 (age 55) Paderborn, West Germany
- Party: CDU
- Education: University of Trier; University of Luxembourg; German University of Administrative Sciences Speyer
- Website: patrick-sensburg.de

Patrick Ernst Hermann Sensburg (born 25 June 1971) is a German politician of the Christian Democratic Union (CDU) and a professor at the University of Applied Sciences for Police and Public Administration in North Rhine-Westphalia in Cologne. He served as a member of the German Parliament from 2009 until 2021, representing the Hochsauerlandkreis constituency in North Rhine-Westphalia.

Before joining politics, Sensburg worked as Professor of Public Law and European Law. After he completed his military service Sensburg became lieutenant colonel of the reserve in 2014. 2021 he was promoted to Colonel. Since 2019 Sensburg is president of the Reservist Association of Deutsche Bundeswehr.

== Education and professional career ==
Sensburg was born in Paderborn. He studied law and political science and graduated with his first state law exam and a master's degree in political science in 1997. In 1999 he completed his Second State Law Examination. He was a research assistant at the University of Hagen, where he completed his doctorate.

From 2000 to 2006 Sensburg practiced as a lawyer with main focus on municipal law and local tax law. Since then he has been a lecturer at the Hagen Law School for the training of certified specialists in administrative law. From 2006 to 2008 he was a professor at the Federal University of Applied Administrative Sciences at the Federal Criminal Police Office (BKA); he was a member of the senate of the university.

From 2008 to 2021 Sensburg has been is Professor for Public Law and European Law at the University of Applied Sciences for Public Administration and management of North Rhine-Westphalia in Münster. From 2009 to 2012, he was a lecturer in European Law at the Riga International School of Economics and Business Administration (RISEBA). Since 2018 he has also been a visiting professor at the University of Vienna as well as at the Bucharest University of Economic Studies (ASE). From 2022 on Sensburg is Professor for Public Law and European Law at the University of Applied Sciences for Police and Public Administration in North Rhine-Westphalia in Cologne.

== Political career ==
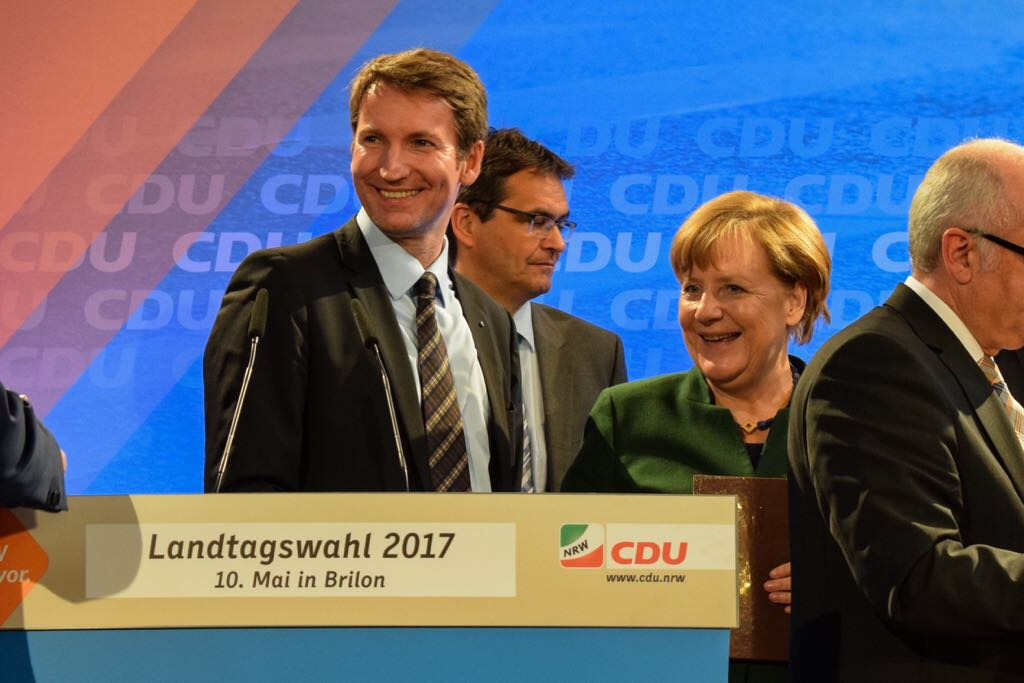
Patrick Sensburg with Angela Merkel

Sensburg has been a member of the CDU since 1989. From 2004 to 2009, he was Deputy Mayor of the City of Brilon and Group Chairman in the City Council of Brilon.

In the 2009 elections, Sensburg first became a member of the German Parliament. He initially served on the Committee on Legal Affairs and, as an alternate member, on the Committee on Internal Affairs. Between 2009 and 2017 he chaired the Subcommittee on European Law. On 10 April 2014 he was elected as Chairman of the Parliamentary Inquiry Committee on the NSA in the 2013-2017 term.

From 2018 until 2021, Sensburg chaired the Committee on Scrutiny of Elections, Immunity and the Rules of Procedure. Furthermore, he was a member of the Parliamentary Oversight Panel (PKGr), which provides parliamentary oversight of Germany's intelligence services BND, BfV and MAD, and of the Council of Elders.

Ahead of the 2021 national elections, Sensburg failed to secure his party's support for a new candidacy; instead, he was replaced by Friedrich Merz.

== Political positions ==
=== Domestic politics ===
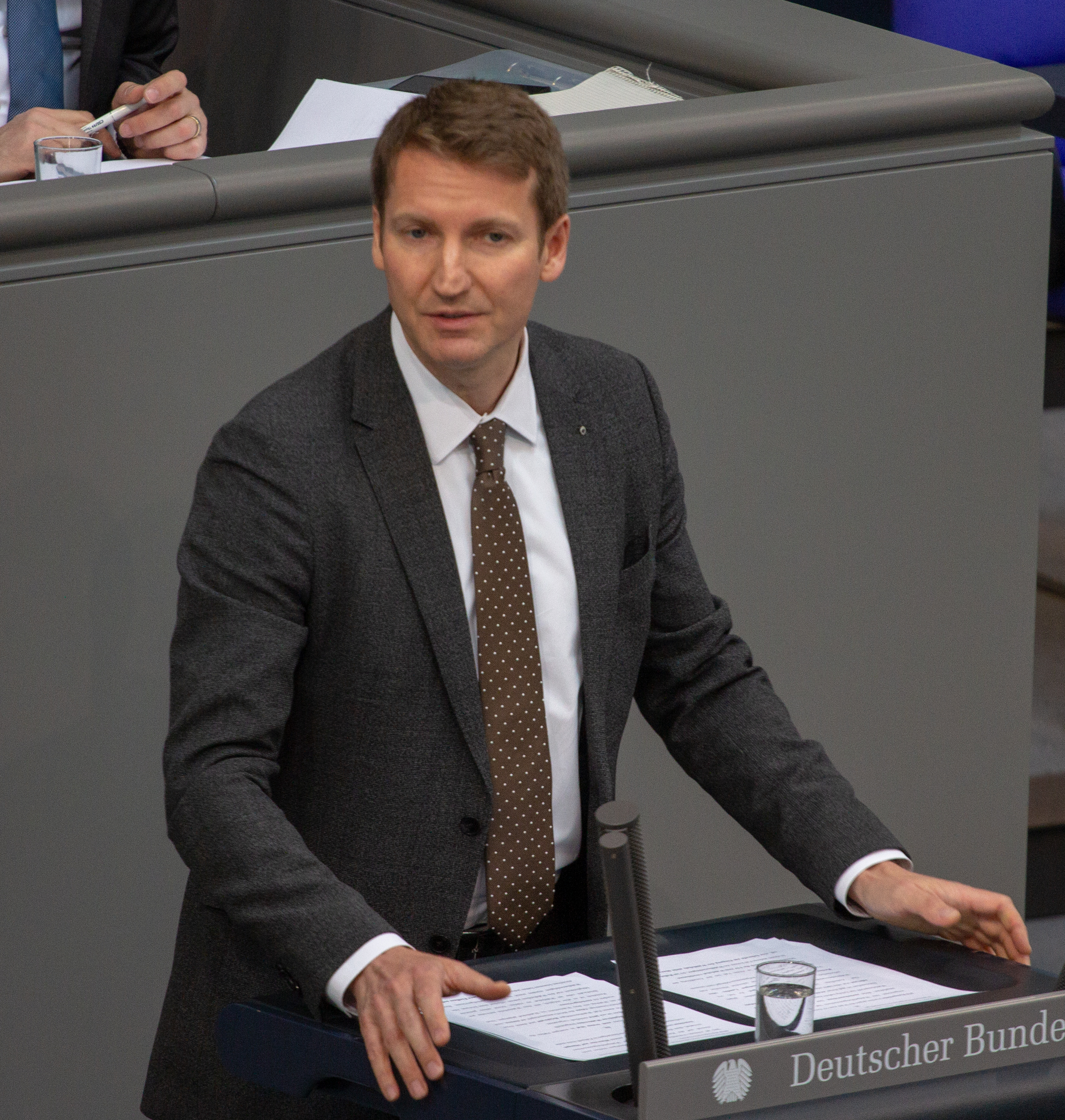
Patrick Sensburg, 2019

In June 2017, Sensburg voted against Germany's introduction of same-sex marriage. Ahead of the Christian Democrats' leadership election in 2018, he publicly endorsed Friedrich Merz to succeed Angela Merkel as the party's chair.

=== German military mission in Iraq 2014 ===
In August 2014, Sensburg supported the decision of deploying the Bundeswehr into Iraq against the organization known as "IS". In addition, Sensburg pointed to the responsibility of Germany towards the people in the refugee camps there: "The protection of the population from the atrocities of the IS militia is our humanitarian responsibility and in our own best interest".

=== NSA inquiry committee ===
As chairman of the NSA inquiry committee, Sensburg presented on 28 June 2017 the final report to President of the Bundestag, Norbert Lammert, with more than 1,800 pages, saying: "There was a lot of consensus, but also different views in the evaluation". The final report was subsequently discussed in the German Bundestag. It became apparent that the coalition and the opposition determined the results differently. Sensburg pointed out that Edward Snowden has encouraged public debate in Germany on the discussion of how to handle with data protection of privacy. Despite some criticism, the Committee of Inquiry of all parliamentary groups in the Bundestag has in principle been reckoned a successful work.

== Reservist Association of Deutsche Bundeswehr ==
On 9 November 2019, Patrick Sensburg, who is a retired lieutenant colonel, was elected by the delegates of the 20th Federal Delegates Assembly of the Association of German Armed Forces Reservists in Bonn as President. In March 2020, Sensburg stressed that the reserve "rifle at heel" was in place when many reservists volunteered to help and support during the COVID 19 pandemic. By early April, more than 15,000 reservists had volunteered.

== Other activities ==
- Federal Agency for Civic Education (BPB), Member of the Board of Trustees (–2021)
- Federal Academy for Security Policy (BAKS), Member of the Advisory Board
- Association of German Foundations, Member of the Parliamentary Advisory Board
- University of Hagen, Member of the Parliamentary Advisory Board

Party political offices
Bundestag
Preceded by Friedrich Merz	Member of the Bundestag for Hochsauerlandkreis; 2009–2021	Succeeded by Friedrich Merz
Other offices
Preceded by Oswin Veith	President of the Reservist Association of Deutsche Bundeswehr; 2019–present	Incumbent
