= Herford – Minden-Lübbecke II =

Federal electoral district of Germany

Coordinates: 52°06′56″N 8°40′12″E

132 Herford – Minden-Lübbecke II
- Electoral district for the Bundestag
- Herford – Minden-Lübbecke II in 2025
- State: North Rhine-Westphalia
- Population: 299,200 (2019)
- Electorate: 226,894 (2021)
- Major settlements: Herford; Bad Oeynhausen; Bünde
- Area: 515.2 km^{2}

Current electoral district
- Created: 1949
- Party: CDU
- Member: Joachim Ebmeyer
- Elected: 2025

Herford – Minden-Lübbecke II is an electoral constituency (German: Wahlkreis) represented in the Bundestag. It elects one member via first-past-the-post voting. Under the current constituency numbering system, it is designated as constituency 132. It is located in eastern North Rhine-Westphalia, comprising the Herford district and a small part of the Minden-Lübbecke district.

Herford – Minden-Lübbecke II was created for the inaugural 1949 federal election. From 2009 to 2025, it has been represented by Stefan Schwartze of the Social Democratic Party (SPD). Since 2025 it has been represented by Joachim Ebmeyer of the CDU.

== Geography ==
Herford – Minden-Lübbecke II is located in eastern North Rhine-Westphalia. As of the 2021 federal election, it comprises the entirety of the Herford district and the municipality of Bad Oeynhausen from the Minden-Lübbecke district.

== History ==
Herford – Minden-Lübbecke II was created in 1949, then known as Herford-Stadt und -Land. From 1965 through 1994, it was named Herford. In the 1998 election, it was named Herford – Minden-Lübbecke I. It acquired its current name in the 2002 election. In the 1949 election, it was North Rhine-Westphalia constituency 48 in the numbering system. From 1953 through 1976, it was number 107. From 1980 through 1998, it was number 103. From 2002 through 2009, it was number 134. In the 2013 through 2021 elections, it was number 133. From the 2025 election, it has been number 132.

Originally, the constituency comprised the independent city of Herford and the district of Landkreis Herford. In the 1972 and 1976 elections, it comprised the district of Herford and the municipality of Kalletal from the Lippe district. In the 1980 through 1994 elections, it was coterminous with the Herford district. In the 1998 election, it comprised the Herford district and the Ortsteile of Bad Oeynhausen-Lohe and Bad Oeynhausen-Rehme from the Minden-Lübbecke district. It acquired its current borders in the 2002 election.

| Election | No. | Name | Borders |
|---|---|---|---|
| 1949 | 48 | Herford-Stadt und -Land | Herford city; Landkreis Herford district |
| 1953 | 107 | Herford-Stadt und -Land | Herford city; Landkreis Herford district |
| 1957 | 107 | Herford-Stadt und -Land | Herford city; Landkreis Herford district |
| 1961 | 107 | Herford-Stadt und -Land | Herford city; Landkreis Herford district |
| 1965 | 107 | Herford | Herford city; Landkreis Herford district |
| 1969 | 107 | Herford | Herford city; Landkreis Herford district |
| 1972 | 107 | Herford | Herford district; Lippe district (only Kalletal municipality) |
| 1976 | 107 | Herford | Herford district; Lippe district (only Kalletal municipality) |
| 1980 | 103 | Herford | Herford district |
| 1983 | 103 | Herford | Herford district |
| 1987 | 103 | Herford | Herford district |
| 1990 | 103 | Herford | Herford district |
| 1994 | 103 | Herford | Herford district |
| 1998 | 103 | Herford – Minden-Lübbecke I | Herford district; Minden-Lübbecke district (only Bad Oeynhausen-Lohe and Bad Oeynhausen-Rehme Ortsteile) |
| 2002 | 134 | Herford – Minden-Lübbecke II | Herford district; Minden-Lübbecke district (only Bad Oeynhausen municipality) |
| 2005 | 134 | Herford – Minden-Lübbecke II | Herford district; Minden-Lübbecke district (only Bad Oeynhausen municipality) |
| 2009 | 134 | Herford – Minden-Lübbecke II | Herford district; Minden-Lübbecke district (only Bad Oeynhausen municipality) |
| 2013 | 133 | Herford – Minden-Lübbecke II | Herford district; Minden-Lübbecke district (only Bad Oeynhausen municipality) |
| 2017 | 133 | Herford – Minden-Lübbecke II | Herford district; Minden-Lübbecke district (only Bad Oeynhausen municipality) |
| 2021 | 133 | Herford – Minden-Lübbecke II | Herford district; Minden-Lübbecke district (only Bad Oeynhausen municipality) |
| 2025 | 132 | Herford – Minden-Lübbecke II | Herford district; Minden-Lübbecke district (only Bad Oeynhausen municipality) |

== Members ==
The constituency has been held by the Social Democratic Party (SPD) during all but two Bundestag term since 1949. It was first represented by Heinrich Höcker of the SPD from 1949 to 1961, followed by Rudolf Bäumer for a single term. Günter Biermann served from 1965 to 1983, when Heinz Landré of the Christian Democratic Union (CDU) was elected. Rolf Koltzsch regained the constituency for the SPD in 1987 and served until 1994. Wolfgang Spanier then served until 2009. Stefan Schwartze was elected in 2009, and re-elected in 2013, 2017, and 2021. In 2025 Joachim Ebmeyer of the CDU took the seat.

| Election | Member | Party | % |
|---|---|---|---|
| 1949 | Heinrich Höcker | SPD | 45.9 |
| 1953 | Heinrich Höcker | SPD | 47.3 |
| 1957 | Heinrich Höcker | SPD | 48.1 |
| 1961 | Rudolf Bäumer | SPD | 49.0 |
| 1965 | Günter Biermann | SPD | 50.7 |
| 1969 | Günter Biermann | SPD | 52.5 |
| 1972 | Günter Biermann | SPD | 57.3 |
| 1976 | Günter Biermann | SPD | 51.5 |
| 1980 | Günter Biermann | SPD | 52.1 |
| 1983 | Heinz Landré | CDU | 46.7 |
| 1987 | Rolf Koltzsch | SPD | 47.5 |
| 1990 | Rolf Koltzsch | SPD | 43.8 |
| 1994 | Wolfgang Spanier | SPD | 48.3 |
| 1998 | Wolfgang Spanier | SPD | 53.1 |
| 2002 | Wolfgang Spanier | SPD | 53.1 |
| 2005 | Wolfgang Spanier | SPD | 47.5 |
| 2009 | Stefan Schwartze | SPD | 38.5 |
| 2013 | Stefan Schwartze | SPD | 41.3 |
| 2017 | Stefan Schwartze | SPD | 36.8 |
| 2021 | Stefan Schwartze | SPD | 36.5 |
| 2025 | Joachim Ebmeyer | CDU | 30.1 |

== Election results ==
=== 2025 election ===
Federal election (2025): Herford – Minden-Lübbecke II
| Notes: | Blue background denotes the winner of the electorate vote. Pink background denotes a candidate elected from their party list. Yellow background denotes an electorate win by a list member, or other incumbent. A ✓ or ✗ denotes status of any incumbent, win or lose respectively. | | | | | | |
| Party | Candidate | Votes | % | ±% | Party votes | % | ±% |
|---|---|---|---|---|---|---|---|
| CDU | Joachim Ebmeyer | 54,251 | 30.1 | ▲3.4 | 50,128 | 27.8 | ▲4.2 |
| SPD | ✗ Stefan Schwartze | 52,574 | 29.2 | ▼7.3 | 38,800 | 21.5 | ▼10.1 |
| AfD | Sebastian Schulze | 38,341 | 21.3 | ▲11.9 | 38,431 | 21.3 | ▲11.7 |
| Greens | Tobias Neumann | 12,898 | 7.2 | ▼3.6 | 17,508 | 9.7 | ▼3.7 |
| Left | Jan Siekmann | 10,738 | 6.0 | ▲2.8 | 12,854 | 7.1 | ▲3.5 |
| BSW | | | | | 8,701 | 4.8 | |
| FDP | Jens Teutrine | 5,867 | 3.3 | ▼5.0 | 7,448 | 4.1 | ▼7.6 |
| PARTEI | Stefan Kannegießer | 2,762 | 1.5 | ▼0.5 | 1,132 | 0.6 | ▼0.6 |
| FW | Eckard Gläsker | 2,222 | 1.2 | ▲0.1 | 1,122 | 0.6 | ▼0.2 |
| Tierschutzpartei | | | | | 2,100 | 1.2 | ▼0.1 |
| Volt | | | | | 769 | 0.4 | ▲0.2 |
| dieBasis | | | | ▼1.3 | 447 | 0.2 | ▼1.1 |
| Values | | | | | 186 | 0.1 | |
| PdF | | | | | 299 | 0.2 | ▲0.1 |
| Team Todenhöfer | | | | | 276 | 0.2 | ▼0.3 |
| BD | | | | | 247 | 0.1 | |
| MERA25 | | | | | 40 | 0.0 | |
| MLPD | | | | | 38 | 0.0 | 0.0 |
| Pirates | | | | | | | ▼0.3 |
| Bündnis C | | | | | | | ▼0.3 |
| Gesundheitsforschung | | | | | | | ▼0.1 |
| Humanists | | | | | | | ▼0.1 |
| ÖDP | | | | | | 0.0 | 0.0 |
| SGP | | | | | | 0.0 | 0.0 |
| Informal votes | | 1,661 | | | 1,223 | | |
| Total valid votes | | 180,088 | | | 180,526 | | |
| Turnout | | 181,749 | 81.5 | ▲6.4 | | | |
| CDU gain from SPD | Majority | 1,677 | 0.9 | | | | |

=== 2021 election ===
Federal election (2021): Herford – Minden-Lübbecke II
| Notes: | Blue background denotes the winner of the electorate vote. Pink background denotes a candidate elected from their party list. Yellow background denotes an electorate win by a list member, or other incumbent. A ✓ or ✗ denotes status of any incumbent, win or lose respectively. | | | | | | |
| Party | Candidate | Votes | % | ±% | Party votes | % | ±% |
|---|---|---|---|---|---|---|---|
| SPD | ✓ Stefan Schwartze | 61,554 | 36.5 | ▼0.3 | 53,359 | 31.6 | ▲2.9 |
| CDU | Joachim Ebmeyer | 45,138 | 26.7 | ▼9.0 | 39,769 | 23.5 | ▼8.2 |
| Greens | Maik Babenhauserheide | 18,090 | 10.7 | ▲5.6 | 22,732 | 13.4 | ▲6.6 |
| AfD | Sebastian Schulze | 15,855 | 9.4 | ▼0.6 | 16,144 | 9.5 | ▼1.3 |
| FDP | Jens Teutrine | 14,021 | 8.3 | ▲2.7 | 19,884 | 11.8 | ▲0.3 |
| Left | Jan Lieberum | 5,332 | 3.2 | ▼2.5 | 6,038 | 3.6 | ▼3.4 |
| PARTEI | Laura Möller | 3,440 | 2.0 | | 2,003 | 1.2 | ▲0.6 |
| dieBasis | Radisa Amidzic | 2,187 | 1.3 | | 2,226 | 1.3 | |
| Tierschutzpartei | | | | | 2,181 | 1.3 | ▲0.6 |
| FW | Evelyn Taborsky | 1,967 | 1.2 | 0.0 | 1,352 | 0.8 | ▲0.2 |
| Independent | Martin Sonnabend | 1,234 | 0.7 | | | | |
| Team Todenhöfer | | | | | 760 | 0.4 | |
| Pirates | | | | | 565 | 0.3 | 0.0 |
| Bündnis C | | | | | 501 | 0.3 | |
| Volt | | | | | 304 | 0.2 | |
| LIEBE | | | | | 212 | 0.1 | |
| LfK | | | | | 185 | 0.1 | |
| Gesundheitsforschung | | | | | 149 | 0.1 | 0.0 |
| NPD | | | | | 144 | 0.1 | ▼0.1 |
| Humanists | | | | | 117 | 0.1 | 0.0 |
| V-Partei3 | | | | | 104 | 0.1 | 0.0 |
| du. | | | | | 80 | 0.0 | |
| ÖDP | | | | | 72 | 0.0 | 0.0 |
| PdF | | | | | 53 | 0.0 | |
| MLPD | | | | | 37 | 0.0 | 0.0 |
| LKR | | | | | 37 | 0.0 | |
| DKP | | | | | 33 | 0.0 | 0.0 |
| SGP | | | | | 15 | 0.0 | 0.0 |
| Informal votes | | 1,646 | | | 1,408 | | |
| Total valid votes | | 168,818 | | | 169,056 | | |
| Turnout | | 170,464 | 75.1 | ▲1.5 | | | |
| SPD hold | Majority | 16,416 | 9.8 | ▲8.7 | | | |

=== 2017 election ===
Federal election (2017): Herford – Minden-Lübbecke II
| Notes: | Blue background denotes the winner of the electorate vote. Pink background denotes a candidate elected from their party list. Yellow background denotes an electorate win by a list member, or other incumbent. A ✓ or ✗ denotes status of any incumbent, win or lose respectively. | | | | | | |
| Party | Candidate | Votes | % | ±% | Party votes | % | ±% |
|---|---|---|---|---|---|---|---|
| SPD | ✓ Stefan Schwartze | 61,205 | 36.7 | ▼4.6 | 47,940 | 28.7 | ▼6.2 |
| CDU | Tim Ostermann | 59,571 | 35.8 | ▼5.1 | 52,994 | 31.7 | ▼7.6 |
| AfD | Sebastian Richard Schulze | 16,633 | 10.0 | | 18,098 | 10.8 | ▲7.2 |
| FDP | Siegfried Mühlenweg | 9,411 | 5.6 | ▲2.1 | 19,186 | 11.5 | ▲7.3 |
| Left | Fabian Alexander Stoffel | 9,353 | 5.6 | ▲0.2 | 11,589 | 6.9 | ▲1.1 |
| Greens | Maik Babenhauserheide | 8,444 | 5.1 | 0.0 | 11,485 | 6.9 | ▼0.7 |
| Tierschutzpartei | | | | | 1,222 | 0.7 | |
| PARTEI | | | | | 1,002 | 0.6 | ▲0.3 |
| FW | Jörn Döring | 1,975 | 1.2 | ▲0.5 | 972 | 0.6 | ▲0.2 |
| Pirates | | | | | 640 | 0.4 | ▼1.7 |
| AD-DEMOKRATEN | | | | | 408 | 0.2 | |
| NPD | | | | | 342 | 0.2 | ▼0.6 |
| V-Partei³ | | | | | 171 | 0.1 | |
| DM | | | | | 159 | 0.1 | |
| Volksabstimmung | | | | | 153 | 0.1 | ▼0.1 |
| Gesundheitsforschung | | | | | 140 | 0.1 | |
| ÖDP | | | | | 133 | 0.1 | 0.0 |
| DiB | | | | | 127 | 0.1 | |
| BGE | | | | | 112 | 0.1 | |
| Die Humanisten | | | | | 73 | 0.0 | |
| MLPD | | | | | 70 | 0.0 | 0.0 |
| DKP | | | | | 23 | 0.0 | |
| SGP | | | | | 8 | 0.0 | 0.0 |
| Informal votes | | 2,072 | | | 1,617 | | |
| Total valid votes | | 166,592 | | | 167,047 | | |
| Turnout | | 168,664 | 73.7 | ▲2.7 | | | |
| SPD hold | Majority | 1,634 | 0.9 | ▲0.4 | | | |

=== 2013 election ===
Federal election (2013): Herford – Minden-Lübbecke II
| Notes: | Blue background denotes the winner of the electorate vote. Pink background denotes a candidate elected from their party list. Yellow background denotes an electorate win by a list member, or other incumbent. A ✓ or ✗ denotes status of any incumbent, win or lose respectively. | | | | | | |
| Party | Candidate | Votes | % | ±% | Party votes | % | ±% |
|---|---|---|---|---|---|---|---|
| SPD | ✓ Stefan Schwartze | 66,637 | 41.3 | ▲2.8 | 56,554 | 34.9 | ▲2.0 |
| CDU | Tim Ostermann | 65,873 | 40.8 | ▲3.2 | 63,755 | 39.4 | ▲6.8 |
| Left | Inge Höger | 8,706 | 5.4 | ▼2.0 | 9,409 | 5.8 | ▼2.1 |
| Greens | Eyüp Odabasi | 8,209 | 5.1 | ▼1.7 | 12,297 | 7.6 | ▼1.1 |
| FDP | Frank Schäffler | 5,651 | 3.5 | ▼6.1 | 6,798 | 4.2 | ▼9.3 |
| AfD | | | | | 5,832 | 3.6 | |
| Pirates | Dennis Deutschkämer | 4,697 | 2.9 | | 3,350 | 2.1 | ▲0.6 |
| NPD | | | | | 1,267 | 0.8 | ▼0.1 |
| FW | Lutz Schröter | 1,119 | 0.7 | | 661 | 0.4 | |
| PARTEI | | | | | 476 | 0.3 | |
| Independent | Rein | 441 | 0.3 | | | | |
| PRO | | | | | 332 | 0.2 | |
| Volksabstimmung | | | | | 286 | 0.2 | ▲0.1 |
| REP | | | | | 211 | 0.1 | ▼0.2 |
| ÖDP | | | | | 186 | 0.1 | 0.0 |
| Nichtwahler | | | | | 175 | 0.1 | |
| Party of Reason | | | | | 109 | 0.1 | |
| RRP | | | | | 76 | 0.0 | ▼0.1 |
| BIG | | | | | 67 | 0.0 | |
| MLPD | | | | | 36 | 0.0 | 0.0 |
| PSG | | | | | 32 | 0.0 | 0.0 |
| BüSo | | | | | 29 | 0.0 | 0.0 |
| Die Rechte | | | | | 22 | 0.0 | |
| Informal votes | | 2,842 | | | 1,855 | | |
| Total valid votes | | 161,333 | | | 161,960 | | |
| Turnout | | 163,815 | 70.9 | ▲0.3 | | | |
| SPD hold | Majority | 764 | 0.5 | ▼0.3 | | | |

=== 2009 election ===
Federal election (2009): Herford – Minden-Lübbecke II
| Notes: | Blue background denotes the winner of the electorate vote. Pink background denotes a candidate elected from their party list. Yellow background denotes an electorate win by a list member, or other incumbent. A ✓ or ✗ denotes status of any incumbent, win or lose respectively. | | | | | | |
| Party | Candidate | Votes | % | ±% | Party votes | % | ±% |
|---|---|---|---|---|---|---|---|
| SPD | Stefan Schwartze | 62,644 | 38.5 | ▼9.0 | 53,661 | 32.9 | ▼7.8 |
| CDU | Wolfgang Rußkamp | 61,244 | 37.7 | ▼3.3 | 53,025 | 32.5 | ▼2.7 |
| FDP | Frank Schäffler | 15,549 | 9.6 | ▲6.0 | 22,018 | 13.5 | ▲4.0 |
| Left | Inge Höger | 12,090 | 7.4 | ▲3.6 | 12,887 | 7.9 | ▲2.9 |
| Greens | Irmgard Pehle | 11,091 | 6.8 | ▲3.9 | 14,121 | 8.7 | ▲2.0 |
| Pirates | | | | | 2,373 | 1.5 | |
| NPD | | | | | 1,362 | 0.8 | 0.0 |
| Tierschutzpartei | | | | | 942 | 0.6 | ▲0.1 |
| FAMILIE | | | | | 856 | 0.5 | ▲0.1 |
| REP | | | | | 603 | 0.4 | 0.0 |
| RENTNER | | | | | 421 | 0.3 | |
| RRP | | | | | 215 | 0.1 | |
| Volksabstimmung | | | | | 189 | 0.1 | 0.0 |
| ÖDP | | | | | 137 | 0.1 | |
| DVU | | | | | 90 | 0.1 | |
| Centre | | | | | 56 | 0.0 | 0.0 |
| MLPD | | | | | 31 | 0.0 | 0.0 |
| BüSo | | | | | 26 | 0.0 | 0.0 |
| PSG | | | | | 23 | 0.0 | 0.0 |
| Informal votes | | 2,497 | | | 2,079 | | |
| Total valid votes | | 162,618 | | | 163,036 | | |
| Turnout | | 165,115 | 70.6 | ▼7.7 | | | |
| SPD hold | Majority | 1,400 | 0.8 | ▼5.7 | | | |

=== 2005 election ===
Federal election (2005): Herford – Minden-Lübbecke II
| Notes: | Blue background denotes the winner of the electorate vote. Pink background denotes a candidate elected from their party list. Yellow background denotes an electorate win by a list member, or other incumbent. A ✓ or ✗ denotes status of any incumbent, win or lose respectively. | | | | | | |
| Party | Candidate | Votes | % | ±% | Party votes | % | ±% |
|---|---|---|---|---|---|---|---|
| SPD | ✓ Wolfgang Spainer | 85,908 | 47.5 | ▼2.1 | 73,666 | 40.7 | ▼4.7 |
| CDU | Reinhard Göhner | 74,103 | 41.0 | ▲2.8 | 63,671 | 35.2 | ▼0.2 |
| Left | Inge Höger-Neuling | 6,894 | 3.8 | ▲2.8 | 9,056 | 5.0 | ▲4.0 |
| FDP | Frank Schäffler | 6,476 | 3.6 | ▼2.0 | 17,147 | 9.5 | ▲0.9 |
| Greens | Angela Holstiege | 5,319 | 2.9 | ▼1.1 | 12,003 | 6.6 | ▼0.6 |
| NPD | Michael Koch | 1,991 | 1.1 | | 1,523 | 0.8 | ▲0.6 |
| Tierschutzpartei | | | | | 817 | 0.5 | ▲0.1 |
| Familie | | | | | 769 | 0.4 | ▲0.2 |
| REP | | | | | 661 | 0.4 | 0.0 |
| PBC | | | | | 659 | 0.4 | ▲0.1 |
| GRAUEN | | | | | 440 | 0.2 | ▲0.1 |
| From Now on... Democracy Through Referendum | | | | | 210 | 0.1 | |
| Socialist Equality Party | | | | | 68 | 0.0 | |
| MLPD | | | | | 50 | 0.0 | |
| BüSo | | | | | 39 | 0.0 | |
| Centre | | | | | 32 | 0.0 | 0.0 |
| Informal votes | | 2,473 | | | 2,353 | | |
| Total valid votes | | 180,691 | | | 180,811 | | |
| Turnout | | 183,164 | 78.3 | ▼2.8 | | | |
| SPD hold | Majority | 11,805 | 6.5 | | | | |
