= RAMPART-A =

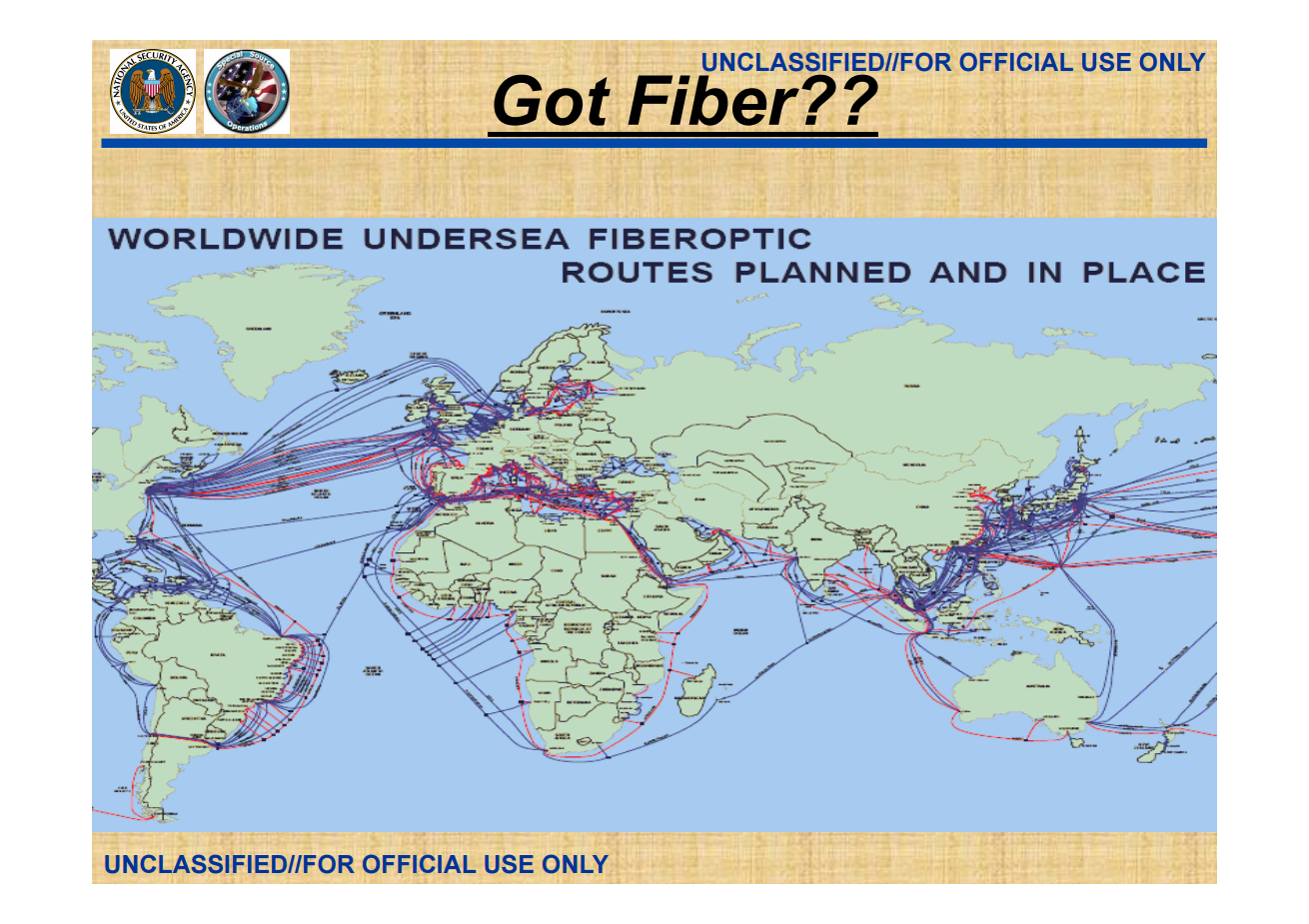
Screenshot from one of the unclassified slides in the published top secret documents. The aim of the program is to gain access to these fiber-optic cables.

NSA lists "Approved SIGINT countries" which are divided into two groups by their cooperation level with the NSA. Second Partners Third Partners

RAMPART-A is the code name for global mass surveillance and world-wide signals intelligence partnership program led by the United States National Security Agency (NSA). The aim of the program is to "gain access to high-capacity international fiber-optic cables that transit at major congestion points around the world".

NSA is working with secret cooperation with the partner countries, which are hosting U.S. equipment and providing access to the fiber-optic cables. In 2013 the program had "access to over 3 terabits per second of data streaming world-wide and encompasses all communication technologies such as voice, fax, telex, modem, email internet chat, virtual private network (VPN), voice over IP (VoIP), and voice call records" and there were total of 37 partner countries including 17 European Union member states.

There are two conditions on the partnership between the NSA and the partner country for making an agreement. The first one is that the partner countries will not use the NSA's technology to collect any data on U.S. citizens. The second one is that the NSA will not use the access it has been granted in the partner countries to collect data on the host countries' citizens. Although these conditions have exceptions, NSA doesn't state which those exceptions are. According to Edward Snowden, these agreements between the NSA and its partner countries are vague and are easily circumvented.

The program was publicly revealed in June 2014, by the Danish newspaper Dagbladet Information and by The Intercept. Revelation of the program was based on as part of the leaks by the former NSA contractor Edward Snowden.

According to a NSA's classified intelligence briefing in 2010, RAMPART-A was used across all NSA Analysis and Production lines, and in the previous year (2009), over 9000 intelligence reports were written based solely on the RAMPART-A data.

The program cost about $170 million between 2011 and 2013. The program started in 1992.

XKeyscore is implemented in the program's architecture.

== Partners ==
The partner countries are divided into two groups by their cooperation level, "Second" and "Third".

For the host partner country, U.S. provides processing and analysis tools and equipment, which means that the partner countries are able to use the NSA's tools for processing and analysing the data that flows in and out of their country. It's likely that not every partner country has RAMPART-A site(s); in 2013 NSA had set up at least 13 RAMPART-A sites, nine of which were in active state. Three of the largest sites, AZUREPHOENIX, SPINNERET and MOONLIGHTPATH gathers traffic from some 70 different cables or networks.

Second level (partners of the Five Eyes) partner countries:

- Australia
- Canada
- New Zealand
- United Kingdom

Third level partner countries:

- Algeria
- Austria
- Belgium
- Croatia
- Czech Republic
- Denmark
- Ethiopia
- Finland
- France
- Germany
- Greece
- Hungary
- India
- Israel
- Italy
- Japan
- Jordan
- South Korea
- Macedonia
- Netherlands
- Norway
- Pakistan
- Poland
- Romania
- Saudi Arabia
- Singapore
- Spain
- Sweden
- Taiwan
- Thailand
- Tunisia
- Turkey
- United Arab Emirates

== See also ==
- 2013 mass surveillance disclosures
- List of government surveillance projects
- Mass surveillance
- XKeyscore
- Operation Eikonal
- ECHELON
- PRISM
