= Hochsauerlandkreis (electoral district) =

Federal electoral district of Germany

146 Hochsauerlandkreis
- Electoral district for the Bundestag
- Hochsauerlandkreis in 2025
- State: North Rhine-Westphalia
- Population: 259,800 (2019)
- Electorate: 200,496 (2021)
- Major settlements: Arnsberg; Meschede; Sundern
- Area: 1,960.2 km^{2}

Current electoral district
- Created: 1980
- Party: CDU
- Member: Friedrich Merz
- Elected: 2021, 2025

Hochsauerlandkreis is an electoral constituency (German: Wahlkreis) represented in the Bundestag. It elects one member via first-past-the-post voting. Under the current constituency numbering system, it is designated as constituency 146. It is located in eastern North Rhine-Westphalia, comprising the district of Hochsauerlandkreis.

Hochsauerlandkreis was created for the 1980 federal election. Since 2021, it has been represented by Chancellor Friedrich Merz of the Christian Democratic Union (CDU).

== Geography ==
Hochsauerlandkreis is located in eastern North Rhine-Westphalia. As of the 2021 federal election, it is coterminous with the Hochsauerlandkreis district.

== History ==
Hochsauerlandkreis was created in 1980. In the 1980 through 1998 elections, it was constituency 119 in the numbering system. From 2002 through 2009, it was number 148. In the 2013 through 2021 elections, it was number 147. From the 2025 election, it has been number 146. Its borders have not changed since its creation.

== Members ==
The constituency has been held continuously by the Christian Democratic Union (CDU) since its creation. It was first represented by Ferdinand Tillmann from 1980 to 1994. Friedrich Merz was representative from 1994 to 2009. Patrick Sensburg was elected in 2009, and re-elected in 2013 and 2017. Former member Merz successfully sought election again in 2021 and was re-elected in 2025. In the same election Merz became Chancellor of Germany.

Election	Member	Party	%
1980	Ferdinand Tillmann	CDU	57.4
1983	Ferdinand Tillmann	CDU	62.9
1987	Ferdinand Tillmann	CDU	57.6
1990	Ferdinand Tillmann	CDU	55.4
1994	Friedrich Merz	CDU	54.3
1998	Friedrich Merz	CDU	51.4
2002	Friedrich Merz	CDU	53.7
2005	Friedrich Merz	CDU	57.7
2009	Patrick Sensburg	CDU	51.7
2013	Patrick Sensburg	CDU	56.1
2017	Patrick Sensburg	CDU	48.0
2021	Friedrich Merz	CDU	40.4
2025	Friedrich Merz	CDU	47.7

== Election results ==
=== 2025 election ===
Federal election (2025): Hochsauerlandkreis
Notes:	Blue background denotes the winner of the electorate vote. Pink background denotes a candidate elected from their party list. Yellow background denotes an electorate win by a list member, or other incumbent. A ✓ or ✗ denotes status of any incumbent, win or lose respectively.						
Party	Candidate	Votes	%	±%	Party votes	%	±%
CDU	✓ Friedrich Merz	78,620	47.7	▲7.3	71,615	43.6	▲10.2
SPD	Dirk Wiese	35,079	21.4	▼10.8	26,873	16.4	▼12.3
AfD	Bernhard Bühner	26,025	15.9	▲9.4	27,390	16.7	▲9.3
Greens	Sandra Stein	10,025	6.1	▼1.9	12,026	7.3	▼2.6
Left	Lara Kuse	7,646	4.7	▲2.9	8,774	5.3	▲2.8
BSW					5,295	3.2	
FDP	Carl-Julius Cronenberg	4,182	2.6	▼4.4	6,299	3.8	▼8.2
FW	Sebastian Vielhaber	2,783	1.7	▲0.3	1,142	0.7	▼0.3
Tierschutzpartei					1,958	1.2	▼0.1
PARTEI				▼1.9	908	0.6	▼0.7
Volt					785	0.5	▲0.3
dieBasis				▼0.9	336	0.2	▼0.7
Team Todenhöfer					215	0.1	▼0.1
PdF					213	0.1	▲0.1
BD					202	0.1	
Values					86	0.1	
MERA25					28	0.0	
MLPD					27	0.0	0.0
Pirates							▼0.3
Gesundheitsforschung							▼0.1
ÖDP							▼0.1
Humanists							▼0.1
Bündnis C							0.0
SGP							0.0
Informal votes		1,047			865		
Total valid votes		164,000			164,182		
Turnout		165,047	83.9	▲5.8			
CDU hold	Majority	43,541	26.3				

=== 2021 election ===
Federal election (2021): Hochsauerlandkreis
Notes:	Blue background denotes the winner of the electorate vote. Pink background denotes a candidate elected from their party list. Yellow background denotes an electorate win by a list member, or other incumbent. A ✓ or ✗ denotes status of any incumbent, win or lose respectively.						
Party	Candidate	Votes	%	±%	Party votes	%	±%
CDU	Friedrich Merz	62,810	40.4	▼7.5	52,017	33.5	▼8.2
SPD	Dirk Wiese	50,056	32.2	▲5.3	44,640	28.7	▲5.9
Greens	Maria Tillmann	12,478	8.0	▲3.8	15,473	10.0	▲5.2
FDP	Carl-Julius Cronenberg	10,806	7.0	▼1.5	18,712	12.0	▼2.3
AfD	Otto Strauß	10,068	6.5	▼0.8	11,532	7.4	▼0.6
PARTEI	Andreas Hövelmann	2,909	1.9		1,983	1.3	▲0.7
Left	Karl-Ludwig Gössling	2,685	1.7	▼2.5	3,989	2.6	▼2.8
Tierschutzpartei					1,943	1.2	▲0.6
FW	Sebastian Vielhaber	2,224	1.4	▲0.5	1,583	1.0	▲0.5
dieBasis	Klaus Selter	1,381	0.9		1,346	0.9	
Pirates					462	0.3	0.0
Team Todenhöfer					380	0.2	
Volt					332	0.2	
LIEBE					186	0.1	
Gesundheitsforschung					181	0.1	0.0
LfK					128	0.1	
NPD					122	0.1	▼0.1
ÖDP					99	0.1	0.0
V-Partei3					87	0.1	0.0
Humanists					80	0.1	0.0
Bündnis C					69	0.0	
du.					52	0.0	
PdF					37	0.0	
LKR					28	0.0	
MLPD					14	0.0	0.0
DKP					11	0.0	0.0
SGP					8	0.0	0.0
Informal votes		1,101			1,024		
Total valid votes		155,417			155,494		
Turnout		156,518	78.1	▲2.1			
CDU hold	Majority	12,754	8.2	▼12.8			

=== 2017 election ===
Federal election (2017): Hochsauerlandkreis
Notes:	Blue background denotes the winner of the electorate vote. Pink background denotes a candidate elected from their party list. Yellow background denotes an electorate win by a list member, or other incumbent. A ✓ or ✗ denotes status of any incumbent, win or lose respectively.						
Party	Candidate	Votes	%	±%	Party votes	%	±%
CDU	✓ Patrick Sensburg	73,185	48.0	▼8.2	63,651	41.7	▼8.0
SPD	Dirk Wiese	41,047	26.9	▼3.0	34,865	22.8	▼5.2
FDP	Carl-Julius Cronenberg	12,893	8.4	▲6.5	21,919	14.3	▲9.3
AfD	Hans-Martin Schaefer	11,115	7.3		12,216	8.0	▲4.6
Greens	Annika Neumeister	6,476	4.2	0.0	7,198	4.7	▼0.1
Left	Reinhard Prange	6,452	4.2	▲0.1	8,183	5.4	▼0.7
Tierschutzpartei					930	0.6	
PARTEI					906	0.6	▲0.4
FW	Christa Hudyma	1,447	0.9	▲0.5	841	0.6	▼0.2
Pirates					530	0.3	▼1.6
NPD					324	0.2	▼0.6
AD-DEMOKRATEN					268	0.2	
Gesundheitsforschung					156	0.1	
Volksabstimmung					141	0.1	▼0.1
ÖDP					139	0.1	0.0
V-Partei³					121	0.1	
DM					119	0.1	
BGE					100	0.1	
DiB					98	0.1	
Die Humanisten					47	0.0	
MLPD					47	0.0	0.0
DKP					13	0.0	
SGP					2	0.0	0.0
Informal votes		1,399			1,200		
Total valid votes		152,615			152,814		
Turnout		154,014	76.0	▲2.3			
CDU hold	Majority	32,138	21.1	▼5.1			

=== 2013 election ===
Federal election (2013): Hochsauerlandkreis
Notes:	Blue background denotes the winner of the electorate vote. Pink background denotes a candidate elected from their party list. Yellow background denotes an electorate win by a list member, or other incumbent. A ✓ or ✗ denotes status of any incumbent, win or lose respectively.						
Party	Candidate	Votes	%	±%	Party votes	%	±%
CDU	✓ Patrick Sensburg	83,952	56.1	▲4.4	74,530	49.7	▲7.7
SPD	Dirk Wiese	44,682	29.9	▲3.2	42,054	28.0	▲3.6
Greens	Antonius Becker	6,308	4.2	▼1.1	7,161	4.8	▼1.5
Left	Beate Raberg	6,159	4.1	▼2.1	7,055	4.7	▼2.0
AfD					5,140	3.4	
Pirates		3,280	2.2		2,940	2.0	▲0.6
FDP	Hans-Werner Ehrenberg	2,878	1.9	▼7.2	7,625	5.1	▼11.2
NPD		1,708	1.1	▲0.1	1,269	0.8	0.0
FW		637	0.4		533	0.4	
PARTEI					359	0.2	
Volksabstimmung					319	0.2	▲0.1
PRO					278	0.2	
ÖDP					173	0.1	0.0
REP					160	0.1	▼0.1
Nichtwahler					131	0.1	
Party of Reason					88	0.1	
RRP					85	0.1	▼0.1
BIG					43	0.0	
PSG					39	0.0	0.0
Die Rechte					22	0.0	
MLPD					22	0.0	0.0
BüSo					20	0.0	0.0
Informal votes		2,123			1,681		
Total valid votes		149,604			150,046		
Turnout		151,727	73.7	▲1.0			
CDU hold	Majority	39,270	26.2	▲1.1			

=== 2009 election ===
Federal election (2009): Hochsauerlandkreis
Notes:	Blue background denotes the winner of the electorate vote. Pink background denotes a candidate elected from their party list. Yellow background denotes an electorate win by a list member, or other incumbent. A ✓ or ✗ denotes status of any incumbent, win or lose respectively.						
Party	Candidate	Votes	%	±%	Party votes	%	±%
CDU	Patrick Sensburg	77,687	51.7	▼6.0	63,133	41.9	▼4.7
SPD	Karsten Rudolph	40,010	26.6	▼7.5	36,741	24.4	▼9.2
FDP	Hans-Werner Ehrenberg	13,753	9.1	▲6.7	24,530	16.3	▲6.6
Left	Rüdiger Sagel	9,362	6.2	▲3.3	10,064	6.7	▲3.1
Greens	Heiko M. Kosow	7,966	5.3	▲3.3	9,460	6.3	▲2.2
Pirates					2,008	1.3	
NPD	Daniela Wegener	1,537	1.0	▲0.3	1,223	0.8	▲0.2
FAMILIE					910	0.6	▲0.1
Tierschutzpartei					809	0.5	▲0.1
RENTNER					601	0.4	
REP					306	0.2	▼0.2
RRP					206	0.1	
Volksabstimmung					146	0.1	0.0
Centre					121	0.1	0.0
ÖDP					112	0.1	
DVU					96	0.1	
PSG					26	0.0	0.0
MLPD					25	0.0	0.0
BüSo					23	0.0	0.0
Informal votes		1,927			1,702		
Total valid votes		150,315			150,540		
Turnout		152,242	72.7	▼6.7			
CDU hold	Majority	37,677	25.1	▲1.5			

=== 2005 election ===
Federal election (2005): Hochsauerlandkreis
Notes:	Blue background denotes the winner of the electorate vote. Pink background denotes a candidate elected from their party list. Yellow background denotes an electorate win by a list member, or other incumbent. A ✓ or ✗ denotes status of any incumbent, win or lose respectively.						
Party	Candidate	Votes	%	±%	Party votes	%	±%
CDU	✓ Friedrich Merz	94,975	57.7	▲4.0	76,009	46.6	▼9.3
SPD	Dagmar Schmidt	56,141	34.1	▼2.8	54,867	33.6	▼0.48
Left	Dietmar Schwalm	4,802	2.9	▲2.1	5,864	3.6	▲2.9
FDP	Rolf Brand	4,006	2.4	▼2.4	15,734	9.6	▲0.6
Greens	Matthias Schulte-Huermann	4,006	2.4	▼2.4	15,734	9.6	▲0.6
NPD	Michael Hoffmann	1,245	0.8		1,054	0.6	▲0.5
Familie					705	0.5	▲0.1
Tierschutzpartei					649	0.4	▲0.1
REP					605	0.4	
GRAUEN					355	0.2	▲0.1
PBC					144	0.1	
From Now on... Democracy Through Referendum					144	0.1	
Centre					86	0.0	
Socialist Equality Party					62	0.0	
BüSo					42	0.0	
MLPD					37	0.0	0.0
Informal votes		2,851			4,302		
Total valid votes		164,510			163,059		
Turnout		167,361	79.4	▼2.6			
CDU hold	Majority	38,834	23.6				

Bundestag
Preceded by Potsdam – Potsdam-Mittelmark II – Teltow-Fläming II	Constituency represented by the chancellor 2025-	Incumbent
