= Carl-Julius Cronenberg =

German politician (FDP)

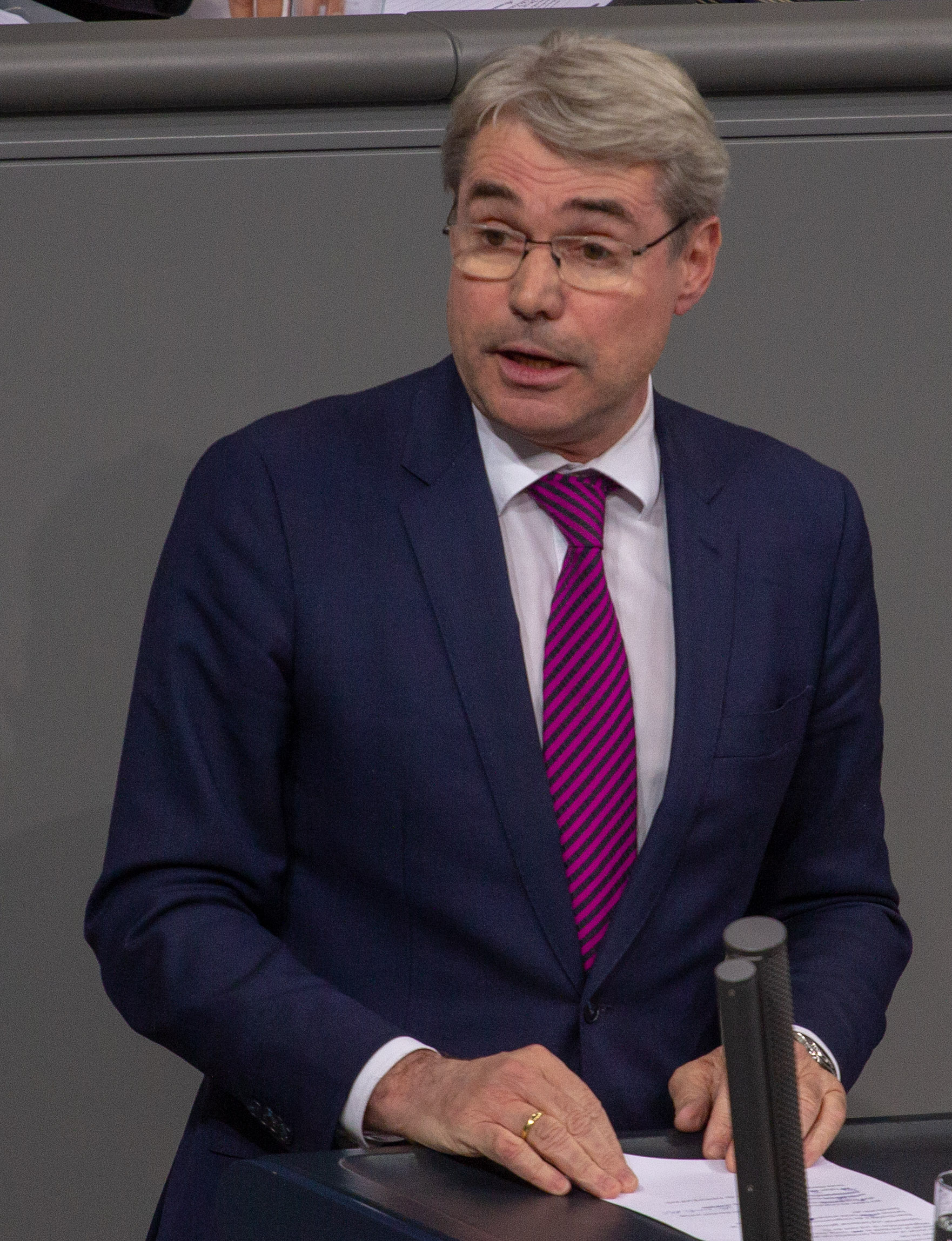
- Cronenberg in 2019

Member of the Bundestag for North Rhine-Westphalia
- In office 24 October 2017 – 2025
- Constituency: FDP List

Personal details
- Born: 30 July 1962 (age 63) Arnsberg, West Germany
- Party: Free Democratic Party
- Children: 3

Carl-Julius Cronenberg (born 30 July 1962) is a German politician of the Free Democratic Party (FDP) who served as a member of the Bundestag from the state of North Rhine-Westphalia from 2017 to 2025.

== Early life and career ==
Cronenberg studied economics in Lausanne. Since 1991 he has been managing partner of Julius Cronenberg Sophienhammer, JCS, based in Arnsberg-Müschede.

== Political career ==
For the 2017 federal elections, Cronenberg competed in the Hochsauerlandkreis constituency and finally moved into the 19th German Bundestag via the North Rhine-Westphalia state list of the FDP.

In parliament, Cronenberg was a member of the Committee on Labour and Social Affairs and a deputy for the Committee on European Union Affairs. In addition to his committee assignments, he was a member of the German delegation to the Franco-German Parliamentary Assembly since 2022.
