= Tino Sorge =

German politician

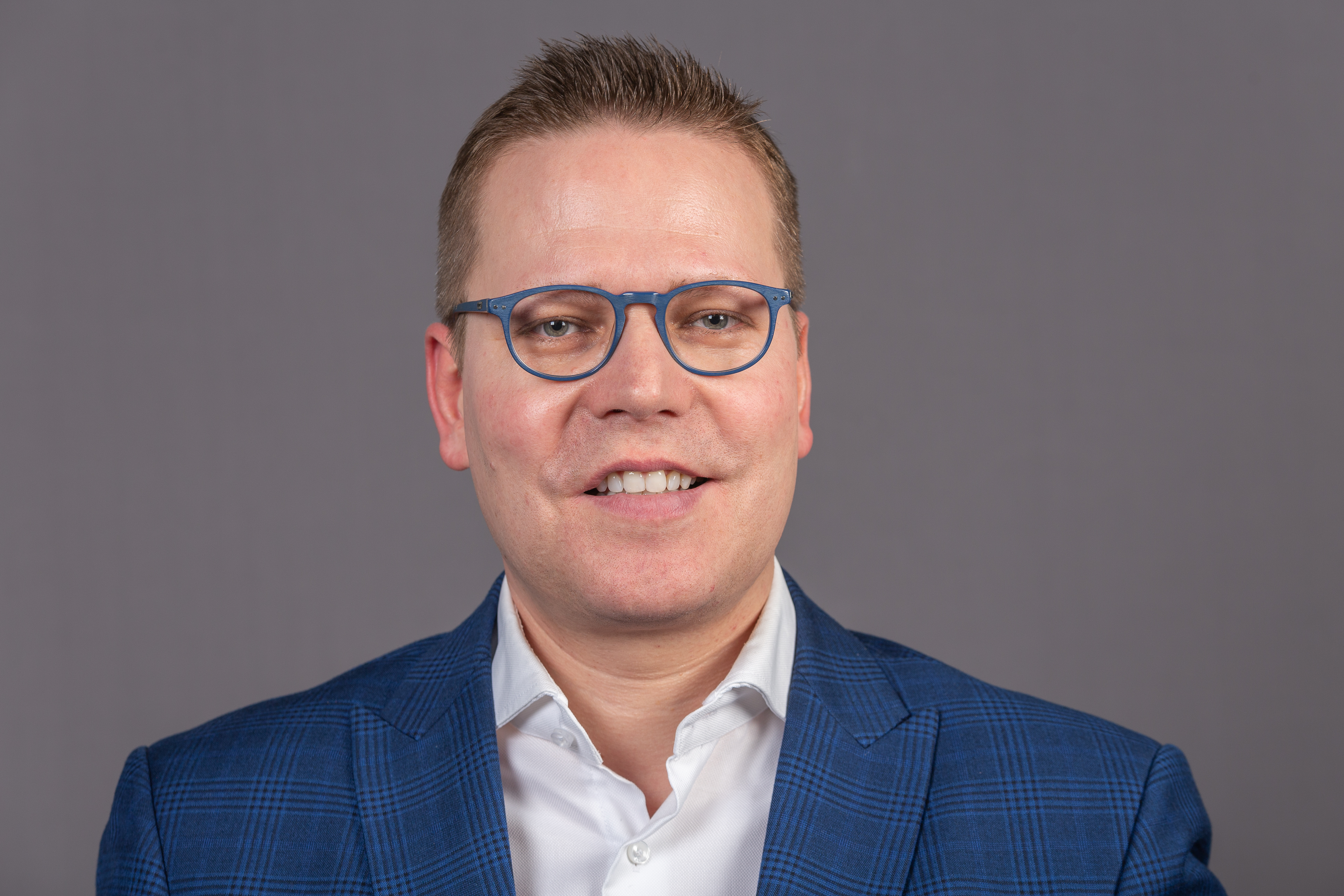
- Sorge in 2020

Member of the Bundestag for Magdeburg
- Incumbent
- Assumed office 22 October 2013
- Preceded by: Rosemarie Hein

Personal details
- Born: 4 March 1975 (age 51) Ilmenau, East Germany (now Germany)
- Party: CDU
- Education: University of Jena; Martin Luther University of Halle-Wittenberg; University of Lyon

Tino Sorge (born 4 March 1975) is a German lawyer and politician of the Christian Democratic Union (CDU) who has been serving as a member of the Bundestag from the state of Saxony-Anhalt since 2013.

In addition to his work in parliament, Sorge served as a Parliamentary State Secretary at the German Ministry of Health in the government of Chancellor Friedrich Merz from 2025 to 2026.

== Political career ==
Sorge first became a member of the Bundestag in the 2013 German federal election, representing the Magdeburg district. From 2013 to 2025, he was a member of the Health Committee. Following the 2021 elections, Sorge became his parliamentary group’s spokesperson for health policy.

In addition to his committee assignments, Sorge is part of the der German-American Parliamentary Friendship Group, the German-Chinese Parliamentary Friendship Group, and the German-Russian Parliamentary Friendship Group.

== Political positions ==
In June 2017, Sorge voted against his parliamentary group's majority and in favor of Germany's introduction of same-sex marriage.

Ahead of the Christian Democrats’ leadership election, Sorge publicly endorsed in 2020 Jens Spahn to succeed Annegret Kramp-Karrenbauer as the party's chair.

== Controversy ==
In 2022, German tabloid Bild reported Sorge was absent from parliament on several session days in September 2020 and attended an intensive course at a hunting school during this time.
