= Rolf Koltzsch =

German politician (1928–2023)

Member of the Bundestag for Herford – Minden-Lübbecke II
- In office 18 February 1987 – 10 November 1994
- Preceded by: Heinz Landré
- Succeeded by: Wolfgang Spanier

Personal details
- Born: 16 July 1928 Leipzig, Saxony, Germany
- Died: 15 September 2023 (aged 95)
- Party: SPD
- Occupation: Locksmith

Rolf Koltzsch (16 July 1928 – 15 September 2023) was a German locksmith and politician. A member of the Social Democratic Party, he served in the Bundestag from 1987 to 1994.

Koltzsch died on 15 September 2023, at the age of 95.
