= Rosemarie Hein =

German politician (1953–2025)

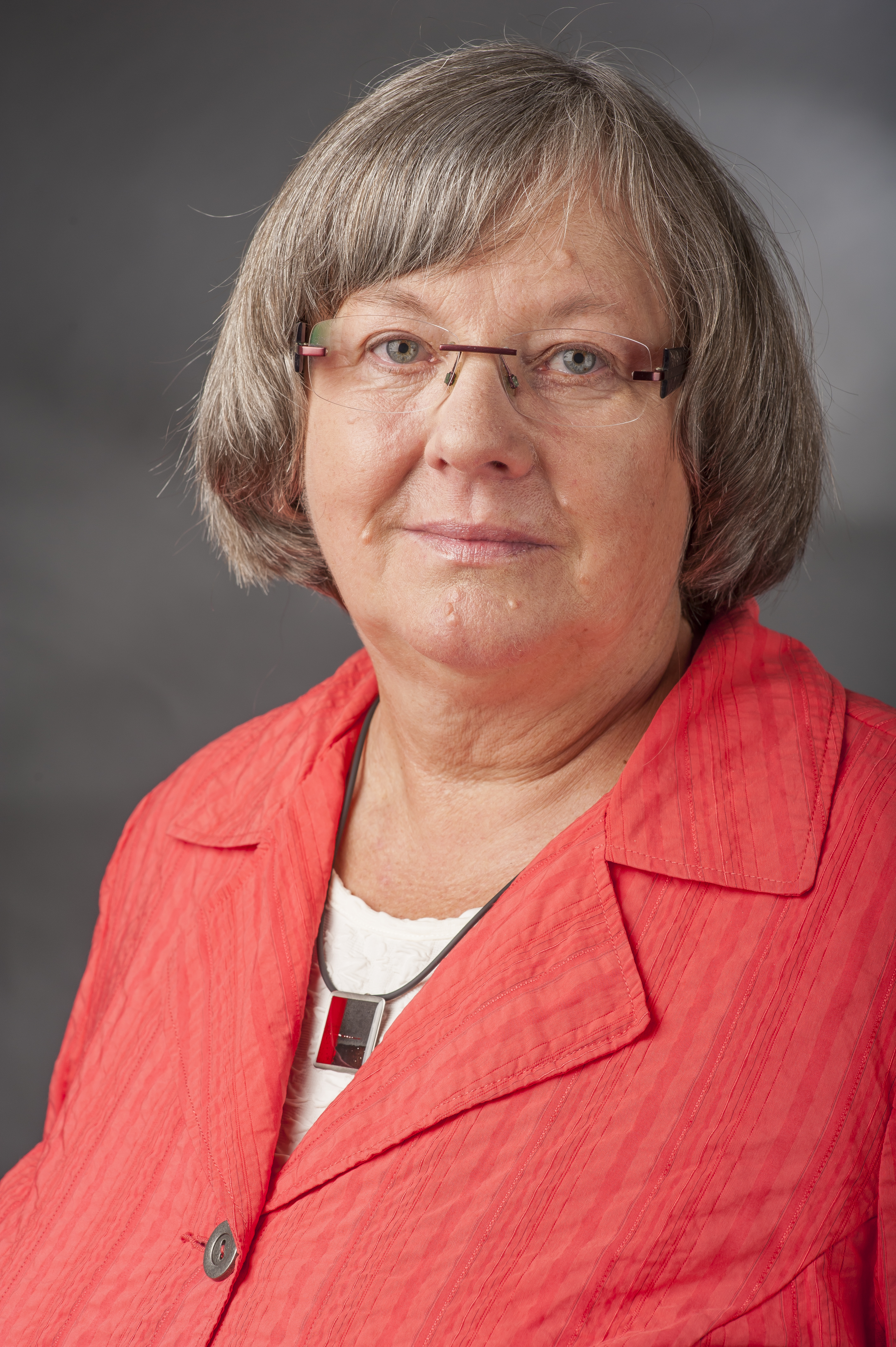

Member of Bundestag
- Incumbent
- Assumed office September, 2009

Personal details
- Born: Anna Gertrud Rosemarie Hein; 17 January 1953 Leipzig, East Germany
- Died: 15 February 2025 (aged 72)
- Party: The Left
- Occupation: Politician
- Website: https://www.rosemarie-hein.de/aktuelles/

Anna Gertrud Rosemarie Hein (17 January 1953 – 15 February 2025) was a German politician who was education spokeswoman for the Left Party. From 1990 to 2006, she was a member of the Landtag of Saxony-Anhalt, and in 2009 she became a member of the Bundestag.

== Background ==
After completing school in Hennigsdorf in 1971, Hein began studying education at the then College of Educate in Dresden, from which she graduated in 1975 as a teacher of German and art. She spent the next five years working at the extended secondary school in Oschersleben.

From 1982 to 1986, Hein completed a doctorate in social science, writing a thesis on the subject of Visual art in the DDR for world peace: positions and problems in the Seventies and Eighties.

Hein was married and has two daughters. She died on 15 February 2025, at the age of 72.

== Political career ==
Hein entered the Socialist Unity Party in 1976. From 1980 to 1982 she worked in the district leadership for Oschersleben. After re-unification she became District Chair of the PDS in Magdeburg, and that summer was elected as deputy national chair. She carried out this function until 1995. From 1997-2005 she was state chair of the PDS in Saxony-Anhalt. Since June 2007 she has been part of the party leadership of Die Linke.

In October 1990, she was first elected to the state parliament of Saxony-Anhalt. Her political focus was on education policy.

In June 2004, she was elected to the Magdeburg city council and was involved here mainly for the education policies of the city.

In the federal elections of September 2009, she was elected with 32.0% of the vote as a direct candidate in the constituency of Magdeburg (constituency 70). Rosemarie died on 15 February 2025, age 72.
