= Martin Kröber =

German politician (born 1992)

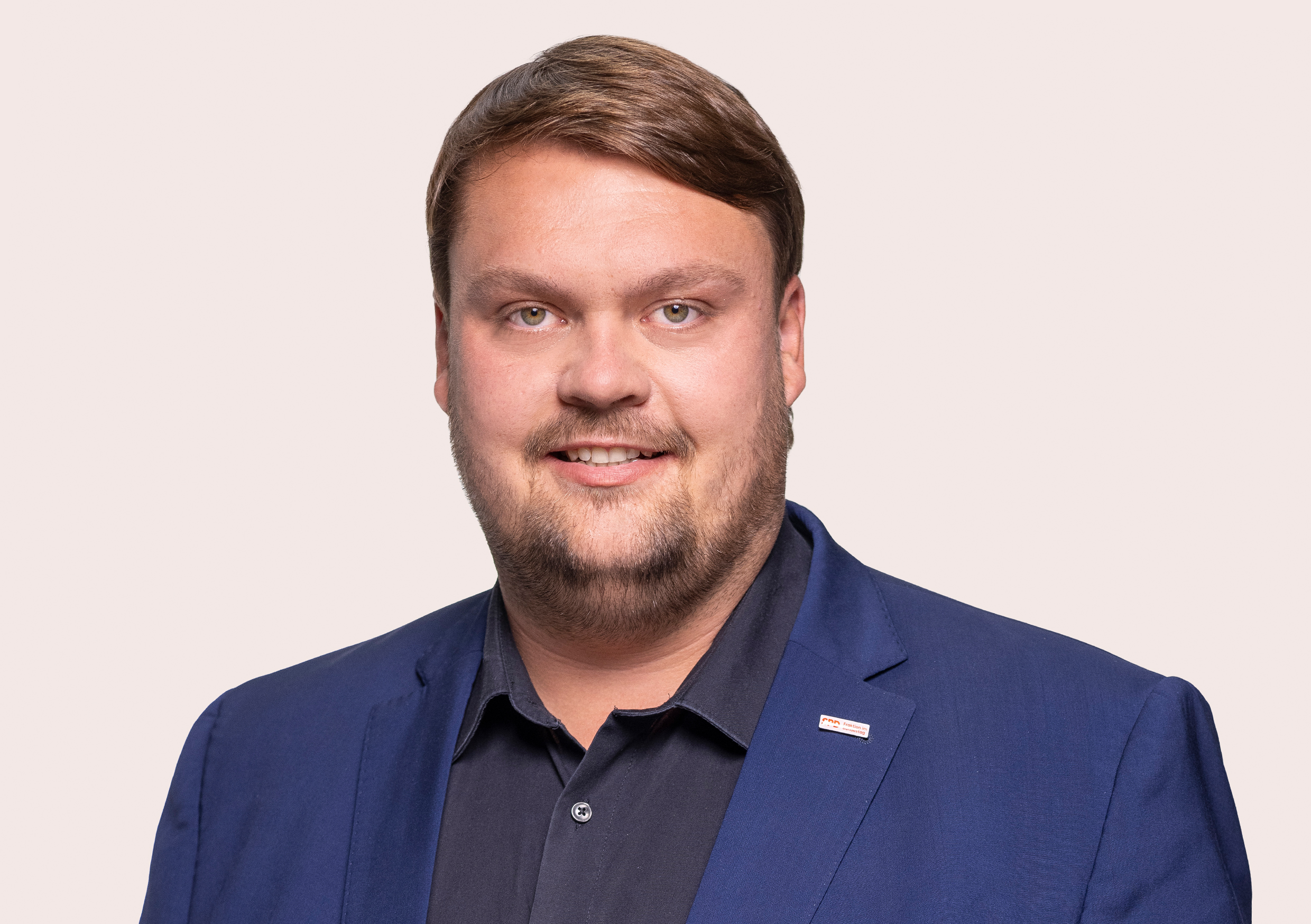

Member of the Bundestag
- Incumbent
- Assumed office 2021

Personal details
- Born: 12 February 1992 (age 34) Halberstadt, Germany
- Party: SPD

Martin Kröber (born 12 February 1992) is a German trade unionist and politician of the Social Democratic Party (SPD) who has been serving as a member of the Bundestag since 2021.

== Political career ==
Kröber was elected directly to the Bundestag in 2021, representing the Magdeburg district. In parliament, he has since been serving on the Committee on Transport and the Committee on Petitions.

Within his parliamentary group, Kröber belongs to the Parliamentary Left, a left-wing movement.

== Other activities ==
- Federal Network Agency for Electricity, Gas, Telecommunications, Posts and Railway (BNetzA), Member of the Rail Infrastructure Advisory Council (since 2022)
- IG Metall, Member (since 2010)
- Railway and Transport Union (EVG), Member
