= Stefan Schwartze =

German politician

Member of the Bundestag
- Incumbent
- Assumed office 2009

Personal details
- Born: 23 May 1974 (age 51) Bad Oeynhausen, West Germany (now Germany)
- Party: SPD

Stefan Schwartze (born 23 May 1974) is a German politician of the Social Democratic Party (SPD) who has been serving as a member of the Bundestag from the state of North Rhine-Westphalia since 2009.

In addition to his parliamentary work, Schwartze has been serving as Commissioner on Patients' Rights at the Federal Ministry of Health in the government of Chancellor Olaf Scholz since 2022.

== Political career ==
Schwartze became a member of the Bundestag in the 2009 German federal election, representing the Herford – Minden-Lübbecke II district. He is a member of the Committee on Petitions and the Committee on Family, Senior Citizens, Women and Youth. In this capacity, he serves as his parliamentary group's spokesperson for youth policy.

In the negotiations to form a so-called traffic light coalition of the SPD, the Green Party and the Free Democratic Party (FDP) following the 2021 German elections, Schwartze was part of his party's delegation in the working group on children, youth and families, co-chaired by Serpil Midyatli, Katrin Göring-Eckardt and Stephan Thomae.

Within the SPD parliamentary group, Schwartze belongs to the Parliamentary Left, a left-wing movement.

== Other activities ==
- IG Metall, Member
