= Frank Pasemann =

German politician

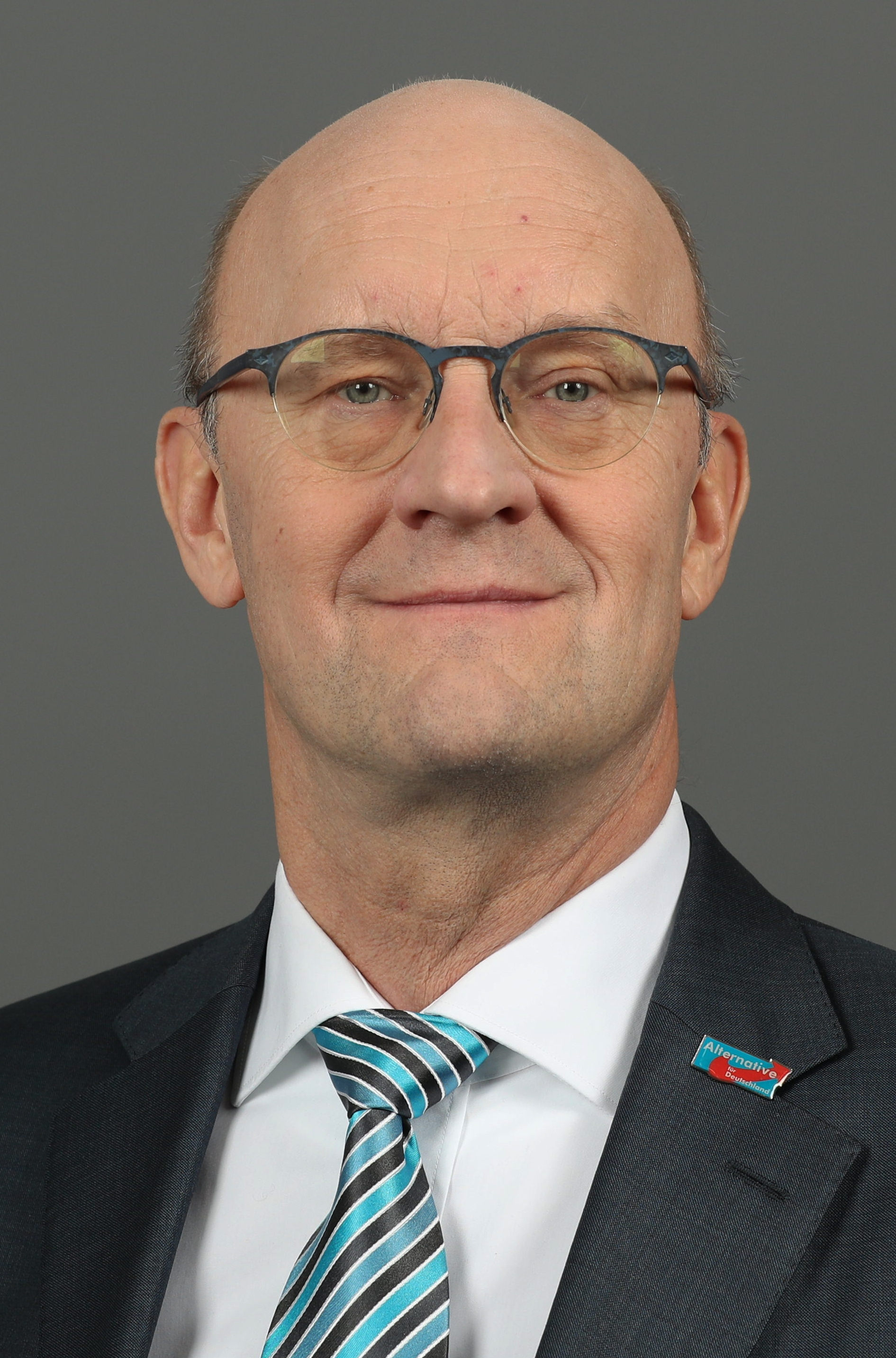
- Pasemann in 2020

Member of the Bundestag
- In office 2017–2021

Personal details
- Born: 21 April 1960 (age 64); Magdeburg, East Germany

Frank Pasemann (born 21 April 1960) is a German politician and former member of the far-right Alternative for Germany (AfD) party. He was expelled from the party in 2020. Pasemann served as a member of the Bundestag from the state of Saxony-Anhalt from 2017 to 2021.

== Biography ==
Pasemann is part of the ultra-nationalistic group Der Flügel within AfD. According to Süddeutsche Zeitung even if Pasemann was not that present in public, he is described by insiders as an important link to right-wing extremists outside the AfD.

Pasemann was member of the GDR Liberal Democratic Party of Germany and later of the Free Democratic Party. Later he switched to AfD. He became member of the Bundestag after the 2017 German federal election. He is a member of the Committee for Family, Senior Citizens, Women and Youth. In August 2020, Pasemann was expelled from the AfD by the Landesschiedsgericht (arbitration tribunal) of the party branch in the state of Saxony-Anhalt. Pasemann was accused of antisemitism and other misdemeanors.

An AfD district association in Saxony-Anhalt presented Paseman as a non-party direct candidate for the mayoral election in April 2022 in Magdeburg.
