= Burkhard Lischka =

German lawyer and politician

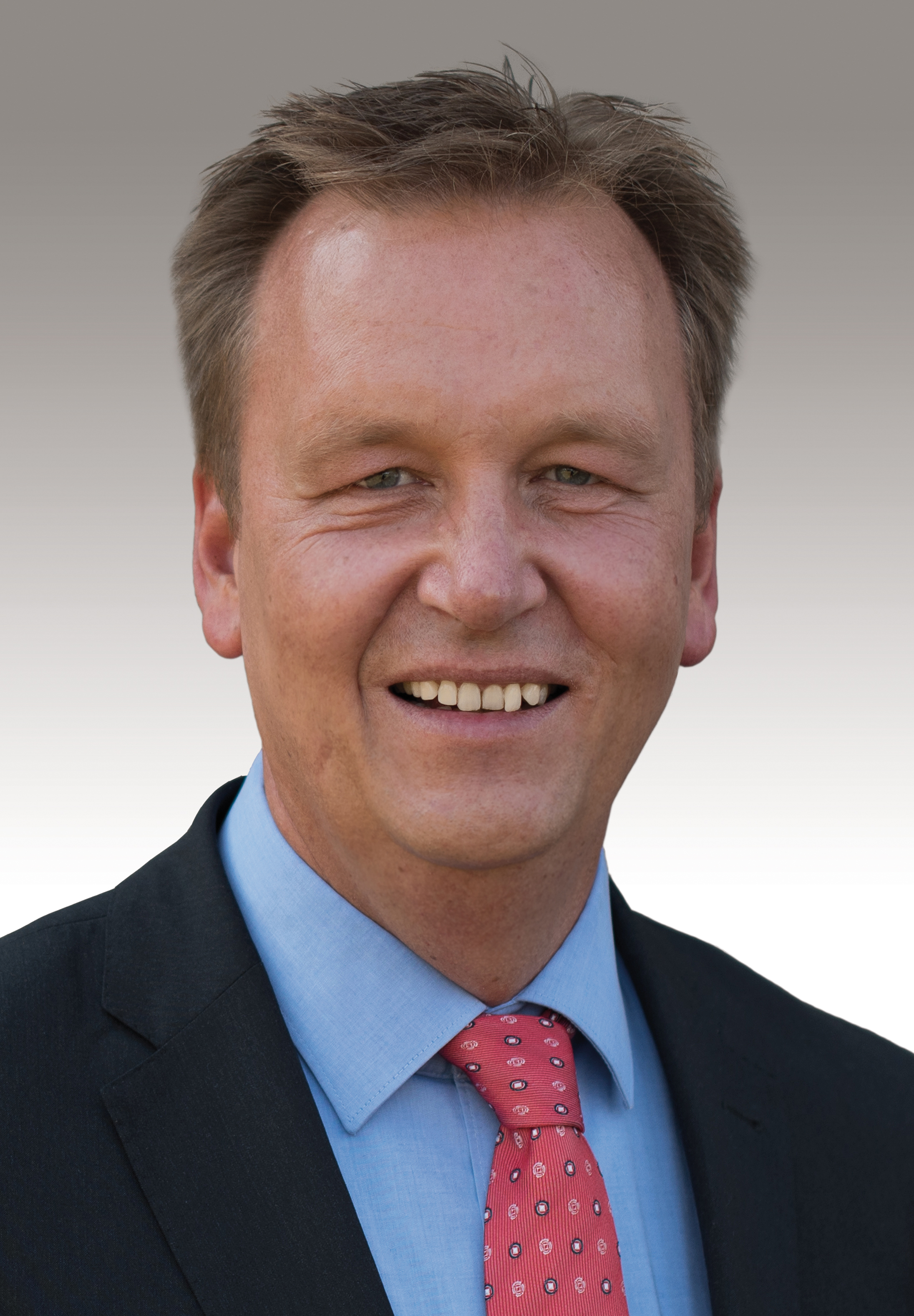

Member of the Bundestag
- In office 2009–2019

Personal details
- Born: 1 February 1965 (age 61) Marsberg, West Germany (now Germany)
- Party: German: Social Democratic Party; EU: Party of European Socialists

Burkhard Lischka (born 1 February 1965) is a German lawyer and politician of the Social Democratic Party of Germany (SPD) who served as a member of the Bundestag from 2009 until 2019.

== Political career ==
Lischka served as Secretary of State in the Ministry of Justice in the State of Saxony-Anhalt from 2006 to 2009.

Lischka was a member of the German Bundestag from the 2009 elections. In parliament, he served as a member of the Committee on Home Affairs and of the German Parliamentary Committee investigating the NSA spying scandal. He was also a member of the Parliamentary Oversight Panel (PKGr), which provides parliamentary oversight of Germany's intelligence services BND, BfV and MAD. From 2014 until 2019, he was a member of the parliamentary body in charge of appointing judges to the Highest Courts of Justice, namely the Federal Court of Justice (BGH), the Federal Administrative Court (BVerwG), the Federal Fiscal Court (BFH), the Federal Labour Court (BAG), and the Federal Social Court (BSG).

From 2011 until 2019, Lischka was part of his parliamentary group's leadership under successive chairs Frank-Walter Steinmeier (2009–2013), Thomas Oppermann (2013–2017) and Andrea Nahles (2017–2019). Within the parliamentary group, he was a member of the working groups on municipal policy (2009–2013), relations with Afghanistan and Pakistan (2009–2013), legal affairs (2009–2014) and internal affairs (since 2014). He also belonged to the Parliamentary Left, a left-wing movement.

In addition to his committee assignments, Lischka served as deputy chairman of the Parliamentary Friendship Group for Relations with Arabic-Speaking States in the Middle East between 2009 and 2013, which is in charge of maintaining inter-parliamentary relations with Bahrain, Irak, Yemen, Jordan, Qatar, Kuwait, Lebanon, Oman, Saudi Arabia, Syria, United Arab Emirates, and the Palestinian territories.

In the negotiations to form a fourth coalition government under the leadership of Chancellor Angela Merkel following the 2017 federal elections, Lischka was part of the working group on internal and legal affairs, led by Thomas de Maizière, Stephan Mayer and Heiko Maas.

In early 2019, Lischka announced that he would resign from active politics by mid-2019 and instead return to his law practice.

== Other activities ==
=== Corporate boards ===
- Parkraum GmbH Magdeburg, Member of the Supervisory Board
- Magdeburger Hafen GmbH, Member of the supervisory board (-2014)

=== Non-profits ===
- Amnesty International, Member
- Notarbund Sachsen-Anhalt, Member
