= Tim Ostermann =

German politician

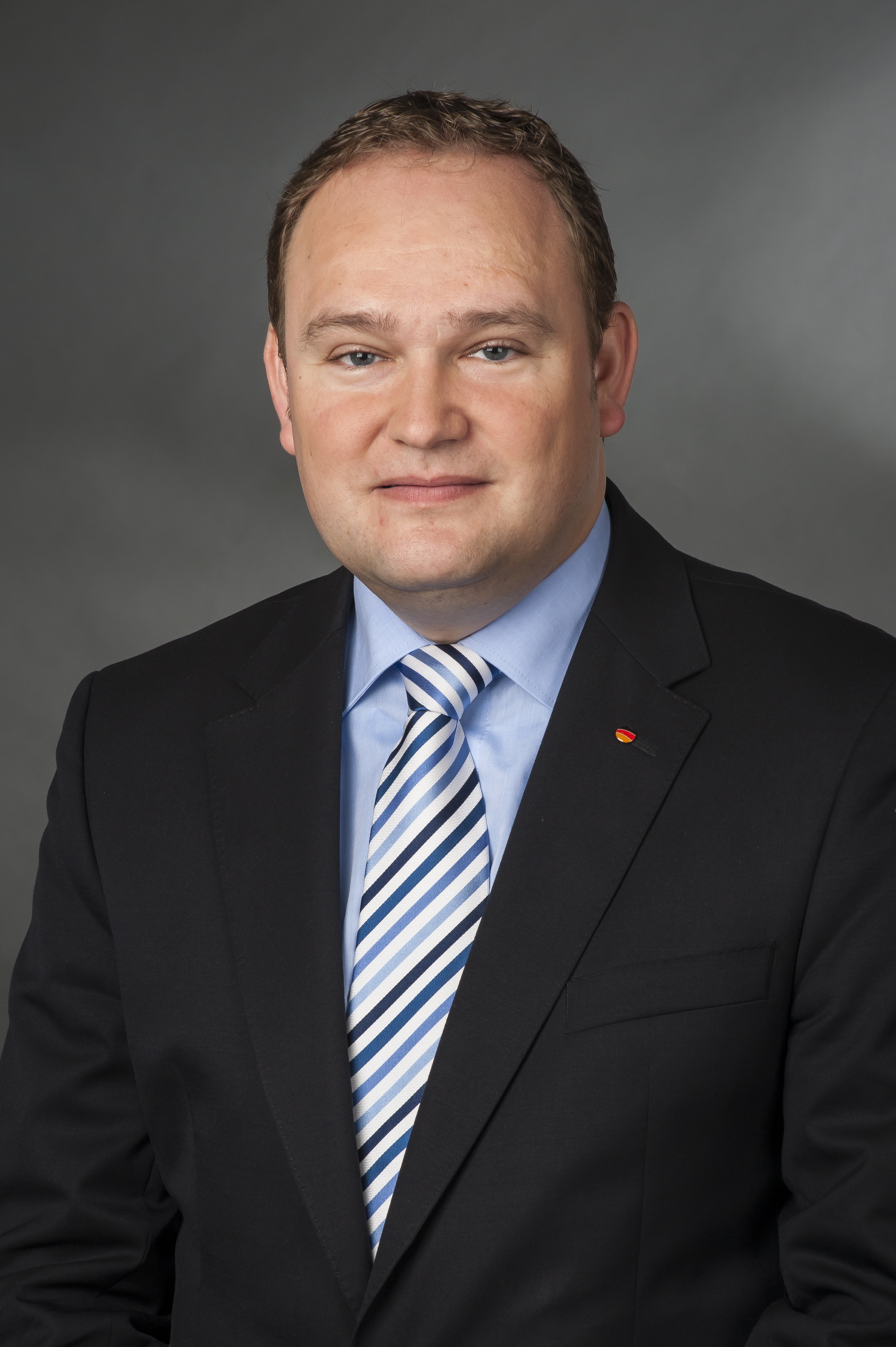
- Tim Ostermann in 2014

Member of the Bundestag
- Incumbent
- Assumed office 1 May 2021

Personal details
- Born: 16 June 1979 (age 47) Bünde, West Germany (now Germany)
- Party: CDU
- Education: Bielefeld University

Tim Ostermann (born 16 June 1979) is a German politician of the Christian Democratic Union (CDU) who has served as a member of the Bundestag from the state of North Rhine-Westphalia from 2013 till 2017 and again since 2021.

== Political career ==
Gohl became a member of the Bundestag in 2021 when he replaced Oliver Wittke who had resigned. In parliament, he has since been serving on the Committee on European Union Affairs.
