= List of members of the 20th Bundestag =

20th Bundestag
←	19th	21st	→
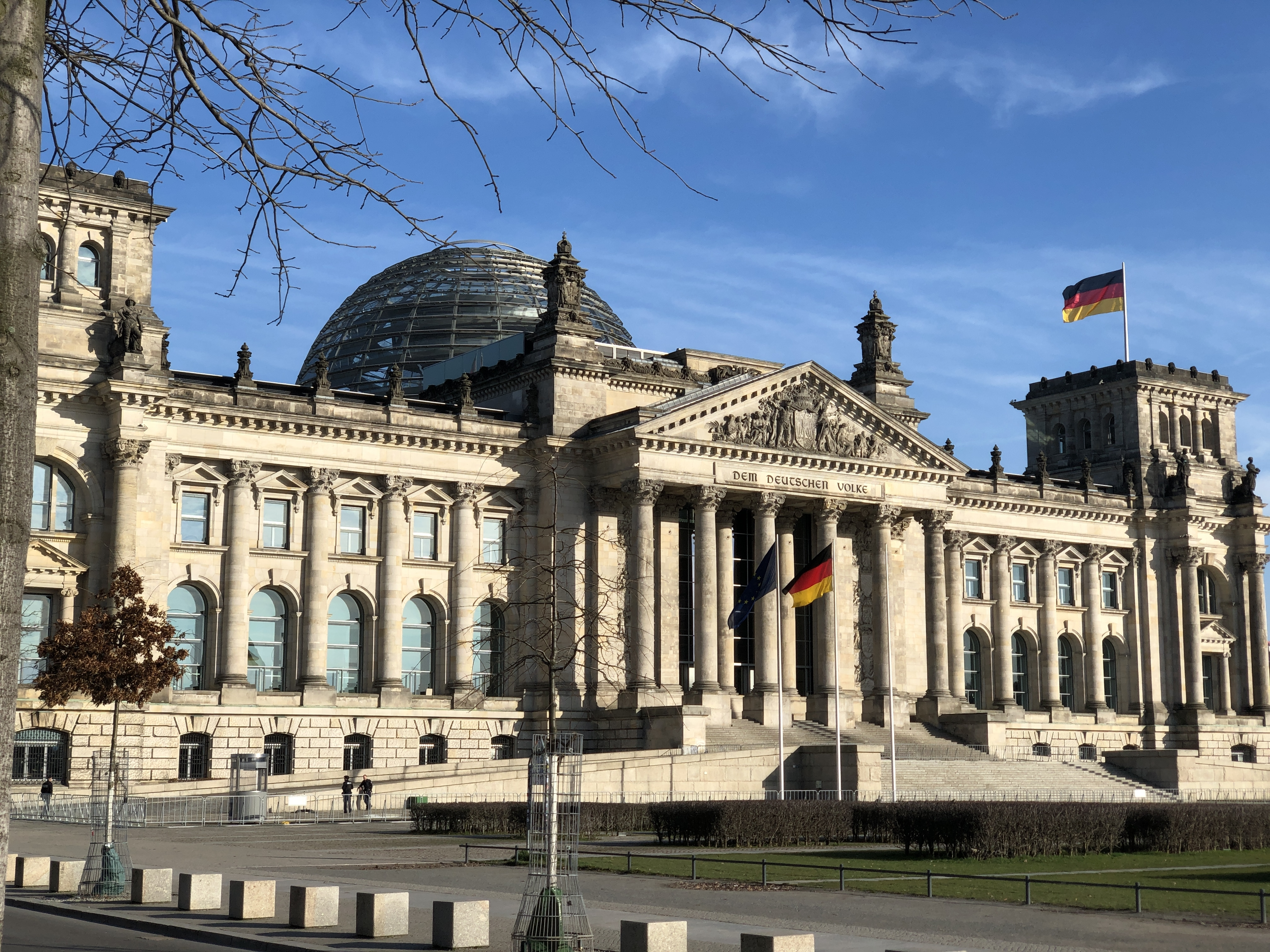
- Reichstag building in 2020

Overview
- Legislative body: Bundestag
- Jurisdiction: Germany
- Meeting place: Reichstag building, Berlin
- Term: 26 October 2021 – 25 March 2025
- Election: 26 September 2021

Bundestag
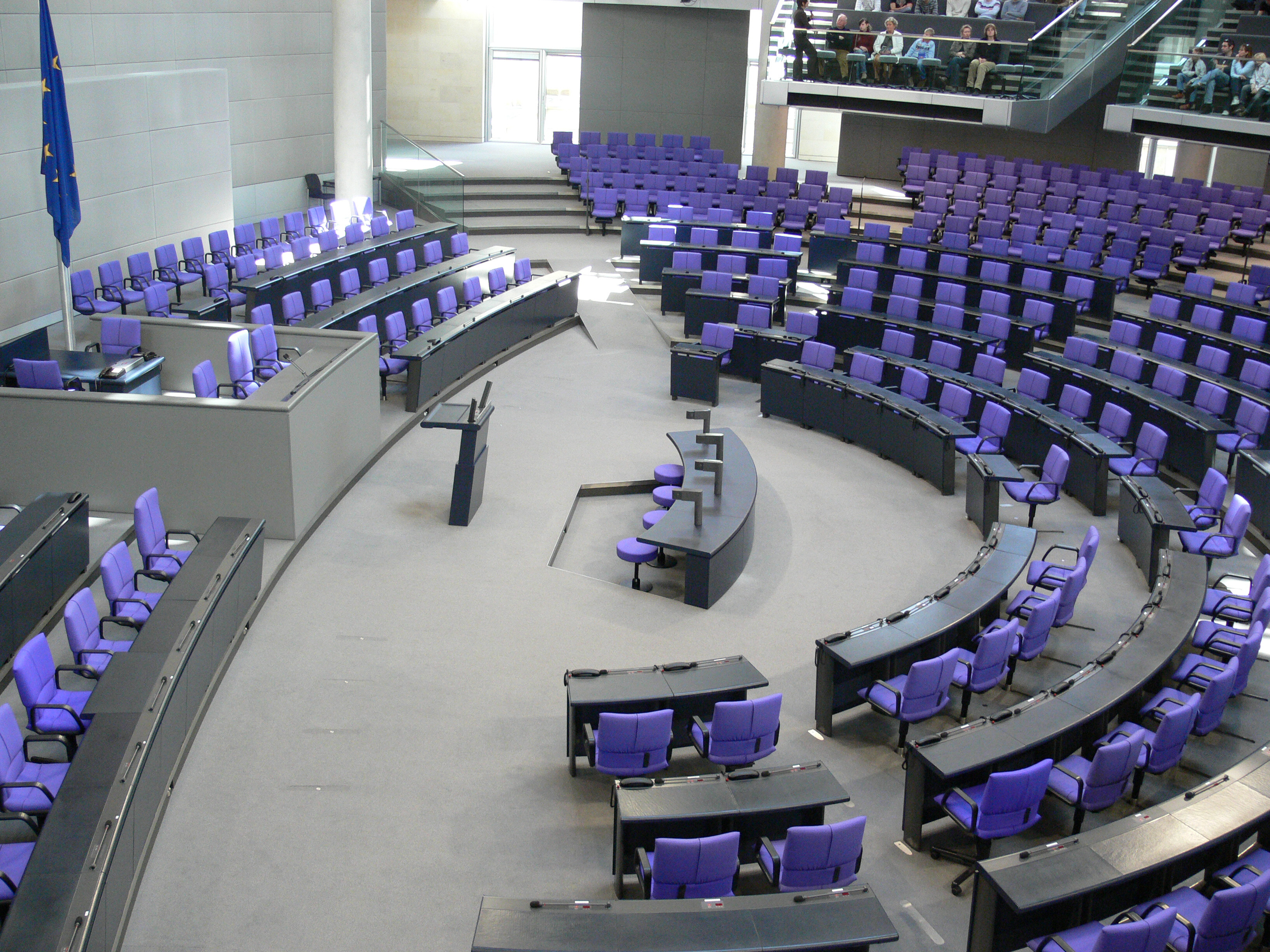
- Members: 733 (prev. 736)
- President: Bärbel Bas (SPD)

This is a list of members of the 20th Bundestag, the federal parliament of Germany. The 20th Bundestag was elected in the 26 September 2021 federal election, and was constituted in its first session on 26 October 2021. The 21st Bundestag succeeded the 20th Bundestag on 25 March 2025.

The 20th Bundestag was the largest in history with 733 members, 135 seats larger than its minimum size of 598. Originally, it had 736 and comprised 206 members of the Social Democratic Party of Germany (SPD), 197 members of the CDU/CSU, 118 members of Alliance 90/The Greens (GRÜNE), 92 members of the Free Democratic Party (FDP), 83 members of the Alternative for Germany (AfD), and 39 members of The Left (LINKE), as well as one member of the South Schleswig Voters' Association, who sits as a non-attached member.

Matthias Helferich, who was elected for the AfD, withdrew from its parliamentary faction before the first session of the Bundestag. Deputies Johannes Huber and Uwe Witt also left in December 2021. Robert Farle quit the AfD faction in September 2022, as did Joana Cotar who also resigned from her former party in November. Thomas Lütze defected from LINKE to the SPD in October 2023, as did Sahra Wagenknecht, Amira Mohamed Ali, and eight others who joined Wagenknecht's namesake faction Sahra Wagenknecht Alliance (BSW) while staying in the LINKE seats. The LINKE group dissolved on 6 December after announcing earlier in November that it could no longer form a parliamentary faction for falling below the 37-member minimum. As a result, the AfD and SPD groups consisted of 78 and 207 members respectively. The BSW was officially founded as a party on 8 January 2024.

After the decision to dissolve the LINKE faction, the 28 remaining members of their party applied for and received group status on 2 February 2024. The ten members from the BSW, who had previously left LINKE, were also recognized as a group on the same day. Thomas Seitz resigned from the AfD and its faction at the end of March 2024. Melis Sekmen also defected, but from GRÜNE to the CDU in July 2024. Dirk Spaniel also quit the AfD in October, followed by Volker Wissing, formerly from the FDP, in November to continue as a cabinet minister. Witt was a member of the Centre Party from January to August 2022. He later joined Bündnis Deutschland on 23 December 2024. Spaniel became the Values Union's first Bundestag member at the end of January 2025.

Due to irregularities in the 2021 federal election in Berlin, there was a partial repeat of the election on 11 February 2024 in around 20% of the capital's electoral districts. With lost votes and lower voter turnout, there was a shift in mandates between the state associations of the SPD, GRÜNE, and LINKE, and the FDP lost a leveling seat, meaning that only 735 Bundestag members, of whom 90 are FDP, now sit. The mandate changes were carried out by a Council of Elders resolution on 4 March. Two CSU mandates were not filled after resignations, in accordance with a since-repealed provision in the Federal Elections Act that no vacant seats won by a party that has overhang seats in a German state may be filled.

The President of the Bundestag was Bärbel Bas (SPD).

== Presidium ==
President		Party	Ballot	Term
President	Bärbel Bas	SPD	576 / 724	26 Oct. 2021 – 25 Mar. 2025
Vice-President	Aydan Özoğuz	SPD	544 / 727	26 Oct. 2021 – 25 Mar. 2025
Vice-President	Yvonne Magwas	CDU/CSU	600 / 727	26 Oct. 2021 – 25 Mar. 2025
Vice-President	Claudia Roth	GRÜNE	565 / 727	26 Oct. 2021 – 8 Dec. 2021
Vice-President	Katrin Göring-Eckardt	GRÜNE	501 / 689	8 Dec. 2021 – 25 Mar. 2025
Vice-President	Wolfgang Kubicki	FDP	564 / 727	26 Oct. 2021 – 25 Mar. 2025
Vice-President	Vacant (Note: The AfD has put forward candidates for vice-president during a total of six ballots occasions during the 20th Bundestag, all of which have failed to reach the required majority.)	AfD	Ballots: 118 / 727; 94 / 689; 95 / 648; 92 / 671; 106 / 664; 100 / 647	N/A
Vice-President	Petra Pau	LINKE	484 / 727	26 Oct. 2021 – 25 Mar. 2025
Source: Bundestag

== Parliamentary groups ==
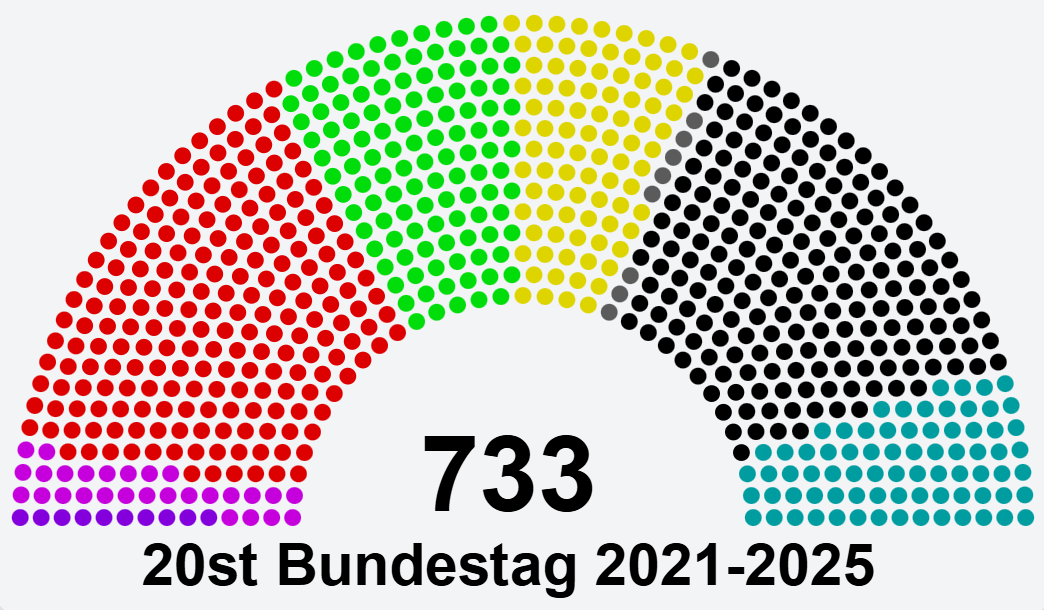

Group	Members		Chairperson(s)	
Group	At election	At dissolution	Chairperson(s)	
Social Democratic Party of Germany (SPD)	206 / 736	207 / 733	Rolf Mützenich	26 Oct. 2021 – 26 February 2025
Social Democratic Party of Germany (SPD)	206 / 736	207 / 733	Lars Klingbeil	26 February 2025 – 5 May 2025
CDU/CSU	197 / 736	196 / 733	Ralph Brinkhaus	26 Oct. 2021 – 15 Feb. 2022
CDU/CSU	197 / 736	196 / 733	Friedrich Merz	15 Feb. 2022 – 5 May 2025
Alliance 90/The Greens (GRÜNE)	118 / 736	117 / 733	Katrin Göring-Eckardt; Anton Hofreiter	26 Oct. 2021 – 7 Dec. 2021
Alliance 90/The Greens (GRÜNE)	118 / 736	117 / 733	Katharina Dröge; Britta Haßelmann	7 Dec. 2021 – 25 Mar. 2025
Free Democratic Party (FDP)	92 / 736	90 / 733	Christian Lindner	26 Oct. 2021 – 8 Dec. 2021
Free Democratic Party (FDP)	92 / 736	90 / 733	Christian Dürr	8 Dec. 2021 – 25 Mar. 2025
Alternative for Germany (AfD)	83 / 736	76 / 733	Alice Weidel; Tino Chrupalla	26 Oct. 2021 – 25 Mar. 2025
The Left (LINKE)	39 / 736	28 / 733	Amira Mohamed Ali	26 Oct. 2021 – 23 Oct. 2023
The Left (LINKE)	39 / 736	28 / 733	Dietmar Bartsch	26 Oct. 2021 – 6 Dec. 2023
The Left (LINKE)	39 / 736	28 / 733	Heidi Reichinnek; Sören Pellmann	19 Feb. 2024 – 25 Mar. 2025
Sahra Wagenknecht Alliance (BSW)	0 / 736	10 / 733	Sahra Wagenknecht	2 Feb. 2024 – 25 Mar. 2025
Non-attached members	1 / 736	9 / 733	–	–
Source: Bundestag

== List of members ==
Image	Name	Date of birth	Party	State	Constituency	Vote %	List #	Member since	Notes	Ref.
	Sanae Abdi	7 July 1986	SPD	North Rhine-Westphalia	Cologne I	27.9%	40th	2021		
	Valentin Abel	7 February 1991	FDP	Baden-Württemberg			12th	2021		
	Knut Abraham	4 June 1966	CDU	Brandenburg			4th	2021		
	Katja Adler	20 May 1974	FDP	Hesse			6th	2021		
	Adis Ahmetovic	27 July 1993	SPD	Lower Saxony	Stadt Hannover I	34.9%	29th	2021		
	Gökay Akbulut	16 November 1982	LINKE	Baden-Württemberg			2nd	2017		
	Ali Al-Dailami	27 December 1981	BSW	Hesse			2nd	2021	Resigned from LINKE on 23 Oct 2023	
	Muhanad Al-Halak	31 July 1989	FDP	Bavaria			14th	2021		
	Reem Alabali-Radovan	1 May 1990	SPD	Mecklenburg-Vorpommern	Schwerin – Ludwigslust-Parchim I – Nordwestmecklenburg I	29.4%	6th	2021		
	Stephan Albani	3 June 1968	CDU	Lower Saxony			11th	2013		
	Renata Alt	27 August 1965	FDP	Baden-Württemberg			7th	2017		
	Norbert Altenkamp	27 July 1972	CDU	Hesse	Main-Taunus	33.3%	17th	2017		
	Philipp Amthor	10 November 1992	CDU	Mecklenburg-Vorpommern			1st	2017		
	Luise Amtsberg	17 October 1984	GRÜNE	Schleswig-Holstein			1st	2013		
	Dagmar Andres	3 December 1969	SPD	North Rhine-Westphalia			18th	2021		
	Niels Annen	6 April 1973	SPD	Hamburg			2nd	2013		
	Johannes Arlt	23 April 1984	SPD	Mecklenburg-Vorpommern	Mecklenburgische Seenplatte II – Landkreis Rostock III	31.1%	5th	2021		
	Christine Aschenberg-Dugnus	22 September 1959	FDP	Schleswig-Holstein			3rd	2009–2013, 2017		
	Andreas Audretsch	25 June 1984	GRÜNE	Berlin			4th	2021		
	Artur Auernhammer	9 March 1963	CSU	Bavaria	Ansbach	38.4%		2004–2005, 2013		
	Peter Aumer	17 April 1976	CSU	Bavaria	Regensburg	35.3%		2009–2013, 2017		
	Maik Außendorf	17 August 1971	GRÜNE	North Rhine-Westphalia			18th	2021		
	Tobias Bacherle	18 October 1994	GRÜNE	Baden-Württemberg			13th	2021		
	Carolin Bachmann	3 September 1988	AfD	Saxony	Mittelsachsen	33.4%		2021		
	Lisa Badum	2 October 1983	GRÜNE	Bavaria			9th	2017		
	Heike Baehrens	21 September 1955	SPD	Baden-Württemberg			13th	2013		
	Dorothee Bär	19 April 1978	CSU	Bavaria	Bad Kissingen	39.1%	2nd	2002		
	Karl Bär	13 March 1985	GRÜNE	Bavaria			12th	2021		
	Annalena Baerbock	15 December 1980	GRÜNE	Brandenburg			1st	2013	Party co-leader (to Jan 2022)	
	Ulrike Bahr	25 April 1964	SPD	Bavaria			16th	2013		
	Daniel Baldy	25 September 1994	SPD	Rhineland-Palatinate	Mainz	24.9%	5th	2021		
	Felix Banaszak	24 October 1989	GRÜNE	North Rhine-Westphalia			6th	2021		
	Nezahat Baradari	15 August 1965	SPD	North Rhine-Westphalia			26th	2019		
	Thomas Bareiß	15 February 1975	CDU	Baden-Württemberg	Zollernalb – Sigmaringen	30.1%		2005		
	Christian Bartelt	16 September 1976	FDP	Mecklenburg-Vorpommern			2nd	2023	Moved up after the resignation of Hagen Reinhold	
	Sören Bartol	4 September 1974	SPD	Hesse	Marburg	36.9%	5th	2002		
	Dietmar Bartsch	31 March 1958	LINKE	Mecklenburg-Vorpommern			1st	1998–2002, 2005	Faction co-leader (to Oct 2023) then leader (Oct–Dec 2023); Group co-leader (from Feb 2024)	
	Alexander Bartz	13 August 1984	SPD	Lower Saxony			25th	2022	Moved up after the resignation of Falko Mohrs	
	Bärbel Bas	3 May 1968	SPD	North Rhine-Westphalia	Duisburg I	40.3%	12th	2009	President of the Bundestag	
	Nicole Bauer	19 March 1987	FDP	Bavaria			7th	2017		
	Christina Baum	21 March 1956	AfD	Baden-Württemberg			8th	2021		
	Bernd Baumann	31 January 1958	AfD	Hamburg			1st	2017		
	Canan Bayram	11 February 1966	GRÜNE	Berlin	Berlin-Friedrichshain-Kreuzberg – Prenzlauer Berg East	37.9%		2017		
	Katharina Beck	13 April 1982	GRÜNE	Hamburg			1st	2021		
	Roger Beckamp	18 July 1975	AfD	North Rhine-Westphalia			8th	2021		
	Holger Becker	15 July 1964	SPD	Thuringia	Jena – Sömmerda – Weimarer Land I	20.1%	5th	2021		
	Jens Beeck	19 September 1969	FDP	Lower Saxony			2nd	2017		
	Lukas Benner	20 February 1996	GRÜNE	North Rhine-Westphalia			26th	2021		
	Jürgen Berghahn	5 July 1960	SPD	North Rhine-Westphalia	Lippe I	30.7%	46th	2021		
	Bengt Bergt	7 May 1982	SPD	Schleswig-Holstein	Segeberg – Stormarn-Mitte	32.0%	9th	2021		
	Marc Bernhard	5 February 1972	AfD	Baden-Württemberg			6th	2017		
	Melanie Bernstein	28 September 1976	CDU	Lower Saxony			6th	2017–2021, 2023	Moved up after the death of Gero Storjohann	
	Peter Beyer	25 December 1970	CDU	North Rhine-Westphalia	Mettmann II	31.3%	28th	2009		
	Marc Biadacz	3 September 1979	CDU	Baden-Württemberg	Böblingen	29.7%		2017		
	Steffen Bilger	16 February 1979	CDU	Baden-Württemberg	Ludwigsburg	29.5%	4th	2009		
	Matthias Birkwald	28 September 1961	LINKE	North Rhine-Westphalia			2nd	2009		
	Jakob Blankenburg	5 July 1997	SPD	Lower Saxony	Lüchow-Dannenberg – Lüneburg	28.2%	15th	2021		
	Andreas Bleck	17 April 1988	AfD	Rhineland-Palatinate			3rd	2017		
	René Bochmann	4 February 1969	AfD	Saxony	Nordsachsen	27.8%	15th	2021		
	Ingo Bodtke	6 June 1965	FDP	Saxony-Anhalt			2nd	2021		
	Peter Boehringer	6 April 1969	AfD	Bavaria			1st	2017		
	Friedhelm Boginski	7 November 1955	FDP	Brandenburg			2nd	2021		
	Gereon Bollmann	20 November 1953	AfD	Schleswig-Holstein			2nd	2021		
	Simone Borchardt	11 September 1967	CDU	Mecklenburg-Vorpommern			3rd	2021		
	Michael Brand	19 November 1973	CDU	Hesse	Fulda	38.1%	4th	2005		
	Jens Brandenburg	8 March 1986	FDP	Baden-Württemberg			8th	2017		
	Mario Brandenburg	3 October 1983	FDP	Rhineland-Palatinate			3rd	2017		
	Dirk Brandes	25 May 1974	AfD	Lower Saxony			6th	2021		
	Reinhard Brandl	1 August 1977	CSU	Bavaria	Ingolstadt	44.9%		2009		
	Stephan Brandner	29 May 1966	AfD	Thuringia	Gera – Greiz – Altenburger Land	29.0%	1st	2017		
	Franziska Brantner	24 August 1979	GRÜNE	Baden-Württemberg	Heidelberg	30.2%	1st	2013		
	Helge Braun	18 October 1972	CDU	Hesse			1st	2002–2005, 2009		
	Jürgen Braun	25 August 1961	AfD	Baden-Württemberg			10th	2017		
	Silvia Breher	23 July 1973	CDU	Lower Saxony	Cloppenburg – Vechta	49.1%	30th	2017		
	Sebastian Brehm	18 October 1971	CSU	Bavaria	Nuremberg North	28.5%	15th	2017		
	Heike Brehmer	5 November 1962	CDU	Saxony-Anhalt	Harz	27.7%	1st	2009		
	Michael Breilmann	10 October 1983	CDU	North Rhine-Westphalia			16th	2021		
	Leni Breymaier	26 April 1960	SPD	Baden-Württemberg			7th	2017		
	Ralph Brinkhaus	15 June 1968	CDU	North Rhine-Westphalia	Gütersloh I	40.0%	3rd	2009	Faction leader (to Feb 2022)	
	Carsten Brodesser	5 September 1967	CDU	North Rhine-Westphalia	Oberbergischer Kreis	33.9%	38th	2017		
	Marlon Bröhr	3 April 1974	CDU	Rhineland-Palatinate	Mosel/Rhein-Hunsrück	34.3%	14th	2021		
	Agnieszka Brugger	8 February 1985	GRÜNE	Baden-Württemberg			3rd	2009		
	Frank Bsirske	10 February 1952	GRÜNE	Lower Saxony			6th	2021		
	Sandra Bubendorfer-Licht	5 September 1969	FDP	Bavaria			9th	2019		
	Katrin Budde	13 April 1965	SPD	Saxony-Anhalt			2nd	2017		
	Marcus Bühl	29 April 1977	AfD	Thuringia	Gotha – Ilm-Kreis	26.5%	5th	2017		
	Clara Bünger	4 July 1986	LINKE	Saxony			5th	2022	Moved up after the resignation of Katja Kipping	
	Yannick Bury	11 March 1990	CDU	Baden-Württemberg	Emmendingen – Lahr	27.8%		2021		
	Marco Buschmann	1 August 1977	FDP	North Rhine-Westphalia			4th	2009–2013, 2017		
	Karlheinz Busen	5 April 1951	FDP	North Rhine-Westphalia			11th	2017		
	Isabel Cademartori	9 January 1988	SPD	Baden-Württemberg	Mannheim	26.4%	17th	2021		
	Lars Castellucci	24 February 1974	SPD	Baden-Württemberg			10th	2013		
	Jörg Cezanne	8 June 1958	LINKE	Hesse			4th	2017–2021, 2024	Moved up after Christine Buchholz declined her mandate.; Buchholz initially replaced Pascal Meiser after the 2024 repeat election in Berlin	
	Anna Christmann	24 September 1983	GRÜNE	Baden-Württemberg			8th	2017		
	Tino Chrupalla	14 April 1975	AfD	Saxony	Görlitz	35.8%	1st	2017	Party co-leader; Faction co-leader	
	Gitta Connemann	10 May 1964	CDU	Lower Saxony	Unterems	44.4%	3rd	2002		
	Jürgen Coße	16 August 1969	SPD	North Rhine-Westphalia			29th	2016–2017, 2021		
	Joana Cotar	9 April 1973	Ind. (former AfD)	Hesse			2nd	2017	Elected for the AfD; resigned from party on 21 Nov 2022	
	Carl-Julius Cronenberg	30 July 1962	FDP	North Rhine-Westphalia			14th	2017		
	Gottfried Curio	2 September 1960	AfD	Berlin			2nd	2017		
	Mario Czaja	21 September 1975	CDU	Berlin	Berlin-Marzahn-Hellersdorf	29.4%		2021		
	Janosch Dahmen	6 September 1981	GRÜNE	North Rhine-Westphalia			4th	2020		
	Bernhard Daldrup	1 June 1956	SPD	North Rhine-Westphalia			9th	2013		
	Astrid Damerow	30 March 1958	CDU	Schleswig-Holstein	Nordfriesland – Dithmarschen Nord	30.4%	2nd	2017		
	Sevim Dağdelen	4 September 1975	BSW	North Rhine-Westphalia			3rd	2005	Resigned from LINKE on 23 Oct 2023	
	Ekin Deligöz	21 April 1971	GRÜNE	Bavaria			3rd	1998		
	Hakan Demir	16 November 1984	SPD	Berlin	Berlin-Neukölln	26.0%		2021		
	Daniela De Ridder	27 November 1962	SPD	Lower Saxony			24th	2013–2021, 2022	Moved up after the resignation of Yasmin Fahimi	
	Sandra Detzer	21 April 1980	GRÜNE	Baden-Württemberg			5th	2021		
	Karamba Diaby	27 November 1961	SPD	Saxony-Anhalt	Halle	28.8%	1st	2013		
	Martin Diedenhofen	5 February 1995	SPD	Rhineland-Palatinate			7th	2021		
	Jan Dieren	29 July 1991	SPD	North Rhine-Westphalia	Krefeld II – Wesel II	35.2%	49th	2021		
	Thomas Dietz	12 March 1967	AfD	Saxony	Erzgebirgskreis I	31.7%	13th	2021		
	Esther Dilcher	18 September 1965	SPD	Hesse	Waldeck	38.0%	8th	2017		
	Sabine Dittmar	15 September 1964	SPD	Bavaria			14th	2013		
	Bijan Djir-Sarai	6 June 1976	FDP	North Rhine-Westphalia			6th	2009–2013, 2017		
	Alexander Dobrindt	7 June 1970	CSU	Bavaria	Weilheim	41.9%	1st	2002		
	Felix Döring	23 February 1991	SPD	Hesse	Gießen	30.4%	17th	2021		
	Anke Domscheit-Berg	17 February 1968	LINKE	Brandenburg			2nd	2017		
	Michael Donth	8 June 1967	CDU	Baden-Württemberg	Reutlingen	32.5%		2013		
	Katharina Dröge	14 September 1984	GRÜNE	North Rhine-Westphalia			5th	2013		
	Falko Droßmann	11 December 1973	SPD	Hamburg	Hamburg-Mitte	33.2%		2021		
	Deborah Düring	18 July 1994	GRÜNE	Hesse			7th	2021		
	Christian Dürr	18 April 1977	FDP	Lower Saxony			1st	2017		
	Hansjörg Durz	29 July 1971	CSU	Bavaria	Augsburg-Land	40.6%		2013		
	Harald Ebner	8 July 1964	GRÜNE	Baden-Württemberg			7th	2011		
	Axel Echeverria	19 March 1980	SPD	North Rhine-Westphalia	Ennepe-Ruhr-Kreis II	35.4%	31st	2021		
	Leon Eckert	9 April 1995	GRÜNE	Bavaria			18th	2021		
	Ralph Edelhäußer	22 March 1973	CSU	Bavaria	Roth	38.0%		2021		
	Thomas Ehrhorn	20 March 1959	AfD	Lower Saxony			3rd	2017		
	Sonja Eichwede	25 October 1987	SPD	Brandenburg	Brandenburg an der Havel – Potsdam-Mittelmark I – Havelland III – Teltow-Fläming I	32.1%	6th	2021		
	Marcel Emmerich	12 May 1991	GRÜNE	Baden-Württemberg			11th	2021		
	Alexander Engelhard	26 September 1972	CSU	Bavaria	Neu-Ulm	37.2%		2021		
	Heike Engelhardt	5 June 1961	SPD	Baden-Württemberg			21	2021		
	Martina Englhardt-Kopf	8 June 1981	CSU	Bavaria	Schwandorf	35.1%	12	2021		
	Thomas Erndl	22 July 1974	CSU	Bavaria	Deggendorf	37.4%		2017		
	Klaus Ernst	1 November 1954	BSW	Bavaria			2nd	2005	Resigned from LINKE on 23 Oct 2023	
	Wiebke Esdar	11 February 1984	SPD	North Rhine-Westphalia	Bielefeld – Gütersloh II	30.0%	16th	2017		
	Saskia Esken	28 August 1961	SPD	Baden-Württemberg			1st	2013	Party co-leader	
	Michael Espendiller	5 May 1989	AfD	North Rhine-Westphalia			6th	2017		
	Marcus Faber	4 February 1984	FDP	Saxony-Anhalt			1st	2017		
	Hermann Färber	26 March 1963	CDU	Baden-Württemberg	Göppingen	31.0%		2013		
	Ariane Fäscher	1 March 1968	SPD	Brandenburg	Oberhavel – Havelland II	26.3%	10th	2021		
	Robert Farle	16 February 1950	Ind. (former AfD)	Saxony-Anhalt	Mansfeld	25.1%		2021	Elected for the AfD; resigned from party on 3 Nov 2023	
	Johannes Fechner	25 November 1972	SPD	Baden-Württemberg			6th	2013		
	Uwe Feiler	2 November 1965	CDU	Brandenburg			2nd	2013		
	Peter Felser	20 September 1969	AfD	Bavaria			11th	2017		
	Enak Ferlemann	12 July 1963	CDU	Lower Saxony			5th	2002		
	Susanne Ferschl	10 March 1973	LINKE	Bavaria			3rd	2017		
	Emilia Fester	28 April 1998	GRÜNE	Hamburg			3rd	2021	Former Baby of the House	
	Sebastian Fiedler	19 June 1973	SPD	North Rhine-Westphalia	Mülheim – Essen I	36.3%	62nd	2021		
	Alexander Föhr	1 August 1980	CDU	Baden-Württemberg			6th	2023	Moved up after the resignation of Michael Hennrich	
	Daniel Föst	10 August 1976	FDP	Bavaria			1st	2017		
	Edgar Franke	20 January 1960	SPD	Hesse	Schwalm-Eder	39.3%	11th	2009		
	Thorsten Frei	8 August 1973	CDU	Baden-Württemberg	Schwarzwald-Baar	36.4%		2013		
	Otto Fricke	21 November 1965	FDP	North Rhine-Westphalia			7th	2002–2013, 2017		
	Dietmar Friedhoff	18 June 1966	AfD	Lower Saxony			4th	2017		
	Hans-Peter Friedrich	10 March 1957	CSU	Bavaria	Hof	41.2%		1998		
	Michael Frieser	30 March 1964	CSU	Bavaria	Nuremberg South	34.4%		2009		
	Götz Frömming	30 August 1968	AfD	Berlin			3rd	2017		
	Markus Frohnmaier	25 February 1991	AfD	Baden-Württemberg			4th	2017		
	Fabian Funke	25 July 1997	SPD	Saxony			7th	2021		
	Maximilian Funke-Kaiser	17 August 1993	FDP	Bavaria			11th	2021		
	Ingo Gädechens	30 July 1960	CDU	Schleswig-Holstein			3rd	2009		
	Schahina Gambir	6 June 1991	GRÜNE	North Rhine-Westphalia			19th	2021		
	Tessa Ganserer	16 May 1977	GRÜNE	Bavaria			13th	2021		
	Martin Gassner-Herz	16 May 1985	FDP	Baden-Württemberg			16th	2021		
	Matthias Gastel	26 December 1970	GRÜNE	Baden-Württemberg			9th	2013		
	Alexander Gauland	20 February 1941	AfD	Brandenburg			1st	2017		
	Manuel Gava	20 February 1991	SPD	Lower Saxony	Stadt Osnabrück	30.3%	21st	2021		
	Thomas Gebhart	20 December 1971	CDU	Rhineland-Palatinate			3rd	2009		
	Kai Gehring	26 December 1977	GRÜNE	North Rhine-Westphalia			16th	2005		
	Jonas Geissler	5 June 1984	CSU	Bavaria	Coburg	36.5%		2021		
	Stefan Gelbhaar	9 July 1976	GRÜNE	Berlin	Berlin-Pankow	25.5%	2nd	2017		
	Michael Gerdes	23 May 1960	SPD	North Rhine-Westphalia	Bottrop – Recklinghausen III	39.1%	41st	2009		
	Knut Gerschau	3 July 1961	FDP	Lower Saxony			5th	2021		
	Martin Gerster	30 August 1971	SPD	Baden-Württemberg			8th	2005		
	Jan-Niclas Gesenhues	12 February 1990	GRÜNE	North Rhine-Westphalia			8th	2021		
	Albrecht Glaser	8 January 1942	AfD	Hesse			5th	2017		
	Angelika Glöckner	5 February 1962	SPD	Rhineland-Palatinate	Pirmasens	30.4%	8th	2014		
	Hannes Gnauck	8 August 1991	AfD	Brandenburg			5th	2021		
	Anikó Glogowski-Merten	25 March 1982	FDP	Lower Saxony			8th	2021		
	Katrin Göring-Eckardt	3 May 1966	GRÜNE	Thuringia			1st	1998	Faction co-leader (to Dec 2021); Vice-president of the Bundestag (from Dec 2021)	
	Christian Görke	17 March 1962	LINKE	Brandenburg			1st	2021		
	Nicole Gohlke	15 November 1975	LINKE	Bavaria			1st	2009		
	Kay Gottschalk	12 December 1965	AfD	North Rhine-Westphalia			2nd	2017		
	Ingeborg Gräßle	2 March 1961	CDU	Baden-Württemberg	Backnang – Schwäbisch Gmünd	30.5%	5th	2021		
	Fabian Gramling	5 April 1987	CDU	Baden-Württemberg	Neckar-Zaber	30.4%		2021		
	Armin Grau	18 March 1959	GRÜNE	Rhineland-Palatinate			4th	2021		
	Kerstin Griese	6 December 1966	SPD	North Rhine-Westphalia			4th	2000–2009, 2010		
	Fabian Griewel	2 February 1997	FDP	North Rhine-Westphalia			21st	2024	Moved up after the resignation of Marie-Agnes Strack-Zimmermann	
	Hermann Gröhe	25 February 1961	CDU	North Rhine-Westphalia	Neuss I	35.8%	14th	1994		
	Michael Grosse-Brömer	12 October 1960	CDU	Lower Saxony			2nd	2002		
	Markus Grübel	15 October 1959	CDU	Baden-Württemberg	Esslingen	32.0%		2002		
	Nils Gründer	23 May 1997	FDP	Bavaria			15th	2022	Moved up after the resignation of Thomas Sattelberger	
	Julian Grünke	31 August 1995	FDP	Baden-Württemberg			18th	2024	Moved up after the resignation of Michael Theurer	
	Monika Grütters	9 January 1962	CDU	Berlin	Berlin-Reinickendorf	27.2%	1st	2005		
	Sabine Grützmacher	4 January 1986	GRÜNE	North Rhine-Westphalia			25th	2021		
	Manfred Grund	3 July 1955	CDU	Thuringia	Eichsfeld – Nordhausen – Kyffhäuserkreis	26.6%	4th	1994		
	Erhard Grundl	7 January 1963	GRÜNE	Bavaria			8th	2017		
	Oliver Grundmann	21 August 1971	CDU	Lower Saxony	Stade I – Rotenburg II	34.6%	18th	2013		
	Serap Güler	7 July 1980	CDU	North Rhine-Westphalia			8th	2021		
	Fritz Güntzler	6 May 1966	CDU	Lower Saxony			10th	2013		
	Ates Gürpinar	25 September 1984	LINKE	Bavaria			4th	2021		
	Olav Gutting	14 October 1970	CDU	Baden-Württemberg	Bruchsal – Schwetzingen	29.6%		2002		
	Gregor Gysi	16 January 1948	LINKE	Berlin	Berlin-Treptow-Köpenick	35.4%		1990–2002, 2005		
	Christian Haase	6 May 1966	CDU	North Rhine-Westphalia	Höxter – Gütersloh III – Lippe II	40.1%		2013		
	Robert Habeck	2 September 1969	GRÜNE	Schleswig-Holstein	Flensburg – Schleswig	28.1%	2nd	2021	Party co-leader (to Jan 2022)	
	Thomas Hacker	9 October 1967	FDP	Bavaria			13th	2017		
	Bettina Hagedorn	26 December 1955	SPD	Schleswig-Holstein	Ostholstein – Stormarn-Nord	33.7%	4th	2002		
	Rita Hagl-Kehl	11 November 1970	SPD	Bavaria			6th	2013		
	André Hahn	20 April 1963	LINKE	Saxony			4th	2013		
	Florian Hahn	14 March 1974	CSU	Bavaria	Munich Land	39.1%	7th	2009		
	Metin Hakverdi	25 June 1969	SPD	Hamburg	Hamburg-Bergedorf – Harburg	39.3%	6th	2013		
	Mariana Harder-Kühnel	16 August 1974	AfD	Hesse			1st	2017		
	Jürgen Hardt	30 May 1953	CDU	North Rhine-Westphalia			22nd	2009		
	Philipp Hartewig	5 October 1994	FDP	Saxony			3rd	2021		
	Sebastian Hartmann	7 July 1977	SPD	North Rhine-Westphalia			3rd	2013		
	Ulrike Harzer	13 June 1968	FDP	Saxony			4th	2021		
	Britta Haßelmann	10 December 1961	GRÜNE	North Rhine-Westphalia			1st	2005		
	Matthias Hauer	18 December 1977	CDU	North Rhine-Westphalia	Essen III	30.7%	11th	2013		
	Jochen Haug	11 January 1973	AfD	North Rhine-Westphalia			11th	2017		
	Stefan Heck	12 August 1982	CDU	Hesse			7th	2013–2017, 2021		
	Dirk Heidenblut	21 April 1961	SPD	North Rhine-Westphalia	Essen II	37.8%	65th	2013		
	Peter Heidt	28 April 1965	FDP	Hesse			7th	2019		
	Hubertus Heil	3 November 1972	SPD	Lower Saxony	Gifhorn – Peine	43.7%	1st	1998		
	Mechthild Heil	23 August 1961	CDU	Rhineland-Palatinate	Ahrweiler	34.3%	5th	2009		
	Frauke Heiligenstadt	24 March 1966	SPD	Lower Saxony	Goslar – Northeim – Osterode	36.7%	10th	2021		
	Thomas Heilmann	16 July 1964	CDU	Berlin	Berlin-Steglitz-Zehlendorf	28.0%	4th	2017		
	Gabriela Heinrich	18 April 1963	SPD	Bavaria			8th	2013		
	Linda Heitmann	2 August 1982	GRÜNE	Hamburg	Hamburg-Altona	29.7%	5th	2021		
	Matthias Helferich	14 October 1988	Ind. (AfD)	North Rhine-Westphalia			7th	2021	Elected for the AfD; sits as non-attached member	
	Mark Helfrich	8 September 1978	CDU	Schleswig-Holstein	Steinburg – Dithmarschen Süd	29.2%	7th	2013		
	Katrin Helling-Plahr	2 April 1986	FDP	North Rhine-Westphalia			15th	2017		
	Wolfgang Hellmich	5 May 1958	SPD	North Rhine-Westphalia			21st	2012		
	Kathrin Henneberger	1 April 1987	GRÜNE	North Rhine-Westphalia			20th	2021		
	Anke Hennig	7 October 1964	SPD	Lower Saxony			18th	2021		
	Susanne Hennig-Wellsow	13 October 1977	LINKE	Thuringia			1st	2021	Party co-leader (to Apr 2022)	
	Marc Henrichmann	1 June 1976	CDU	North Rhine-Westphalia	Coesfeld – Steinfurt II	40.9%		2017		
	Markus Herbrand	24 February 1971	FDP	North Rhine-Westphalia			12th	2017		
	Torsten Herbst	23 August 1973	FDP	Saxony			1st	2017		
	Bernhard Herrmann	13 January 1966	GRÜNE	Saxony			2nd	2021		
	Nadine Heselhaus	12 October 1978	SPD	North Rhine-Westphalia			10th	2021		
	Martin Hess	11 January 1971	AfD	Baden-Württemberg			2nd	2017		
	Katja Hessel	5 May 1972	FDP	Bavaria			2nd	2017		
	Heike Heubach	14 December 1979	SPD	Bavaria			24th	2024	Moved up after the resignation of Uli Grötsch	
	Ansgar Heveling	3 July 1972	CDU	North Rhine-Westphalia	Krefeld I – Neuss II	33.4%		2009		
	Susanne Hierl	29 September 1973	CSU	Bavaria	Amberg	40.3%	20th	2021		
	Karsten Hilse	12 December 1964	AfD	Saxony	Bautzen I	33.4%	4th	2017		
	Christian Hirte	23 May 1976	CDU	Thuringia			1st	2008		
	Thomas Hitschler	22 June 1982	SPD	Rhineland-Palatinate	Südpfalz	28.2%	1st	2013		
	Gero Clemens Hocker	30 June 1975	FDP	Lower Saxony			6th	2017		
	Nicole Höchst	10 February 1970	AfD	Rhineland-Palatinate			2nd	2017		
	Manuel Höferlin	6 February 1973	FDP	Rhineland-Palatinate			5th	2009–2013, 2017		
	Bruno Hönel	1 April 1996	GRÜNE	Schleswig-Holstein			6th	2021		
	Alexander Hoffmann	6 March 1975	CSU	Bavaria	Main-Spessart	38.6%		2013		
	Bettina Hoffmann	18 January 1960	GRÜNE	Hesse			1st	2017		
	Christoph Hoffmann	9 December 1957	FDP	Baden-Württemberg			9th	2017		
	Anton Hofreiter	2 February 1970	GRÜNE	Bavaria			2nd	2005	Faction co-leader (to Dec 2021)	
	Angela Hohmann	10 April 1963	SPD	Lower Saxony			28th	2024	Replaced Ana-Maria Trăsnea after the 2024 repeat election in Berlin	
	Leif-Erik Holm	1 August 1970	AfD	Mecklenburg-Vorpommern			1st	2017		
	Ottmar von Holtz	27 September 1961	GRÜNE	Lower Saxony			14th	2017–2021, 2024	Moved up after the resignation of Jürgen Trittin	
	Hendrik Hoppenstedt	14 June 1972	CDU	Lower Saxony			1st	2013		
	Franziska Hoppermann	8 January 1982	CDU	Hamburg			2nd	2021		
	Jasmina Hostert	3 December 1982	SPD	Baden-Württemberg			9th	2021		
	Reinhard Houben	29 April 1960	FDP	North Rhine-Westphalia			8th	2017		
	Johannes Huber	12 January 1987	Ind. (former AfD)	Bavaria			6th	2017	Elected for the AfD; sits as non-attached member since 30 Dec 2021	
	Verena Hubertz	26 November 1987	SPD	Rhineland-Palatinate	Trier	33.0%	6th	2021		
	Markus Hümpfer	17 March 1992	SPD	Bavaria			21st	2021		
	Hubert Hüppe	3 November 1956	CDU	North Rhine-Westphalia			21st	1991–2009, 2012–2017, 2021		
	Andrej Hunko	29 September 1963	BSW	North Rhine-Westphalia			4th	2009	Resigned from LINKE on 23 Oct 2023	
	Gerrit Huy	13 May 1953	AfD	Bavaria			12th	2021		
	Olaf in der Beek	31 July 1967	FDP	North Rhine-Westphalia			17th	2017		
	Erich Irlstorfer	27 May 1970	CSU	Bavaria	Freising	36.2%		2013		
	Fabian Jacobi	19 June 1973	AfD	North Rhine-Westphalia			3rd	2017		
	Dieter Janecek	25 May 1976	GRÜNE	Bavaria			4th	2013		
	Steffen Janich	22 January 1971	AfD	Saxony	Sächsische Schweiz-Osterzgebirge	33.0%%	6th	2021		
	Anne Janssen	31 August 1982	CDU	Lower Saxony			6th	2021		
	Thomas Jarzombek	28 April 1973	CDU	North Rhine-Westphalia	Düsseldorf I	31.1%	12th	2009		
	Gyde Jensen	14 August 1989	FDP	Schleswig-Holstein			2nd	2017		
	Andreas Jung	13 May 1975	CDU	Baden-Württemberg	Konstanz	34.1%	3rd	2005		
	Frank Junge	5 May 1967	SPD	Mecklenburg-Vorpommern	Ludwigslust-Parchim II – Nordwestmecklenburg II – Landkreis Rostock I	35.2%	1st	2013		
	Josip Juratovic	15 January 1959	SPD	Baden-Württemberg			18th	2005		
	Ann-Veruschka Jurisch	10 January 1972	FDP	Baden-Württemberg			14th	2021		
	Oliver Kaczmarek	8 August 1970	SPD	North Rhine-Westphalia	Unna I	40.8%	15th	2009		
	Lamya Kaddor	11 June 1978	GRÜNE	North Rhine-Westphalia			12th	2021		
	Elisabeth Kaiser	4 March 1987	SPD	Thuringia			2nd	2017		
	Kirsten Kappert-Gonther	3 November 1966	GRÜNE	Bremen			1st	2017		
	Macit Karaahmetoğlu	11 July 1968	SPD	Baden-Württemberg			14th	2021		
	Anja Karliczek	29 April 1971	CDU	North Rhine-Westphalia	Steinfurt III	34.0%	2nd	2013		
	Carlos Kasper	3 September 1994	SPD	Saxony			5th	2021		
	Anna Kassautzki	25 December 1993	SPD	Mecklenburg-Vorpommern	Vorpommern-Rügen – Vorpommern-Greifswald I	24.3%	2nd	2021		
	Gabriele Katzmarek	8 July 1960	SPD	Baden-Württemberg			11th	2013		
	Malte Kaufmann	14 December 1976	AfD	Baden-Württemberg			7th	2021		
	Michael Kaufmann	21 April 1964	AfD	Thuringia	Saalfeld-Rudolstadt – Saale-Holzland-Kreis – Saale-Orla-Kreis	29.3%	3rd	2021		
	Stefan Kaufmann	21 August 1969	CDU	Baden-Württemberg			7th	2009–2021, 2024	Moved up after the death of Wolfgang Schäuble	
	Uwe Kekeritz	9 October 1953	GRÜNE	Bavaria			20th	2009–2021, 2024	Moved up after the resignation of Manuela Rottmann	
	Michael Kellner	8 May 1977	GRÜNE	Brandenburg			2nd	2021		
	Ronja Kemmer	3 May 1989	CDU	Baden-Württemberg	Ulm	32.7%	15th	2014		
	Franziska Kersten	19 December 1968	SPD	Saxony-Anhalt	Börde – Jerichower Land	26.2%	4th	2021		
	Katja Keul	30 November 1969	GRÜNE	Lower Saxony			7th	2009		
	Stefan Keuter	19 August 1972	AfD	North Rhine-Westphalia			12th	2017		
	Misbah Khan	4 December 1989	GRÜNE	Rhineland-Palatinate			5th	2021		
	Roderich Kiesewetter	11 September 1963	CDU	Baden-Württemberg	Aalen – Heidenheim	37.0%		2009		
	Michael Kießling	29 May 1973	CSU	Bavaria	Starnberg – Landsberg am Lech	38.2%		2017		
	Sven-Christian Kindler	14 February 1985	GRÜNE	Lower Saxony			2nd	2009		
	Georg Kippels	21 September 1959	CDU	North Rhine-Westphalia	Rhein-Erft-Kreis I	33.0%	29th	2013		
	Helmut Kleebank	18 November 1964	SPD	Berlin	Berlin-Spandau – Charlottenburg North	32.8%		2021		
	Karsten Klein	2 December 1977	FDP	Bavaria			3rd	2017		
	Ottilie Klein	14 February 1984	CDU	Berlin			3rd	2021		
	Volkmar Klein	13 January 1960	CDU	North Rhine-Westphalia	Siegen-Wittgenstein	33.6%	24th	2009		
	Maria Klein-Schmeink	6 January 1958	GRÜNE	North Rhine-Westphalia	Münster	32.3%	7th	2009		
	Norbert Kleinwächter	22 February 1986	AfD	Brandenburg			4th	2017		
	Kristian Klinck	19 April 1979	SPD	Schleswig-Holstein	Plön – Neumünster	31.4%	13th	2021		
	Lars Klingbeil	23 February 1978	SPD	Lower Saxony	Rotenburg I – Heidekreis	47.6%	5th	2005, 2009	Party co-leader (from Dec 2021)	
	Julia Klöckner	16 December 1972	CDU	Rhineland-Palatinate			1st	2002–2011, 2021		
	Annika Klose	24 June 1992	SPD	Berlin			4th	2021		
	Daniela Kluckert	22 December 1980	FDP	Berlin			2nd	2017		
	Tim Klüssendorf	16 August 1991	SPD	Schleswig-Holstein	Lübeck	34.1%	5th	2021		
	Axel Knoerig	1 March 1967	CDU	Lower Saxony	Diepholz – Nienburg I	33.8%	24th	2009		
	Pascal Kober	3 July 1971	FDP	Baden-Württemberg			4th	2009–2013, 2017		
	Lukas Köhler	20 August 1986	FDP	Bavaria			4th	2017		
	Anne König	4 December 1984	CDU	North Rhine-Westphalia	Borken II	43.7%		2021		
	Jörn König	29 October 1967	AfD	Lower Saxony			5th	2017		
	Jens Koeppen	27 September 1962	CDU	Brandenburg			1st	2005		
	Carsten Körber	11 June 1979	CDU	Saxony			5th	2013		
	Bärbel Kofler	24 May 1967	SPD	Bavaria			2nd	2004		
	Enrico Komning	6 August 1968	AfD	Mecklenburg-Vorpommern			2nd	2017		
	Carina Konrad	19 September 1982	FDP	Rhineland-Palatinate			2nd	2017		
	Markus Koob	5 December 1977	CDU	Hesse	Hochtaunus	31.3%	10th	2013		
	Chantal Kopf	20 March 1995	GRÜNE	Baden-Württemberg	Freiburg	28.8%	14th	2021		
	Jan Korte	5 April 1977	LINKE	Saxony-Anhalt			1st	2005		
	Simona Koß	9 June 1961	SPD	Brandenburg	Märkisch-Oderland – Barnim II	24.8%	8th	2021		
	Steffen Kotré	29 April 1971	AfD	Brandenburg			3rd	2017		
	Philip Krämer	29 February 1992	GRÜNE	Hesse			6th	2021		
	Laura Kraft	1 December 1990	GRÜNE	North Rhine-Westphalia			23rd	2021		
	Rainer Kraft	8 January 1974	AfD	Bavaria			8th	2017		
	Anette Kramme	10 October 1967	SPD	Bavaria			4th	1998		
	Dunja Kreiser	27 June 1971	SPD	Lower Saxony	Salzgitter – Wolfenbüttel	38.6%	12th	2021		
	Johannes Kretschmann	14 July 1978	GRÜNE	Baden-Württemberg			22nd	2025	Moved up after the death of Stephanie Aeffner	
	Jürgen Kretz	7 June 1982	GRÜNE	Baden-Württemberg			19th	2024	Moved up after the resignation of Christian Kühn	
	Gunther Krichbaum	4 May 1964	CDU	Baden-Württemberg	Pforzheim	28.5%		2002		
	Günter Krings	7 August 1969	CDU	North Rhine-Westphalia	Mönchengladbach	35.6%	7th	2002		
	Martin Kröber	12 February 1992	SPD	Saxony-Anhalt	Magdeburg	25.3%	3rd	2021		
	Franziska Krumwiede-Steiner	23 July 1985	GRÜNE	North Rhine-Westphalia			29th	2024	Replaced Nina Stahr after the 2024 repeat election in Berlin	
	Michael Kruse	30 December 1983	FDP	Hamburg			1st	2021		
	Tilman Kuban	26 May 1987	CDU	Lower Saxony			7th	2021		
	Wolfgang Kubicki	3 March 1952	FDP	Schleswig-Holstein			1st	1990–1992, 2002, 2017	Vice-president of the Bundestag	
	Kevin Kühnert	1 July 1989	SPD	Berlin	Berlin-Tempelhof-Schöneberg	27.1%	3rd	2021		
	Renate Künast	15 December 1955	GRÜNE	Berlin			3rd	2002		
	Konstantin Kuhle	11 February 1989	FDP	Lower Saxony			4th	2017		
	Markus Kurth	14 April 1966	GRÜNE	North Rhine-Westphalia			22nd	2002		
	Sarah Lahrkamp	4 July 1981	SPD	North Rhine-Westphalia			24th	2021		
	Ricarda Lang	17 January 1994	GRÜNE	Baden-Württemberg			10th	2021		
	Ulrich Lange	6 June 1969	CSU	Bavaria	Donau-Ries	41.1%		2009		
	Andreas Larem	25 September 1964	SPD	Hesse	Darmstadt	27.4%	15th	2021		
	Armin Laschet	18 February 1961	CDU	North Rhine-Westphalia			1st	1994–1998, 2021	Party leader (to Jan 2022)	
	Ina Latendorf	26 June 1971	LINKE	Mecklenburg-Vorpommern			2nd	2021		
	Silke Launert	27 December 1976	CSU	Bavaria	Bayreuth	42.4%	16th	2013		
	Karl Lauterbach	21 February 1963	SPD	North Rhine-Westphalia	Leverkusen – Cologne IV	45.6%	23rd	2005		
	Caren Lay	11 December 1972	LINKE	Saxony			3rd	2009		
	Ulrich Lechte	26 August 1977	FDP	Bavaria			8th	2017		
	Jens Lehmann	19 December 1967	CDU	Saxony	Leipzig I	20.5%	7th	2017		
	Sven Lehmann	4 December 1979	GRÜNE	North Rhine-Westphalia	Cologne II	34.6%	4th	2017		
	Sylvia Lehmann	23 April 1954	SPD	Brandenburg	Dahme-Spreewald – Teltow-Fläming III – Oberspreewald-Lausitz I	26.5%	4th	2019		
	Paul Lehrieder	20 November 1959	CSU	Bavaria	Würzburg	36.9%	33rd	2005		
	Katja Leikert	3 March 1975	CDU	Hesse			5th	2013		
	Kevin Leiser	3 September 1993	SPD	Baden-Württemberg			20th	2021		
	Steffi Lemke	19 January 1968	GRÜNE	Saxony-Anhalt			1st	1994–2002, 2013		
	Jürgen Lenders	20 April 1966	FDP	Hesse			5th	2021		
	Barbara Lenk	4 October 1982	AfD	Saxony	Meißen	31.0%	7th	2021		
	Ralph Lenkert	9 May 1967	LINKE	Thuringia			2nd	2009		
	Andreas Lenz	23 April 1981	CSU	Bavaria	Erding – Ebersberg	42.3%		2013		
	Christian Leye	6 April 1981	BSW	North Rhine-Westphalia			6th	2021	Resigned from LINKE on 23 Oct 2023	
	Luiza Licina-Bode	10 October 1972	SPD	North Rhine-Westphalia			32nd	2021		
	Thorsten Lieb	3 January 1973	FDP	Hesse			2nd	2021		
	Anja Liebert	19 September 1969	GRÜNE	North Rhine-Westphalia			27th	2021		
	Esra Limbacher	1 May 1989	SPD	Saarland	Homburg	36.6%	5th	2021		
	Helge Limburg	25 October 1982	GRÜNE	Lower Saxony			8th	2021		
	Helge Lindh	6 December 1976	SPD	North Rhine-Westphalia	Wuppertal I	37.3%	27th	2017		
	Andrea Lindholz	25 September 1970	CSU	Bavaria	Aschaffenburg	40.7%	6th	2013		
	Christian Lindner	7 January 1979	FDP	North Rhine-Westphalia			1st	2009–2012, 2017	Party leader; Faction leader (to Dec 2021)	
	Tobias Lindner	11 January 1982	GRÜNE	Rhineland-Palatinate			2nd	2011		
	Michael Georg Link	6 February 1963	FDP	Baden-Württemberg			3rd	2005–2013, 2017		
	Carsten Linnemann	10 August 1977	CDU	North Rhine-Westphalia	Paderborn	47.9%		2009		
	Patricia Lips	21 December 1963	CDU	Hesse			2nd	2002		
	Gesine Lötzsch	7 August 1961	LINKE	Berlin	Berlin-Lichtenberg	25.8%	3rd	2002		
	Denise Loop	19 May 1994	GRÜNE	Schleswig-Holstein			5th	2021		
	Bernhard Loos	30 July 1955	CSU	Bavaria	Munich North	25.7%	21st	2017		
	Rüdiger Lucassen	19 August 1951	AfD	North Rhine-Westphalia			1st	2017		
	Max Lucks	19 April 1997	GRÜNE	North Rhine-Westphalia			14th	2021		
	Jan-Marco Luczak	2 October 1975	CDU	Berlin			2nd	2009		
	Daniela Ludwig	7 July 1975	CSU	Bavaria	Rosenheim	36.1%	4th	2002		
	Anna Lührmann	14 June 1983	GRÜNE	Hesse			5th	2002–2009, 2021		
	Kristine Lütke	29 June 1982	FDP	Bavaria			12th	2021		
	Bettina Lugk	3 February 1982	SPD	North Rhine-Westphalia			14th	2021		
	Oliver Luksic	9 October 1979	FDP	Saarland			1st	2009–2013, 2017		
	Thomas Lutze	23 August 1969	SPD	Saarland			1st	2009	Elected for LINKE; defected on 10 Oct 2023	
	Tanja Machalet	1 May 1974	SPD	Rhineland-Palatinate	Montabaur	31.5%	2nd	2021		
	Klaus Mack	28 April 1973	CDU	Baden-Württemberg	Calw	33.8%		2021		
	Isabel Mackensen-Geis	29 September 1986	SPD	Rhineland-Palatinate			4th	2019		
	Yvonne Magwas	28 November 1979	CDU	Saxony	Vogtlandkreis	27.7%	4th	2013	Vice-president of the Bundestag	
	Erik von Malottki	1 April 1986	SPD	Mecklenburg-Vorpommern	Mecklenburgische Seenplatte I – Vorpommern-Greifswald II	24.8%	3rd	2021		
	Holger Mann	19 February 1979	SPD	Saxony			1st	2021		
	Astrid Mannes	2 January 1967	CDU	Hesse			8th	2017–2021, 2024	Moved up after the resignation of Ingmar Jung	
	Till Mansmann	8 January 1968	FDP	Hesse			3rd	2017		
	Zanda Martens	1 October 1984	SPD	North Rhine-Westphalia			28th	2021		
	Dorothee Martin	21 January 1978	SPD	Hamburg	Hamburg-Nord	30.7%	3rd	2020		
	Parsa Marvi	6 February 1982	SPD	Baden-Württemberg			12th	2021		
	Franziska Mascheck	4 February 1979	SPD	Saxony			8th	2021		
	Katja Mast	4 February 1971	SPD	Baden-Württemberg			5th	2005		
	Andreas Mattfeldt	28 September 1969	CDU	Lower Saxony	Osterholz – Verden	33.7%	21st	2009		
	Stephan Mayer	15 December 1973	CSU	Bavaria	Altötting	43.3%		2002		
	Zoe Mayer	7 August 1995	GRÜNE	Baden-Württemberg	Karlsruhe-Stadt	30.0%	12th	2021		
	Volker Mayer-Lay	22 June 1981	CDU	Baden-Württemberg	Bodensee	30.4%		2021		
	Andreas Mehltretter	10 December 1991	SPD	Bavaria			15th	2021		
	Pascal Meiser	7 March 1975	LINKE	Berlin			2nd	2017		
	Michael Meister	9 June 1961	CDU	Hesse	Bergstraße	30.5%	3rd	1994		
	Dirk-Ulrich Mende	26 December 1957	SPD	Lower Saxony			27th	2023	Moved up after the resignation of Andreas Philippi	
	Susanne Menge	11 February 1960	GRÜNE	Lower Saxony			13th	2021		
	Friedrich Merz	11 November 1955	CDU	North Rhine-Westphalia	Hochsauerlandkreis	40.4%		1994–2009, 2021	Party leader (from Jan 2022); Faction leader (from Feb 2022)	
	Robin Mesarosch	1 April 1991	SPD	Baden-Württemberg			16th	2021		
	Jan Metzler	5 July 1981	CDU	Rhineland-Palatinate	Worms	32.2%	6th	2013		
	Christoph Meyer	30 August 1975	FDP	Berlin			1st	2017		
	Swantje Michaelsen	4 October 1979	GRÜNE	Lower Saxony			11th	2021		
	Kathrin Michel	17 April 1963	SPD	Saxony			2nd	2021		
	Mathias Middelberg	14 December 1964	CDU	Lower Saxony			4th	2009		
	Matthias Miersch	19 December 1968	SPD	Lower Saxony	Hannover-Land II	40.7%	3rd	2005		
	Matthias Mieves	30 December 1985	SPD	Rhineland-Palatinate	Kaiserslautern	33.9%	9th	2021		
	Irene Mihalic	17 November 1976	GRÜNE	North Rhine-Westphalia			3rd	2013		
	Boris Mijatović	4 February 1974	GRÜNE	Hesse			8th	2021		
	Susanne Mittag	25 July 1958	SPD	Lower Saxony	Delmenhorst – Wesermarsch – Oldenburg-Land	36.7%	2nd	2013		
	Cornelia Möhring	9 January 1960	LINKE	Schleswig-Holstein			1st	2009		
	Siemtje Möller	20 July 1983	SPD	Lower Saxony	Friesland – Wilhelmshaven – Wittmund	45.4%	6th	2017		
	Maximilian Mörseburg	22 March 1992	CDU	Baden-Württemberg	Stuttgart II	25.9%		2021		
	Amira Mohamed Ali	16 January 1980	BSW	Lower Saxony			1st	2017	Faction co-leader (to Oct 2023); Resigned from LINKE on 23 Oct 2023	
	Claudia Moll	15 December 1968	SPD	North Rhine-Westphalia	Aachen II	34.5%	8th	2017		
	Mike Moncsek	8 August 1964	AfD	Saxony	Chemnitzer Umland – Erzgebirgskreis II	28.9%	14th	2021		
	Dietrich Monstadt	15 September 1957	CDU	Mecklenburg-Vorpommern			2nd	2009		
	Matthias Moosdorf	20 April 1965	AfD	Saxony	Zwickau	25.6%		2021		
	Maximilian Mordhorst	10 April 1996	FDP	Schleswig-Holstein			4th	2021		
	Alexander Müller	17 July 1969	FDP	Hesse			4th	2017		
	Axel Müller	24 July 1963	CDU	Baden-Württemberg	Ravensburg	30.6%		2017		
	Bettina Müller	7 June 1959	SPD	Hesse	Main-Kinzig – Wetterau II – Schotten	30.5%	4th	2013		
	Carsten Müller	8 May 1970	CDU	Lower Saxony			8th	2017		
	Claudia Müller	10 August 1981	GRÜNE	Mecklenburg-Vorpommern			1st	2017		
	Detlef Müller	20 August 1964	SPD	Saxony	Chemnitz	25.1%	3rd	2005–2009, 2014		
	Florian Müller	14 September 1987	CDU	North Rhine-Westphalia	Olpe – Märkischer Kreis I	37.1%		2021		
	Michael Müller	9 December 1964	SPD	Berlin	Berlin-Charlottenburg-Wilmersdorf	27.9%	1st	2021		
	Sascha Müller	24 April 1970	GRÜNE	Bavaria			6th	2021		
	Sepp Müller	22 January 1989	CDU	Saxony-Anhalt	Dessau – Wittenberg	34.3%	5th	2017		
	Beate Müller-Gemmeke	7 October 1960	GRÜNE	Baden-Württemberg			6th	2009		
	Frank Müller-Rosentritt	13 June 1982	FDP	Saxony			2nd	2017		
	Michelle Müntefering	9 April 1980	SPD	North Rhine-Westphalia	Herne – Bochum II	43.4%	36th	2013		
	Volker Münz	8 August 1964	AfD	Baden-Württemberg			11th	2017–2021, 2024	Moved up after the resignation of Marc Jongen	
	Sebastian Münzenmaier	2 July 1989	AfD	Rhineland-Palatinate			1st	2017		
	Rolf Mützenich	25 June 1959	SPD	North Rhine-Westphalia	Cologne III	29.9%	1st	2002	Faction leader	
	Stefan Nacke	27 January 1976	CDU	North Rhine-Westphalia			18th	2021		
	Sara Nanni	1987	GRÜNE	North Rhine-Westphalia			17th	2021		
	Rasha Nasr	12 May 1992	SPD	Saxony			4th	2021		
	Żaklin Nastić	29 January 1980	BSW	Hamburg			4th	2017	Resigned from LINKE on 23 Oct 2023	
	Edgar Naujok	25 June 1960	AfD	Saxony	Leipzig-Land	24.6%	16th	2021		
	Ingrid Nestle	22 December 1977	GRÜNE	Schleswig-Holstein			3rd	2009–2012, 2017		
	Ophelia Nick	24 January 1973	GRÜNE	North Rhine-Westphalia			13th	2021		
	Brian Nickholz	22 December 1989	SPD	North Rhine-Westphalia	Recklinghausen II	37.4%	50th	2021		
	Petra Nicolaisen	12 December 1965	CDU	Schleswig-Holstein			4th	2017		
	Dietmar Nietan	25 May 1964	SPD	North Rhine-Westphalia			17th	2005		
	Jan Nolte	30 December 1988	AfD	Hesse			4th	2017		
	Konstantin von Notz	21 January 1981	GRÜNE	Schleswig-Holstein			4th	2009		
	Omid Nouripour	18 June 1975	GRÜNE	Hesse	Frankfurt am Main II	29.0%	2nd	2006		
	Jörg Nürnberger	17 April 1967	SPD	Bavaria			19th	2021		
	Lennard Oehl	1 June 1993	SPD	Hesse	Hanau	31.1%	21st	2021		
	Wilfried Oellers	16 September 1975	CDU	North Rhine-Westphalia	Heinsberg	39.7%	47th	2013		
	Cem Özdemir	21 December 1965	GRÜNE	Baden-Württemberg	Stuttgart I	39.9%	2nd	1994–2002, 2013		
	Mahmut Özdemir	23 June 1987	SPD	North Rhine-Westphalia	Duisburg II	39.4%	64th	2013		
	Aydan Özoğuz	31 May 1967	SPD	Hamburg	Hamburg-Wandsbek	38.7%	1st	2009	Vice-president of the Bundestag	
	Moritz Oppelt	4 February 1989	CDU	Baden-Württemberg	Rhein-Neckar	28.5%		2021		
	Josephine Ortleb	25 November 1986	SPD	Saarland	Saarbrücken	36.9%	2nd	2017		
	Florian Oßner	5 July 1980	CSU	Bavaria	Landshut	36.4%		2013		
	Josef Oster	4 January 1971	CDU	Rhineland-Palatinate	Koblenz	31.7%	12th	2017		
	Henning Otte	27 October 1968	CDU	Lower Saxony	Celle – Uelzen	32.9%	13th	2005		
	Karoline Otte	11 September 1996	GRÜNE	Lower Saxony			9th	2021		
	Gerold Otten	7 December 1955	AfD	Bavaria			9th	2017		
	Julian Pahlke	15 October 1991	GRÜNE	Lower Saxony			12th	2021		
	Ingrid Pahlmann	1 December 1957	CDU	Lower Saxony			46th	2013–2017, 2019–2021, 2024	Moved up after the resignation of André Berghegger	
	Christos Pantazis	9 October 1975	SPD	Lower Saxony	Braunschweig	36.7%	26th	2013		
	Wiebke Papenbrock	24 November 1979	SPD	Brandenburg	Prignitz – Ostprignitz-Ruppin – Havelland I	33.0%	12th	2021		
	Mathias Papendieck	18 February 1982	SPD	Brandenburg	Frankfurt (Oder) – Oder-Spree	28.0%	5th	2021		
	Petra Pau	9 August 1963	LINKE	Berlin			1st	1998	Vice-president of the Bunedstag	
	Lisa Paus	19 September 1968	GRÜNE	Berlin			1st	2009		
	Natalie Pawlik	26 August 1992	SPD	Hesse	Wetterau I	29.7%	6th	2021		
	Jens Peick	16 August 1981	SPD	North Rhine-Westphalia	Dortmund I	33.0%	57th	2021		
	Sören Pellmann	11 February 1977	LINKE	Saxony	Leipzig II	22.8%	2nd	2017	Group co-leader	
	Victor Perli	1 February 1982	LINKE	Lower Saxony			2nd	2017		
	Tobias Peterka	4 September 1982	AfD	Bavaria			10th	2021		
	Christian Petry	15 March 1965	SPD	Saarland	St. Wendel	35.1%	3rd	2014		
	Paula Piechotta	19 September 1986	GRÜNE	Saxony			1st	2017		
	Stephan Pilsinger	17 February 1987	CSU	Bavaria	Munich West/Centre	27.0%	17th	2017		
	Jan Plobner	26 March 1992	SPD	Bavaria			23rd	2021		
	Christoph Ploß	19 July 1985	CDU	Hamburg			1st	2017		
	Martin Plum	26 February 1982	CDU	North Rhine-Westphalia	Viersen	35.8%	48th	2021		
	Jürgen Pohl	7 January 1964	AfD	Thuringia			2nd	2017		
	Filiz Polat	11 July 1978	GRÜNE	Lower Saxony			1st	2017		
	Sabine Poschmann	4 October 1968	SPD	North Rhine-Westphalia	Dortmund II	39.1%	6th	2013		
	Achim Post	2 May 1959	SPD	North Rhine-Westphalia	Minden-Lübbecke I	38.4%	13th	2017		
	Stephan Protschka	8 November 1977	AfD	Bavaria			3rd	2017		
	Martin Rabanus	22 September 1971	SPD	Hesse			9th	2013–2021, 2024	Moved up after the resignation of Kaweh Mansoori	
	Thomas Rachel	17 May 1962	CDU	North Rhine-Westphalia	Düren	36.7%	9th	1994		
	Kerstin Radomski	1 November 1974	CDU	North Rhine-Westphalia			20th	2013		
	Alexander Radwan	30 August 1964	CSU	Bavaria	Bad Tölz-Wolfratshausen – Miesbach	41.3%		2013		
	Claudia Raffelhüschen	7 November 1968	FDP	Baden-Württemberg			17th	2021	Moved up after Christian Jung declined his mandate	
	Alois Rainer	7 January 1965	CSU	Bavaria	Straubing	44.3%		2013		
	Peter Ramsauer	10 February 1954	CSU	Bavaria	Traunstein	36.6%		1990	Father of the House	
	Volker Redder	7 June 1959	FDP	Bremen			1st	2021		
	Henning Rehbaum	10 September 1973	CDU	North Rhine-Westphalia	Warendorf	36.3%		2021		
	Martin Reichardt	30 July 1969	AfD	Saxony-Anhalt			1st	2017		
	Markus Reichel	15 July 1968	CDU	Saxony	Dresden I	21.1%	3rd	2021		
	Heidi Reichinnek	19 April 1988	LINKE	Lower Saxony			3rd	2021	Group co-leader	
	Anja Reinalter	1 May 1970	GRÜNE	Baden-Württemberg			18th	2021		
	Martin Renner	5 May 1954	AfD	North Rhine-Westphalia			4th	2017		
	Martina Renner	11 March 1967	LINKE	Thuringia			3rd	2013		
	Bernd Reuther	1 May 1971	FDP	North Rhine-Westphalia			13th	2017		
	Ye-One Rhie	29 August 1987	SPD	North Rhine-Westphalia			30th	2021		
	Josef Rief	13 April 1960	CDU	Baden-Württemberg	Biberach	35.1%		2009		
	Bernd Riexinger	30 October 1955	LINKE	Baden-Württemberg			1st	2017		
	Andreas Rimkus	24 December 1962	SPD	North Rhine-Westphalia	Düsseldorf II	29.2%	19th	2013		
	Frank Rinck	4 November 1986	AfD	Lower Saxony			2nd	2021		
	Daniel Rinkert	11 December 1987	SPD	North Rhine-Westphalia			33rd	2022	Moved up after the death of Rainer Keller	
	Sönke Rix	3 December 1975	SPD	Schleswig-Holstein	Rendsburg-Eckernförde	30.8%	1st	2005		
	Tabea Rößner	7 December 1966	GRÜNE	Rhineland-Palatinate			1st	2009		
	Norbert Röttgen	2 July 1965	CDU	North Rhine-Westphalia	Rhein-Sieg-Kreis II	40.0%		1994		
	Thomas Röwekamp	18 September 1966	CDU	Bremen			1st	2021		
	Dennis Rohde	24 June 1986	SPD	Lower Saxony	Oldenburg – Ammerland	38.2%	7th	2013		
	Lars Rohwer	1 February 1972	CDU	Saxony	Dresden II – Bautzen II	18.6%		2021		
	Sebastian Roloff	28 January 1983	SPD	Bavaria			5th	2021		
	Martin Rosemann	20 October 1976	SPD	Baden-Württemberg			4th	2013		
	Jessica Rosenthal	28 October 1992	SPD	North Rhine-Westphalia			20th	2021		
	Claudia Roth	15 May 1955	GRÜNE	Bavaria			1st	1998–2001, 2002	Vice-president of the Bundestag (to Dec 2021)	
	Michael Roth	24 August 1970	SPD	Hesse	Werra-Meißner – Hersfeld-Rotenburg	43.7%	1st	1998		
	Rainer Rothfuß	19 April 1971	AfD	Bavaria			13th	2023	Moved up after the death of Corinna Miazga	
	Stefan Rouenhoff	23 December 1978	CDU	North Rhine-Westphalia	Kleve	37.6%	36th	2017		
	Thorsten Rudolph	15 March 1974	SPD	Rhineland-Palatinate			3rd	2021		
	Tina Rudolph	21 May 1991	SPD	Thuringia			4th	2021		
	Erwin Rüddel	21 December 1955	CDU	Rhineland-Palatinate	Neuwied	31.9%	7th	2009		
	Corinna Rüffer	11 October 1975	GRÜNE	Rhineland-Palatinate			3rd	2013		
	Bernd Rützel	2 October 1968	SPD	Bavaria			7th	2013		
	Nadine Ruf	2 February 1978	SPD	Hesse			10th	2024	Moved up after the resignation of Timon Gremmels	
	Albert Rupprecht	10 June 1968	CSU	Bavaria	Weiden	38.5%		2002		
	Sarah Ryglewski	31 January 1983	SPD	Bremen	Bremen I	30.2%	1st	2015		
	Johann Saathoff	9 December 1967	SPD	Lower Saxony	Aurich – Emden	52.8%	11th	2013		
	Michael Sacher	1 September 1964	GRÜNE	North Rhine-Westphalia			28th	2022	Moved up after the resignation of Oliver Krischer	
	Kassem Taher Saleh	1 June 1993	GRÜNE	Saxony			4th	2021		
	Catarina dos Santos Firnhaber	8 July 1994	CDU	North Rhine-Westphalia			15th	2021		
	Christian Sauter	11 February 1980	FDP	North Rhine-Westphalia			16th	2017		
	Axel Schäfer	3 August 1952	SPD	North Rhine-Westphalia	Bochum I	38.3%	54th	2002		
	Ingo Schäfer	20 September 1965	SPD	North Rhine-Westphalia	Solingen – Remscheid – Wuppertal II	32.6%	43rd	2021		
	Jamila Schäfer	30 April 1993	GRÜNE	Bavaria	Munich South	27.5%	7th	2021		
	Sebastian Schäfer	11 July 1979	GRÜNE	Baden-Württemberg			17th	2021		
	Frank Schäffler	22 December 1968	FDP	North Rhine-Westphalia			9th	2005–2013, 2017		
	Johannes Schätzl	10 June 1993	SPD	Bavaria			17th	2021		
	Rebecca Schamber	7 December 1975	SPD	Lower Saxony	Hannover-Land I	33.7%	22nd	2021		
	Lucia Schanbacher	12 November 1989	SPD	Baden-Württemberg			15th	2025	Moved up after the resignation of Takis Mehmet Ali	
	Bernd Schattner	27 June 1968	AfD	Rhineland-Palatinate			4th	2021		
	Ulle Schauws	30 April 1966	GRÜNE	North Rhine-Westphalia			9th	2013		
	Nina Scheer	11 September 1971	SPD	Schleswig-Holstein	Herzogtum Lauenburg – Stormarn-Süd	31.0%	2nd	2013		
	Christiane Schenderlein	17 October 1981	CDU	Saxony			2nd	2021		
	Marianne Schieder	23 May 1962	SPD	Bavaria			12th	2005		
	Udo Schiefner	7 August 1959	SPD	North Rhine-Westphalia			7th	2013		
	Ulrike Schielke-Ziesing	17 June 1969	AfD	Mecklenburg-Vorpommern			3rd	2017		
	Peggy Schierenbeck	9 October 1970	SPD	Lower Saxony			20th	2021		
	Manfred Schiller	23 September 1961	AfD	Bavaria			15th	2024	Moved up after the resignation of Petr Bystron	
	Jana Schimke	6 September 1979	CDU	Brandenburg			3rd	2013		
	Timo Schisanowski	27 August 1981	SPD	North Rhine-Westphalia	Hagen – Ennepe-Ruhr-Kreis I	33.3%	51st	2021		
	Christoph Schmid	8 July 1976	SPD	Bavaria			9th	2021		
	Nils Schmid	11 July 1973	SPD	Baden-Württemberg			2nd	2017		
	Dagmar Schmidt	13 March 1973	SPD	Hesse	Lahn-Dill	33.1%	2nd	2013		
	Eugen Schmidt	23 October 1975	AfD	North Rhine-Westphalia			10th	2021		
	Jan Wenzel Schmidt	8 October 1991	AfD	Saxony-Anhalt			2nd	2021		
	Stefan Schmidt	19 May 1981	GRÜNE	Bavaria			10th	2017		
	Uwe Schmidt	14 February 1966	SPD	Bremen	Bremen II – Bremerhaven	36.9%	2nd	2017		
	Carsten Schneider	23 January 1976	SPD	Thuringia	Erfurt – Weimar – Weimarer Land II	24.4%	1st	1998		
	Daniel Schneider	11 December 1976	SPD	Lower Saxony	Cuxhaven – Stade II	36.8%	23rd	2021		
	Jörg Schneider	14 May 1964	AfD	North Rhine-Westphalia			5th	2017		
	Patrick Schnieder	1 May 1968	CDU	Rhineland-Palatinate	Bitburg	37.8%	2nd	2009		
	Nadine Schön	5 June 1983	CDU	Saarland			3rd	2009	Moved up after Annegret Kramp-Karrenbauer declined her mandate	
	Marlene Schönberger	6 December 1990	GRÜNE	Bavaria			15th	2021		
	Olaf Scholz	14 June 1958	SPD	Brandenburg	Potsdam – Potsdam-Mittelmark II – Teltow-Fläming II	34.0%	1st	1998–2001, 2002–2011, 2021		
	Johannes Schraps	17 August 1983	SPD	Lower Saxony	Hameln-Pyrmont – Holzminden	43.2%	9th	2017		
	Christian Schreider	22 December 1971	SPD	Rhineland-Palatinate	Ludwigshafen/Frankenthal	32.8%	13th	2021		
	Felix Schreiner	29 January 1986	CDU	Baden-Württemberg	Waldshut	33.6%		2017		
	Michael Schrodi	3 July 1977	SPD	Bavaria			13th	2017		
	Christina-Johanne Schröder	6 December 1983	GRÜNE	Lower Saxony			3rd	2021		
	Ria Schröder	7 March 1992	FDP	Hamburg			2nd	2021		
	Anja Schulz	28 October 1985	FDP	Lower Saxony			3rd	2021		
	Uwe Schulz	12 December 1961	AfD	Hesse			3rd	2017		
	Kordula Schulz-Asche	31 December 1956	GRÜNE	Hesse			3rd	2013		
	Svenja Schulze	29 September 1968	SPD	North Rhine-Westphalia			2nd	2021		
	Frank Schwabe	12 November 1970	SPD	North Rhine-Westphalia	Recklinghausen I	41.0%	25th	2005		
	Stefan Schwartze	23 May 1974	SPD	North Rhine-Westphalia	Herford – Minden-Lübbecke II	36.5%	11th	2009		
	Andreas Schwarz	3 March 1965	SPD	Bavaria			11th	2013		
	Rita Schwarzelühr-Sutter	13 October 1962	SPD	Baden-Württemberg			3rd	2005		
	Matthias Seestern-Pauly	28 February 1984	FDP	Lower Saxony			7th	2017		
	Stefan Seidler	18 December 1979	SSW	Schleswig-Holstein			1st	2021		
	Detlef Seif	15 August 1962	CDU	North Rhine-Westphalia	Euskirchen – Rhein-Erft-Kreis II	34.6%	43rd	2009		
	Stephan Seiter	18 March 1963	FDP	Baden-Württemberg			11th	2021		
	Thomas Seitz	8 October 1967	Ind. (former AfD)	Baden-Württemberg			9th	2017	Elected for the AfD; resigned from the party on 31 Mar 2024	
	Lina Seitzl	3 June 1989	SPD	Baden-Württemberg			15th	2021		
	Melis Sekmen	26 September 1993	CDU	Baden-Württemberg			16th	2021	Elected for GRÜNE; left faction on 1 Jul 2024; defected on 9 Jul	
	Rainer Semet	4 September 1957	FDP	Baden-Württemberg			15th	2021		
	Martin Sichert	10 June 1980	AfD	Bavaria			5th	2017		
	Thomas Silberhorn	12 November 1968	CSU	Bavaria	Bamberg	37.0%		2002		
	Björn Simon	18 May 1981	CDU	Hesse	Offenbach	27.8%	17th	2017		
	Petra Sitte	1 December 1960	LINKE	Saxony-Anhalt			2nd	2005		
	Judith Skudelny	2 October 1975	FDP	Baden-Württemberg			2nd	2017		
	Nyke Slawik	7 January 1994	GRÜNE	North Rhine-Westphalia			11th	2021		
	Tino Sorge	4 March 1975	CDU	Saxony-Anhalt			3rd	2013		
	Jens Spahn	16 May 1980	CDU	North Rhine-Westphalia	Steinfurt I – Borken I	40.0%	4th	2002		
	Anne-Monika Spallek	16 January 1968	GRÜNE	North Rhine-Westphalia			21st	2021		
	Dirk Spaniel	3 November 1971	WU	Baden-Württemberg			3rd	2017	Elected for the AfD; resigned from party on 15 Oct 2024; joined WU in Jan 2025	
	Merle Spellerberg	13 November 1996	GRÜNE	Saxony			3rd	2021		
	René Springer	15 July 1979	AfD	Brandenburg			2nd	2017		
	Svenja Stadler	26 August 1976	SPD	Lower Saxony	Harburg	31.0%	4th	2013		
	Katrin Staffler	4 November 1981	CSU	Bavaria	Fürstenfeldbruck	38.0%	18th	2017		
	Nina Stahr	27 October 1982	GRÜNE	Berlin			5th	2021		
	Martina Stamm-Fibich	23 April 1965	SPD	Bavaria			18th	2013		
	Bettina Stark-Watzinger	12 May 1968	FDP	Hesse			1st	2017		
	Till Steffen	22 July 1973	GRÜNE	Hamburg	Hamburg-Eimsbüttel	29.8%	2nd	2021		
	Wolfgang Stefinger	20 April 1985	CSU	Bavaria	Munich East	31.7%		2013		
	Albert Stegemann	9 March 1976	CDU	Lower Saxony	Mittelems	40.5%	29th	2013		
	Ralf Stegner	2 October 1959	SPD	Schleswig-Holstein	Pinneberg	31.2%	3rd	2021		
	Mathias Stein	21 February 1970	SPD	Schleswig-Holstein	Kiel	29.5%	7th	2017		
	Johannes Steiniger	18 June 1987	CDU	Rhineland-Palatinate	Neustadt – Speyer	30.2%	8th	2013		
	Hanna Steinmüller	9 April 1993	GRÜNE	Berlin	Berlin-Mitte	30.5%	9th	2021		
	Christian von Stetten	24 July 1970	CDU	Baden-Württemberg	Schwäbisch Hall – Hohenlohe	32.1%		2002		
	Nadja Sthamer	13 March 1990	SPD	Saxony			6th	2021		
	Dieter Stier	29 June 1964	CDU	Saxony-Anhalt	Burgenland – Saalekreis	26.3%	2nd	2009		
	Konrad Stockmeier	3 May 1977	FDP	Baden-Württemberg			13th	2021		
	Klaus Stöber	11 September 1961	AfD	Thuringia	Eisenach – Wartburgkreis – Unstrut-Hainich-Kreis	24.8%		2021		
	Beatrix von Storch	27 May 1971	AfD	Berlin			1st	2017		
	Stephan Stracke	1 April 1974	CSU	Bavaria	Ostallgäu	38.8%		2009		
	Benjamin Strasser	9 February 1987	FDP	Baden-Württemberg			6th	2017		
	Max Straubinger	12 August 1954	CSU	Bavaria	Rottal-Inn	35.1%		1994		
	Wolfgang Strengmann-Kuhn	20 May 1964	GRÜNE	Hesse			4th	2008		
	Ruppert Stüwe	21 May 1978	SPD	Berlin			5th	2021		
	Christina Stumpp	16 November 1987	CDU	Baden-Württemberg	Waiblingen	29.0%		2021		
	Jessica Tatti	22 April 1981	BSW	Baden-Württemberg			3rd	2017	Resigned from LINKE on 23 Oct 2023	
	Claudia Tausend	22 July 1964	SPD	Bavaria			10th	2013		
	Hermann-Josef Tebroke	19 January 1964	CDU	North Rhine-Westphalia	Rheinisch-Bergischer Kreis	30.0%	41st	2017		
	Awet Tesfaiesus	5 October 1974	GRÜNE	Hesse			9th	2021		
	Linda Teuteberg	22 April 1981	FDP	Brandenburg			1st	2017		
	Jens Teutrine	22 October 1993	FDP	North Rhine-Westphalia			18th	2021		
	Michael Thews	6 September 1964	SPD	North Rhine-Westphalia	Hamm – Unna II	40.6%	48th	2013		
	Hans-Jürgen Thies	11 August 1955	CDU	North Rhine-Westphalia	Soest	33.1%	31st	2017		
	Stephan Thomae	19 June 1968	FDP	Bavaria			6th	2009–2013, 2017		
	Alexander Throm	8 September 1968	CDU	Baden-Württemberg	Heilbronn	27.8%	13th	2017		
	Antje Tillmann	28 August 1964	CDU	Thuringia			2nd	2017		
	Astrid Timmermann-Fechter	22 June 1963	CDU	North Rhine-Westphalia			10th	2013–2017, 2021		
	Nico Tippelt	25 April 1967	FDP	Saxony			5th	2021		
	Manfred Todtenhausen	8 December 1950	FDP	North Rhine-Westphalia			19th	2012–2013, 2017		
	Markus Töns	1 January 1964	SPD	North Rhine-Westphalia	Gelsenkirchen	40.5%	56th	2017		
	Florian Toncar	18 October 1979	FDP	Baden-Württemberg			5th	2005–2013, 2017		
	Carsten Träger	25 October 1973	SPD	Bavaria			3rd	2013		
	Anja Troff-Schaffarzyk	1 October 1969	SPD	Lower Saxony			14th	2021		
	Derya Türk-Nachbaur	10 April 1973	SPD	Baden-Württemberg			19th	2021		
	Markus Uhl	31 October 1979	CDU	Saarland			4th	2017	Moved up after Peter Altmaier declined his mandate	
	Katrin Uhlig	5 July 1982	GRÜNE	North Rhine-Westphalia	Bonn	25.2%	15th	2021		
	Andrew Ullmann	2 January 1963	FDP	Bavaria			10th	2017		
	Frank Ullrich	24 January 1958	SPD	Thuringia	Suhl – Schmalkalden-Meiningen – Hildburghausen – Sonneberg	33.6%	3rd	2021		
	Gerald Ullrich	23 December 1962	FDP	Thuringia			1st	2017		
	Volker Ullrich	14 October 1975	CSU	Bavaria	Augsburg-Stadt	28.1%	19th	2013		
	Alexander Ulrich	11 February 1971	BSW	Rhineland-Palatinate			1st	2005	Resigned from LINKE on 23 Oct 2023	
	Julia Verlinden	18 January 1979	GRÜNE	Lower Saxony			5th	2017		
	Kerstin Vieregge	6 September 1976	CDU	North Rhine-Westphalia			17th	2017		
	Marja-Liisa Völlers	28 September 1984	SPD	Lower Saxony	Nienburg II – Schaumburg	35.3%	16th	2017		
	Dirk Vöpel	29 May 1971	SPD	North Rhine-Westphalia	Oberhausen – Wesel III	38.8%	63rd	2013		
	Johannes Vogel	29 April 1982	FDP	North Rhine-Westphalia			5th	2009–2013, 2017		
	Kathrin Vogler	29 September 1963	LINKE	North Rhine-Westphalia			5th	2009		
	Oliver Vogt	15 July 1977	CDU	North Rhine-Westphalia			19th	2021		
	Emily Vontz	15 October 2000	SPD	Saarland			20th	2023	Baby of the House; Moved up after the resignation of Heiko Maas	
	Christoph de Vries	4 December 1974	CDU	Hamburg			3rd	2017		
	Johann Wadephul	10 February 1963	CDU	Schleswig-Holstein			1st	2009		
	Tim Wagner	5 May 1981	FDP	Thuringia			3rd	2019–2021, 2024	Moved up after the resignation of Reginald Hanke	
	Niklas Wagener	16 April 1998	GRÜNE	Bavaria			14th	2021		
	Robin Wagener	16 August 1980	GRÜNE	North Rhine-Westphalia			10th	2021		
	Sahra Wagenknecht	16 July 1969	BSW	North Rhine-Westphalia			1st	2009	Resigned from LINKE on 23 Oct 2023; BSW group leader	
	Carolin Wagner	1 October 1982	SPD	Bavaria			22nd	2021		
	Johannes Wagner	1 August 1991	GRÜNE	Bavaria			16th	2021		
	Maja Wallstein	18 March 1986	SPD	Brandenburg	Cottbus – Spree-Neiße	27.6%	2nd	2021		
	Hannes Walter	2 March 1984	SPD	Brandenburg	Elbe-Elster – Oberspreewald-Lausitz II	25.4%	7th	2021		
	Beate Walter-Rosenheimer	20 November 1964	GRÜNE	Bavaria			19th	2012		
	Marco Wanderwitz	10 October 1975	CDU	Saxony			1st	2002		
	Nina Warken	15 May 1979	CDU	Baden-Württemberg	Odenwald – Tauber	35.8%		2013–2017, 2018		
	Sandra Weeser	8 September 1969	FDP	Rhineland-Palatinate			4th	2017		
	Carmen Wegge	24 September 1989	SPD	Bavaria			20th	2021		
	Melanie Wegling	7 January 1990	SPD	Hesse	Groß-Gerau	33.5%	18th	2021		
	Alice Weidel	6 February 1979	AfD	Baden-Württemberg			1st	2017	Faction co-leader; Party co-leader (from Jun 2022)	
	Joe Weingarten	17 March 1962	SPD	Rhineland-Palatinate	Kreuznach	33.0%	14th	2019		
	Anja Weisgerber	11 March 1976	CSU	Bavaria	Schweinfurt	40.9%	8th	2013		
	Saskia Weishaupt	20 September 1993	GRÜNE	Bavaria			11th	2021		
	Maria-Lena Weiss	4 April 1981	CDU	Baden-Württemberg	Rottweil – Tuttlingen	31.5%		2021		
	Sabine Weiss	26 May 1958	CDU	North Rhine-Westphalia			13th	2009		
	Ingo Wellenreuther	16 December 1959	CDU	Baden-Württemberg			8th	2002–2021, 2024	Moved up after the resignation of Diana Stöcker	
	Stefan Wenzel	5 May 1962	GRÜNE	Lower Saxony			10th	2021		
	Lena Werner	8 October 1994	SPD	Rhineland-Palatinate			10th	2021		
	Nicole Westig	13 November 1967	FDP	North Rhine-Westphalia			10th	2017		
	Bernd Westphal	30 September 1960	SPD	Lower Saxony	Hildesheim	38.7%	13th	2013		
	Harald Weyel	30 August 1959	AfD	North Rhine-Westphalia			9th	2017		
	Kai Whittaker	10 April 1985	CDU	Baden-Württemberg	Rastatt	33.2%		2013		
	Annette Widmann-Mauz	13 June 1966	CDU	Baden-Württemberg	Tübingen	27.0%	2nd	1998		
	Wolfgang Wiehle	20 October 1964	AfD	Bavaria			7th	2017		
	Klaus Wiener	21 August 1962	CDU	North Rhine-Westphalia	Mettmann I	30.0%	51st	2021		
	Dirk Wiese	11 July 1983	SPD	North Rhine-Westphalia			2nd	2013		
	Bettina Wiesmann	20 October 1966	CDU	Hesse	Wiesbaden	22.5%	8th	2017–2021, 2024	Moved up after the resignation of Armin Schwarz	
	Katharina Willkomm	19 February 1987	FDP	North Rhine-Westphalia			20th	2017–2021, 2023	Moved up after the resignation of Alexander Graf Lambsdorff	
	Klaus-Peter Willsch	28 February 1961	CDU	Hesse	Rheingau-Taunus – Limburg	30.2%	9th	1998		
	Elisabeth Winkelmeier-Becker	15 September 1962	CDU	North Rhine-Westphalia	Rhein-Sieg-Kreis I	32.6%	5th	2005		
	Tobias Winkler	16 January 1978	CSU	Bavaria	Fürth	33.5%	35th	2021		
	Tina Winklmann	26 February 1980	GRÜNE	Bavaria			17th	2021		
	Christian Wirth	27 April 1963	AfD	Saarland			1st	2017		
	Volker Wissing	22 April 1970	Ind. (former FDP)	Rhineland-Palatinate			1st	2004–2013, 2017	Elected for the FDP; resigned from the party on 7 Nov 2024	
	Janine Wissler	23 May 1981	LINKE	Hesse			1st	2021	Party co-leader	
	Uwe Witt	1 October 1959	BD	Schleswig-Holstein			1st	2017	Elected for the AfD; sat as non-attached member since 30 Dec 2021; member of Centre Party Jan-Aug 2022; joined BD on 23 Dec 2024	
	Mechthilde Wittmann	12 December 1967	CSU	Bavaria	Oberallgäu	29.7%	14th	2021		
	Herbert Wollmann	14 January 1951	SPD	Saxony-Anhalt	Altmark	27.5%	8th	2021		
	Mareike Wulf	15 November 1979	CDU	Lower Saxony			9th	2021		
	Joachim Wundrak	28 May 1955	AfD	Lower Saxony			1st	2021		
	Gülistan Yüksel	27 March 1962	SPD	North Rhine-Westphalia			22nd	2013		
	Emmi Zeulner	27 March 1987	CSU	Bavaria	Kulmbach	47.8%	10th	2013		
	Kay-Uwe Ziegler	27 October 1963	AfD	Saxony-Anhalt	Anhalt	24.2%		2021		
	Paul Ziemiak	6 September 1985	CDU	North Rhine-Westphalia	Märkischer Kreis II	33.6%	6th	2017		
	Stefan Zierke	5 December 1970	SPD	Brandenburg	Uckermark – Barnim I	29.6%	3rd	2013		
	Jens Zimmermann	9 September 1981	SPD	Hesse	Odenwald	32.3%	7th	2013		
	Nicolas Zippelius	1 August 1987	CDU	Baden-Württemberg	Karlsruhe-Land	30.4%		2021		
	Armand Zorn	18 July 1988	SPD	Hesse	Frankfurt am Main I	29.0%	23rd	2021		
	Katrin Zschau	9 June 1976	SPD	Mecklenburg-Vorpommern	Rostock – Landkreis Rostock II	27.0%	4th	2021		

== List of former members ==
Image	Name	Date of birth	Party	State	Constituency	Vote %	List #	Member since	Date of departure	Notes	Ref.
	Peter Altmaier	18 June 1958	CDU	Saarland			2nd	1994	9 October 2021	Declined his mandate; Replaced by Markus Uhl	
	Yasmin Fahimi	25 December 1967	SPD	Lower Saxony	Stadt Hannover II	32.9%	8th	2017	30 May 2022	Resigned to become president of the DGB; Replaced by Daniela De Ridder	
	Christian Jung	22 December 1977	FDP	Baden-Württemberg			10th	2017	28 September 2021	Declined his mandate; Replaced by Claudia Raffelhüschen	
	Katja Kipping	18 January 1978	LINKE	Saxony			1st	2005	3 January 2022	Resigned to join the Giffey senate; Replaced by Clara Bünger	
	Annegret Kramp-Karrenbauer	9 August 1962	CDU	Saarland			1st	1998, 2021	9 October 2021	Declined her mandate; Replaced by Nadine Schön	
	Rainer Keller	4 December 1965	SPD	North Rhine-Westphalia	Wesel I	34.2%	61st	2021	22 September 2022	Died; Replaced by Daniel Rinkert	
	Oliver Krischer	26 July 1969	GRÜNE	North Rhine-Westphalia	Aachen I	30.2%	2nd	2009	28 June 2022	Resigned to join the Second Wüst cabinet; Replaced by Michael Sacher	
	Thomas Sattelberger	5 June 1949	FDP	Bavaria			5th	2017	1 August 2022	Resigned; Replaced by Nils Gründer	
	Falko Mohrs	23 July 1984	SPD	Lower Saxony	Helmstedt – Wolfsburg	42.1%	19th	2017	7 November 2022	Resigned to join the second Weil cabinet as state minister; Replaced by Alexander Bartz	
	Heiko Maas	19 September 1966	SPD	Saarland	Saarlouis	36.7%	1st	2017	16 December 2022	Resigned; Replaced by Emily Vontz	
	Andreas Philippi	4 July 1965	SPD	Lower Saxony	Göttingen	32.1%	1st	2021	24 January 2023	Resigned to join the Third Weil cabinet as Minister for Social Affairs, Labour, Health and Equal Opportunities; Replaced by Dirk-Ulrich Mende	
	Gero Storjohann	12 February 1958	CDU	Schleswig-Holstein	Segeberg – Stormarn-Nord	27.9%	2nd	2002	29 January 2023	Died; Replaced by Melanie Bernstein	
	Corinna Miazga	17 May 1983	AfD	Bavaria	Straubing	12.7%	2nd	2017	25 February 2023	Died; Replaced by Rainer Rothfuß	
	Michael Hennrich	14 January 1965	CDU	Baden-Württemberg	Nürtingen	30.1	1st	2002	28 February 2023	Resigned; Replaced by Alexander Föhr	
	Cansel Kiziltepe	8 October 1975	SPD	Berlin			2nd	2013	15 May 2023	Resigned to join the Wegner senate as Senator for Labour, Social Affairs, Equality, Integration, Diversity and Anti-Discrimination; Replaced by Ana-Maria Trăsnea	
	Alexander Graf Lambsdorff	5 November 1966	FDP	North Rhine-Westphalia			3rd	2017	7 August 2023	Resigned to become German Ambassador to Russia; Replaced by Katharina Willkomm	
	Hagen Reinhold	23 March 1978	FDP	Mecklenburg-Vorpommern	Rostock – Landkreis Rostock II		1st	2013, 2017	3 September 2023	Resigned; Replaced by Christian Bartelt	
	Wolfgang Schäuble	18 September 1942	CDU	Baden-Württemberg	Offenburg		1st	1972	26 December 2023	Died; Replaced by Stefan Kaufmann	
	André Berghegger	5 July 1972	CDU	Lower Saxony	Osnabrück-Land	36.2%	22nd	2013	31 December 2023	Resigned to become general manager of the DStGB; Replaced by Ingrid Pahlmann	
	Reginald Hanke	25 August 1956	FDP	Thuringia			2nd	2019	31 December 2023	Resigned; Replaced by Tim Wagner	
	Jürgen Trittin	25 July 1954	GRÜNE	Lower Saxony	Göttingen		3rd	1998	31 December 2023	Resigned; Replaced by Ottmar von Holtz	
	Timon Gremmels	4 January 1976	SPD	Hesse	Kassel	36.1%	25th	2017	25 January 2024	Resigned to join the second Rhein cabinet as state minister; Replaced by Nadine Ruf	
	Ingmar Jung	4 April 1978	CDU	Hesse	Wiesbaden	26.3%	12th	2017	25 January 2024	Resigned to join the second Rhein cabinet as state minister; Replaced by Astrid Mannes	
	Kaweh Mansoori	12 August 1988	SPD	Hesse			3rd	2021	25 January 2024	Resigned to join the second Rhein cabinet as state minister; Replaced by Martin Rabanus	
	Armin Schwarz	3 June 1968	CDU	Hesse			6th	2021	25 January 2024	Resigned to join the second Rhein cabinet as state minister; Replaced by Bettina Wiesmann	
	Christian Kühn	9 April 1979	GRÜNE	Baden-Württemberg			4th	2013	14 February 2024	Resigned; Replaced by Jürgen Kretz	
	Lars Lindemann	9 May 1971	FDP	Berlin			3rd	2009–2013, 2021	4 March 2024	Lost his seat after the repeat election in Berlin; FDP group lost a seat in the Bundestag	
	Pascal Meiser	7 March 1975	LINKE	Berlin			2nd	2017	4 March 2024	Lost his seat to Christine Buchholz after the repeat election in Berlin; Replaced by Jörg Cezanne when Buchholz declined her mandate	
	Nina Stahr	27 October 1982	GRÜNE	Berlin			5th	2021	4 March 2024	Lost her seat to Franziska Krumwiede-Steiner after the repeat election in Berlin	
	Ana-Maria Trăsnea	15 March 1994	SPD	Berlin			6th	2023	4 March 2024	Moved up on 16 May 2023 after the resignation of Cansel Kiziltepe; Lost her seat to Angela Hohmann after the repeat election in Berlin	
	Christine Buchholz	2 April 1971	LINKE	Hesse			1st	2009–2021, 2024	4 March 2024	Declined her mandate after winning her seat in the repeat election in Berlin instead of Pascal Meiser; Replaced by Jörg Cezanne	
	Uli Grötsch	14 July 1975	SPD	Bavaria			1st	2013	15 March 2024	Resigned to become police commissioner at the Bundestag; Replaced by Heike Heubach	
	Andreas Scheuer	26 September 1974	CSU	Bavaria	Passau	30.7%	3rd	2002	1 April 2024	Resigned	
	Stefan Müller	3 September 1975	CSU	Bavaria	Erlangen	35.1%	9th	2002	31 May 2024	Resigned	
	Diana Stöcker	19 May 1970	CDU	Baden-Württemberg	Lörrach – Müllheim	25.2%		2021	2 June 2024	Resigned to become mayor of Weil am Rhein; Replaced by Ingo Wellenreuther	
	Petr Bystron	30 November 1972	AfD	Bavaria			4th	2017	15 July 2024	Resigned to sit as member of the European Parliament; Replaced by Manfred Schiller	
	Marc Jongen	23 May 1968	AfD	Baden-Württemberg			5th	2017	15 July 2024	Resigned to sit as member of the European Parliament; Replaced by Volker Münz	
	Marie-Agnes Strack-Zimmermann	10 March 1958	FDP	North Rhine-Westphalia			2nd	2017	15 July 2024	Resigned to sit as member of the European Parliament; Replaced by Fabian Griewel	
	Michael Theurer	12 January 1967	FDP	Baden-Württemberg			1st	2017	1 September 2024	Resigned to became a member of the Deutsche Bundesbank's executive board; Replaced by Julian Grünke	
	Manuela Rottmann	5 September 1972	GRÜNE	Bavaria			5th	2017	1 December 2024	Resigned on her election to her party's executive board; Replaced by Uwe Kekeritz	
	Takis Mehmet Ali	17 June 1991	SPD	Baden-Württemberg			22nd	2021	31 December 2024	Resigned; Replaced by Lucia Schanbacher	
	Stephanie Aeffner	29 April 1976	GRÜNE	Baden-Württemberg			15th	2021	15 January 2025	Died; Replaced by Johannes Kretschmann	

== See also ==
- Politics of Germany
- List of Bundestag members
