= Emily Vontz =

German politician (born 2000)

Emily Vontz MdB

Member of the Bundestag from Saarland
- In office 1 January 2023 – 25 March 2025
- Preceded by: Heiko Maas

Personal details
- Born: 15 October 2000 (age 25) Merzig, Saarland, Germany
- Party: SPD
- Education: University of Trier (BA) (enrolled)
- Occupation: Student, politician
- Website: emily-vontz.de

Emily Vontz (German pronunciation: [foːnts] born 15 October 2000) is a German politician of the Social Democratic Party (SPD) who has been serving as a Member of the German Bundestag from Saarland since January 2023. She was the youngest member of the 20th Bundestag and the first German MP to be born in the 2000s.

== Early life and education ==
Vontz was born 15 October 2000 in Merzig, Germany, into a Catholic family, and grew up in Losheim am See. She completed her Abitur at Hochwald-Gymnasium in Wadern, and then completed a volunteer year at Goethe-Institut in Bordeaux. Since 2021, she is enrolled at the University of Trier, where she currently seeks a degree in political science and French.

In mid-2020, Vontz became a working student for the SPD group in the State Parliament of Saarland.

== Political career ==
Vontz has been a member of the Young Socialists in the SPD since 2017 and since 2018 in the SPD.

In the 2021 German federal election Vontz was not elected to the Bundestag, but she assumed office on 1 January 2023 succeeding Heiko Maas after he resigned. In September 2024, she announced that she would not stand in the 2025 federal elections.

== Bibliography ==
Among others such as Gregor Gysi and Olaf Scholz, Vontz contributed to Ulrich Wickert‘s book Wir haben die Macht – Handbuch fürs Einmischen in Politik und Gesellschaft. Carlsen. March 2024. ISBN 9783551251558.

== See also ==
- List of members of the 20th Bundestag
