= Knut Gerschau =

German politician (born 1961)

Knut Gerschau (born 3 July 1961) is a German politician of the Free Democratic Party (FDP) who served as a member of the Bundestag from 2021 to 2025.

Gerschau is a past chairman of the board of the German Foundation for World Population (DSW) and state chairman of the Liberaler Mittelstand Lower Saxony.

Gerschau did not stand for re-election in the 2025 German federal election.

== Career ==
Gerschau was born 1963 in the West German city of Bremen and grew up in Bremerhaven and, following his move to Wilhelmshaven, later earned his Abitur in Bremen. After completing his military service in Bremen and Schleswig-Holstein, Gerschau moved to Hanover.

In 1984 Knut Gerschau and Robert Kroth founded the Gerschau.Kroth.Werbeagentur. GmbH (now LEADS-Marketing) in Hanover. He has been their managing partner since the company was founded.

== Social and political commitment ==
Knut Gerschau, a member of the 16th Federal Assembly participated in the election of the German Federal President on 12 February 2017.

He also holds several honorary offices:

- Board member of the German Foundation for World Population (DSW) from 2010 to 2019.
- Member of the Board of Trustees of the Rudolf von Bennigsen Foundation
- Chairman of the Society of Friends of the Rudolf-von-Bennigsen-Foundation e. V.
- State chairman of the Liberaler Mittelstand Niedersachsen e. V. (Liberal Middle Classes of Lower Saxony).

Gerschau is involved in Hanover in the district foundation Sahlkamp-Vahrenheide.

In 2021 he was elected as a member of the Bundestag. In 2024, Gerschau announced that he isn't seeking re-election for Bundestag.

== Private ==
Knut Gerschau is single and father of two children.

== See also ==
- List of members of the 20th Bundestag
- 2021 German federal election
