= Claudia Raffelhüschen =

German politician (born 1968)

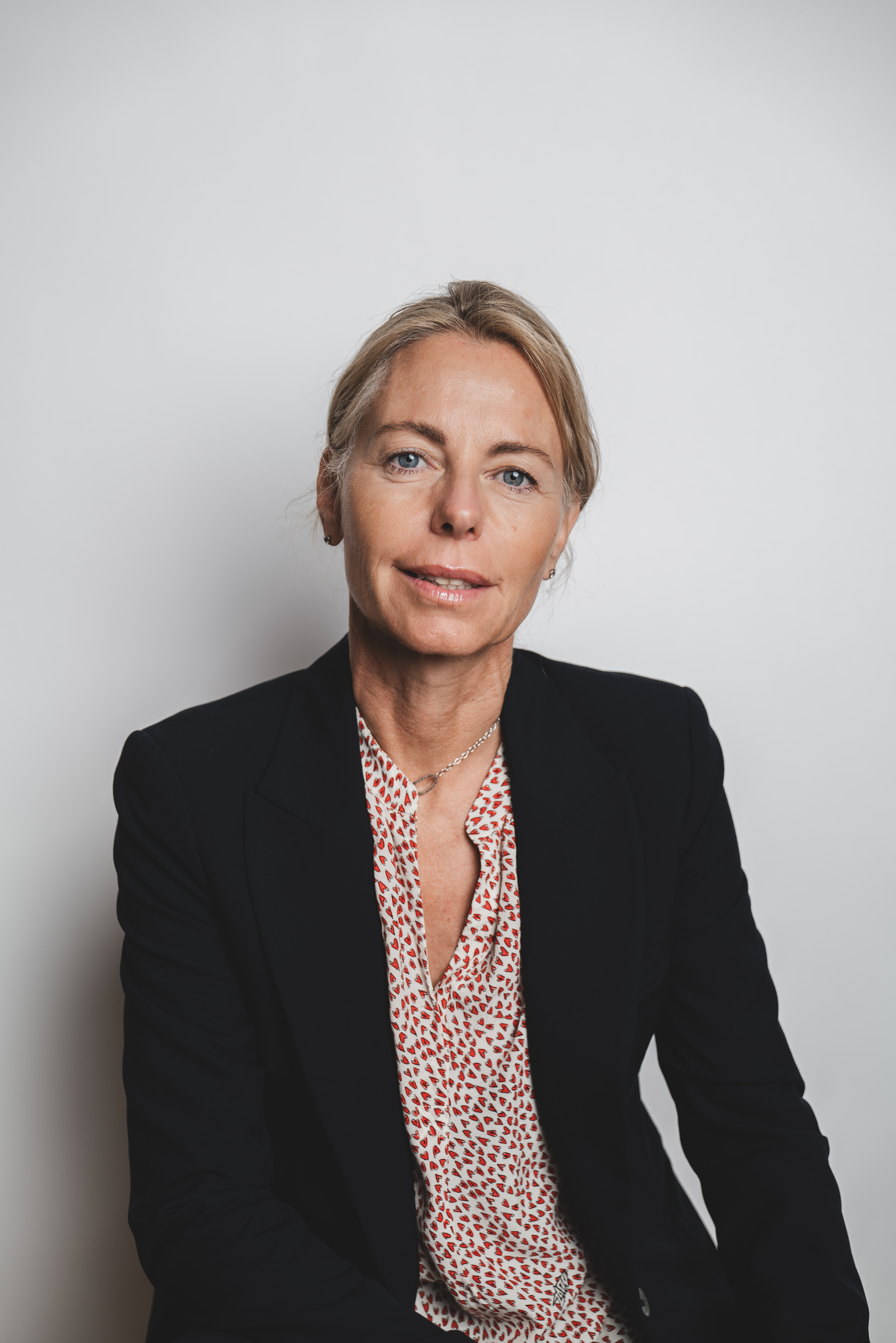

Personal details
- Born: November 7, 1968 (age 57)
- Party: Free Democratic Party (Germany)
- Occupation: Economist

Claudia Raffelhüschen (born 1968 in Cologne) is a German economist and politician of the Free Democratic Party (FDP) who served as a Member of the German Bundestag from 2021 to 2025, representing the Freiburg district.

== Political career ==
Raffelhüschen took the seat of Christian Jung, who resigned his seat right after the 2021 federal election.

In parliament, Raffelhüschen served on the Finance Committee, the Budget Committee and the Audit Committee. On the Budget Committee, she was her parliamentary group’s rapporteur on the annual budget of the Federal Ministry for Economic Cooperation and Development.

== Other activities ==
- GIZ, Member of the Supervisory Board (since 2022)
- Plan International – Germany, Member of the Board of Trustees (since 2022)

== See also ==
- List of members of the 20th Bundestag
