= Angela Hohmann =

German politician (born 1963)

Member of the German Bundestag
- In office 2024–2025

Personal details
- Born: 10 April 1963 (age 62) Celle
- Party: SPD

Angela Hohmann (born 10 April 1963 in Celle) is a German politician from the SPD. She was a Member of the German Bundestag from Berlin from 2024 to 2025.

== Biography ==
After graduating from secondary school, Hohmann trained as a social insurance clerk from 1981 to 1984. From 1984 until her early retirement in 2018, she worked for DAK-Gesundheit.

Hohmann is a member of several organizations, including Ver.di and Greenpeace. From 1984 to 2004, she was a board member and financial officer of the Rheuma-Liga Celle self-help group.

Hohmann is divorced and has a son. She lives in Celle.

== Political career ==
Hohmann joined the SPD in 2002. She has been a member of the executive board of the Celle SPD local branch since 2004 and was elected deputy chairwoman of the Celle sub-district on 22 April 2023. In December 2023, Hohmann was elected to the SPD party executive.

She has been a member of the district council in the Celle district since 2006, social policy spokesperson for her parliamentary group since 2008, and leader of the SPD parliamentary group in the district council since 2021.

In the 2021 federal election, Hohmann was placed 28th on the SPD state list in Lower Saxony, but did not receive a seat. Only through the result of the partial repeat election on 11 February 2024 in Berlin was she able to win a seat in the German Bundestag, which she took up on 4 March 2024.

She was not returned after the 2025 German federal election.

== See also ==
- List of members of the 20th Bundestag
