= Corinna Miazga =

German politician (1983–2023)

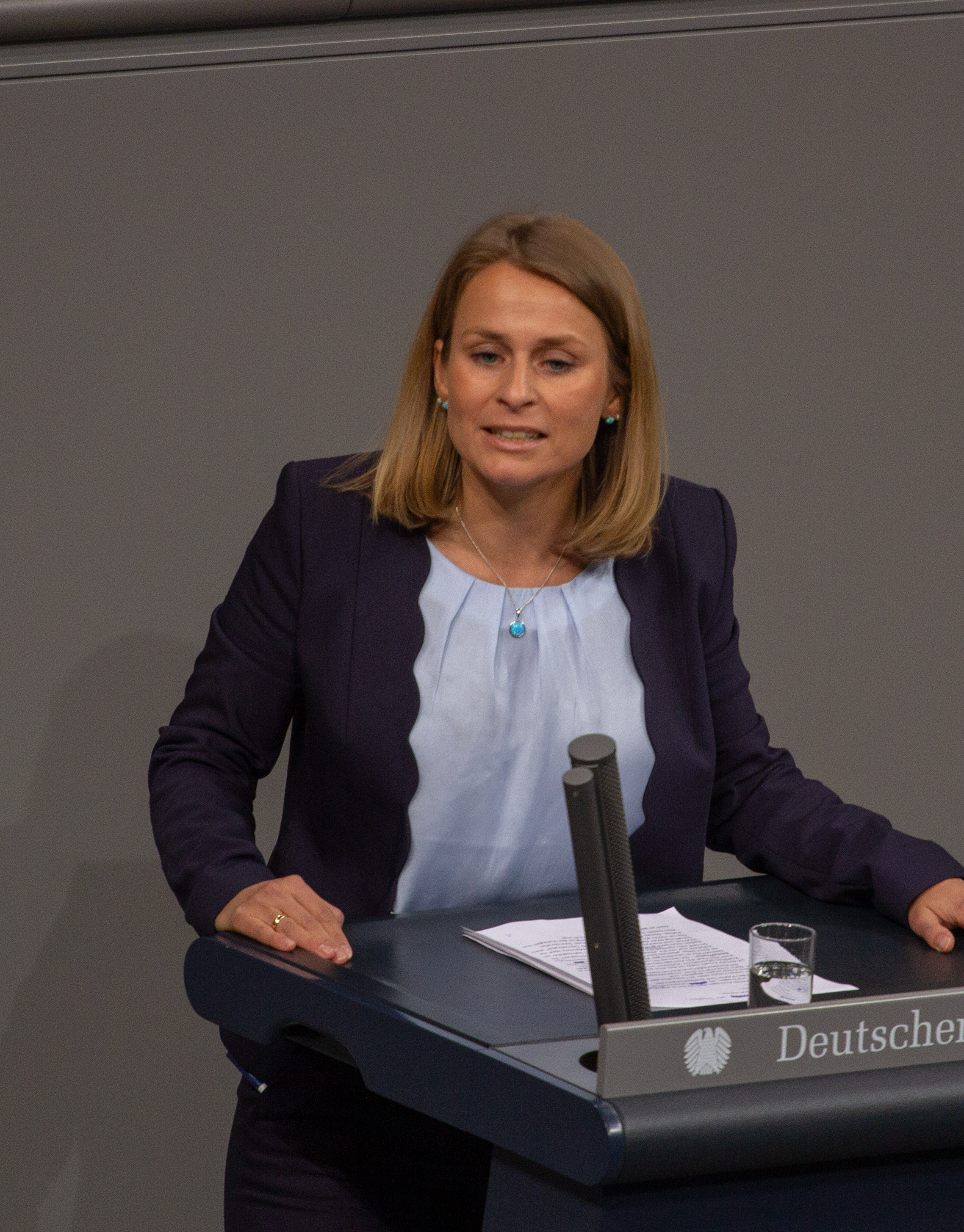
- Miazga in 2019

Member of the Bundestag
- In office 2017 – 25 February 2023
- Succeeded by: Rainer Rothfuß

Personal details
- Born: Corinna Kracke; 17 May 1983 Oldenburg, Lower Saxony, West Germany (now Germany)
- Died: 25 February 2023 (aged 39) Germany
- Party: AfD

Corinna Miazga (née Kracke; 17 May 1983 – 25 February 2023) was a German politician. Representing Alternative for Germany (AfD), Miazga served as a member of the Bundestag from the state of Bavaria from 2017 until her death in 2023.

== Life and career ==
Corinna Kracke was born in Oldenburg in 1983. She grew up in Hude, Lower Saxony, and studied law (without completing a degree). She became member of German Bundestag after the 2017 German federal election. She was a member of the Committee on European Union Affairs.

In 2019, there were disputes over the head of the Bavarian AfD state party. Political influencer Tom Rohrböck supported Miazga. He reportedly encouraged her to run for the state chairmanship. Rohrböck wrote to an unnamed competitor three days before the election: "I don't think you should be a candidate." A day later, he added: "You run into a trap. You don't get more than 30 percent." Shortly before the election to the state executive committee, the competitor actually withdrew his candidacy. Miazga later denied having won the state presidency due to Rohrböck's help. In November 2020, Miazga said she had breast cancer and would not be active as chairwoman of AfD Bavaria. In 2021, she was re-elected to the Bundestag on the state list coming second in Straubing. In October 2021, she lost the re-election as Bavarian party chairwoman to Stephan Protschka.

Miazga died of breast cancer on 25 February 2023, aged 39. She was replaced in the Bundestag by Rainer Rothfuß who moved up the list.
