= Ana-Maria Trăsnea =

Romanian-born German politician (born 1994)

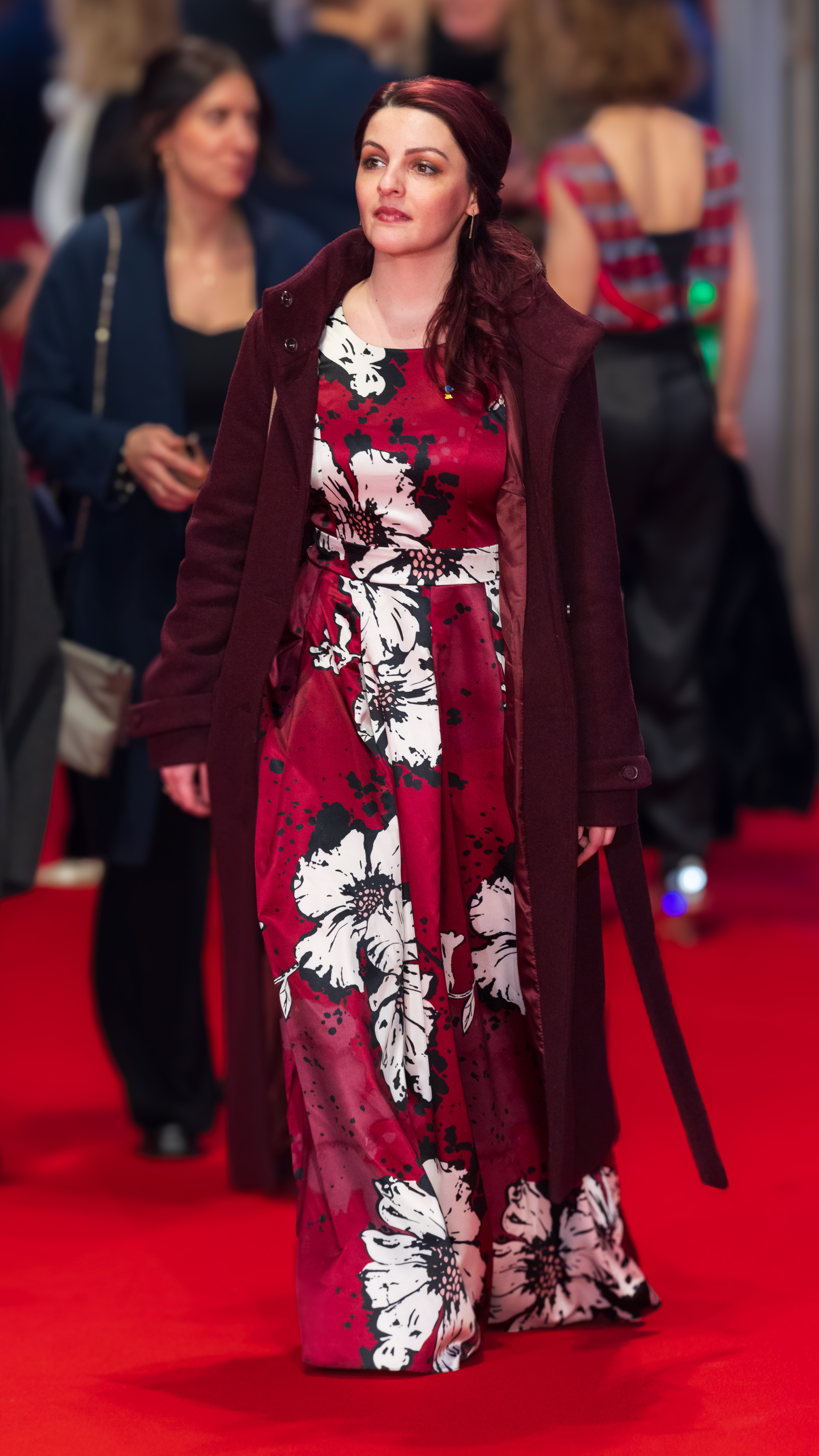
Trăsnea at the 2023 Berlinale

Ana-Maria Trăsnea (born 15 March 1994) is a Romanian-German politician (SPD). From May 2023 to March 2024, she was a member of the German Bundestag. Prior to that, from 2021 to 2023, she served as the State of Berlin’s Representative to the Federal Government and as State Secretary for Civic Engagement, Democracy Promotion, and International Affairs in the senate of Governing Mayor Franziska Giffey.

== Early life and education ==
Trăsnea was born in Piatra Neamț in Romania. Her parents split up when she was a child; her mother went to work in Germany, her father to work to France. She grew up at her aunt until she was 13 years old.

Trăsnea came to Germany from Romania in 2007. She attended the Emmy-Noether-Gymnasium in the Treptow-Köpenick district of Berlin, where she obtained her Abitur in 2013. She then studied cultural studies at the European University Viadrina in Frankfurt (Oder) from 2013 to 2018 and obtained a bachelor's degree, spending the winter semester 2015/2016 at the University of Salamanca in Spain. She then completed a master’s degree in European Studies at the European University Viadrina from 2017 to 2021, which is on hold.

From 2016 to 2019, parallel to her studies, she was a project-related workshop leader for various youth-political educational projects of the "Forum Politics and Society" in the "Political Dialogue" department of the Friedrich-Ebert-Foundation Berlin. In 2019, Trăsnea was a student assistant in the Strategic Planning Unit of the Management Staff at the Federal Ministry for Family Affairs, Senior Citizens, Women and Youth. From 2020 to 2021 she was personal assistant to the State Secretary for Youth and Family, Sigrid Klebba, in the Berlin Senate Department for Education, Youth and Family.

== Political career ==
Trăsnea joined the Social Democratic Party of Germany while she was at school and was involved in the initiative School without Racism from 2007 to 2013, organizing, among other things, an anti-racism working group at her school.

Trăsnea was a member of the Treptow-Köpenick district assembly from 2016 to 2021, where she was deputy leader of the SPD parliamentary group from 2019, and leader of the parliamentary group from 2021. In 2020 she was awarded the Helene Weber Prize. In the 2021 federal election, she ran as a direct candidate in the Berlin-Treptow-Köpenick constituency, but was not directly elected. As she was in sixth place in the state list, she initially missed entry into the Bundestag.

From December 2021 to April 2023, Trăsnea was the representative of the State of Berlin at the federal level and State Secretary for Volunteering, Democracy Promotion and International Affairs in the Berlin Senate Chancellery.

On 16 May 2023, Trăsnea moved into the German Bundestag replacing Cansel Kiziltepe. At the 2025 Federal election she ran in the district of Berlin-Treptow-Köpenick. She was defeated by long-time Die Linke politician Gregor Gysi, coming in fourth behind Gysi, as well as the AfD and CDU candidates.
