= Reginald Hanke =

German politician

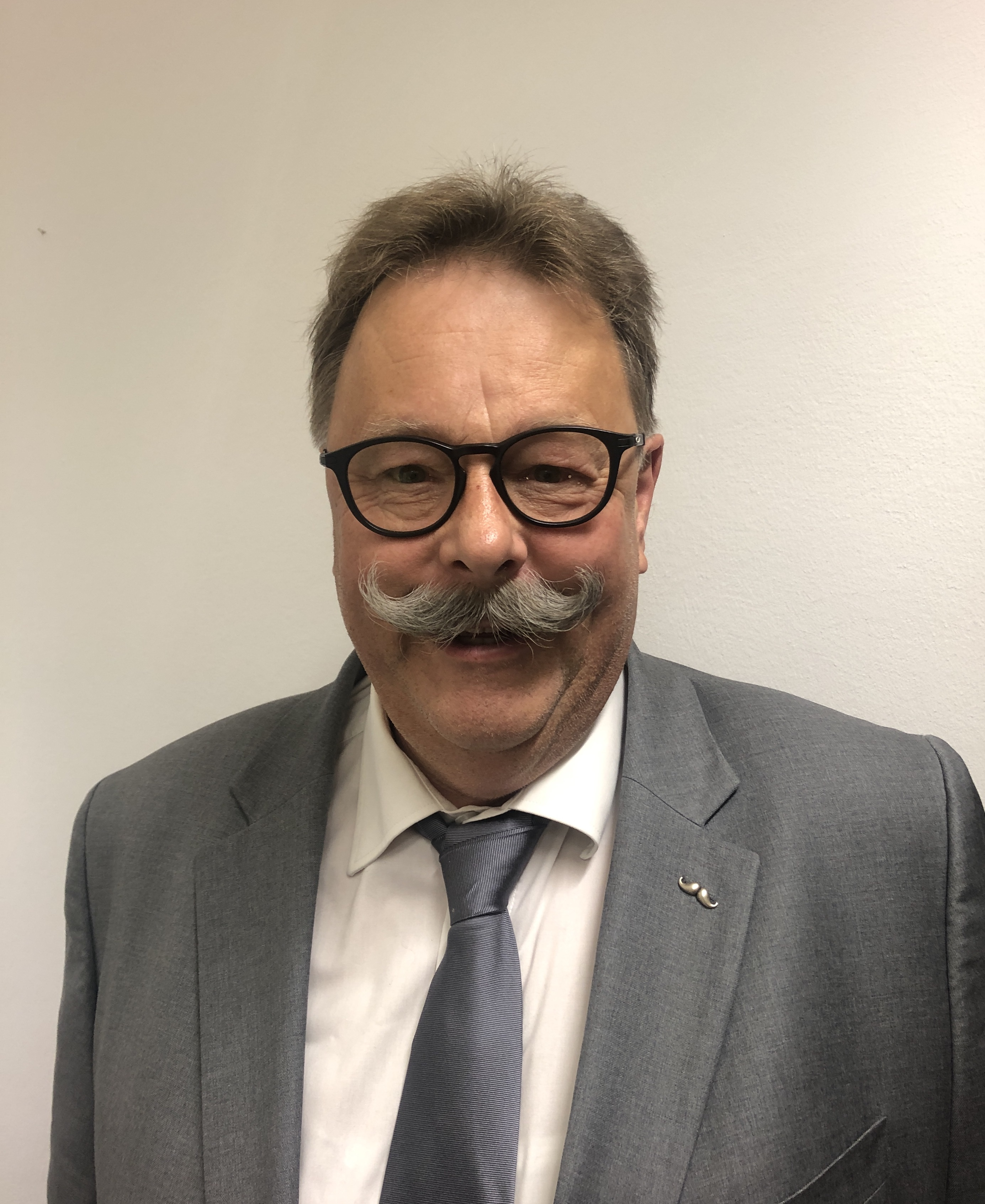
- Hanke in 2019

Member of the Bundestag for Thuringia
- In office 15 November 2019 – 31 December 2023
- Preceded by: Thomas Kemmerich
- Succeeded by: Tim Wagner
- Constituency: FDP List

Personal details
- Born: 25 August 1956 (age 69) Schwerin, East Germany (now Germany)
- Party: Free Democratic Party

Reginald Hanke (born 25 August 1956) is a German politician of the Free Democratic Party (FDP) who served as a member of the Bundestag from the state of Thuringia from 2019 to 2023.

== Early life and career ==
In 1979 Hanke began training as a decorative painter, which he followed with a master's degree. In 1985 he started his own business in Breternitz with a painting company.

== Political career ==
Hanke joined the FDP in 2014. For the Bundestag elections 2017 he ran for office in the election district Saalfeld-Rudolstadt – Saale-Holzland-Kreis – Saale-Orla-Kreis and on list number 3 of the FDP Thuringia. After the resignation of Thomas Kemmerich, Hanke became a member of the Bundestag on 15 November 2019. In parliament, he serves on the Sports Committee and the Petitions Committee.

In December 2023, Hanke announced that he would not stand in the 2025 federal elections but instead resign from active politics by the end of the year; he was replaced by Tim Wagner.
