= Ottmar von Holtz =

German politician (born 1961)

Ottmar von Holtz MdB
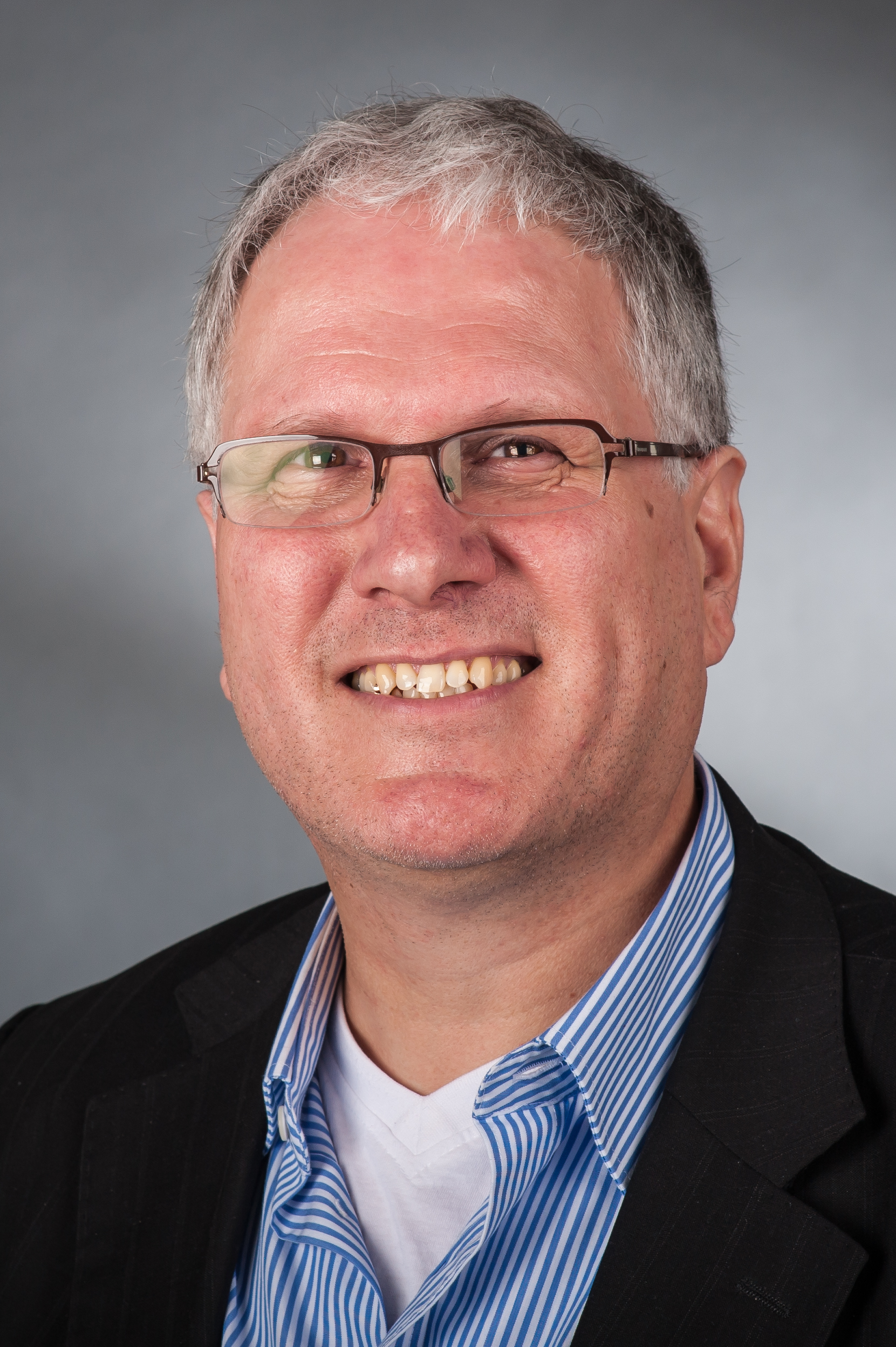
- Ottmar von Holtz in 2013

Member of the Bundestag
- In office 2017–2021
- Incumbent
- Assumed office 2024

Personal details
- Born: 27 July 1961 (age 65) Gobabis
- Party: Greens
- Children: 2
- Education: University of Hannover

Ottmar von Holtz (born 27 July 1961) is a German politician of Alliance 90/The Greens who served as a member of the Bundestag from the state of Lower Saxony since 2017. He previously served from 2017 to 2021.

== Early life and career ==
Von Holtz was born in Gobabis.

From 1982 to 1983, von Holtz studied economics (B.Comm) at the University of Stellenbosch in South Africa and until 1988, graduating with a degree in economics at the University of Hannover. In 1988, he was a lecturer in statistics and econometrics at the University of Namibia, then – after his return to Hannover – he was a lecturer and head of department at the Lower Saxony State Statistical Office until 2005.

== Political career ==
Von Holtz became a member of the Bundestag in the 2017 German federal election. In parliament, he served on the Committee on Economic Cooperation and Development, the Subcommittee on Civilian Crisis Prevention and the Subcommittee on Global Health.

When Jürgen Trittin resigned from the Bundestag, Von Holtz moved up the list.

== Other activities ==
- German Foundation for World Population (DSW), Member of the Parliamentary Advisory Board (2018–2021)
- German United Services Trade Union (ver.di), Member
