= Christian Jung =

German politician

Member of the Bundestag
- In office 2017–2021
- Succeeded by: Claudia Raffelhüschen

Personal details
- Born: 22 December 1977 (age 48) Heidelberg, West Germany (now Germany)
- Party: FDP
- Education: University of Heidelberg
- Occupation: Teacher

Christian Jung (born 22 December 1977) is a German politician of the Free Democratic Party (FDP) who has been serving as a member of the State Parliament of Baden-Württemberg since the 2021 elections. He was previously a member of the Bundestag from 2017 until 2021.

== Education and early career ==
From 1998 to 2004, Jung studied history to become a teacher at a grammar school at the University of Heidelberg. There he received his doctorate in 2006 with a thesis on the history of the GDR. From 2007, he worked as a secondary school teacher, including at the Hohenstaufen Gymnasium in Eberbach, and from 2012 as director of studies at the Ellental Gymnasium in Bietigheim-Bissingen.

== Political career ==
Jung became member of the Bundestag in the 2017 German federal election, representing the Karlsruhe-Land district. In parliament, he served on the Committee on Transport and Digital Infrastructure. In this capacity, he was his parliamentary group's rapporteur on freight transport.

Following the 2021 state elections in Baden-Württemberg, Jung resigned from the Bundestag and became a member of the Landtag of Baden-Württemberg instead. He was replaced as a Member of the German Bundestag by Claudia Raffelhüschen.

Jung was nominated by his party as delegate to the Federal Convention for the purpose of electing the President of Germany in 2022.
