= Rainer Rothfuß =

Member of the Bundestag since 2023

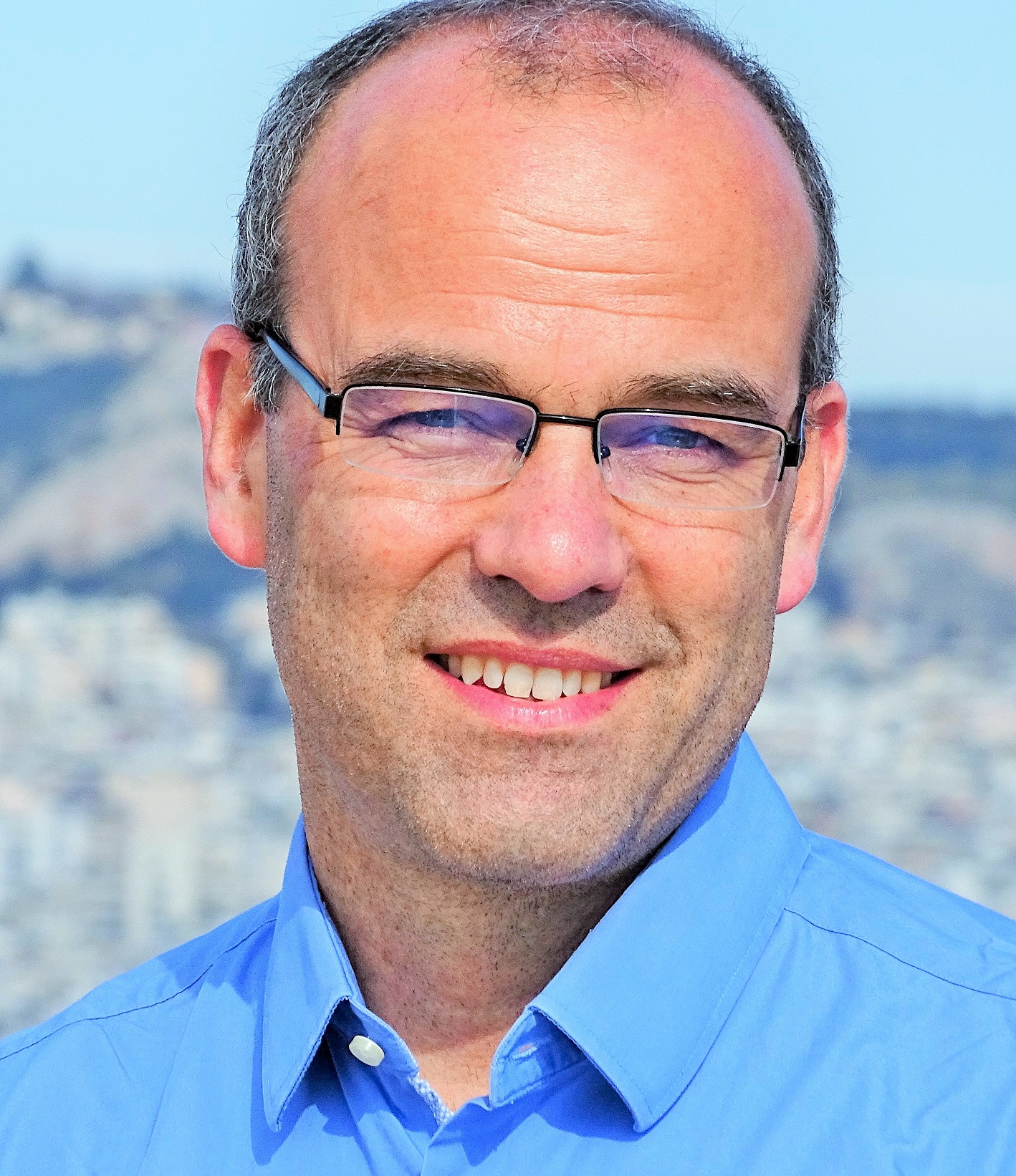
- Rothfuß in 2019

Member of the Bundestag
- Incumbent
- Assumed office 2 March 2023
- Preceded by: Corinna Miazga
- Constituency: Bavaria

Personal details
- Born: 19 April 1971 (age 54) Freudenstadt, West Germany
- Party: Alternative for Germany (2018–present)
- Other political affiliations: Christian Social Union in Bavaria (2004–2017)

Rainer Rothfuß (born 19 April 1971) is a German politician of the Alternative for Germany (AfD) who has been serving as a member of the Bundestag for Bavaria since 2023.

== Life and politics ==
Rothfuß was born in the West German town of Freudenstadt and studied geography in Tübingen and Stuttgart. He joined the Christian Social Union in 2004 and was active on a regional level. Rothfuß joined the Alternative for Germany in 2018.

In the 2021 German federal election, he contested Oberallgäu but came in sixth place. He joined the Bundestag in 2023 following the death of Corinna Miazga.
