= Tim Wagner =

German politician (born 1981)

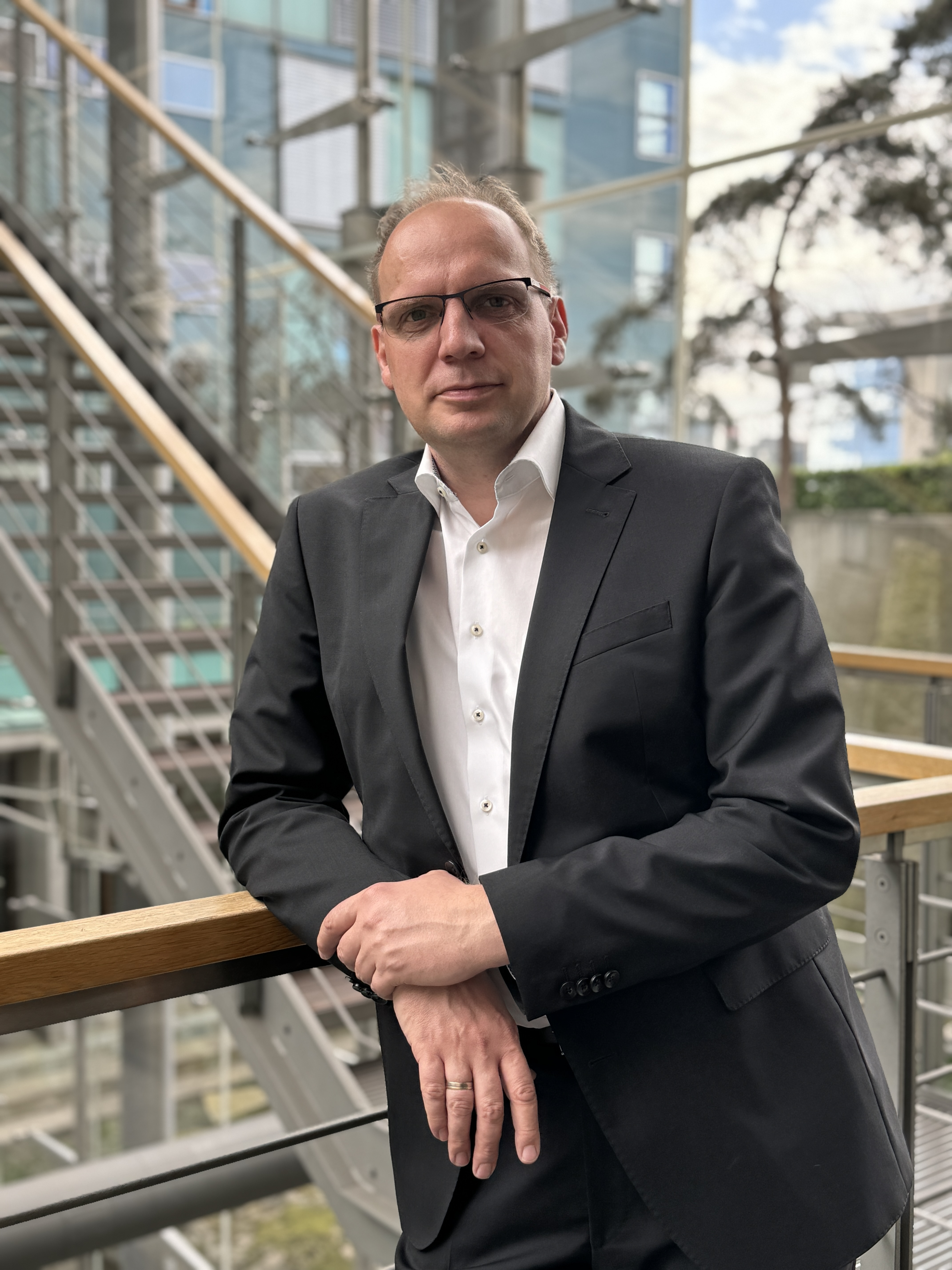

Member of the Bundestag
- In office 2024 – March 2025

Personal details
- Born: 5 May 1981 (age 45) Jena, East Germany (now Germany)
- Party: The Free Democratic Party
- Children: four
- Occupation: Politician / Financial adviser

Tim Wagner (born 5 May 1981 in Jena) is a German politician from the Free Democratic Party. He was a Member of the German Bundestag from 2024 to March 2025.

== Early life and career ==
Wagner obtained his Abitur at Ernst Haeckel academic secondary school in Jena in 1999. After that he ran two martial arts- schools for three years. Since 2003 Wagner studied business administration at the IU International University of Applied Sciences for one year and from 2004 to 2009 political science and history at Friedrich Schiller University in Jena. He has run a promotional service business since 2006 and has been head of the agency at the independent financial advisory service Deutsche Vermögensberatung since 2010. From 2017 to 2019 Wagner was head of the constituency office of Gerald Ullrich and after that Parliamentary secretary of the FDP group in the Landtag of Thuringia until 2023.

Beside that Wagner was a member of the city parents’ council for nurseries in Jena from 2011 to 2018, city parents’ spokesman and deputy Land parent spokesman for nurseries in Thuringia from 2013 to 2018 and Chairman of the association supporting the Anne Frank nursery in Jena.

== Political career ==
Wagner joined the FDP in 2009. He held various positions since then, including deputy chairman of the Jena-Saale-Holzland county branch of the FDP; branch treasurer since 2015, member of the executive committee of the FDP Land branch since 2015, honorary executive director of the FDP Thuringia since 2017 and Treasurer of the Liberaler Mittelstand Thüringen e.V. SME association.

In the 2021 German federal election, he unsuccessfully contested Jena – Sömmerda – Weimarer Land I. In 2024, he became a Member of the German Bundestag replacing Reginald Hanke. There he is member of the Committee on Tourism and the Committee on Petitions.

In the 2025 German federal election he will be the top candidate on the state list in Thuringia.

== Personal life ==
Wagner is Protestant; married; has four children and lives with his family in Jena.
