= Petrovice =

Petrovice may refer to:

== Bosnia and Herzegovina ==
- Petrovice (Kalesija), a village in the Tuzla Canton

== Czech Republic ==
- Petrovice (Blansko District), a municipality and village in the South Moravian Region
- Petrovice (Bruntál District), a municipality and village in the Moravian-Silesian Region
- Petrovice (Hradec Králové District), a municipality and village in the Hradec Králové Region
- Petrovice (Příbram District), a municipality and village in the Central Bohemian Region
- Petrovice (Rakovník District), a municipality and village in the Central Bohemian Region
- Petrovice (Třebíč District), a municipality and village in the Vysočina Region
- Petrovice (Ústí nad Labem District), a municipality and village in the Ústí nad Labem Region
- Petrovice (Ústí nad Orlicí District), a municipality and village in the Pardubice Region
- Petrovice (Znojmo District), a municipality and village in the South Moravian Region
- Petrovice (Prague), a borough of Prague
- Petrovice, a village and part of Bystřice (Benešov District) in the Central Bohemian Region
- Petrovice, a village and part of Humpolec in the Vysočina Region
- Petrovice, a village and part of Jablonné v Podještědí in the Liberec Region
- Petrovice, a village and part of Malé Svatoňovice in the Hradec Králové Region
- Petrovice, a village and part of Měčín in the Plzeň Region
- Petrovice, a village and part of Miličín in the Central Bohemian Region
- Petrovice, a village and part of Mladošovice in the South Bohemian Region
- Petrovice, a village and part of Nové Město na Moravě in the Vysočina Region
- Petrovice, a village and part of Osek (Strakonice District) in the South Bohemian Region
- Petrovice, a village and part of Puklice in the Vysočina Region
- Petrovice, a village and part of Skorošice in the Olomouc Region
- Petrovice, a village and part of Štoky in the Vysočina Region
- Petrovice, a village and part of Týniště nad Orlicí in the Hradec Králové Region
- Petrovice, a village and part of Újezd (Domažlice District) in the Plzeň Region
- Petrovice, a village and part of Velké Petrovice in the Hradec Králové Region
- Petrovice I, a municipality and village in the Central Bohemian Region
- Petrovice II, a municipality and village in the Central Bohemian Region
- Petrovice nad Úhlavou, a village and part of Janovice nad Úhlavou in the Plzeň Region
- Petrovice u Karviné, a municipality and village in the Moravian-Silesian Region
- Petrovice u Sušice, a municipality and village in the Plzeň Region
- Petrovice u Uhelné Příbramě, a village and part of Uhelná Příbram in the Vysočina Region
- České Petrovice, a municipality and village in the Olomouc Region
- Hraničné Petrovice, a municipality and village in the Olomouc Region

== Slovakia ==
- Petrovice, Bytča District, a municipality and village

== See also ==
- Pietrowice (disambiguation)
