= Maršovice =

Maršovice may refer to places in the Czech Republic:

- Maršovice (Benešov District), a market town in the Central Bohemian Region
- Maršovice (Jablonec nad Nisou District), a municipality and village in the Liberec Region
- Maršovice, a hamlet and part of Chlum (Česká Lípa District) in the Liberec Region
- Maršovice, a village and part of Jezeřany-Maršovice in the South Moravian Region
- Maršovice, a village and part of Nové Město na Moravě in the Vysočina Region
- Maršovice, a village and part of Petrovice u Sušice in the Plzeň Region
