= Pietrowice =

Pietrowice may refer to:

- Pietrowice, Opole Voivodeship in Opole Voivodeship, Poland
- Pietrowice Małe in Lower Silesian Voivodeship, Poland
- Pietrowice Wielkie in Silesian Voivodeship, Poland
  - Gmina Pietrowice Wielkie

== See also ==
- Piotrowice (disambiguation)
- Petrovice (disambiguation)
- Petrovce (disambiguation)
