= Cademartori =

Cademartori is an Italian surname. Notable people with the surname include:

- José Cademartori (1930 - 2024), Chilean commercial engineer, writer, academic and politician
- Isabel Cademartori (born 1988), German politician
- Danny Cadamarteri (born 1979), English footballer (surname incorrectly transcribed upon immigration to England)
