= Kordula Kovac =

German politician

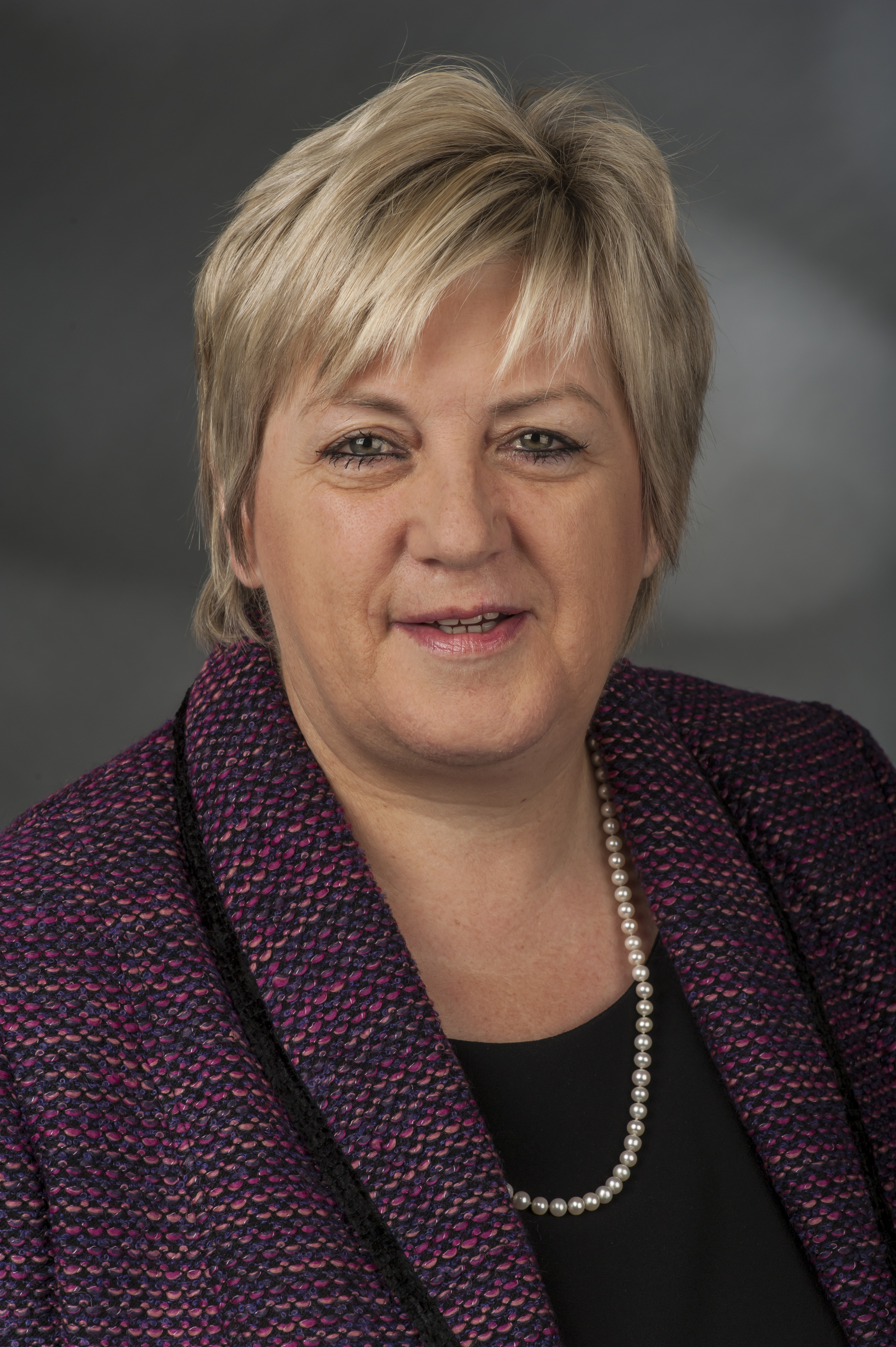
- Kovac in 2014

Member of the Bundestag; from Baden-Württemberg
- In office 17 March 2021 – 26 October 2021
- Preceded by: Nikolas Löbel
- Succeeded by: Isabel Cademartori
- Constituency: Mannheim
- In office 22 October 2013 – 24 October 2017
- Constituency: State list

Personal details
- Born: 22 October 1957 (age 68) Kirchhundem, West Germany
- Party: Christian Democratic Union
- Children: 2
- Website: www.kordulakovac.de

Kordula Kovac (born 22 October 1957) is a German politician of the CDU who has been serving as a member of the Bundestag for the state of Baden-Württemberg from 2013 to 2017 and again from March to October 2021.

== Political career ==
Kovac became a member of the Bundestag in 2021 when she replaced Nikolas Löbel who had resigned. In parliament, she has since been serving on the Defence Committee.
