= Egon Jüttner =

German politician

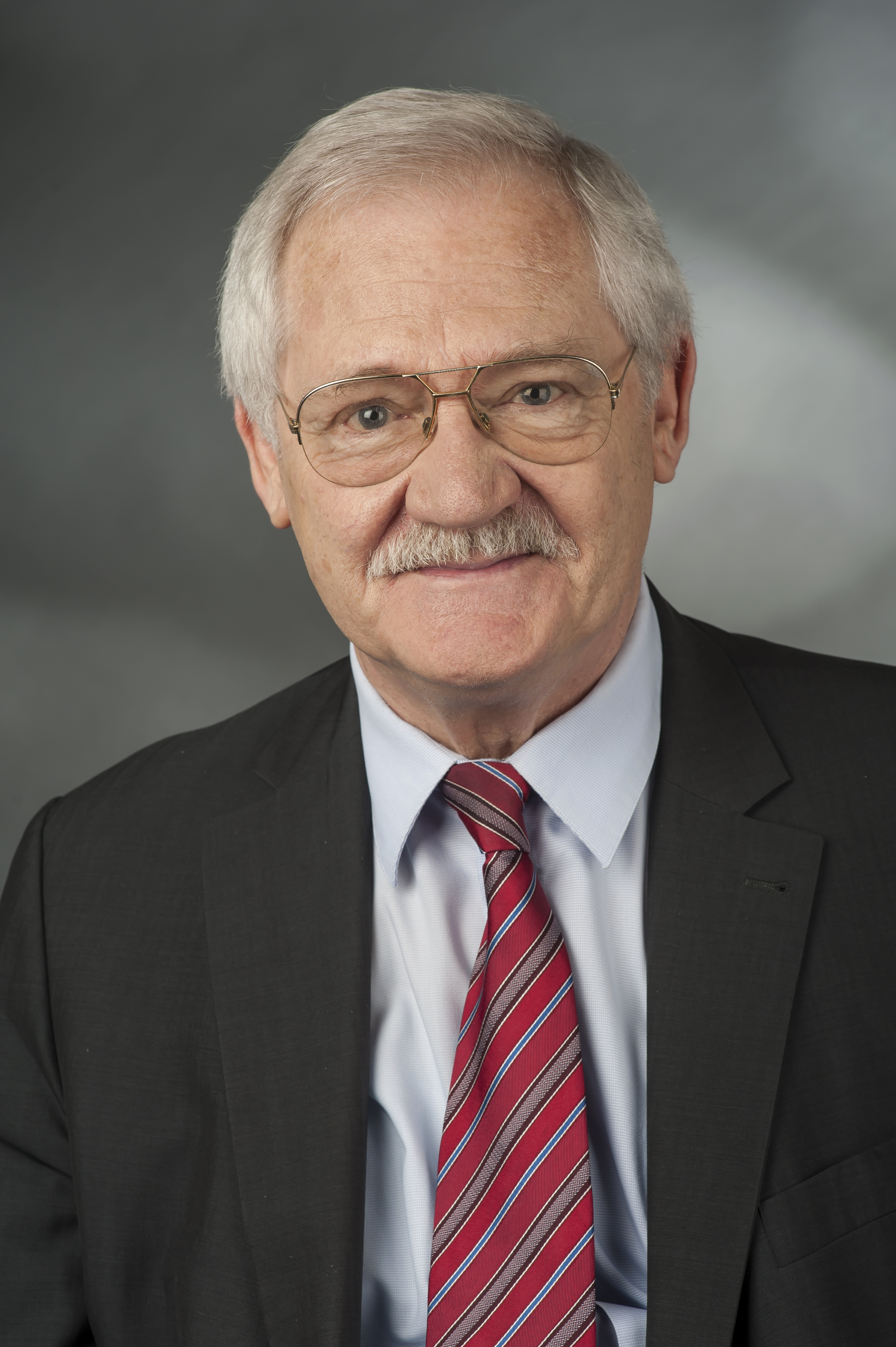
- Jüttner in 2014

Member of the Bundestag; from Baden-Württemberg
- In office 27 October 2009 – 24 October 2017
- Preceded by: Lothar Mark
- Succeeded by: Nikolas Löbel
- Constituency: Mannheim
- In office 6 August 2002 – 18 October 2005
- Preceded by: Dietmar Schlee
- Succeeded by: Multi-member district
- Constituency: Zollernalb – Sigmaringen (2002); State list (2002–2005)
- In office 20 December 1990 – 26 October 1998
- Preceded by: Multi-member district
- Succeeded by: Lothar Mark
- Constituency: State list (1990–1994); Mannheim I (1994–1998)

Personal details
- Born: 20 May 1942 (age 84) Gurschdorf, Sudetenland
- Party: Christian Democratic Union
- Children: 2
- Education: Saarland University; Free University of Berlin

Egon Jüttner (born 20 May 1942) is a German educationalist and social scientist, university lecturer and former politician (CDU). He was a member of the German Bundestag for almost 20 years in total and worked in the Mannheim city council for roughly 40 years.

== Life, education and career ==
Jüttner was born in Gurschdorf in the Sudetenland (now Skorošice in the Czech Republic). After being expelled, he attended primary school in Sulzdorf an der Lederhecke in Lower Franconia from 1948 to 1952. Jüttner graduated from high school in Bad Königshofen in 1961 and then studied English, Romance languages and literature, phonetics and education at Saarland University in Saarbrücken and the Free University of Berlin. In 1964, he passed the interpreting exam for Swedish. From 1964 to 1965, he was a lecturer in Swedish at the Institute of German Studies at Saarbrücken University. From 1965 to 1968, he was a research fellow at the Max Planck Institute for Educational Research in Berlin and a consultant for Sweden. Jüttner gained his doctorate in 1969 with his thesis "Der Kampf um die schwedische Schulreform" (The Struggle for Swedish School Reform) before working as a lecturer, research assistant, academic counsellor and senior academic counsellor at various universities in Heidelberg, Mainz, Worms and Mannheim from 1969 to 1976. From 1976 to 2007, Jüttner was a professor at the University of the Bundeswehr Munich in the Department of Pedagogical Propaedeutics.

=== Private life ===
He is Catholic and was married to Ursula, née Keller, until her death in 2022. They have two children and three grandchildren and lived in the Sandhofen district of Mannheim. He counts gardening among his hobbies.

== Political work ==
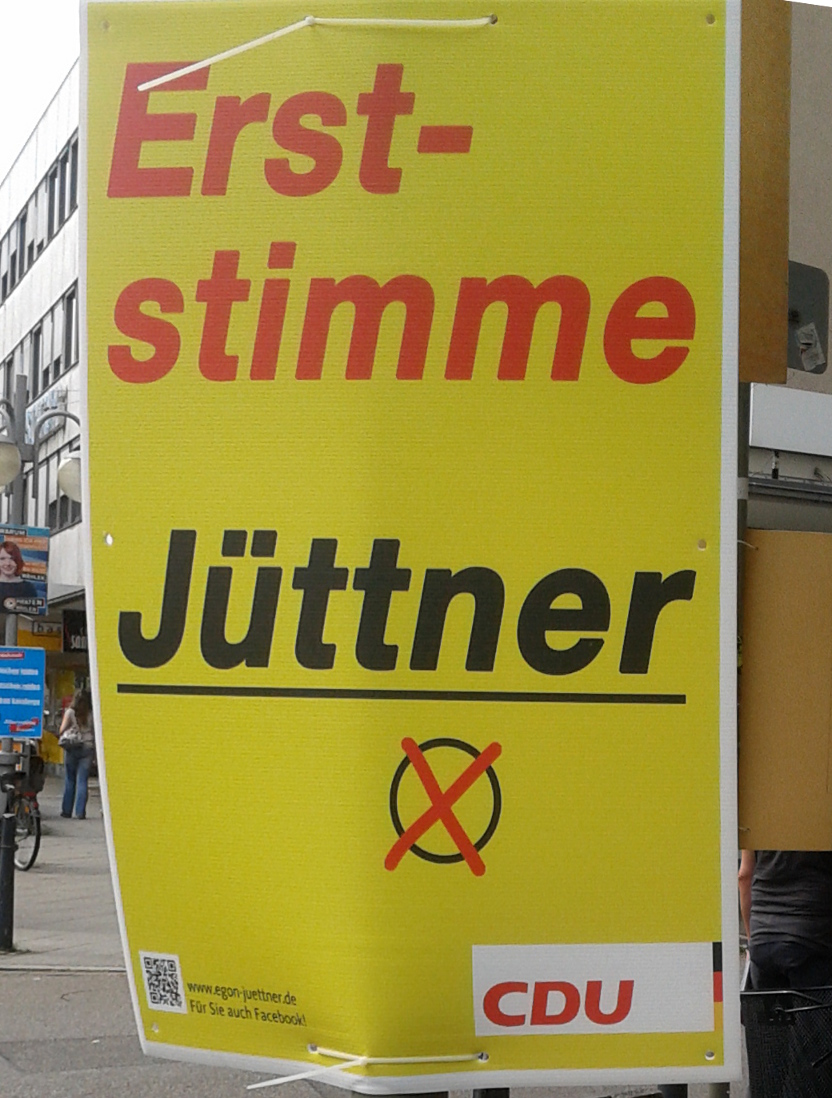
An election poster for Jüttner for the 2013 General Election

As a student, Jüttner was still on the left according to his own statements, but soon found Willy Brandt's Ostpolitik difficult to accept. Jüttner joined the CDU in 1972 and became a district councillor in Sandhofen in 1980. In 1984, he was elected to Mannheim's municipal council for the first time and served on it several times, with interruptions. He was a member of the German Bundestag from 1990 through 1994 to 1998. After narrowly missing re-entry in 1998, he replaced the deceased Dietmar Schlee towards the end of the 14th parliamentary term on 6 August 2002 and was then a member of the Bundestag until the 2005 parliamentary elections. He was re-elected to the German Bundestag in the 2009 general election and again in 2013, winning the direct mandate in the Mannheim constituency in the 1994, 2009 and 2013 elections. He was most recently a member of the Committee on Foreign Affairs and the Committee on Human Rights and Humanitarian Aid and Deputy Chairman of the Subcommittee on United Nations, Internationalisation and Globalisation. Jüttner was a member of the OSCE Parliamentary Assembly and the Europa-Union Parliamentary Group of the German Bundestag.

In spring 2016, Jüttner announced that he would not be standing for election to the 19th Bundestag in autumn 2017. His successor in the constituency was Nikolas Löbel, with whom Jüttner had a rather distant relationship.

From 1995 to 2002, Jüttner was chairman of the Mannheim CDU district association and has been honorary chairman since 2002. In May 2021, it became known that the district executive had reprimanded its honorary chairman Jüttner for passing on internal information and had asked him to hand back the honorary chairman title. However, Jüttner did not comply with this request. The case is currently (As of 2021) before the district party court of the Nordbaden district association in Mosbach, and Jüttner is being represented by Sven-Joachim Otto as a lawyer in the proceedings. In November 2023, Jüttner - against his own wishes - was no longer included by the CDU on the list of candidates for the 2024 local elections. In spring 2024, Jüttner announced that he would be standing for the rival Mittelstand für Mannheim (MfM) voters' association in the local elections on 9 June 2024. There, he achieved the best result of the list of all time and was elected as an individual city councillor. In November 2024, Jüttner withdrew from the municipal council for health reasons - without having attended a single meeting of the newly elected municipal council and under threat of forfeiting his expense allowance.

== Other activities ==
Jüttner was a member of the advisory board and Vice President of the German-Arab Society from 2004 to 2008, he was a founding member and President of the German-Japanese Society Rhine-Neckar from 1979 to 1996. From 1975 to 2016, he was chairman of the non-profit citizens' association Mannheim-Sandhofen e. V. and a member of the Sudeten German Council since 1998.

In 2013, he accompanied Eduard Lintner, who was heavily criticised in the context of the "Azerbaijani laundromat" affair, on a controversial trip to Azerbaijan.

== Publications ==
- Entwicklungen im schwedischen Bildungswesen 1967/68, Egon Jüttner, Bildung und Erziehung, 21. Jg., Heft 4,Juli/August 1968
- The struggle for Swedish school reform. Egon Jüttner, Berlin, self-published dissertation, 1970
- Sweden. Facts, analyses, trends in the education system, Egon Jüttner, Munich, Ehrenwirth, 1970
- School reform and society in Sweden 1940-1970, Egon Jüttner and Detlef Glowka, Klett, 1975
- Developments in the Swedish education system 1967/68, Egon Jüttner, in the journal 'Bildung und Erziehung', 21st annual issue, No. 4, July/August 1968
