= Nikolas Löbel =

German politician (born 1986)

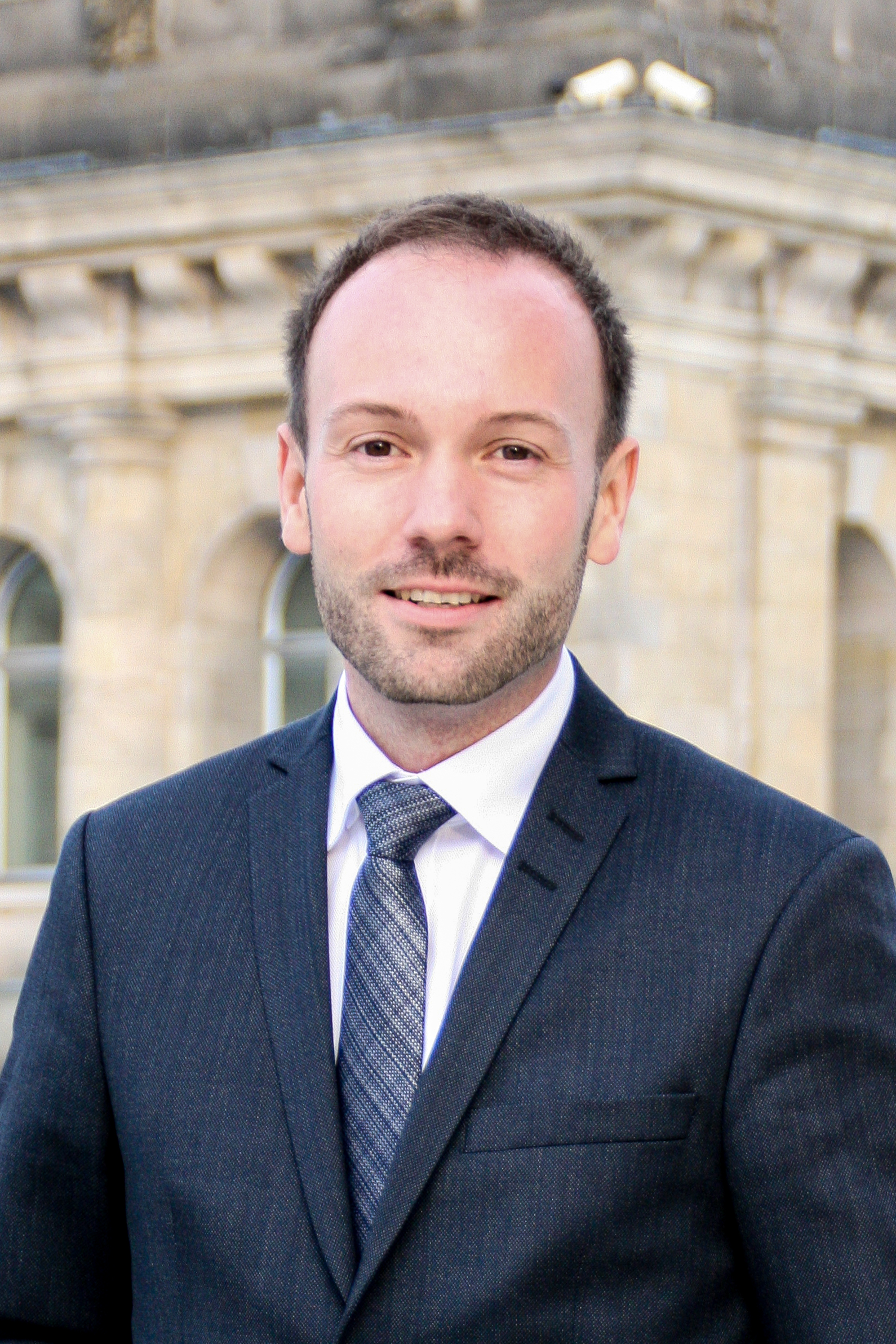
- Löbel in 2018

Member of the Bundestag; for Mannheim
- In office 24 October 2017 – 10 March 2021
- Preceded by: Egon Jüttner
- Succeeded by: Kordula Kovac

Personal details
- Born: 17 May 1986 (age 40) Mannheim, West Germany
- Party: Christian Democratic Union
- Education: Steinbeis-Hochschule Berlin

Nikolas Löbel (born 17 May 1986) is a German politician of the Christian Democratic Union (CDU) who served as a member of the Bundestag from the state of Baden-Württemberg from 2017 to 2021. He resigned in March 2021.

== Political career ==
In 2012, Löbel was a CDU delegate to the Federal Convention for the purpose of electing the President of Germany.

Löbel became a member of the Bundestag after the 2017 German federal election, representing the Mannheim district. In parliament, he served on the Committee on Foreign Affairs and the Subcommittee on Disarmament, Arms Control and Non-Proliferation. In this capacity, he was his parliamentary group's rapporteur on the European Union's Eastern Partnership.

In March 2021, Der Spiegel revealed that a company Löbel owned had earned a €250,000 commission by acting as a middleman between a mask supplier in Baden-Württemberg and two private, China related companies in the state amid the COVID-19 pandemic in Germany. Facing public pressure, he subsequently resigned from his parliamentary seat and announced that he was retiring from politics.

== Other activities ==
- Sparkasse Rhein Neckar Nord, Member of the supervisory board (2017 to 2021)

== Political positions ==
Following the 2016 Baden-Württemberg state election, Löbel supported the formation of a coalition government of the Green Party and the Christian Democrats under Minister-President Winfried Kretschmann, the first state-level government of the two parties to be headed by a member of the Green Party in German history.

Ahead of the Christian Democrats' leadership election in 2021, Löbel publicly endorsed Jens Spahn to succeed Annegret Kramp-Karrenbauer as the party's chair.

== Controversies ==
=== Lobbying for Azerbaijan ===
As chairman of the Baden-Württemberg Young Union, Nikolas Löbel came under criticism from both the CDU and Amnesty International, for a planned sponsorship of 2,000 euros by a student network from Azerbaijan at the state parliament of the Baden-Württembe Young Union in 2012, since the student network in question was funded by Azerbaijani state-owned oil and gas company SOCAR and other Azerbaijani companies with ties to its autocratic leader - Ilham Aliyev, who's been criticized for continued and serious violations of human rights. As a result, the sponsorship fell through.

In March 2021 several Bundestag members of the ruling Union coalition became subjects of criminal investigations on the initial suspicion of corruption, for receiving payments from the Azerbaijani Laundromat money laundering scheme, while others were implicated in allegations of corrupt lobbying practices known as "Caviar diplomacy" in the European Council or what became known as the "Azerbaijan affair" (German: Aserbaidschan-Affäre) in Germany.

In this context Löbel's strong advocacy for Azerbaijani interests during the 2020 Nagorno-Karabakh war between Azerbaijan and Armenia raised some eyebrows as Löbel took a one-sided stance backing the position of Azerbaijan in the conflict. He also dismissed criticism of human rights violations in Azerbaijan, stating that it is "not to be compared with a democracy based on the Western model", but "an important strategic partner" for Germany as a natural gas supplier and possible importer of "German products and goods".

=== "Mask affair" scandal and resignation ===
In April 2020, Löbel brokered contracts for protective mask deliveries from China to Germany by Bricon Technology GmbH. According to his own statements, he received a commission of 250,000 euros for this deal. Löbel described this as being in line with the market, but admitted that he lacked sensitivity.

This information became known in the context of a series of articles published by German press in March 2021, revealing how several Bundestag members from the leading Union coalition had brokered deals for PPE with lucrative commissions for themselves, which led to intense criticism from members of all parties in the Bundestag, including the CSU/CDU Union and led to what became known as the so-called "Mask Affair" (German: Maskenaffäre) scandal in Germany.

The first article about Löbel having asked for a commission was published in Der Spiegel on 5 March 2021. On the same day he stepped down from the Foreign Affairs Committee of the Bundestag. On 7 March 2021, in response to the "Mask Affair", he announced that he would resign from his Bundestag mandate as well as his membership of the municipal council in Mannheim on 31 August 2021 and not run again for the Bundestag and he would also end his membership in the CDU / CSU parliamentary group with immediate effect and give up the district chairmanship of the Mannheim CDU. He apologized for having "violated the obligations of his office with his conduct". A number of politicians from different parties criticized him for not giving up his mandate immediately, pointing out that, in addition to regular MP benefits and allowances, he thus keeps his entitlement to an additional year of retirement allowances (German: Altersentschädig) for MPs, noted the independent organization Abanderswatch.de, citing the MPs Act. The CDU federal chairman Armin Laschet criticized his "greed mentality" and distanced himself from MPs who "had nothing on their minds but to earn money."

On 8 March 2021, in response to political and media pressure, Löbel announced that he was giving up his parliamentary mandate with immediate effect in order to avoid "further damage to his party" shortly before two state elections were about to take place in Baden-Württemberg and Rhineland-Palatinate". He left the Bundestag two days later. The CDU district association Mannheim also announced on March 8 that Löbel had resigned from the CDU "with immediate effect". At the end of March 2021, the Stuttgart Public Prosecutor's Office announced that after examining the allegation of "bribery of elected officials" in connection with the mediation of mask business, "due to a lack of initial suspicion, it would refrain from initiating investigative proceedings"; In their opinion, there is "in the present case no direct connection between the private activity and the activity as a member of the Bundestag."
