= Petrovce =

Petrovce may refer to several villages in Slovakia:

- Petrovce (Rimavská Sobota District) - a municipality in the Rimavská Sobota District of southern Slovakia
- Petrovce (Sobrance District) - a municipality in the Sobrance District of eastern Slovakia
- Petrovce (Vranov nad Topľou District) - a municipality in the Vranov nad Topľou District of eastern Slovakia
- Petrovce nad Laborcom - a municipality in the Michalovce District of eastern Slovakia
- Granč-Petrovce - a municipality in the Levoča District of eastern Slovakia
