= Mannheim (electoral district) =

Federal electoral district of Germany

275 Mannheim
- Electoral district for the Bundestag
- Mannheim in 2025
- State: Baden-Württemberg
- Population: 310,700 (2019)
- Electorate: 195,336 (2025)
- Major settlements: Mannheim
- Area: 145.0 km^{2}

Current electoral district
- Created: 1949
- Member: Vacant
- Elected: 2025

Mannheim is an electoral constituency (German: Wahlkreis) represented in the Bundestag. It elects one member via first-past-the-post voting. Under the current constituency numbering system, it is designated as constituency 275. It is located in northwestern Baden-Württemberg, comprising the city of Mannheim.

Mannheim was created for the inaugural 1949 federal election. Whilst the Christian Democratic Union won a plurality in the 2025 election, under the new voting system, their candidate did not actually win a seat in the Bundestag. This was due to the distribution of seats won by the CDU being decided by the first (direct) vote percentage of each winning CDU candidate, determining who took the seats. As the CDU candidate got a low vote of 24.7%, the seat will remain vacant throughout the 21st Bundestag.

== Geography ==
Mannheim is located in northwestern Baden-Württemberg. As of the 2021 federal election, it is coterminous with the independent city of Mannheim.

== History ==
Mannheim was created in 1949, then known as Mannheim-Stadt. In the 1965 through 1998 elections, it was named Mannheim I. It acquired its current name in the 2002 election. In the 1949 election, it was Württemberg-Baden Landesbezirk Baden constituency 2 in the number system. In the 1953 through 1961 elections, it was number 176. In the 1965 through 1998 elections, it was number 179. In the 2002 and 2005 elections, it was number 276. Since the 2009 election, it has been number 275.

Originally, the constituency was coterminous with the independent city of Mannheim. In the 1965 through 1972 elections, it comprised the Stadtbezirke of Innenstadt/Jungbusch, Neckarstadt-West, Neckarstadt-Ost/Wohlgelegen, Sandhofen, Schönau, Waldhof, Käfertal, Vogelstang, and Schwetzingerstadt/Oststadt from the city of Mannheim. In the 1976 election, it gained the Stadtbezirke of Feudenheim and Wallstadt. Since the 2002 election, it has again been coterminous with the city of Mannheim.

Election	No.	Name	Borders
1949	2	Mannheim-Stadt	Mannheim city
1953	177	Mannheim-Stadt	Mannheim city
1957	177	Mannheim-Stadt	Mannheim city
1961	177	Mannheim-Stadt	Mannheim city
1965	179	Mannheim I	Mannheim city (only Innenstadt/Jungbusch, Käfertal, Neckarstadt-Ost/Wohlgelegen, Neckarstadt-West, Sandhofen, Schönau, Schwetzingerstadt/Oststadt, Vogelstang, and Waldhof Stadtbezirke)
1969	179	Mannheim I	Mannheim city (only Innenstadt/Jungbusch, Käfertal, Neckarstadt-Ost/Wohlgelegen, Neckarstadt-West, Sandhofen, Schönau, Schwetzingerstadt/Oststadt, Vogelstang, and Waldhof Stadtbezirke)
1972	179	Mannheim I	Mannheim city (only Innenstadt/Jungbusch, Käfertal, Neckarstadt-Ost/Wohlgelegen, Neckarstadt-West, Sandhofen, Schönau, Schwetzingerstadt/Oststadt, Vogelstang, and Waldhof Stadtbezirke)
1976	179	Mannheim I	Mannheim city (only Feudenheim, Innenstadt/Jungbusch, Käfertal, Neckarstadt-Ost/Wohlgelegen, Neckarstadt-West, Sandhofen, Schönau, Schwetzingerstadt/Oststadt, Vogelstang, Waldhof, and Wallstadt Stadtbezirke)
1980	179	Mannheim I	Mannheim city (only Feudenheim, Innenstadt/Jungbusch, Käfertal, Neckarstadt-Ost/Wohlgelegen, Neckarstadt-West, Sandhofen, Schönau, Schwetzingerstadt/Oststadt, Vogelstang, Waldhof, and Wallstadt Stadtbezirke)
1983	179	Mannheim I	Mannheim city (only Feudenheim, Innenstadt/Jungbusch, Käfertal, Neckarstadt-Ost/Wohlgelegen, Neckarstadt-West, Sandhofen, Schönau, Schwetzingerstadt/Oststadt, Vogelstang, Waldhof, and Wallstadt Stadtbezirke)
1987	179	Mannheim I	Mannheim city (only Feudenheim, Innenstadt/Jungbusch, Käfertal, Neckarstadt-Ost/Wohlgelegen, Neckarstadt-West, Sandhofen, Schönau, Schwetzingerstadt/Oststadt, Vogelstang, Waldhof, and Wallstadt Stadtbezirke)
1990	179	Mannheim I	Mannheim city (only Feudenheim, Innenstadt/Jungbusch, Käfertal, Neckarstadt-Ost/Wohlgelegen, Neckarstadt-West, Sandhofen, Schönau, Schwetzingerstadt/Oststadt, Vogelstang, Waldhof, and Wallstadt Stadtbezirke)
1994	179	Mannheim I	Mannheim city (only Feudenheim, Innenstadt/Jungbusch, Käfertal, Neckarstadt-Ost/Wohlgelegen, Neckarstadt-West, Sandhofen, Schönau, Schwetzingerstadt/Oststadt, Vogelstang, Waldhof, and Wallstadt Stadtbezirke)
1998	179	Mannheim I	Mannheim city (only Feudenheim, Innenstadt/Jungbusch, Käfertal, Neckarstadt-Ost/Wohlgelegen, Neckarstadt-West, Sandhofen, Schönau, Schwetzingerstadt/Oststadt, Vogelstang, Waldhof, and Wallstadt Stadtbezirke)
2002	276	Mannheim	Mannheim city
2005	276	Mannheim	Mannheim city
2009	275	Mannheim	Mannheim city
2013	275	Mannheim	Mannheim city
2017	275	Mannheim	Mannheim city
2021	275	Mannheim	Mannheim city
2025	275	Mannheim	Mannheim city

== Members ==
The constituency has been held by the Social Democratic Party (SPD) during all but four Bundestag terms since its creation. It was first represented by Carlo Schmid from 1949 to 1972, followed by Werner Nagel from 1972 to 1990. Siegfried Vergin then served one term. Egon Jüttner of the Christian Democratic Union (CDU) was elected in 1994, but Lothar Mark regained the constituency for the SPD in 1998, and served until 2009. Former member Jüttner was elected again in 2009, and served until 2017. Nikolas Löbel of the CDU was elected in 2017. Isabel Cademartori won the constituency for the SPD in 2021. The seat has been vacant since the 2025 election.

Election	Member	Party	%
1949	Carlo Schmid	SPD	38.3
1953	Carlo Schmid	SPD	38.1
1957	Carlo Schmid	SPD	44.7
1961	Carlo Schmid	SPD	44.4
1965	Carlo Schmid	SPD	52.8
1969	Carlo Schmid	SPD	55.9
1972	Werner Nagel	SPD	59.3
1976	Werner Nagel	SPD	53.6
1980	Werner Nagel	SPD	55.3
1983	Werner Nagel	SPD	49.0
1987	Werner Nagel	SPD	46.8
1990	Siegfried Vergin	SPD	40.8
1994	Egon Jüttner	CDU	42.5
1998	Lothar Mark	SPD	48.9
2002	Lothar Mark	SPD	48.5
2005	Lothar Mark	SPD	45.9
2009	Egon Jüttner	CDU	36.5
2013	Egon Jüttner	CDU	39.8
2017	Nikolas Löbel	CDU	29.3
2021	Isabel Cademartori	SPD	26.4
2025	Vacant (Note: Melis Sekmen (CDU) won with 24.7% but seat remained vacant due to insufficient second votes cover.)		

== Election results ==
=== 2025 election ===
Under the new voting system implemented for the 2025 election, although the CDU candidate won the most votes in this constituency, due to the low winning percentage, the constituency seat will remain vacant as not enough second (party) votes were won to be allocated this seat.

Federal election (2025): Mannheim
Notes:	Blue background denotes the winner of the electorate vote. Pink background denotes a candidate elected from their party list. Yellow background denotes an electorate win by a list member, or other incumbent. A ✓ or ✗ denotes status of any incumbent, win or lose respectively.						
Party	Candidate	Votes	%	±%	Party votes	%	±%
CDU	Melis Sekmen	37,564	24.7	▲4.8	35,226	23.1	▲4.9
SPD	✗ Isabel Cademartori	34,133	22.5	▼3.9	27,685	18.2	▼7.1
Greens	Nina Uschi Elke Wellenreuther	27,491	18.1	▼4.4	24,375	16.0	▼5.1
AfD	Heinrich Friedrich Koch	27,165	17.9	▲8.1	26,730	17.6	▲8.4
Left	Gökay Akbulut	12,114	8.0	▲3.1	17,209	11.3	▲6.3
FDP	Konrad Johann Lorenz Stockmeier	6,389	4.2	▼6.4	7,836	5.1	▼8.0
BSW					7,128	4.7	
APT	Dr. Lucia Lou-Anne Boileau	2,759	1.8		1,754	1.2	▼0.4
Volt					1,485	1.0	▲0.4
FW	Andre Kühner	2,626	1.7	▼0.5	1,127	0.7	▼0.6
PARTEI	Félix Hugo Francisco Gimenez	1,441	0.9	▼0.4	824	0.5	▼0.5
dieBasis					322	0.2	▼1.1
Bündnis C					169	0.1	Steady
ÖDP					167	0.1	▼0.1
BD					144	0.1	
MLPD	Josef Eugen Buck	221	0.1	Steady	82	0.1	Steady
Informal votes		1,234			874		
Total valid votes		151,903			152,263		
Turnout		153,137	78.4	▲6.2			
Vacant gain from SPD	Majority						

=== 2021 election ===
Federal election (2021): Mannheim
Notes:	Blue background denotes the winner of the electorate vote. Pink background denotes a candidate elected from their party list. Yellow background denotes an electorate win by a list member, or other incumbent. A ✓ or ✗ denotes status of any incumbent, win or lose respectively.						
Party	Candidate	Votes	%	±%	Party votes	%	±%
SPD	Isabel Cademartori	37,102	26.4	▼1.6	35,651	25.3	▲4.1
Greens	Melis Sekmen	31,723	22.5	▲9.4	29,814	21.1	▲8.0
CDU	Roland Hörner	27,986	19.9	▼9.4	25,682	18.2	▼8.9
FDP	Konrad Stockmeier	14,879	10.6	▲3.7	18,515	13.1	▲1.9
AfD	Jörg Finkler	13,773	9.8	▼2.7	12,846	9.1	▼3.7
Left	Gökay Akbulut	6,811	4.8	▼2.5	7,066	5.0	▼4.1
Tierschutzpartei					2,178	1.5	▲0.5
FW	Stephan Frauenkron	3,205	2.3	▲1.3	1,871	1.3	▲0.7
dieBasis	Lars Ebert	2,276	1.6		1,845	1.3	
PARTEI	Simon Matheis	1,933	1.4	▼0.3	1,471	1.0	▼0.2
Team Todenhöfer					1,212	0.9	
Volt					844	0.6	
Pirates					529	0.4	▼0.1
ÖDP	Joachim Förster	500	0.4		241	0.2	0.0
KlimalisteBW	Johanna Legnar	410	0.3				
Gesundheitsforschung					216	0.2	
Humanists					200	0.1	
NPD					146	0.1	▼0.2
DiB					146	0.1	▼0.1
Bündnis C					146	0.1	
Bürgerbewegung					136	0.1	
MLPD	Josef Buck	184	0.1	▼0.1	81	0.1	▼0.1
DKP					58	0.0	0.0
Bündnis 21					50	0.0	
LKR					23	0.0	
Informal votes		1,350			1,165		
Total valid votes		140,782			140,967		
Turnout		142,132	72.2	▼0.8			
SPD gain from CDU	Majority	5,379	3.9				

=== 2017 election ===
Federal election (2017): Mannheim
Notes:	Blue background denotes the winner of the electorate vote. Pink background denotes a candidate elected from their party list. Yellow background denotes an electorate win by a list member, or other incumbent. A ✓ or ✗ denotes status of any incumbent, win or lose respectively.						
Party	Candidate	Votes	%	±%	Party votes	%	±%
CDU	Nikolas Löbel	41,812	29.3	▼10.5	38,746	27.1	▼7.9
SPD	Stefan Rebmann	39,795	27.9	▼4.4	30,309	21.2	▼6.3
Greens	Gerhard Schick	18,739	13.1	▲0.9	18,803	13.2	▲2.1
AfD	Robert Schmidt	17,833	12.5		18,309	12.8	▲6.8
Left	Gökay Akbulut	10,493	7.4	▲0.7	12,989	9.1	▲1.6
FDP	Florian Kußmann	9,835	6.9	▲4.1	16,050	11.2	▲5.8
PARTEI	Patrick H.P. Siegert	2,337	1.6	▲0.9	1,807	1.3	
Tierschutzpartei					1,552	1.1	▲0.1
FW	Martin Marino-Haffner	1,444	1.0		826	0.6	▲0.2
Pirates					689	0.5	▼2.7
Tierschutzallianz					414	0.3	
BGE					395	0.3	
NPD					381	0.3	▼0.9
DiB					311	0.2	
V-Partei³					246	0.2	
DM					240	0.2	
ÖDP					231	0.2	0.0
Menschliche Welt					186	0.1	
MLPD	Josef Buck	286	0.2	0.0	160	0.1	0.0
DKP					46	0.0	
DIE RECHTE					33	0.0	
Informal votes		1,504			1,355		
Total valid votes		142,574			142,723		
Turnout		144,078	73.0	▲3.6			
CDU hold	Majority	2,017	1.4	▼6.0			

=== 2013 election ===
Federal election (2013): Mannheim
Notes:	Blue background denotes the winner of the electorate vote. Pink background denotes a candidate elected from their party list. Yellow background denotes an electorate win by a list member, or other incumbent. A ✓ or ✗ denotes status of any incumbent, win or lose respectively.						
Party	Candidate	Votes	%	±%	Party votes	%	±%
CDU	✓ Egon Jüttner	53,819	39.8	▲3.3	47,598	35.1	▲6.0
SPD	Stefan Rebmann	43,736	32.4	▲2.2	37,367	27.5	▲2.9
Greens	Gerhard Schick	16,544	12.2	▼0.4	15,047	11.1	▼2.6
Left	Michael Schlecht	8,951	6.6	▼2.9	10,227	7.5	▼3.8
AfD					8,148	6.0	
Pirates	Stefan Täge	4,606	3.4		4,287	3.2	▲0.7
FDP	Birgit Reinemund	3,772	2.8	▼6.1	7,427	5.5	▼9.6
NPD	Silvio Waldheim	2,514	1.9	0.0	1,585	1.2	▼0.2
Tierschutzpartei					1,378	1.0	▲0.2
PARTEI	Peter Mendelsohn	955	0.7				
REP					514	0.4	▼0.4
RENTNER					497	0.4	
FW					465	0.3	
ÖDP					278	0.2	0.0
Volksabstimmung					277	0.2	0.0
PBC					162	0.1	▼0.1
PRO					136	0.1	
MLPD	Josef Buck	270	0.2	▼0.1	120	0.1	0.0
BIG					104	0.1	
Party of Reason					100	0.1	
BüSo					27	0.0	0.0
Informal votes		2,629			2,052		
Total valid votes		135,167			135,744		
Turnout		137,796	69.4	▲1.8			
CDU hold	Majority	10,083	7.4	▲1.1			

=== 2009 election ===
Federal election (2009): Mannheim
Notes:	Blue background denotes the winner of the electorate vote. Pink background denotes a candidate elected from their party list. Yellow background denotes an electorate win by a list member, or other incumbent. A ✓ or ✗ denotes status of any incumbent, win or lose respectively.						
Party	Candidate	Votes	%	±%	Party votes	%	±%
CDU	Egon Jüttner	48,137	36.5	▼0.9	38,435	29.0	▼2.0
SPD	Stefan Rebmann	39,845	30.2	▼15.7	32,627	24.7	▼12.5
Greens	Gerhard Schick	16,648	12.6	▲6.8	18,052	13.6	▲2.8
Left	Michael Schlecht	12,520	9.5	▲3.2	14,936	11.3	▲4.7
FDP	Birgit Reinemund	11,782	8.9	▲4.3	19,900	15.0	▲5.1
Pirates					3,258	2.5	
NPD	Silvio Waldheim	2,418	1.8		1,772	1.3	0.0
Tierschutzpartei					1,090	0.8	
REP					987	0.7	▼0.4
Independent	Sultan Ulusoy	311	0.2				
Volksabstimmung					286	0.2	
DIE VIOLETTEN					239	0.2	
PBC					238	0.2	▼0.1
ÖDP					236	0.2	
MLPD	Josef Buck	333	0.3		121	0.1	0.0
DVU					73	0.1	
BüSo					60	0.0	▼0.1
ADM					48	0.0	
Informal votes		2,149			1,785		
Total valid votes		131,994			132,358		
Turnout		134,143	67.6	▼6.1			
CDU gain from SPD	Majority	8,292	6.3				

=== 2005 election ===
Federal election (2005):Mannheim
Notes:	Blue background denotes the winner of the electorate vote. Pink background denotes a candidate elected from their party list. Yellow background denotes an electorate win by a list member, or other incumbent. A ✓ or ✗ denotes status of any incumbent, win or lose respectively.						
Party	Candidate	Votes	%	±%	Party votes	%	±%
SPD	✓ Mark Lothar	65,730	45.9	▼2.6	53,295	37.1	▼4.2
CDU	Egon Jüttner	53,513	37.4	▼1.2	44,641	31.1	▼3.3
Left	Anton Kobel	8,984	6.3	▲4.5	9,507	6.6	▲5.0
Greens	Gerhard Schick	8,293	5.8	▼0.6	15,587	10.9	▼1.1
FDP	Birgit Reinemund	6,579	4.6	▼0.2	14,283	9.9	▲2.8
NPD					1,875	1.3	▲1.0
REP					1,590	1.1	▲0.2
Familie					1,073	0.7	
GRAUEN					1,073	0.7	
PBC					391	0.3	
MLPD					177	0.1	
BüSo					147	0.1	▲0.1
Informal votes		3,187			2,693		
Total valid votes		143,099			143,593		
Turnout		146,286	73.7	▼2.3			
SPD hold	Majority	12,217	8.5				
