= Carlo Schmid (German politician) =

German academic and politician of the social-democratic SPD (1896–1979)

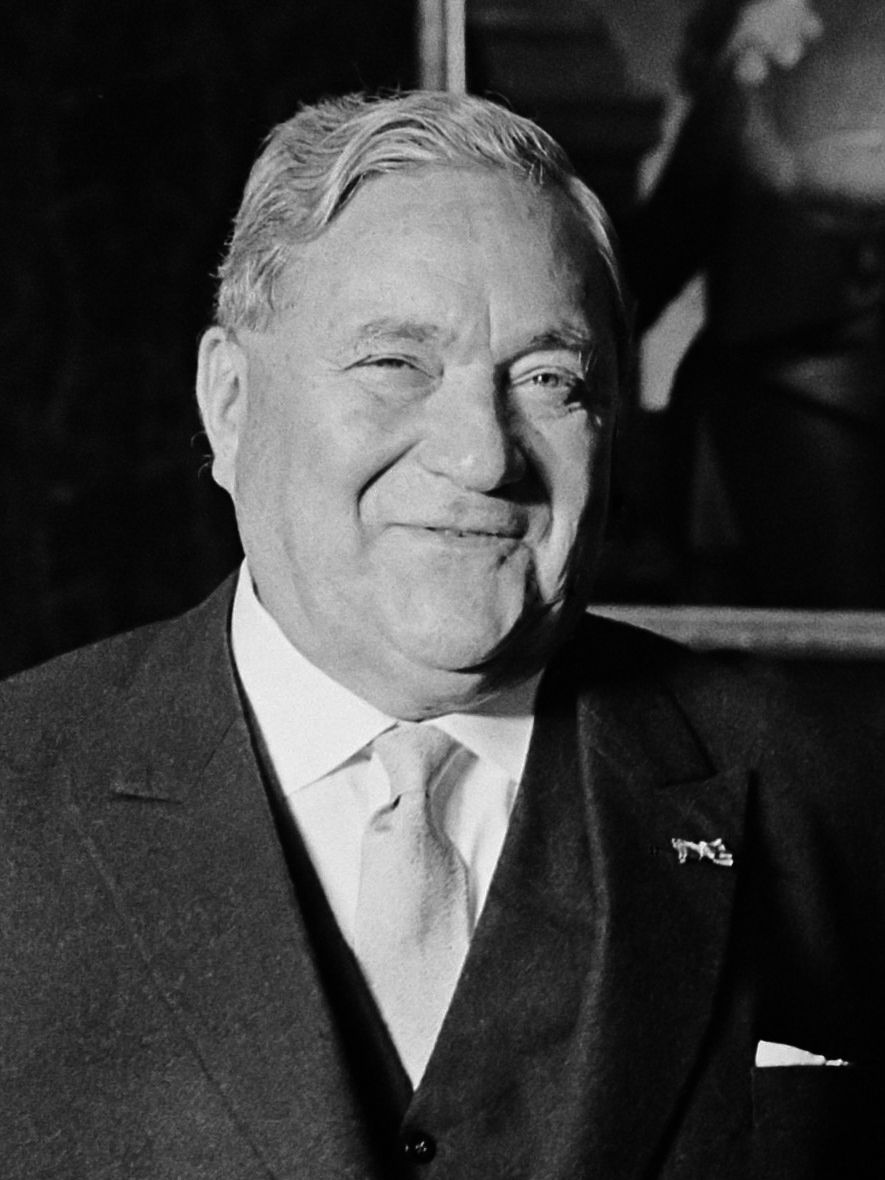
- Schmid in 1963

Minister for the Affairs of the Federal Council and States
- In office 1 December 1966 – 22 October 1969
- Chancellor: Kurt Georg Kiesinger
- Preceded by: Alois Niederalt
- Succeeded by: Office abolished

Member of the Bundestag
- In office 7 September 1949 – 13 December 1972
- Preceded by: Constituency established
- Succeeded by: Werner Nagel
- Constituency: Mannheim-Stadt (1949–1965); Mannheim I (1965–1972)

Minister-President of Württemberg-Hohenzollern
- Acting; 4 August 1948 – 13 August 1948
- Preceded by: Lorenz Bock
- Succeeded by: Gebhard Müller
- In office 16 October 1945 – 22 July 1947
- Preceded by: Office established
- Succeeded by: Lorenz Bock

Personal details
- Born: Charles Jean Martin Henri Schmid; 3 December 1896 Perpignan, France
- Died: 11 December 1979 (aged 83) Bad Honnef, West Germany
- Party: Social Democratic
- Spouse: Lydia Hermes (m. 1921)
- Children: 5
- Education: University of Tübingen
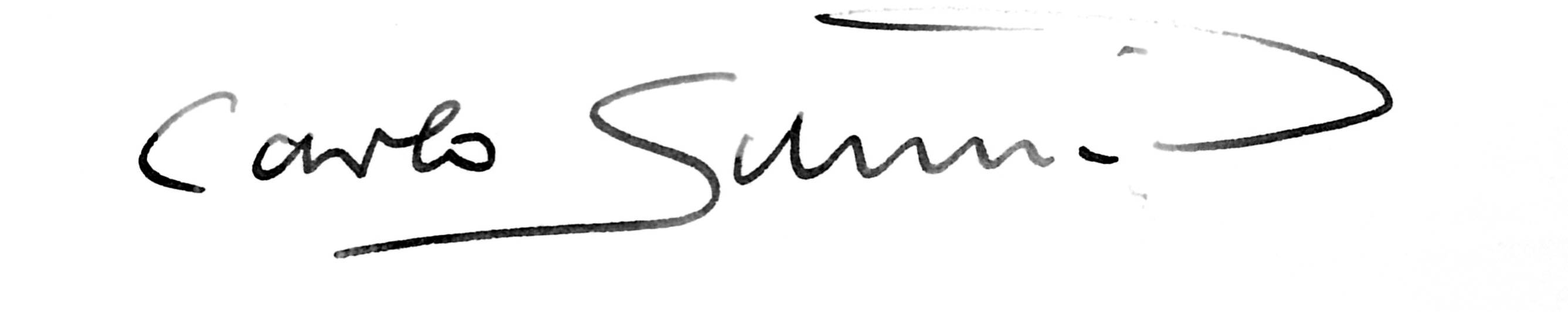
- Signature

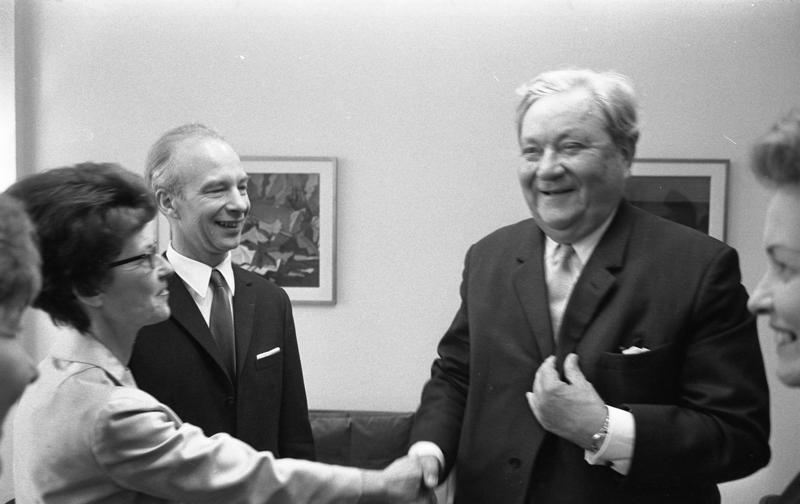
Carlo Schmid (right) in 1970

Carlo Schmid (3 December 1896 – 11 December 1979) was a German academic and politician of the Social Democratic Party of Germany (SPD).

Schmid is one of the most important authors of both the German Basic Law and the Godesberg Program of the SPD. He was intimately involved in German-French relations and served as "Federal Minister for the Affairs of the Federal Council and States" from 1966 to 1969.

== Biography and profession ==
Schmid was born in Perpignan, France, and lived there for five years before his family moved to Germany. In 1908, the family moved to Stuttgart, where Schmid attended the prestigious humanist Karls-Gymnasium, where he passed his Abitur in 1914. From 1914 to 1918, Schmid fought in the German army. After the war he studied law at the University of Tübingen after which he successfully sat the first (1921) and second (1924) Legal State Exam. In 1923, he completed a doctoral dissertation under the supervision of the renowned legal scholar Hugo Sinzheimer.

After working as a lawyer for a short time, he was made a justice of Württemberg state in 1927. From 1927 to 1928, he worked as a research assistant for the Kaiser-Wilhelm-Institut for foreign public law. At the Institute, he was a colleague of Hermann Heller. In 1929, Schmid completed his Habilitation with a thesis on the jurisprudence of the Permanent Court of International Justice. From 1930 to 1940 he worked as a Privatdozent at the University of Tübingen. He was refused tenure by the Nazis on political grounds.

In 1940 he was made legal counsel of the 'Oberfeldkommandantur' of the German occupation forces in Lille (France).

In 1946, he was granted tenure as professor of public law at Tübingen, and in 1953, he relinquished the position for a chair in Political Science at the Johann Wolfgang Goethe-Universität in Frankfurt am Main.

Apart from pursuing an academic career, Schmid translated works of Niccolò Machiavelli, Charles Baudelaire and André Malraux. His personal archive was placed in the care of the German Archive of Social Democracy in Bonn. He worried about Martin Sandberger's conditions in Landsberg prison and spoke out in favor of a commutation.

He was awarded the Grand Cross of the Order of Merit of the Federal Republic of Germany (Großkreuz des Verdienstordens der Bundesrepublik Deutschland). He was also awarded the prestigious Hanseatic Goethe Prize. Schmid died in Bad Honnef on 11 December 1979 at the age of 83.

== SPD ==
After the war, Schmid joined the SPD and was one of the founders of the reconstituted SPD in Württemberg. He acted as chairman of the SPD in Württemberg-Hohenzollern from 1946 to 1950 and was member of the SPD board from 1947 to 1970. He was also a member of the Presidium of the SPD from 1958 to 1970 and acted as a catalyst for party reform, being one of the main authors of the Godesberg Program, which jettisoned most remnants of Marxist doctrine.

From 1961 to 1965 he was part of Willy Brandt's shadow cabinet as shadow foreign minister.

== Parliamentary activity ==
In 1947, Schmid was elected as representative in the Landtag of Württemberg-Hohenzollern. He was a member of the Landtag until the state ceased to exist upon the creation of the state Baden-Württemberg on 17 May 1952.

From 1948 to 1949, Schmid was a member of the Parlamentarischer Rat, acting as leader of the SPD faction and chair of the Chief Committee, playing a pivotal role in the drawing up of the German Basic Law. Arguably, Schmid's most distinctive contribution to the German constitutional system was the "Constructive Vote of No Confidence" which stated that a Chancellor can be removed from office by only the Federal Diet upon the Diet's election of another Chancellor. This type of vote of no confidence is constructive because it prevents the Federal Government from being paralyzed by recurring votes of no confidence as occurred in the Weimar Republic.

From 1949 to 1972, he was a member of the Federal Diet. He was active in a variety of Diet committees, the most notable of which was the Foreign Affairs Committee. He also served as vice-president of the Federal Diet from 1949 to 1966 and again from 1969 to 1972. He also served as vice-president of the SPD-faction in the Diet. During his entire membership of the Diet he represented the Mannheim I electoral district.

== Other public offices ==
In 1945 the French military authorities nominated Schmid to act as "President of the State Secretariat" for the Land Württemberg-Hohenzollern, which was located in the French Zone of Occupation. Simultaneously, Schmid was put in charge of the Land's educational and cultural policies until the first elections took place in 1947. From then to 1 May 1950, Schmid was Minister of Justice and acting President of the Württemberg-Hohenzollern. He represented Württemberg-Hohenzollern at the German Constitutional Convention were the Basic Law was ratified.

Carlo Schmid stood for election for the office of Federal President (Bundespräsident) in 1959 but was defeated by the CDU candidate Heinrich Lübke in the second round of voting.

Schmid was Federal Minister for the Affairs of the Federal Council (Bundesrat) and States (Bundesländer) in the cabinet of Chancellor Kurt Georg Kiesinger from 1966 to 1969. In this position, he represented the Federal Government in the Bundesrat. Schmid quit the cabinet on 21 October 1969 after the election of 6th Bundestag.

== International politics ==
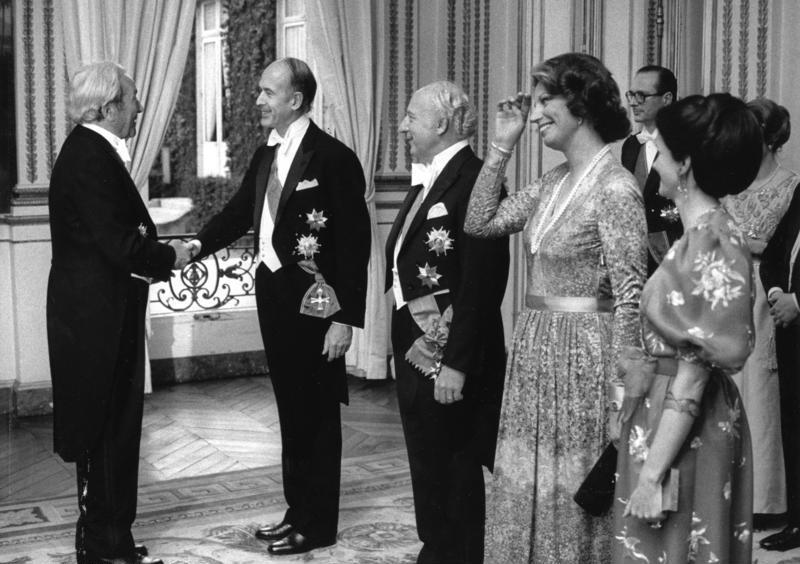
Schmid (left) at a reception of the French president in 1975

Carlo Schmid, whose mother was from France and who spoke excellent French, was always eager for reconciliation between France and Germany. He was a member of the Parliamentary Assembly of the Council of Europe from 1950 to 1960 as well as from 1969 to 1973. He was President of the Assembly of the Western European Union, a regional defence organisation distinct from the European Union, from 1963 to 1966, after being vice-president of the Assembly since 1956.

== Works ==
- "Regierung und Parlament", in: Hermann Wandersleb, Recht, Staat, Wirtschaft, vol. 3, Düsseldorf 1951.
- "Vier Jahre Erfahrungen mit dem Grundgesetz", in: Die Öffentliche Verwaltung, 1954, Issue 1, pp. 1–3.
- "Die Opposition als Staatseinrichtung", in: Der Wähler, 1955, Issue 11, pp. 498–506.
- "Der Abgeordnete zwischen Partei und Parlament", in: Die Neue Gesellschaft, 1959, Issue 6, pp. 439–444.
- "Der Deutsche Bundestag in der Verfassungswirklichkeit", in: Friedrich Schäfer, Finanzwissenschaft und Finanzpolitik, Festschrift für Erwin Schoettle, Tübingen 1964, pp. 269–284.
- (mit Horst Ehmke und Hans Scharoun), Festschrift für Adolf Arndt zum 65. Geburtstag, Frankfurt am Main 1969.
- "Der Deutsche Bundestag. Ein Essay", in: Der Deutsche Bundestag. Portrait eines Parlaments, Pfullingen 1974, pp. 12–17.
- "Das Fundament unserer staatlichen Ordnung", in: Bekenntnis zur Demokratie, Wiesbaden 1974, pp. 11–20.
- "Demokratie - Die Chance, den Staat zu verwirklichen", in: Forum Heute, Mannheim 1975, pp. 319–325.
- Erinnerungen (Reminiscences), Bern 1979.

== See also ==
- Hugo Preuß
- Jakob Maria Mierscheid, the fictitious follower
