= Przeciszów =

- Village
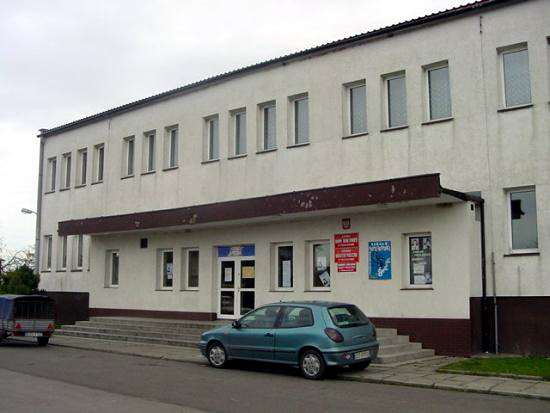

- Location within Poland
- Coordinates: 50°1′N 19°23′E
- Country: Poland
- Voivodeship: Lesser Poland
- County: Oświęcim
- Gmina: Przeciszów
- Population: 3,996

Przeciszów [pʂɛˈt͡ɕiʂuf] is a village in Oświęcim County, Lesser Poland Voivodeship, in southern Poland. It is the seat of the gmina (administrative district) called Gmina Przeciszów.
