= Podlesie, Oświęcim County =

Podlesie
- Settlement
- Location within Poland
- Coordinates: 50°01′10″N 19°22′26″E
- Country: Poland
- Voivodeship: Lesser Poland
- County: Oświęcim
- Gmina: Przeciszów

Podlesie [pɔdˈlɛɕɛ] is a settlement in the administrative district of Gmina Przeciszów, within Oświęcim County, Lesser Poland Voivodeship, in southern Poland.
