= Gmina Przeciszów =

Gmina Przeciszów Przeciszów Commune
- Gmina
- Coat of arms
- Interactive map of Gmina Przeciszów
- Coordinates (Przeciszów): 50°1′N 19°23′E
- Country: Poland
- Voivodeship: Lesser Poland
- County: Oświęcim
- Seat: Przeciszów

Area
  - Total: 35.4 km^{2} (13.7 sq mi)

Population (2006)
  - Total: 6,679
  - Density: 189/km^{2} (489/sq mi)
- Website: http://www.przeciszow.iap.pl

Gmina Przeciszów is a rural gmina (administrative district) in Oświęcim County, Lesser Poland Voivodeship, in southern Poland. Its seat is the village of Przeciszów, which lies approximately 12 kilometres (7 mi) east of Oświęcim and 40 km (25 mi) west of the regional capital Kraków.

The gmina covers an area of 35.4 square kilometres (13.7 sq mi), and as of 2006 its total population is 6,679.

== Villages ==
The gmina contains the villages of Piotrowice, Podlesie and Przeciszów.

== Neighbouring gminas ==
Gmina Przeciszów is bordered by the gminas of Babice, Oświęcim, Polanka Wielka, Wieprz and Zator.
