= Konrad Stockmeier =

German politician

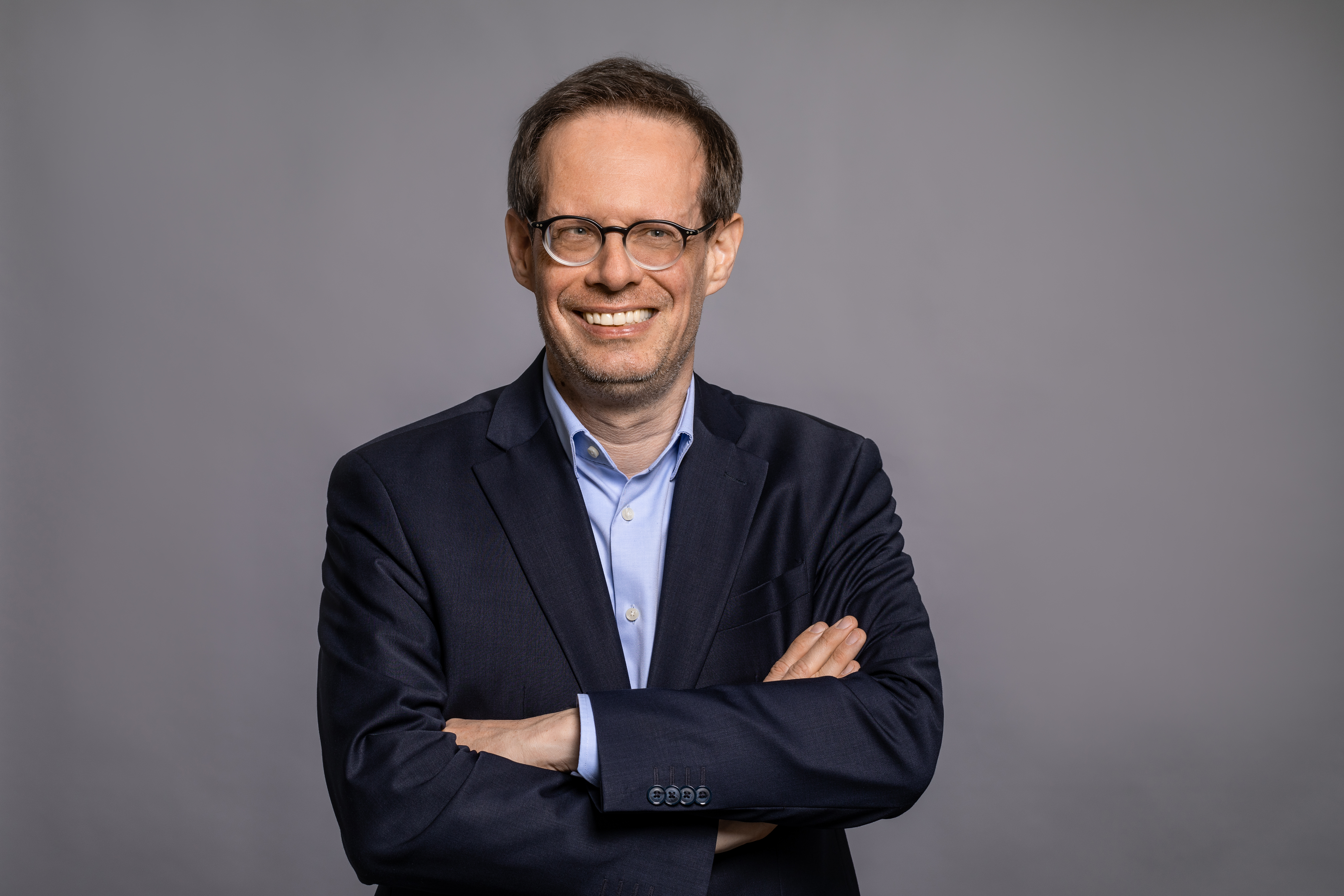

Member of the Bundestag for Baden-Württemberg
- In office 2021–2025
- Constituency: FDP List

Personal details
- Born: 1977 (age 48–49) Heidelberg, West Germany
- Party: Free Democratic Party
- Education: University of Freiburg; University of Mannheim; University of Louvain

Konrad Stockmeier (born 1977) is a German economist and politician of the Free Democratic Party (FDP) who has been serving as a member of the Bundestag from 2021 to 2025.

== Early life and career ==
Stockmeier was born in 1977 in the West German city of Heidelberg. From 2003 to 2009, he worked as scientific assistant at the University of Hagen and RWTH Aachen University.

== Political career ==
Stockmeier joined the FDP in 1998. He became a member of the Bundestag in the 2021 elections, representing the Mannheim district. In parliament, he has since been serving on the Committee on European Affairs and the Committee on Climate Action and Energy.

== Other activities ==
- German Industry Initiative for Energy Efficiency (DENEFF), Member of the Parliamentary Advisory Board
