= Piotrowice =

Piotrowice may refer to:

- Piotrowice - Ochojec, a district of the city of Katowice (S Poland)
- Piotrowice (Katowice), a part of Piotrowice-Ochojec district of Katowice (S Poland)
- Piotrowice, Jawor County in Lower Silesian Voivodeship (south-west Poland)
- Piotrowice, Kłodzko County in Lower Silesian Voivodeship (south-west Poland)
- Piotrowice, Legnica County in Lower Silesian Voivodeship (south-west Poland)
- Piotrowice, Polkowice County in Lower Silesian Voivodeship (south-west Poland)
- Piotrowice, Strzelin County in Lower Silesian Voivodeship (south-west Poland)
- Piotrowice, Gmina Kostomłoty, Środa County in Lower Silesian Voivodeship (south-west Poland)
- Piotrowice, Lublin County in Lublin Voivodeship (east Poland)
- Piotrowice, Łowicz County in Łódź Voivodeship (central Poland)
- Piotrowice, Sieradz County in Łódź Voivodeship (central Poland)
- Piotrowice, Puławy County in Lublin Voivodeship (east Poland)
- Piotrowice, Ryki County in Lublin Voivodeship (east Poland)
- Piotrowice, Oświęcim County in Lesser Poland Voivodeship (south Poland)
- Piotrowice, Proszowice County in Lesser Poland Voivodeship (south Poland)
- Piotrowice, Otwock County in Masovian Voivodeship (east-central Poland)
- Piotrowice, Świętokrzyskie Voivodeship (south-central Poland)
- Piotrowice, Radom County in Masovian Voivodeship (east-central Poland)
- Piotrowice, Leszno County in Greater Poland Voivodeship (west-central Poland)
- Piotrowice, Słupca County in Greater Poland Voivodeship (west-central Poland)
- Piotrowice, Lubusz Voivodeship (west Poland)
- Piotrowice, Nidzica County in Warmian-Masurian Voivodeship (north Poland)
- Piotrowice, Nowe Miasto County in Warmian-Masurian Voivodeship (north Poland)
- Piotrowice, West Pomeranian Voivodeship (north-west Poland)

== See also ==
- Petrovice u Karviné, village in the Czech Republic
