= Isabel Cademartori =

German politician (born 1988)

Isabel Cademartori MdB
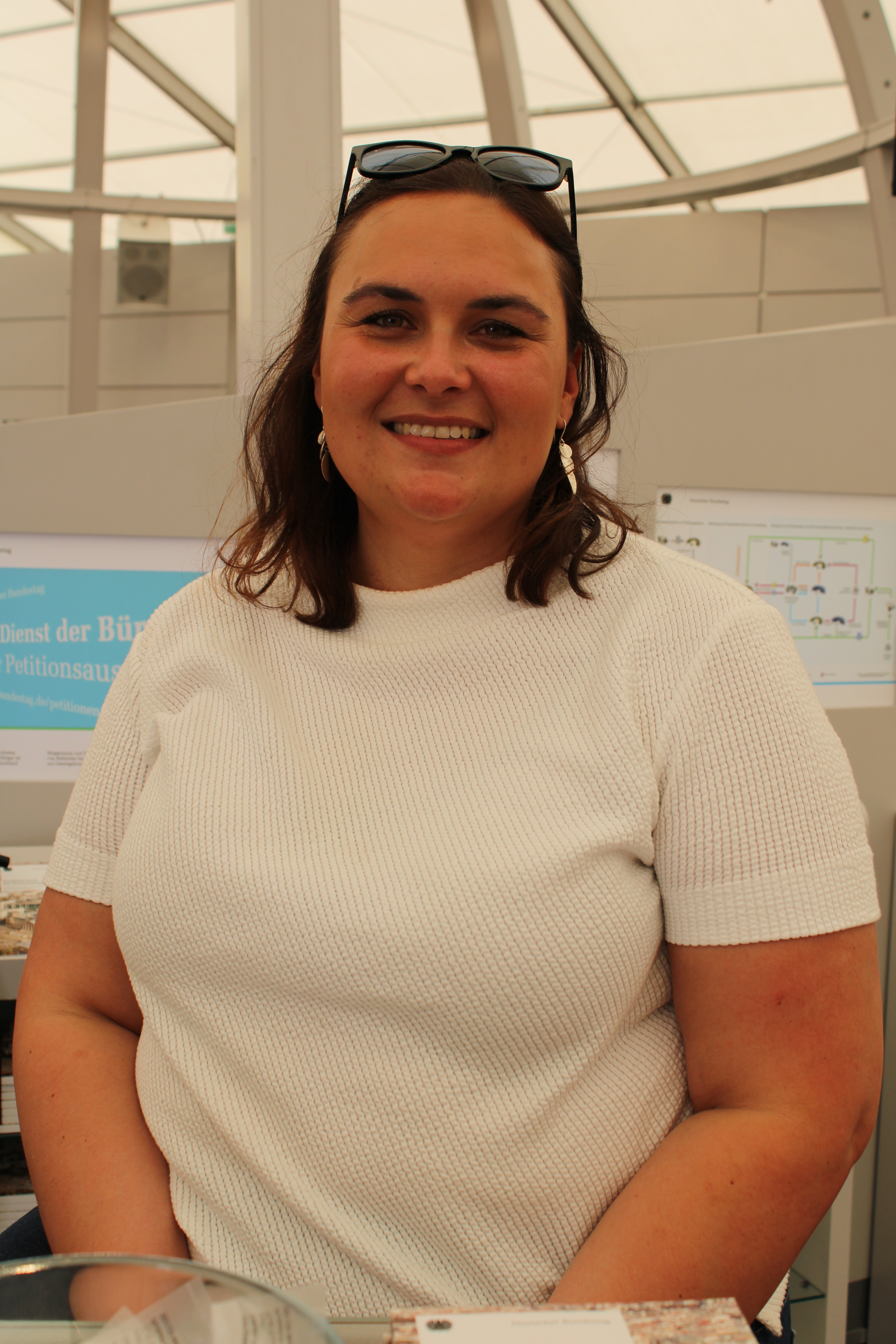
- Cademartori in 2025

Member of the Bundestag; from Baden-Württemberg
- Incumbent
- Assumed office 26 October 2021
- Preceded by: Kordula Kovac
- Constituency: Mannheim (2021–2025); State list (2025–present)

Personal details
- Born: 9 January 1988 (age 38) Bad Saarow-Pieskow, East Germany
- Party: Social Democratic
- Relatives: José Cademartori (grandfather)
- Education: University of Mannheim
- Website: cademartori.de

Isabel Andrea Cademartori Dujisin (born 9 January 1988 in Bad Saarow-Pieskow) is a German politician (SPD) who was elected as Member of the Bundestag for Mannheim in the 2021 federal election.

== Early life ==
Cademartori’s parents had met while studying at the University of Leipzig. In 1989, before the fall of the Berlin Wall and after the referendum in Chile that sealed the end of the Augusto Pinochet dictatorship, the family moved to her father's country of origin and lived in Santiago de Chile, where she attended the German School. After her parents' failed marriage, she returned to Germany with her mother and brother in 2000 and lived in Hanover. After a year abroad in South Africa (2004/2005), she completed her Abitur at the Sophienschule Hanover in 2007.

She graduated from the University of Mannheim Business School. After she obtained a Master of Science in Business Education, also in Mannheim. After graduating, she worked as a research assistant and lecturer at the Chair of Business Education at the University of Mannheim from 2014 and most recently at the Baden-Württemberg state parliament. From 2019 to 2020, Cademartori was a doctoral candidate and doctoral scholarship holder of the Friedrich Ebert Foundation.

== Political career ==
Since 2012, she has been involved as a district councillor in the city centre and in the Jungbusch district, in the Mannheim SPD district association and at state level of the party, becoming deputy state chairwoman of the Baden-Württemberg Jusos. Cademartori served as a city councillor in Mannheim since 2019, and since December 2020, deputy leader of the SPD parliamentary group in the city council and spokesperson for urban development and mobility. In September 2022, she resigned her seat on the municipal council due to her election to the Bundestag.

She is a member of the state executive of the SPD Baden-Württemberg. In October 2020, she became the SPD's Bundestag candidate for Mannheim. Cademartori was elected to the Bundestag in the 2021 German federal election. She won the direct mandate in the constituency of Mannheim (275) with 26.35% to 22.53% of the first votes against Melis Sekmen (Alliance 90/The Greens), who lost in the first round. In the 20th German Bundestag, she is a full member. In the 20th German Bundestag, she is a full member of the Transport Committee and a deputy member of the Health Committee and the Committee on Housing, Urban Development, Construction and Local Authorities. In September 2023, Cademartori was elected transport policy spokesperson for the SPD parliamentary group in the Bundestag. She is a member of the Seeheimer Kreis. Cademartori is in favour of the use of nuclear power. In May 2024, she spoke out in favour of Germany recognising Palestine as a state, following the example of other EU states. In the 2025 federal election, she managed to regain a seat in the Bundestag by being placed 9th on the SPD Baden-Württemberg state list.

In the negotiations to form a Grand Coalition under the leadership of Friedrich Merz's Christian Democrats (CDU together with the Bavarian CSU) and the SPD following the 2025 German elections, Cademartori was again part of the SPD delegation in the working group on transport, infrastructure and housing, led by Ina Scharrenbach, Ulrich Lange, Klara Geywitz and Sören Bartol.

== Other activities ==
- Federal Network Agency for Electricity, Gas, Telecommunications, Posts and Railway (BNetzA), Alternate Member of the Rail Infrastructure Advisory Council (since 2022)
- Business Forum of the Social Democratic Party of Germany, Member of the Political Advisory Board (since 2022)

== Personal life ==
Cademartori's grandfather, the economist and political scientist José Cademartori (1930–2024) was a member of the Communist Party of Chile and under Salvador Allende was briefly Minister for Economy, Development and Reconstruction between July 5, 1973, and September 11. After the coup in Chile in 1973 by Augusto Pinochet, the family had to flee South America and came to East Germany via Venezuela and Cuba, where her parents met while studying at the University of Leipzig.

Cademartori is single and lives in the Neckarstadt-Ost district of Mannheim. She has an older sister and a younger brother. She has both German and Chilean citizenship. She is the chairwoman of the "Friends and Patrons of the Herschelbad in Mannheim e.V." association.

== See also ==
- List of members of the 20th Bundestag
