= Petrovce, Rimavská Sobota District =

Petrovce Gömörpéterfala
- Municipality
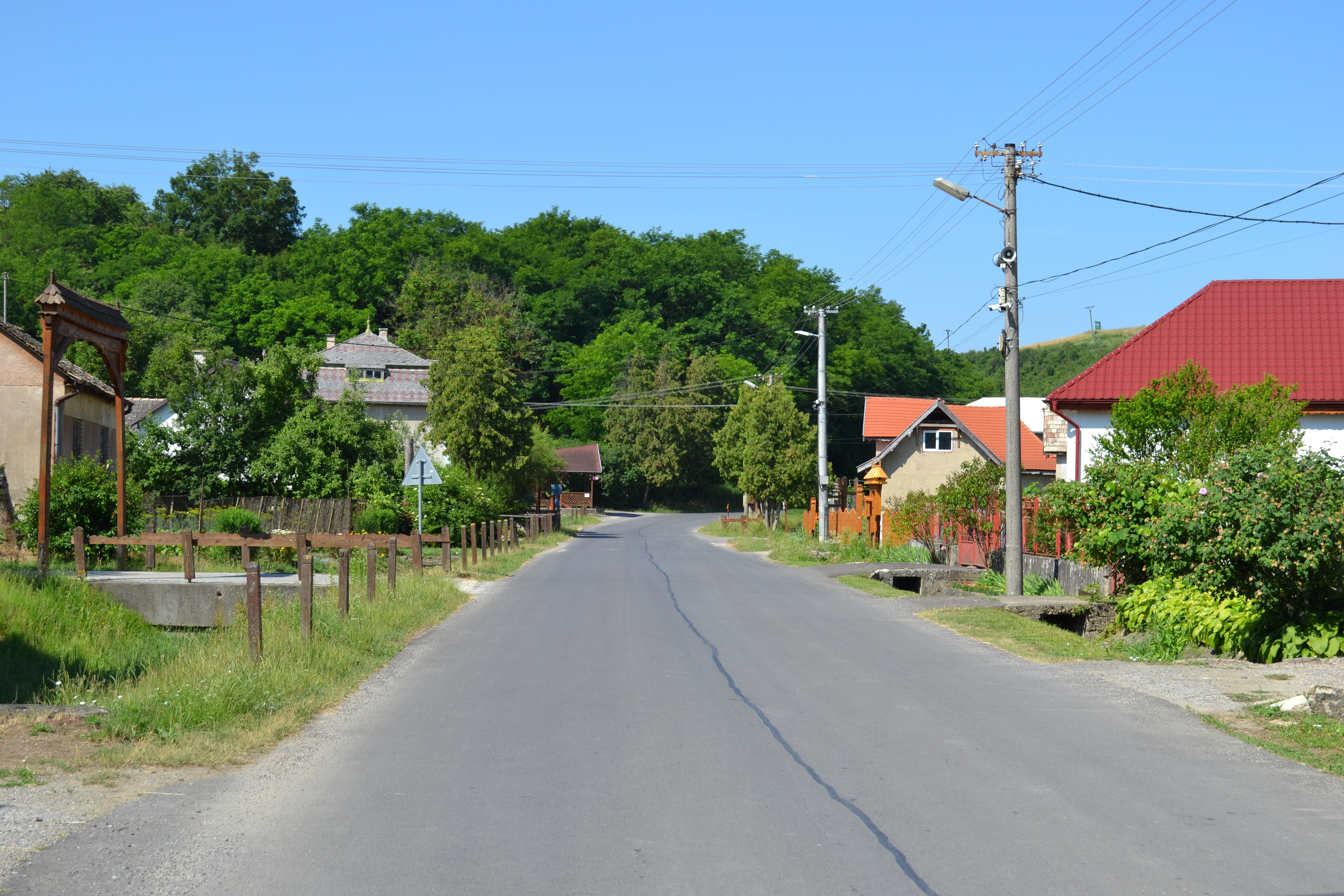

- Flag

- Location of Petrovce in the Banská Bystrica Region Location of Petrovce in Slovakia
- Coordinates: 48°11′12″N 20°01′11″E
- Country: Slovakia
- Region: Banská Bystrica Region
- District: Rimavská Sobota District
- First mentioned: 1427

Area
  - Total: 19.07 km^{2} (7.36 sq mi)
- Elevation: 236 m (774 ft)

Population (2025)
  - Total: 209
- Time zone: UTC+1 (CET)
  - Summer (DST): UTC+2 (CEST)
- Postal code: 980 35
- Area code: +421 47
- Vehicle registration plate (until 2022): RS
- Website: www.petrovce.sk

Petrovce (Hungarian: Gömörpéterfala) is a village and municipality in the Rimavská Sobota District of the Banská Bystrica Region of southern Slovakia.

== Population ==
Population statistic (10 years)
| Year | 1995 | 2005 | 2015 | 2025 |
|---|---|---|---|---|
| Count | 283 | 257 | 233 | 209 |
| Difference | | −9.18% | −9.33% | −10.30% |

Population statistic
| Year | 2024 | 2025 |
|---|---|---|
| Count | 210 | 209 |
| Difference | | −0.47% |

It has a population of 209 people (31 December 2025).

=== Ethnicity ===
Census 2021 (1+ %)
| Ethnicity | Number | Fraction |
|---|---|---|
| Hungarian | 197 | 94.71% |
| Slovak | 18 | 8.65% |
| Not found out | 8 | 3.84% |
| Total | 208 | |

In year 2021 was 208 people by ethnicity 197 as Hungarian, 18 as Slovak, 8 as Not found out and 1 as Other.

Note on population: The difference values of population numbers in the table "Population statistic" and in the sections "Ethnicity" & "Religion" is caused by the use of various statistical methods.

=== Religion ===
Census 2021 (1+ %)
| Religion | Number | Fraction |
|---|---|---|
| Roman Catholic Church | 177 | 85.1% |
| None | 14 | 6.73% |
| Calvinist Church | 5 | 2.4% |
| Not found out | 3 | 1.44% |
| Other | 3 | 1.44% |
| Seventh-day Adventist Church | 3 | 1.44% |
| Total | 208 | |

In year 2021 was 208 people by religion 177 from Roman Catholic Church, 14 from None, 5 from Calvinist Church, 3 from Not found out, 3 from Other, 3 from Seventh-day Adventist Church, 2 from Evangelical Church and 1 from Greek Catholic Church.
