= Piotrowice, Oświęcim County =

Piotrowice
- Village
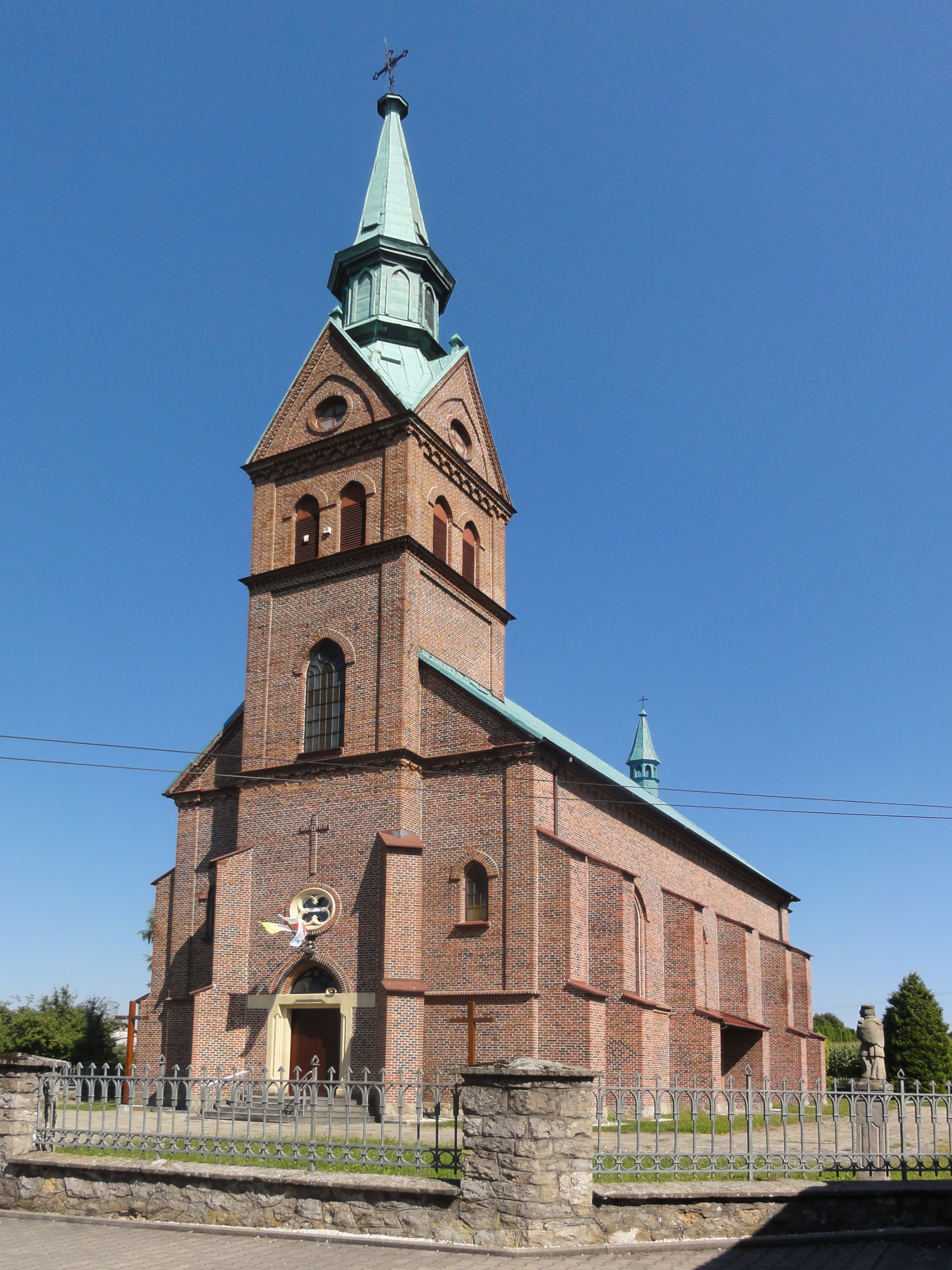
- Catholic church

- Location within Poland
- Coordinates: 49°58′43″N 19°22′25″E
- Country: Poland
- Voivodeship: Lesser Poland
- County: Oświęcim
- Gmina: Przeciszów
- Population (approx.): 2,000

Piotrowice [pjɔtrɔˈvit͡sɛ] is a village in the administrative district of Gmina Przeciszów, within Oświęcim County, Lesser Poland Voivodeship, in southern Poland.

The village has an approximate population of 2,000.
