= Jezeřany-Maršovice =

- Municipality
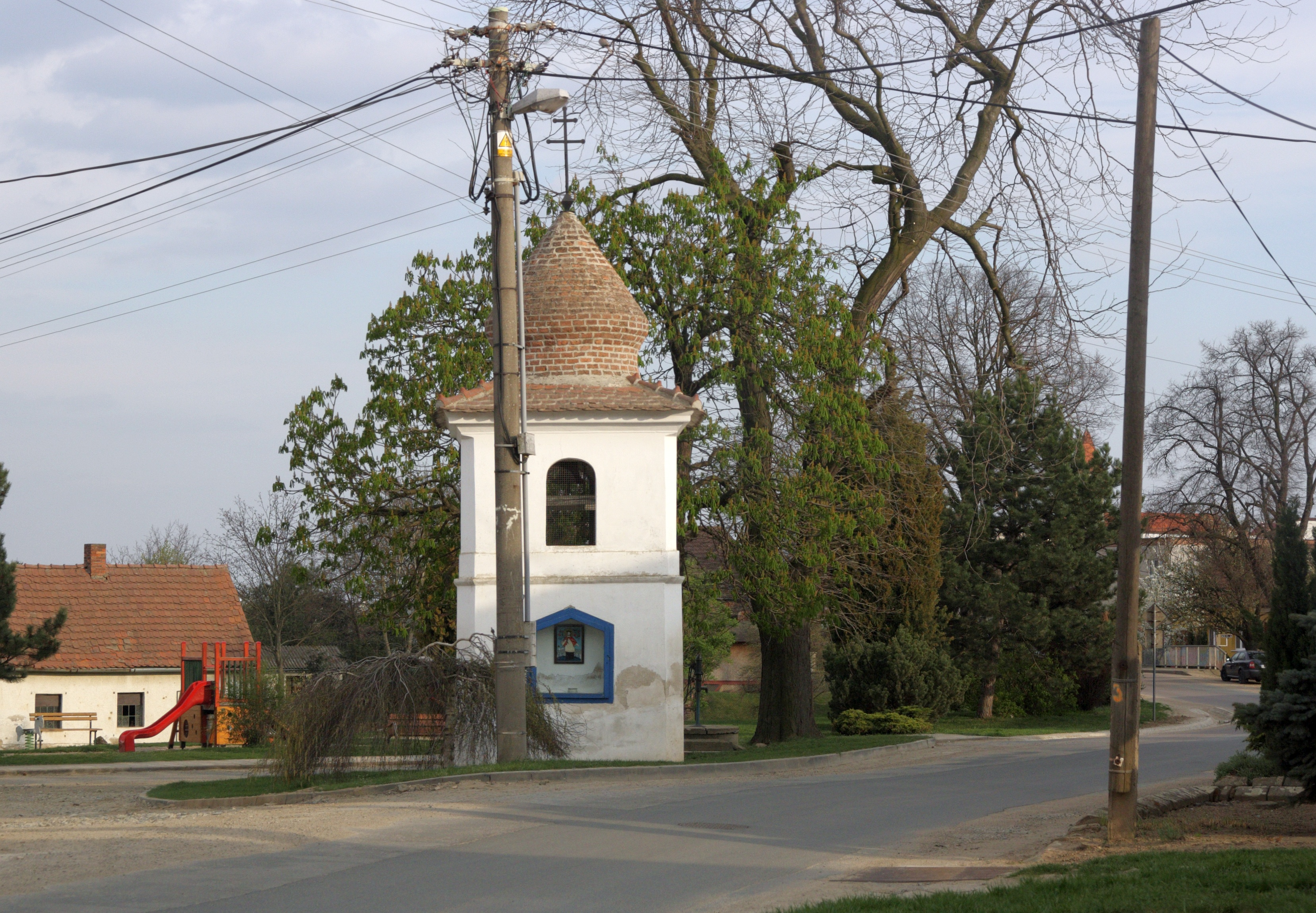
- Centre of Maršovice

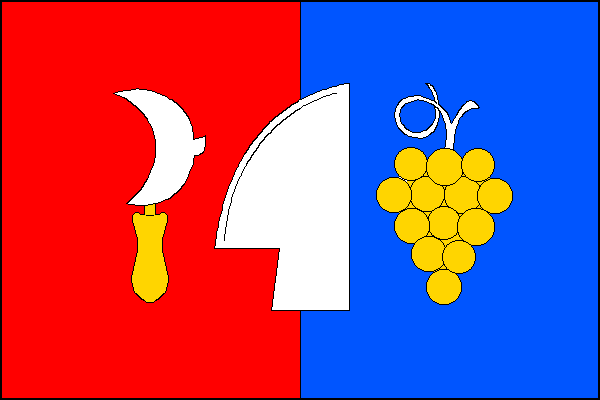
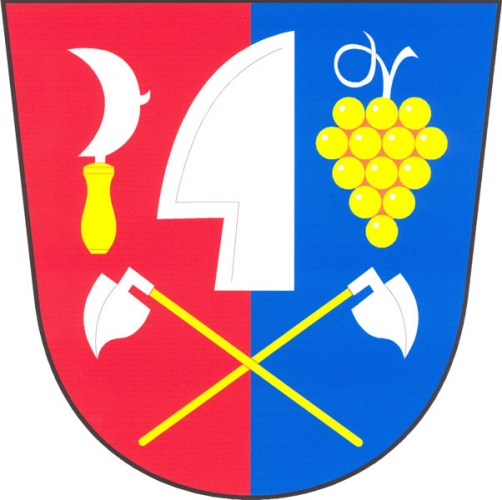
- Flag Coat of arms

- Location in the Czech Republic
- Coordinates: 49°1′44″N 16°26′14″E
- Country: Czech Republic
- Region: South Moravian
- District: Znojmo
- First mentioned: 1306

Area
  - Total: 10.65 km^{2} (4.11 sq mi)
- Elevation: 219 m (719 ft)

Population (2026-01-01)
  - Total: 782
  - Density: 73.4/km^{2} (190/sq mi)
- Time zone: UTC+1 (CET)
  - Summer (DST): UTC+2 (CEST)
- Postal code: 671 75
- Website: www.jezerany-marsovice.cz

Jezeřany-Maršovice is a municipality and village in Znojmo District in the South Moravian Region of the Czech Republic. It has about 800 inhabitants.

Jezeřany-Maršovice lies approximately 36 kilometres (22 mi) north-east of Znojmo, 23 km (14 mi) south-west of Brno, and 187 km (116 mi) south-east of Prague.

== History ==
Jezeřany-Maršovice was originally two separate villages with different history and owners. The first written mention of Jezeřany is from 1306, when it was owned by the monastery in Želiv. In the 16th century, it was property of the Strahov Monastery. Maršovice was first mentioned in 1356, when it was owned by the Rosa coeli convent in Dolní Kounice. Later the two villages urbanistically fused and now form one continuous village. The municipalities were merged in 1960.

== Demographics ==
Historical population
Year	Pop.	±%
1869	708	—
1880	848	+19.8%
1890	887	+4.6%
1900	935	+5.4%
1910	1,030	+10.2%
1921	1,052	+2.1%
1930	1,054	+0.2%
1950	868	−17.6%
1961	929	+7.0%
1970	939	+1.1%
1980	796	−15.2%
1991	713	−10.4%
2001	710	−0.4%
2011	761	+7.2%
2021	776	+2.0%
Source: Censuses
