= Petrovice (Znojmo District) =

- Municipality
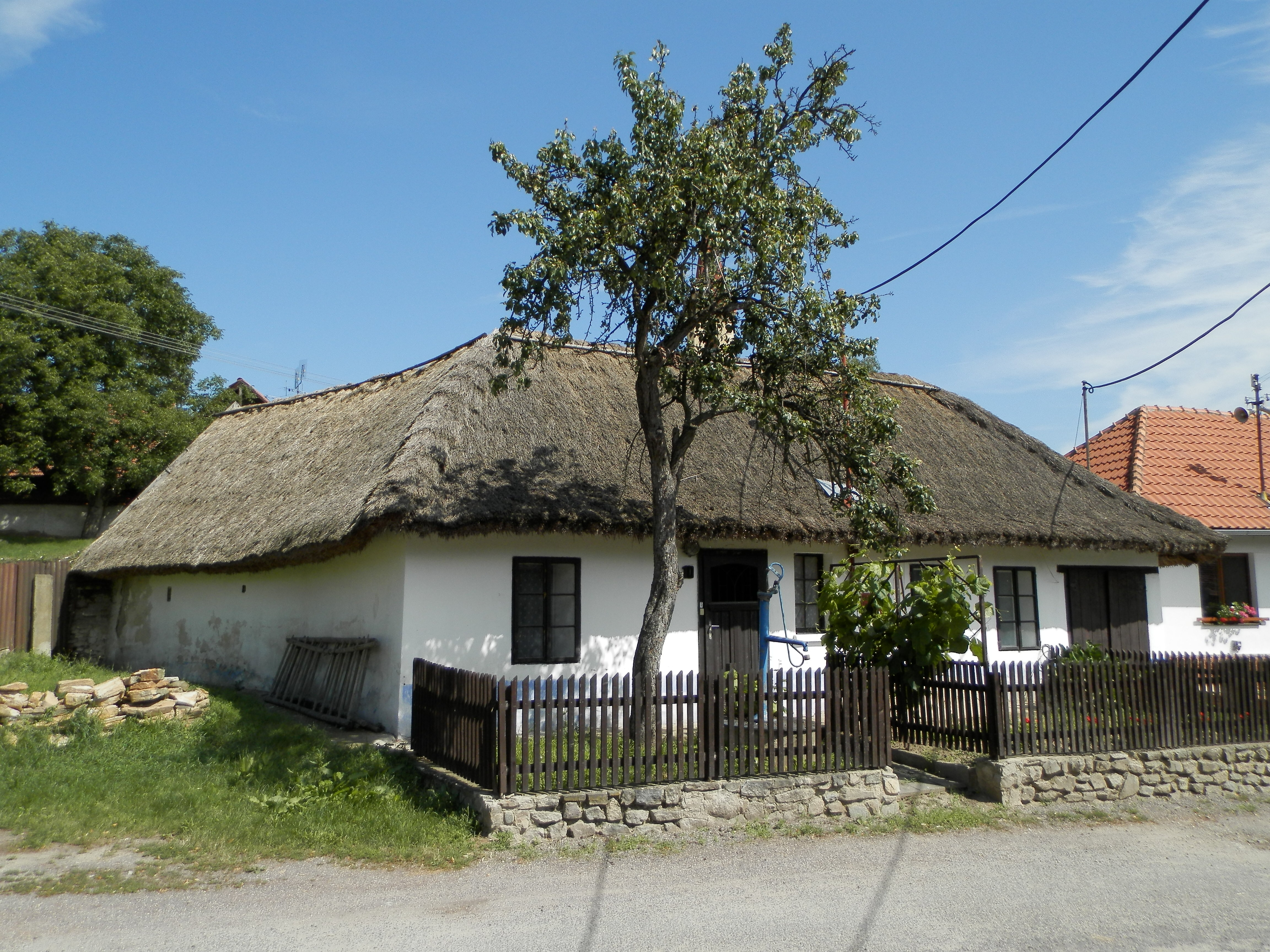
- Homestead No. 10

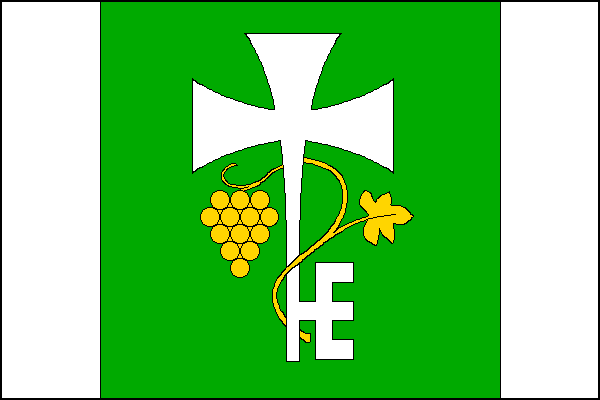
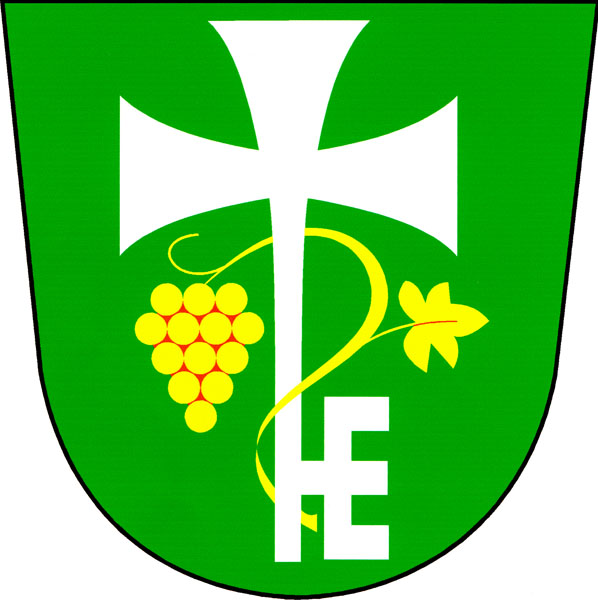
- Flag Coat of arms

- Location in the Czech Republic
- Coordinates: 49°0′24″N 16°17′33″E
- Country: Czech Republic
- Region: South Moravian
- District: Znojmo
- First mentioned: 1253

Area
  - Total: 4.66 km^{2} (1.80 sq mi)
- Elevation: 256 m (840 ft)

Population (2026-01-01)
  - Total: 383
  - Density: 82.2/km^{2} (213/sq mi)
- Time zone: UTC+1 (CET)
  - Summer (DST): UTC+2 (CEST)
- Postal code: 672 01
- Website: petrovice.com

Petrovice is a municipality and village in Znojmo District in the South Moravian Region of the Czech Republic. It has about 400 inhabitants.

Petrovice lies approximately 26 kilometres (16 mi) north-east of Znojmo, 32 km (20 mi) south-west of Brno, and 181 km (112 mi) south-east of Prague.

== Demographics ==
Historical population
Year	Pop.	±%
1869	397	—
1880	399	+0.5%
1890	423	+6.0%
1900	446	+5.4%
1910	398	−10.8%
1921	435	+9.3%
1930	461	+6.0%
1950	413	−10.4%
1961	449	+8.7%
1970	430	−4.2%
1980	427	−0.7%
1991	400	−6.3%
2001	367	−8.3%
2011	342	−6.8%
2021	387	+13.2%
Source: Censuses
