= José Cademartori =

Chilean politician and writer (1930–2024)

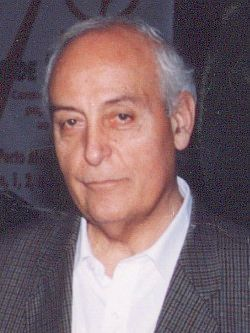
- Cademartori in 2009

Minister of Economy, Development, and Reconstruction
- In office 5 July 1973 – 11 September 1973
- Preceded by: Orlando Millas
- Succeeded by: Rolando González Acevedo

Member of the Chamber of Deputies of Chile for Santiago
- In office 15 May 1957 – 15 May 1973

Personal details
- Born: José Luis Cademartori Invernizzi; 24 September 1930 La Serena, Chile
- Died: 25 June 2024 (aged 93) Santiago, Chile
- Party: PCCh
- Parent: José Cademártori Vaccaro (father)
- Relatives: Isabel Cademartori (granddaughter)
- Education: University of Chile
- Occupation: Politician, academic, writer

José Luis Cademartori Invernizzi (24 September 1930 – 25 June 2024), sometimes Cademártori, was a Chilean commercial engineer, (Note: According to Spanish Wikipedia, "commercial engineering" is "a discipline of economic and administrative sciences that applies knowledge of mathematics, statistics, quantitative methods, operations research, economics, administration, finance, marketing, process engineering, project engineering and information technologies to the solution of social, economic and organizational problems," and its "field of action is broad.") a writer, an academic and a politician. He was elected as a deputy in four consecutive terms, from 1957 to 1973, each time representing the Communist Party of Chile (PCCh). In 1973 he held the office of Minister of Economy, Development and Tourism from July to September that year under President Salvador Allende, although this ended when Allende's Popular Unity coalition government was overthrown by the military.

== Early life ==
Cademartori was born in La Serena. An Italian shopkeeper's son, he spent the greater part of his childhood and youth in the city of Arica in the country's north. He studied at various Catholic schools, including one in Arica run by monks and another in Iquique run by priests, and also at Arica's Liceo (high school) and at the Patrocinio de San José, a Salesian school in Santiago. He later went to the School of Economics at the University of Chile, where he earned his title of Commercial Engineer in 1952. His thesis was entitled "Las cuentas nacionales: naturales y experiencia".

== Political life ==
Between 1952 and 1954, during Carlos Ibáñez del Campo's second time in power, Cademartori worked as a consultant at the Ministry of Finance, then headed by Juan Bautista Rossetti, and then went to the newly created Ministry of Mining, whose head then was Clodomiro Almeyda. Cademartori later went over to CORFO, where he further distinguished himself as the director of the Employees' Association in 1959–1960 and as Advising Senator in 1957. At this time in his life, he was not participating in any political party until in 1954 he wed Xenia Dujisin, whom he had met during his studies, and who belonged to the PCCh. This marked Cademartori's definitive entry into the Communist Party, an entity that was illegal under the 1948 "Damned Law" but that nevertheless was still part of Chile's political life. Cademartori and his wife would have three children.

In 1957, Cademartori was elected deputy for the Seventh Departmental Group "Santiago", First District, backed by the Labour Party (Partido del Trabajo). He was subsequently reelected to the terms 1961–1965, 1965–1969 and 1969–1973. On these three occasions, he stood as a Communist Party candidate (the "Damned Law" had been repealed in 1958.). In his parliamentary career, he participated in the Standing Committee for Finance and the Joint Budget Commission.

On 5 July 1973, Cademartori was named Minister of Economics by President Salvador Allende, an office that he held until 11 September that same year, the day of the military coup d'état. Cademartori then went into hiding at a female comrade's house, but this ended three days after the coup when the woman's husband, who had inexplicably disappeared years earlier, suddenly came home. Cademartori was then imprisoned for three years at the Libertador Bernardo O'Higgins Military Academy, the concentration camp on Dawson Island and in Ritoque (a coastal locality in Quintero), before being sent off into exile in November 1976, together with his wife and children. He lived in Venezuela for six years, where, along with some socialists, radicals and Christian democrats, he organized the Grupo de Caracas, whose intention was to organize exiles and demand democracy's restoration in Chile. He also gave university classes. He spent a year in Cuba and four years in East Germany before going back to his country in 1988, only weeks before the referendum that swept Augusto Pinochet from power.

== Writing ==
After Pinochet's military dictatorship came to an end, Cademartori became a writer and began is academic activities as an assistant and a professor at his alma mater, and also published articles that were critical of neoliberalism. He collaborated on Le Monde diplomatique, La Nación, Rocinante and Punto Final, as well as writing books, which are listed below.

== Death ==
Cademartori died in Santiago on 25 June 2024, at the age of 93.

== Books by Cademartori ==
- La economía chilena: un enfoque marxista ("The Chilean Economy: a Marxist Approach"); 1.ª ed. Santiago: Universitaria, 1968.
- La economía chilena: un enfoque marxista ("The Chilean Economy: a Marxist Approach"); 2.ª ed. Santiago: Universitaria, 1971.
- La economía chilena: un enfoque marxista ("The Chilean Economy: a Marxist Approach"); 3.ª ed. Santiago, Chile: Universitaria, 1972.
- Chile: el modelo neoliberal ("Chile: the Neoliberal Model"); ed. Santiago: ChileAmérica CESOC : ICAL, 1998.
- La globalización cuestionada ("Globalization Questioned"); 2.ª ed. Santiago de Chile: Universidad de Santiago de Chile, 2012.
- Marx en el siglo XXI: la vigencia del(os) marxismo(s) para comprender y superar el capitalismo actual ("Marx in the 21st Century: the Validity of Marxism(s) in Understanding and Overcoming the Current Capitalism"); 1.ª ed. Santiago de Chile : LOM Ediciones, 2011.
- Memorias del exilio ("Memories of Exile"); Santiago de Chile : Editorial USACH, 2012.
- La Humanidad Sobrante. Una Indagación sobre el Desempleo ("Surplus Humanity: an Investigation into Unemployment"); 1.ª ed. Universidad de Santiago de Chile, 2014.
