= Puklice =

- Municipality
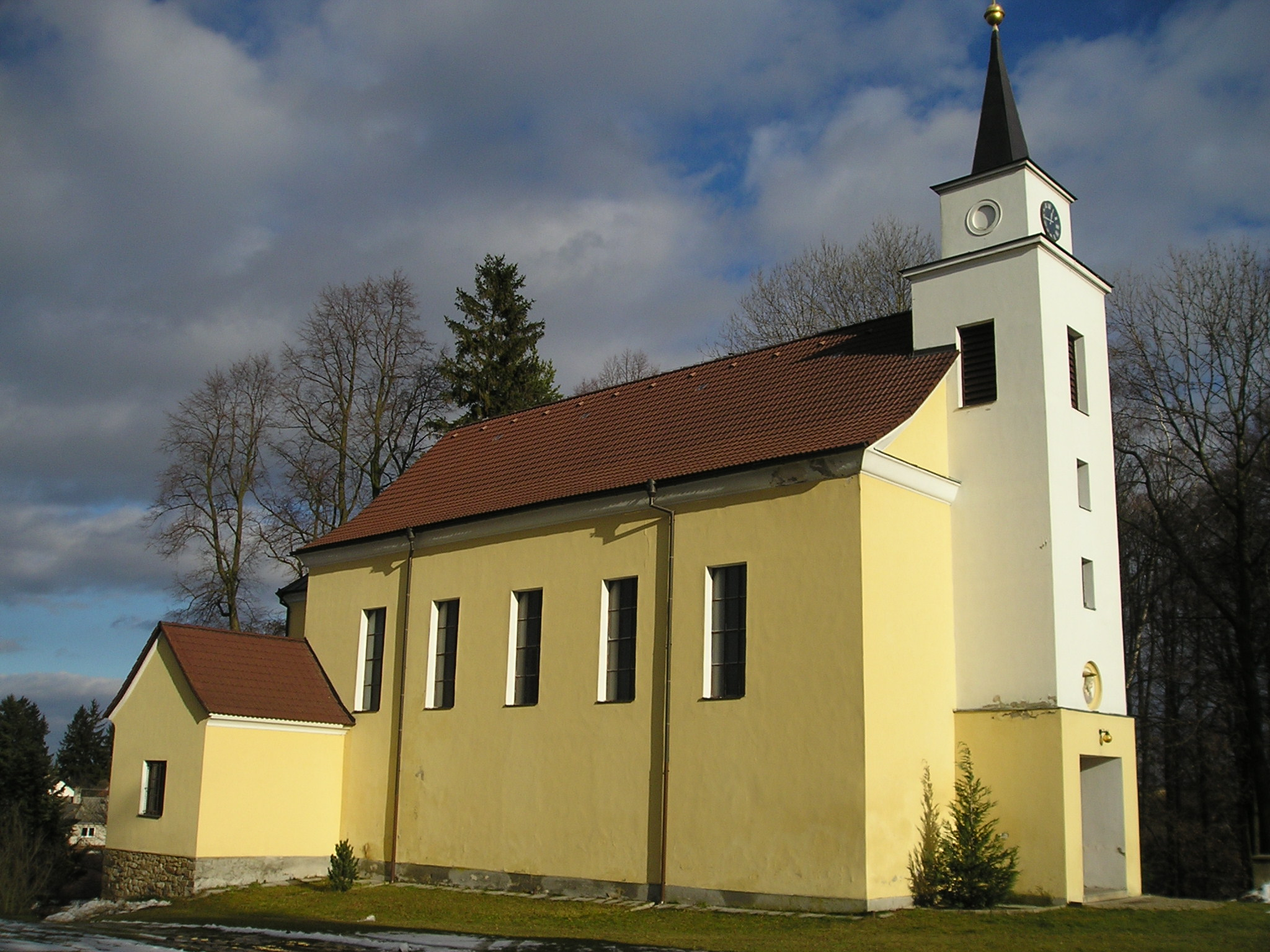
- Church of the Assumption of the Virgin Mary

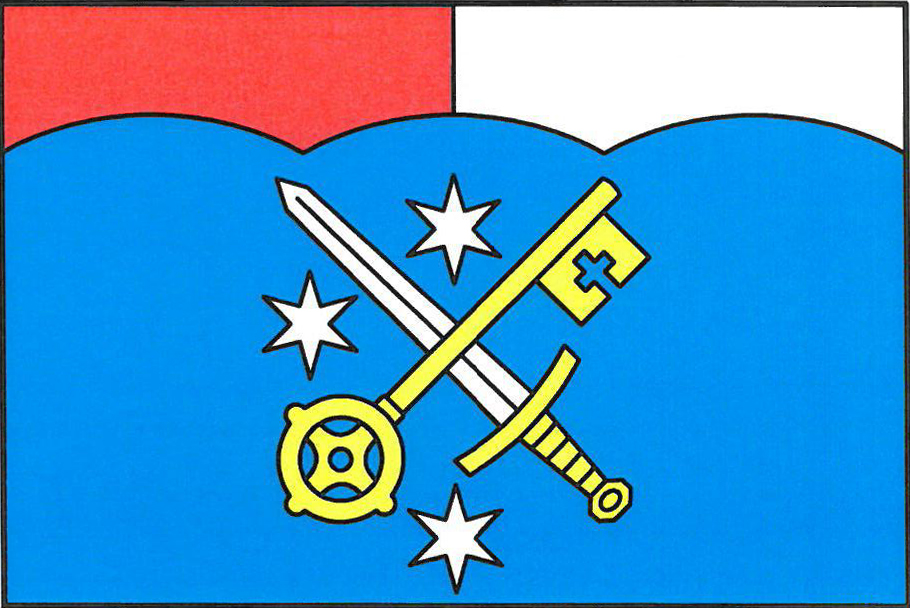
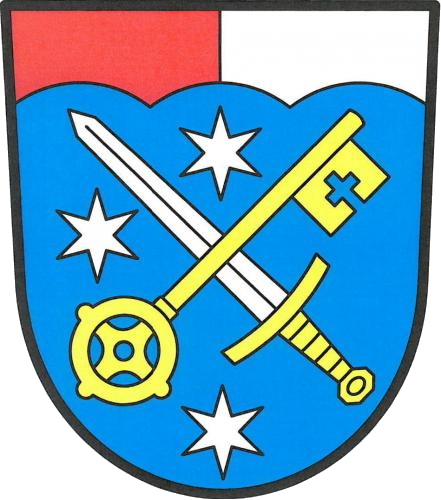
- Flag Coat of arms

- Location in the Czech Republic
- Coordinates: 49°21′39″N 15°39′3″E
- Country: Czech Republic
- Region: Vysočina
- District: Jihlava
- First mentioned: 1318

Area
  - Total: 10.93 km^{2} (4.22 sq mi)
- Elevation: 528 m (1,732 ft)

Population (2026-01-01)
  - Total: 904
  - Density: 82.7/km^{2} (214/sq mi)
- Time zone: UTC+1 (CET)
  - Summer (DST): UTC+2 (CEST)
- Postal code: 588 31
- Website: www.obecpuklice.cz

Puklice (Czech pronunciation: [ˈpuklɪtsɛ]) is a municipality and village in Jihlava District in the Vysočina Region of the Czech Republic. It has about 900 inhabitants.

== Administrative division ==
Puklice consists of three municipal parts (in brackets population according to the 2021 census):

- Puklice (647)
- Petrovice (10)
- Studénky (172)

== History ==
The first written mention of Puklice is from 1318.

== Demographics ==
Historical population
| Year | Pop. | ±% |
|---|---|---|
| 1869 | 1,131 | — |
| 1880 | 1,063 | −6.0% |
| 1890 | 1,158 | +8.9% |
| 1900 | 1,167 | +0.8% |
| 1910 | 1,124 | −3.7% |
| 1921 | 1,021 | −9.2% |
| 1930 | 1,130 | +10.7% |
| 1950 | 833 | −26.3% |
| 1961 | 838 | +0.6% |
| 1970 | 786 | −6.2% |
| 1980 | 720 | −8.4% |
| 1991 | 697 | −3.2% |
| 2001 | 732 | +5.0% |
| 2011 | 775 | +5.9% |
| 2021 | 829 | +7.0% |
Source: Censuses
