= Petrovice u Sušice =

- Municipality
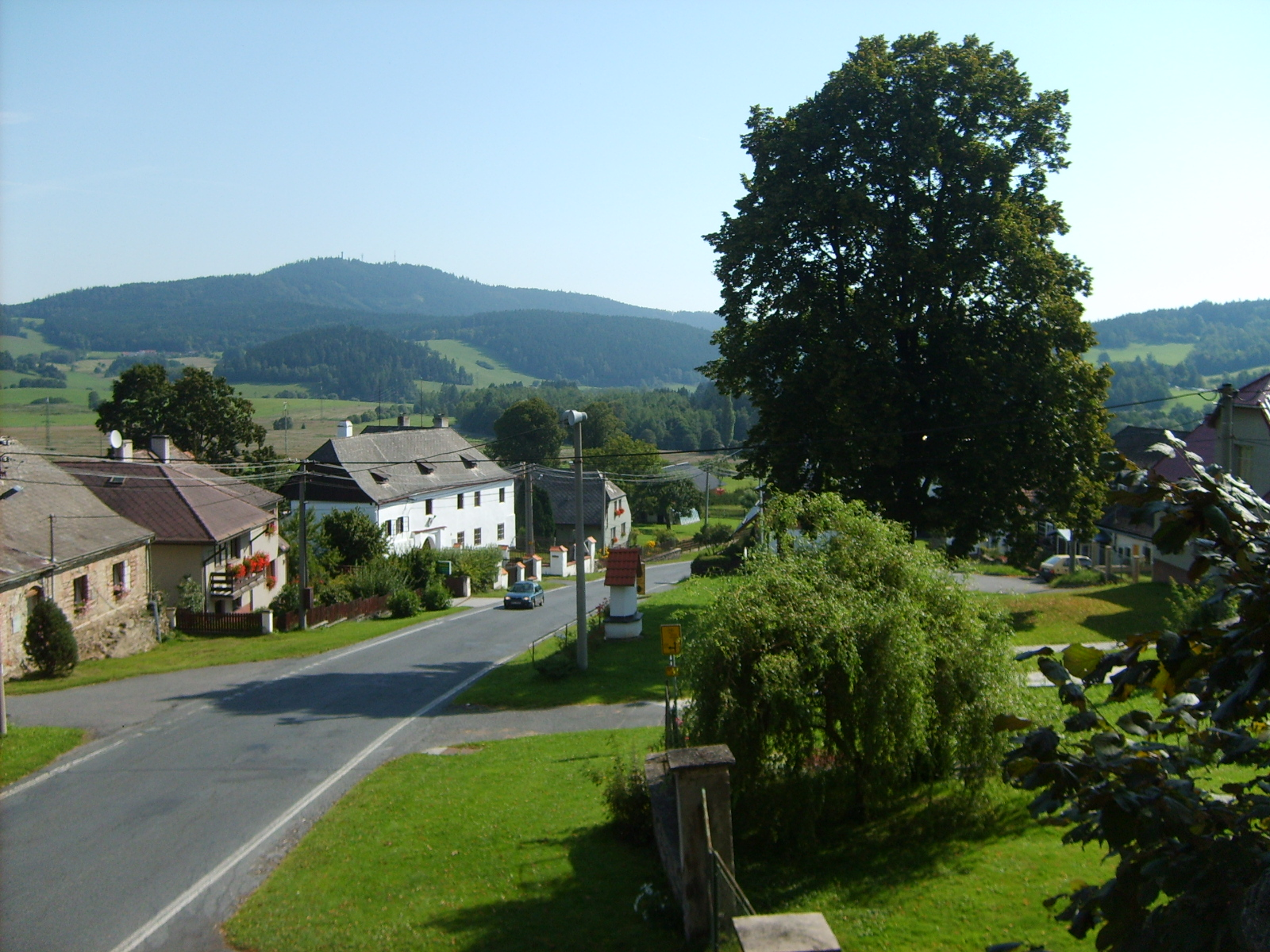
- Lower part of Petrovice u Sušice

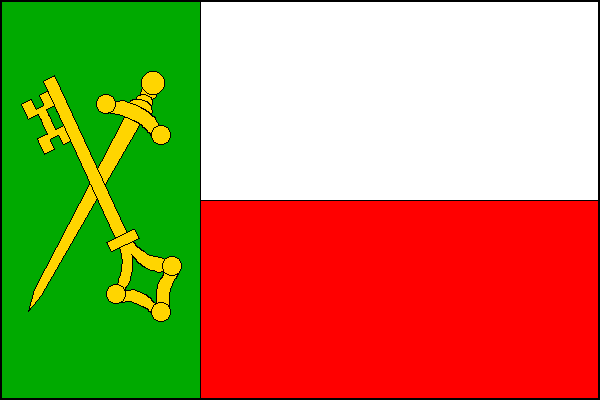
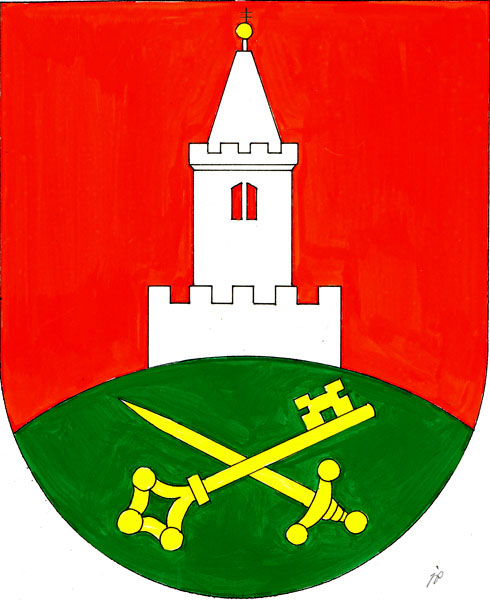
- Flag Coat of arms

- Location in the Czech Republic
- Coordinates: 49°13′8″N 13°26′27″E
- Country: Czech Republic
- Region: Plzeň
- District: Klatovy
- First mentioned: 1319

Area
  - Total: 26.60 km^{2} (10.27 sq mi)
- Elevation: 558 m (1,831 ft)

Population (2026-01-01)
  - Total: 664
  - Density: 25.0/km^{2} (64.7/sq mi)
- Time zone: UTC+1 (CET)
  - Summer (DST): UTC+2 (CEST)
- Postal code: 342 01
- Website: www.petroviceususice.cz

Petrovice u Sušice is a municipality and village in Klatovy District in the Plzeň Region of the Czech Republic. It has about 700 inhabitants.

Petrovice u Sušice lies approximately 23 kilometres (14 mi) south-east of Klatovy, 59 km (37 mi) south of Plzeň, and 120 km (75 mi) south-west of Prague.

== Administrative division ==
Petrovice u Sušice consists of 18 municipal parts (in brackets population according to the 2021 census):

- Petrovice u Sušice (244)
- Břetětice (30)
- Částkov (5)
- Chamutice (2)
- Dolní Kochánov (0)
- Františkova Ves (44)
- Jiřičná (27)
- Kojšice (6)
- Maršovice (16)
- Nová Víska (9)
- Pařezí (28)
- Posobice (14)
- Rovná (18)
- Strunkov (13)
- Svojšice (56)
- Trsice (19)
- Vojetice (60)
- Žikov (16)

== History ==
The first written mention of Petrovice u Sušice is from 1319.

== Demographics ==
Historical population
Year	Pop.	±%
1869	1,933	—
1880	1,954	+1.1%
1890	1,908	−2.4%
1900	1,876	−1.7%
1910	1,803	−3.9%
1921	1,764	−2.2%
1930	1,501	−14.9%
1950	977	−34.9%
1961	1,043	+6.8%
1970	897	−14.0%
1980	820	−8.6%
1991	707	−13.8%
2001	674	−4.7%
2011	580	−13.9%
2021	607	+4.7%
Source: Censuses
