= Melis Sekmen =

German politician (born 1993)

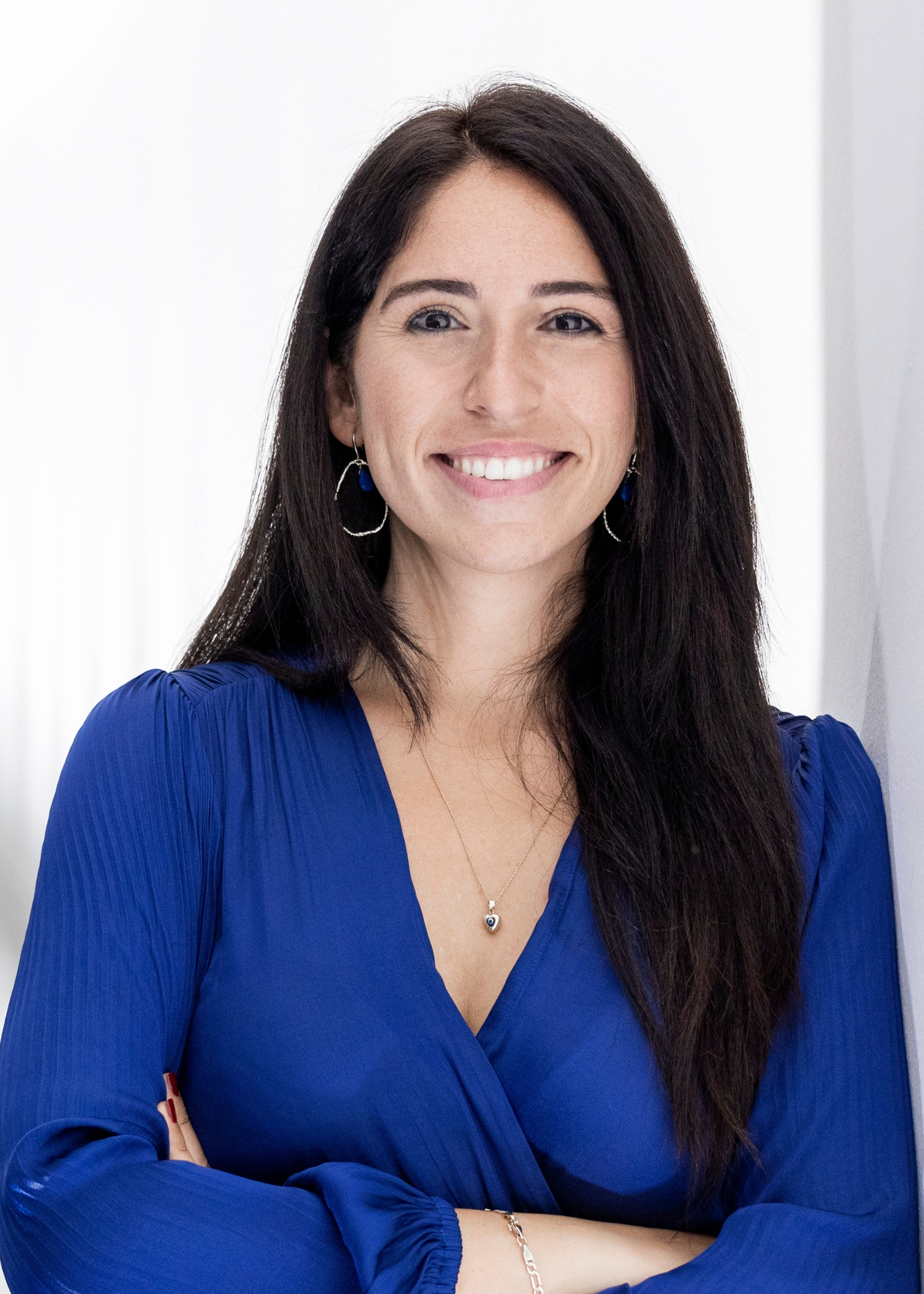
- Sekmen in 2023

Member of the Bundestag for Baden-Württemberg
- In office 26 October 2021 – March 2025
- Constituency: The Greens list (2021–2025)

Personal details
- Born: 26 September 1993 (age 32) Mannheim, Germany
- Party: CDU (2024–present)
- Other political affiliations: The Greens (2011–2024)

Melis Sekmen (born 26 September 1993) is a German politician. She was a member of the German Bundestag from the Christian Democratic Union (CDU) from 2021 until 2025. She previously was a member of the Alliance 90/The Greens party. She is of Turkish descent.

== Political career ==
In the Bundestag, Sekmen served on the Committee on Economic Affairs. In addition to her committee assignments, she has been a member of the German delegation to the Franco-German Parliamentary Assembly since 2022.

Elected as a Green in 2021, she resigned from her former party and its Bundestag fraction on 1 July 2024, intending to apply for membership in the CDU and the CDU/CSU (Union) parliamentary group. Sekmen said, "My idea of how and in what style politics is done has evolved." Sekmen's differences of opinion with the Green Party's majority line had recently become apparent primarily in the areas of migration and the economy; for example, she had called for a "change of course" in migration and integration policy. She also cited her recognition of the Union's new basic program as a reason for the switch. On 9 July, Sekmen was admitted to the CDU. She is thus the first Green member of the Bundestag to switch to the Union parties since Vera Lengsfeld in 1996, and the third CDU member of Turkish origin after Cemile Giousouf and Serap Güler.
