= Skorošice =

- Municipality
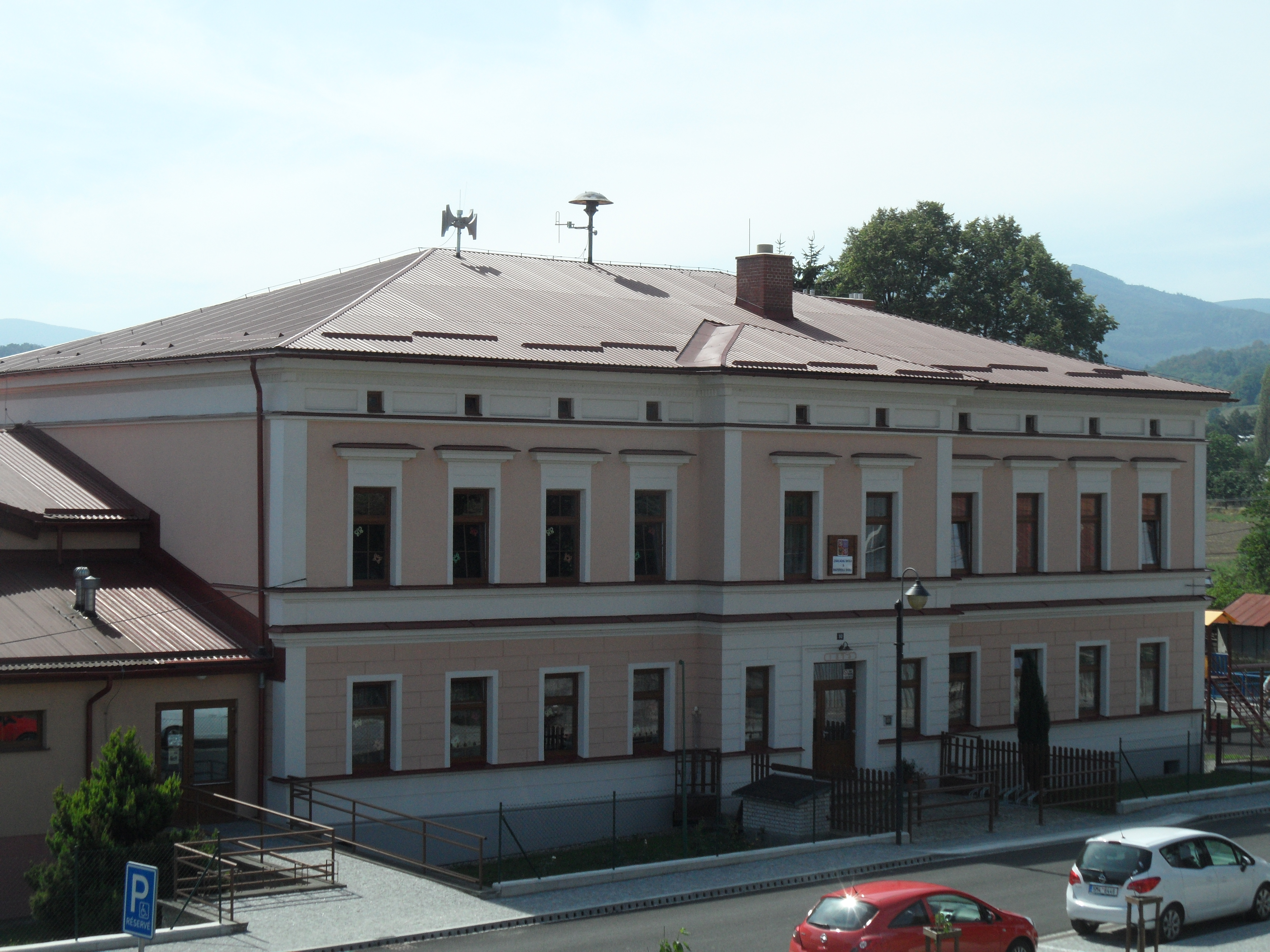
- Primary school and kindergarten

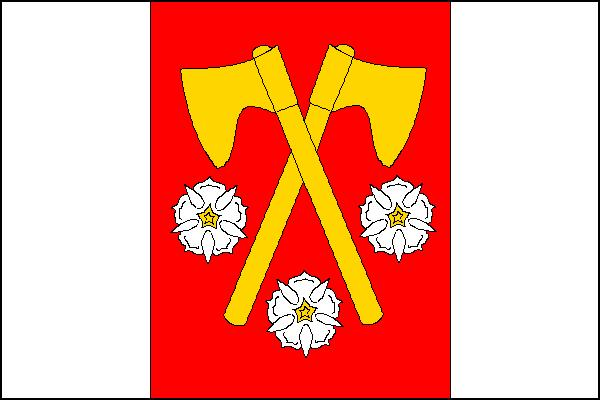
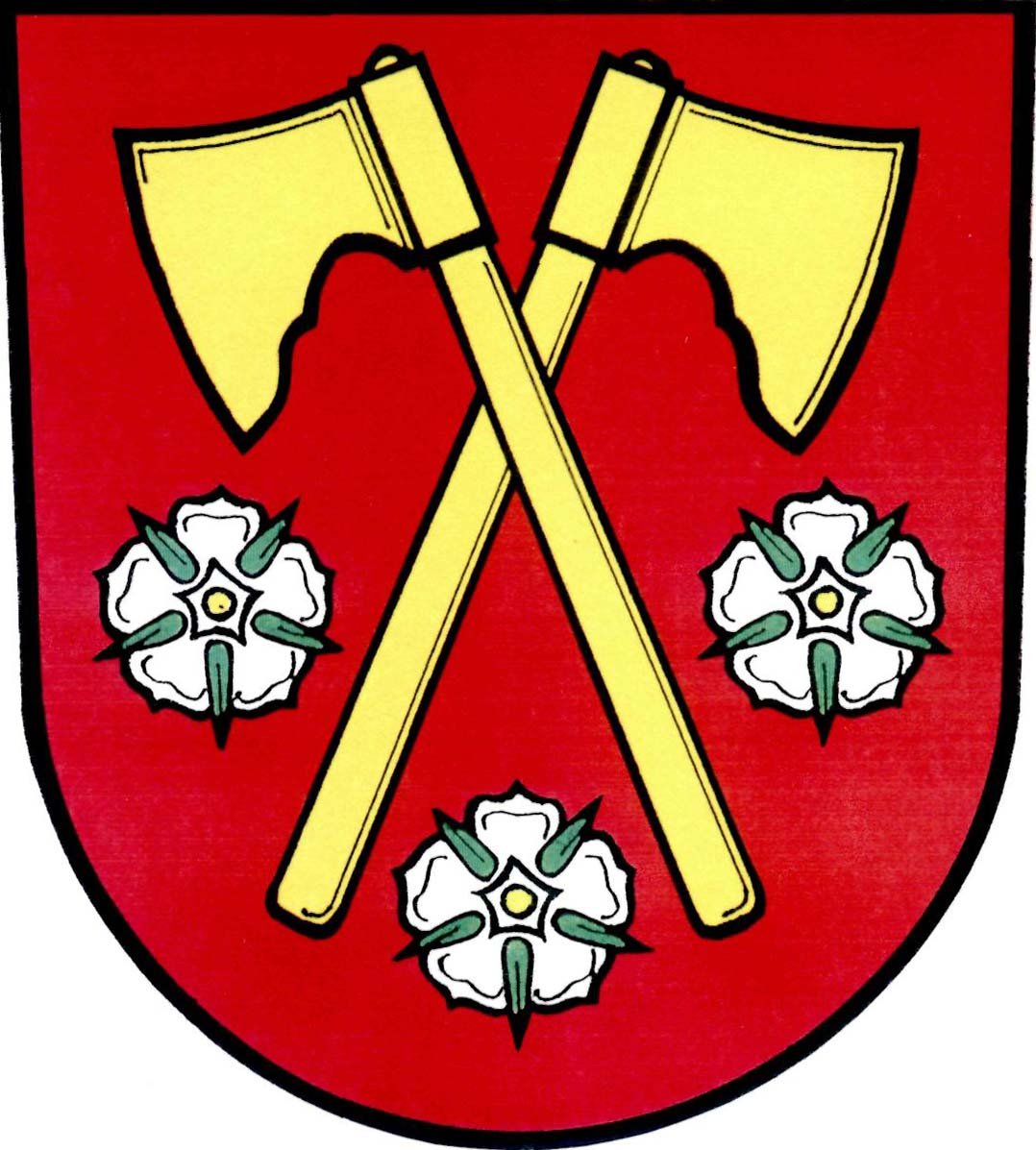
- Flag Coat of arms

- Location in the Czech Republic
- Coordinates: 50°18′31″N 17°4′51″E
- Country: Czech Republic
- Region: Olomouc
- District: Jeseník
- First mentioned: 1290

Area
  - Total: 46.47 km^{2} (17.94 sq mi)
- Elevation: 404 m (1,325 ft)

Population (2026-01-01)
  - Total: 656
  - Density: 14.1/km^{2} (36.6/sq mi)
- Time zone: UTC+1 (CET)
  - Summer (DST): UTC+2 (CEST)
- Postal code: 790 65
- Website: www.skorosice.cz

Skorošice (German: Gurschdorf) is a municipality and village in Jeseník District in the Olomouc Region of the Czech Republic. It has about 700 inhabitants.

== Administrative division ==
Skorošice consists of two municipal parts (in brackets population according to the 2021 census):

- Skorošice (619)
- Petrovice (51)

== Geography ==
Skorošice is located about 13 kilometres (8 mi) northwest of Jeseník and 80 km (50 mi) north of Olomouc, on the border with Poland. The larger part of the municipal territory lies in the Golden Mountains, only the eastern part lies in the Žulová Hilly Land. The highest point is on the slope of the Smrk mountain at 1,110 m (3,642 ft) above sea level. The built-up area is situated in the valley of the stream Skorošický potok.

== History ==
The first written mention of Skorošice is from 1290.

During World War II, the German occupiers operated the E168 and E790 forced labour subcamps of the Stalag VIII-B/344 prisoner-of-war camp in the village. Allied POWs of various nationalities including British and French were imprisoned there.

In 1949, the municipality of Petrovice was annexed to Skorošice. In 1976–1990, Skorošice and Petrovice were municipal parts of Žulová.

== Demographics ==
Historical population

Year	Pop.	±%
1869	2,941	—
1880	2,912	−1.0%
1890	2,832	−2.7%
1900	2,790	−1.5%
1910	2,694	−3.4%

Year	Pop.	±%
1921	2,699	+0.2%
1930	2,789	+3.3%
1950	971	−65.2%
1961	907	−6.6%
1970	863	−4.9%

Year	Pop.	±%
1980	785	−9.0%
1991	820	+4.5%
2001	797	−2.8%
2011	739	−7.3%
2021	670	−9.3%

Source: Censuses

== Transport ==
The I/60 road from Jeseník to the Czech–Polish border runs through the municipality.

== Sights ==
The main landmark is the Church of Saint Martin. It was built in the late Empire style, probably on the site of an older church. In the front of the church is a valuable Rococo statue of the Virgin Mary Immaculate.
