= Johann Wadephul =

German politician, Minister of Foreign Affairs of Germany

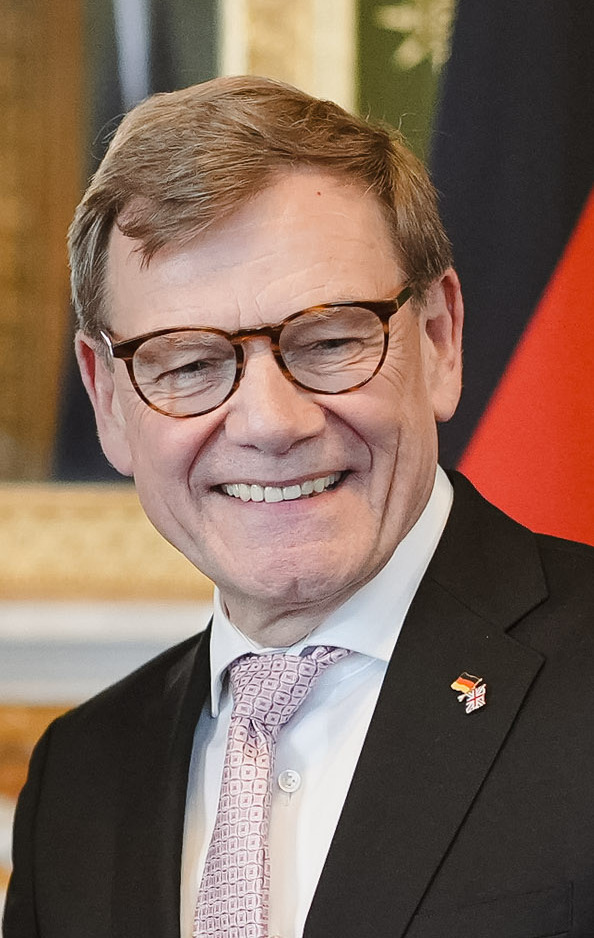
- Wadephul in 2025

Minister for Foreign Affairs
- Incumbent
- Assumed office 6 May 2025
- Chancellor: Friedrich Merz
- Preceded by: Annalena Baerbock

Member of the Bundestag for Rendsburg-Eckernförde
- Incumbent
- Assumed office 27 October 2009
- Preceded by: Otto Bernhardt

Leader of the Christian Democratic Union in the Landtag of Schleswig-Holstein
- In office 27 April 2005 – 29 September 2009
- Preceded by: Peter Harry Carstensen
- Succeeded by: Christian von Boetticher

Member of the Landtag of Schleswig-Holstein
- In office 28 March 2000 – 27 October 2009
- Preceded by: multi-member district
- Succeeded by: multi-member district
- Constituency: Christian Democratic Union list

Personal details
- Born: 10 February 1963 (age 63) Husum, Schleswig-Holstein, West Germany
- Party: Christian Democratic Union (since 1982)
- Children: 3
- Education: Meldorfer Gelehrtenschule
- Alma mater: Kiel University (Dr. iur.)
- Occupation: Lawyer, Politician, Diplomat

Military service
- Allegiance: Germany
- Branch/service: Bundeswehr
- Years of service: 1982–1986
- Rank: Lieutenant colonel (reserves)

Johann David Walter Rudolf Wadephul (German: [ˈjoːhan ˈvaːdəˌfuːl]; born 10 February 1963) is a German politician of the Christian Democratic Union (CDU) who has been serving as the federal minister of foreign affairs in the cabinet of Chancellor Friedrich Merz since 2025.

He has been a member of the Bundestag since 2009, where he also served as deputy chair of the CDU/CSU parliamentary group from 2017 until 2025. Previously, he was a member of the Landtag of Schleswig-Holstein from 2000 until 2009, where he also served as chairman of the CDU parliamentary group from 2005.

== Early life and education ==
Wadephul was born in Husum, Schleswig-Holstein, to teachers Werner and Karin (née Schäfer). He attended primary school in Nordhastedt before attending the Meldorfer Gelehrtenschule gymnasium, where he graduated in 1982. From 1982 to 1986, he served as a reserve officer in the German Air Force at the Rendsburg base. In 1986, he retired as a first lieutenant and later rose to the rank of lieutenant colonel (retired). In 1986, he began studying law at the Christian-Albrechts University of Kiel, completing his studies in 1991 with the First State Examination.

From 1992 to 1993, Wadephul received a scholarship from the Konrad Adenauer Foundation. From 1993 to 1995, he worked as a legal trainee in the Kiel Regional Court. In 1995, he passed his Second State Examination and, in March 1996, earned his doctorate at the University of Kiel under Professor Dieter Reuter with a dissertation entitled Die Vereinbarung der Betriebspartner, transl. the Agreements between Company Partners.

Since 1995, Wadephul has practiced law, initially in Lübeck before establishing his own firm in Neumünster in 2001. He qualified as a specialist lawyer in medical law and social law in 2009, and has since worked with law firms in both Neumünster and Berlin.

== Political career ==
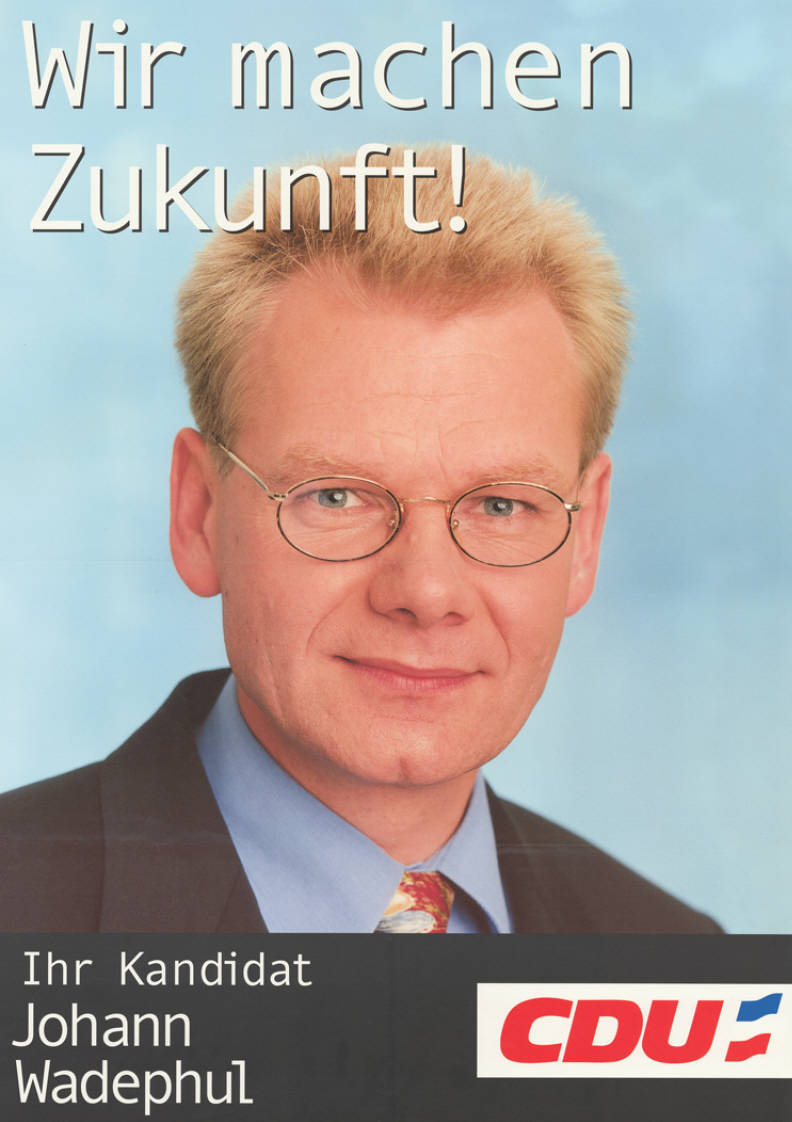
Wadephul on a 2000 election poster

=== Career in state politics ===
Wadephul joined the Christian Democratic Union (CDU) and its youth organization, the Young Union, in 1982.

Starting in 1993, he became part of the CDU leadership in Schleswig-Holstein. From 1997 to 2000, Wadephul served as Secretary General of the CDU in the state under party chairman Peter Kurt Würzbach. He then briefly chaired the CDU in Schleswig-Holstein from 2000 to 2002 before being succeeded by Peter Harry Carstensen. During his tenure as chairman, Wadephul publicly endorsed Edmund Stoiber as the CDU’s candidate to challenge incumbent Chancellor Gerhard Schröder in the 2002 federal elections.

After the 2000 state elections, Wadephul was elected to the Landtag of Schleswig-Holstein. Following the CDU’s victory in the 2005 elections, he succeeded Carstensen as chairman of the CDU parliamentary group. Wadephul chose not to seek re-election in 2009.

=== Member of the German Bundestag, 2009–present ===
Wadephul has been a member of the German Bundestag since the 2009 elections, representing the Rendsburg-Eckernförde district. In 2009, he received 40.2% of the vote in his seat.

Wadephul first served on the Committee on Labour and Social Affairs. In the 2013 elections, Wadephul received an increased 45.2% of the vote. After the election, he became the chairman of the Committee on the Scrutiny of Elections, Immunity and the Rules of Procedure. In addition, he served as member of the Committee on Foreign Affairs and of the parliament's Council of Elders, which – among other duties – determines daily legislative agenda items and assigning committee chairpersons based on party representation.

On the Committee on Foreign Affairs, Wadephul was his parliamentary group's rapporteur on relations with the Middle East, Arab states of the Persian Gulf and Iran. He also covered issues related to Belarus, Ukraine, Russia and the Western Balkans. In addition to his committee assignments, he served as Deputy Chairman of the German-Belarusian Parliamentary Friendship Group.

Following the 2017 elections, Wadephul was re-elected with 42.7% of the vote in his seat. In the negotiations to form a coalition government under the leadership of Chancellor Angela Merkel, Wadephul was part of the working group on foreign policy, led by Ursula von der Leyen, Gerd Müller and Sigmar Gabriel. He has since been serving as deputy chairman of the CDU/CSU parliamentary group under the leadership of successive chairs Volker Kauder (2017–2018), Ralph Brinkhaus (2018–2022) and Friedrich Merz (2022–present); in this capacity, he succeeded Franz Josef Jung.

In addition to his work in parliament, Wadephul has been a member of the German delegation to the Parliamentary Assembly of the Council of Europe (PACE) since 2010. As member of the CDU, he is part of the Group of the European People's Party. Since joining the Assembly, he has served on various committees, including Committee on Legal Affairs and Human Rights, the Committee on Rules of Procedure, Immunities and Institutional Affairs and the Sub-Committee on Ethics. Since 2022, he has also been a member of the German delegation to the NATO Parliamentary Assembly, where he is part of the Political Committee.

For the 2021 election, Wadephul was elected to lead the CDU campaign in Schleswig-Holstein for the fourth consecutive time. While he lost his district of Rendsburg-Eckernförde to the SPD's Sönke Rix, Wadephul was elected on the party list in Schleswig-Holstein. Wadephul received 29.7% of the vote against Rix's 30.8%.

In the 2025 election, Wadephul retook his district of Rendsburg-Eckernförde with 32.8% of the vote.

=== Federal Minister of Foreign Affairs (2025–present) ===
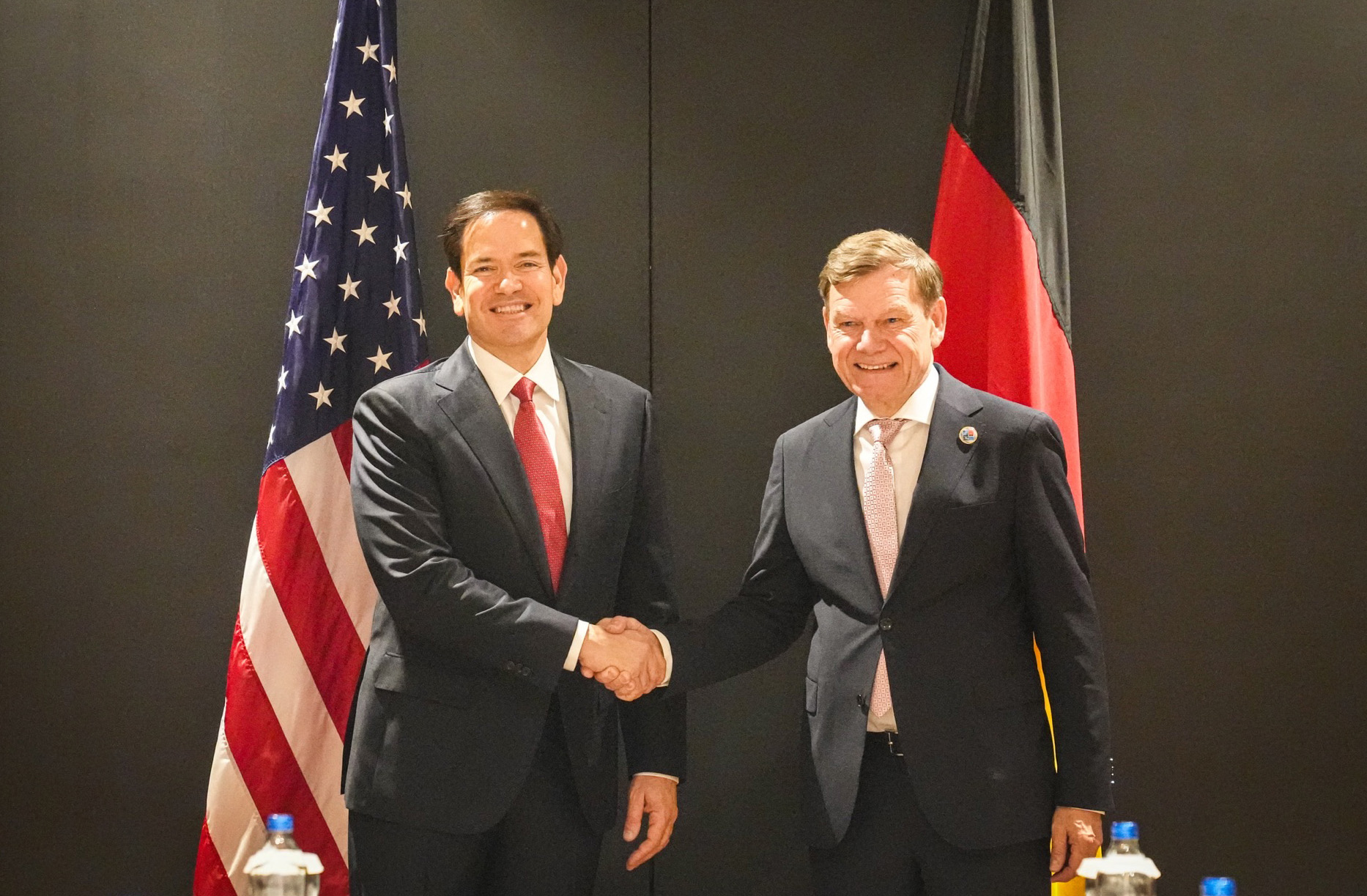
Wadephul with US Secretary of State Marco Rubio in Antalya, Turkey, 15 May 2025

On 6 May 2025, Wadephul was sworn in as foreign minister by President Frank-Walter Steinmeier alongside the rest of the Merz cabinet.

The following day, he accompanied Chancellor Friedrich Merz on his trip to Paris meeting his counter part, French foreign minister Jean-Noël Barrot. Later that day he met with Radosław Sikorski in Warsaw.

During the 2026 Morocco–Spain border incident, Wadephul emphasized the need for close cooperation with Morocco to ensure border security and facilitate the prompt return of undocumented migrants.

== Other activities ==
- European Council on Foreign Relations (ECFR), Member
- German-Arab Friendship Association (DAFG), Member of the Board
- Norddeutscher Rundfunk, Member of the Broadcasting Board
- Hermann Ehlers Foundation, Deputy Chairman of the Board
- Petersburger Dialog, Member of the Board

== Political positions ==
In June 2017, Wadephul voted against his parliamentary group's majority and in favor of Germany's introduction of same-sex marriage.

In 2019, Wadephul joined 14 members of his parliamentary group who, in an open letter, called for the party to rally around Merkel and party chairwoman Annegret Kramp-Karrenbauer against criticism voiced by conservatives Friedrich Merz and Roland Koch.

In April 2020, Wadephul co-signed – alongside around 50 other members of his parliamentary group – a letter to President of the European Commission Ursula von der Leyen which called on the European Union to take in children who were living in migrant camps across Greece.

Ahead of the Christian Democrats' leadership election in 2021, Wadephul publicly endorsed Norbert Röttgen to succeed Annegret Kramp-Karrenbauer as the party's chair.

In a 2023 interview with the German newspaper Tagesspiegel, he advocated that Ukraine be allowed to use the weapons supplied by Germany, among others, on Russian territory.

Wadephul supported the export of German weapons to Israel during the Gaza war. He said that "we must work to ensure that excessive and unjustified criticism of Israel is avoided. This is true of many resolutions in UN bodies that are one-sided against Israel and have a clear anti-Israel, if not anti-Semitic, motivation."

== Taurus leak incident ==
In February 2025 Wadephul was called by the Russian comedy duo Vovan and Lexus, pretending to be employees of the Ukrainian president Volodymyr Zelenskyy. In the 20-minute call, he leaked information about military support and thoughts about the possible delivery of Taurus cruise missiles.

== Personal life ==
Wadephul is married and has three daughters. The family lives in Molfsee.
