= Rendsburg-Eckernförde (electoral district) =

Federal electoral district of Germany

4 Rendsburg-Eckernförde
- Electoral district for the Bundestag
- Rendsburg-Eckernförde in 2025
- State: Schleswig-Holstein
- Population: 252,100 (2019)
- Electorate: 202,226 (2021)
- Major settlements: Rendsburg; Eckernförde
- Area: 2,165.4 km^{2}

Current electoral district
- Created: 1976
- Party: CDU
- Member: Johann Wadephul
- Elected: 2025

Rendsburg-Eckernförde is an electoral constituency (German: Wahlkreis) represented in the German Bundestag. It elects one member via first-past-the-post voting. Under the current constituency numbering system, it is designated as constituency 4. It is located in north central Schleswig-Holstein, comprising almost the entirety of the Rendsburg-Eckernförde district.

Rendsburg-Eckernförde was created for the 1976 federal election. From 2021 to 2025, it was represented by Sönke Rix of the Social Democratic Party (SPD). Since 2025 it has been represented by Johann Wadephul of the CDU.

== Geography ==
Rendsburg-Eckernförde is located in north central Schleswig-Holstein. As of the 2021 federal election, it comprises the entirety of the Rendsburg-Eckernförde district with the exception of the municipalities of Altenholz and Kronshagen, which are part of the Kiel constituency.

== History ==
Rendsburg-Eckernförde was created in 1976 and contained parts of the abolished constituencies of Schleswig – Eckernförde and Rendsburg – Neumünster. Until 2002, it was coterminous with the district of Rendsburg-Eckernförde; in 2002, the municipalities of Altenholz and Kronshagen were transferred to the Kiel constituency.

Election	No.	Name	Borders
1976	4	Rendsburg-Eckernförde	Rendsburg-Eckernförde district
1980	4	Rendsburg-Eckernförde	Rendsburg-Eckernförde district
1983	4	Rendsburg-Eckernförde	Rendsburg-Eckernförde district
1987	4	Rendsburg-Eckernförde	Rendsburg-Eckernförde district
1990	4	Rendsburg-Eckernförde	Rendsburg-Eckernförde district
1994	4	Rendsburg-Eckernförde	Rendsburg-Eckernförde district
1998	4	Rendsburg-Eckernförde	Rendsburg-Eckernförde district
2002	4	Rendsburg-Eckernförde	Rendsburg-Eckernförde district (excluding Altenholz and Kronshagen municipalities)
2005	4	Rendsburg-Eckernförde	Rendsburg-Eckernförde district (excluding Altenholz and Kronshagen municipalities)
2009	4	Rendsburg-Eckernförde	Rendsburg-Eckernförde district (excluding Altenholz and Kronshagen municipalities)
2013	4	Rendsburg-Eckernförde	Rendsburg-Eckernförde district (excluding Altenholz and Kronshagen municipalities)
2017	4	Rendsburg-Eckernförde	Rendsburg-Eckernförde district (excluding Altenholz and Kronshagen municipalities)
2021	4	Rendsburg-Eckernförde	Rendsburg-Eckernförde district (excluding Altenholz and Kronshagen municipalities)
2025	4	Rendsburg-Eckernförde	Rendsburg-Eckernförde district (excluding Altenholz and Kronshagen municipalities)

== Members ==
The constituency was held by the Social Democratic Party (SPD) from its creation in 1976 until 1983, during which time it was represented by future Minister-President of Schleswig-Holstein Heide Simonis. It was won by the Christian Democratic Union (CDU) in 1983, and represented by former Minister-President of Schleswig-Holstein Gerhard Stoltenberg. In 1998, it was won by the SPD's Ulrike Mehl. The CDU's Otto Bernhardt won the constituency in 2005, and represented it for a single term before being succeeded by fellow CDU member Johann Wadephul in 2009. Sönke Rix was elected for the SPD in 2021.

Election	Member	Party	%
1976	Heide Simonis	SPD	47.7
1980	Heide Simonis	SPD	49.8
1983	Gerhard Stoltenberg	CDU	52.4
1987	Gerhard Stoltenberg	CDU	48.7
1990	Gerhard Stoltenberg	CDU	47.4
1994	Gerhard Stoltenberg	CDU	46.9
1998	Ulrike Mehl	SPD	48.8
2002	Ulrike Mehl	SPD	48.1
2005	Otto Bernhardt	CDU	44.1
2009	Johann Wadephul	CDU	40.2
2013	Johann Wadephul	CDU	45.2
2017	Johann Wadephul	CDU	42.7
2021	Sönke Rix	SPD	30.8
2025	Johann Wadephul	CDU	32.8

== Election results ==
=== 2025 election ===
Federal election (2025): Rendsburg-Eckernförde
Notes:	Blue background denotes the winner of the electorate vote. Pink background denotes a candidate elected from their party list. Yellow background denotes an electorate win by a list member, or other incumbent. A ✓ or ✗ denotes status of any incumbent, win or lose respectively.						
Party	Candidate	Votes	%	±%	Party votes	%	±%
CDU	Johann Wadephul	56,163	32.8	▲3.1	50,231	29.3	▲5.3
SPD	Felix Wilsberg	36,266	21.2	▼9.6	30,418	17.7	▼9.1
AfD	Gereon Bollmann	26,417	15.4	▲9.1	27,498	16.0	▲9.5
Greens	Monika Wegener	20,473	11.9	▼2.9	25,226	14.7	▼3.2
SSW	Maylis Roßberg	11,075	6.5	▲2.8	10,500	6.1	▲1.6
Left	Mark Hintz	8,675	5.1	▲2.3	10,887	6.3	▲3.1
FDP	Wolfgang Kubicki	8,170	4.8	▼3.3	7,956	4.6	▼7.4
BSW					5,463	3.2	New
PARTEI					1,161	0.7	▼0.3
FW	Nicole Andres	1,367	0.8	▼0.2	992	0.6	▼0.2
Volt	Christoph Thurner	1,327	0.8	New	974	0.6	▲0.4
Independent	Björn Baasch	500	0.3	New			
Independent	Murat Kisifli	302	0.2	New			
BD	Dieter Schulz	632	0.4	New	298	0.2	New
MLPD					42	<0.1	0.0
Informal votes		1,152			873		
Total valid votes		171,367			171,646		
Turnout		172,519	85.1	▲5.0			
CDU gain from SPD	Majority	19,897	11.6	N/A			

=== 2021 election ===
Federal election (2021): Rendsburg-Eckernförde
Notes:	Blue background denotes the winner of the electorate vote. Pink background denotes a candidate elected from their party list. Yellow background denotes an electorate win by a list member, or other incumbent. A ✓ or ✗ denotes status of any incumbent, win or lose respectively.						
Party	Candidate	Votes	%	±%	Party votes	%	±%
SPD	Sönke Rix	49,474	30.8	▲1.9	43,148	26.8	▲3.9
CDU	✗ Johann Wadephul	47,688	29.7	▼13.0	38,517	23.9	▼12.3
Greens	Jakob Blasel	23,832	14.8	▲5.9	28,828	17.9	▲5.5
FDP	Christine Aschenberg-Dugnus	12,903	8.0	▲1.6	19,322	12.0	▼0.2
AfD	Gereon Bollmann	10,200	6.3	▼0.5	10,564	6.6	▼0.8
SSW	Maylis Roßberg	5,834	3.6		7,304	4.5	
Left	Hauke Schultze	4,416	2.7	▼2.4	5,163	3.2	▼3.2
dieBasis	Holger Thiesen	2,502	1.6		2,375	1.5	
Tierschutzpartei					1,728	1.1	
PARTEI	Nils-H. Saul	2,150	1.3		1,618	1.0	▼0.1
FW	Bärbel Kahlund	1,651	1.0	0.0	1,174	0.7	▲0.1
Volt					253	0.2	
Team Todenhöfer					244	0.2	
NPD					158	0.1	▼0.1
Humanists					136	0.1	
V-Partei3					127	0.1	
ÖDP					122	0.1	▼0.1
du.					69	0.1	
LKR					49	0.0	
MLPD					33	0.0	0.0
DKP					23	0.0	
Informal votes		1,410			1,105		
Total valid votes		160,650			160,955		
Turnout		162,060	80.1	▲1.8			
SPD gain from CDU	Majority	1,786	1.1				

=== 2017 election ===
Federal election (2017): Rendsburg-Eckernförde
Notes:	Blue background denotes the winner of the electorate vote. Pink background denotes a candidate elected from their party list. Yellow background denotes an electorate win by a list member, or other incumbent. A ✓ or ✗ denotes status of any incumbent, win or lose respectively.						
Party	Candidate	Votes	%	±%	Party votes	%	±%
CDU	✓ Johann Wadephul	66,625	42.7	▼2.5	56,585	36.2	▼4.6
SPD	Sönke Rix	45,070	28.9	▼7.9	35,766	22.9	▼8.6
Greens	Claudia Ulrich	13,978	9.0	▲2.0	19,337	12.4	▲3.1
AfD	Gereon Bollmann	10,656	6.8	▲3.4	11,578	7.4	▲3.0
FDP	Christine Aschenberg-Dugnus	10,077	6.5	▲4.6	19,071	12.2	▲6.7
Left	Stefan Karstens	8,074	5.2	▲1.9	9,962	6.4	▲2.0
PARTEI					1,754	1.1	
FW	Hans-Werner Last	1,622	1.0		1,031	0.7	▲0.2
BGE					584	0.4	
NPD					307	0.2	▼0.4
ÖDP					237	0.2	
MLPD					55	0.0	0.0
Informal votes		1,252			1,087		
Total valid votes		156,102			156,267		
Turnout		157,354	78.4	▲3.1			
CDU hold	Majority	21,555	13.8	▲5.4			

=== 2013 election ===
Federal election (2013): Rendsburg-Eckernförde
Notes:	Blue background denotes the winner of the electorate vote. Pink background denotes a candidate elected from their party list. Yellow background denotes an electorate win by a list member, or other incumbent. A ✓ or ✗ denotes status of any incumbent, win or lose respectively.						
Party	Candidate	Votes	%	±%	Party votes	%	±%
CDU	✓ Johann Wadephul	66,775	45.2	▲5.0	60,349	40.8	▲6.9
SPD	Sönke Rix	54,397	36.8	▲4.3	46,658	31.5	▲4.8
Greens	Detlef Matthiessen	10,306	7.0	▼3.1	13,707	9.3	▼3.5
AfD	Briga Friederike Krikau	5,084	3.4		6,500	4.4	
Left	Stefan Karstens	4,902	3.3	▼2.6	6,447	4.4	▼2.3
Pirates	Anne Burmeister	2,756	1.9		2,620	1.8	▼0.3
FDP	Christine Aschenberg-Dugnus	2,754	1.9	▼7.9	8,126	5.5	▼10.5
Tierschutzpartei					1,290	0.9	
NPD	Rudolf Reinhard Rosenthal	866	0.6	▼0.3	854	0.6	▼0.3
FW					716	0.5	
Rentner					668	0.5	▼0.6
MLPD					32	0.0	0.0
Informal votes		1,743			1,616		
Total valid votes		147,840			147,967		
Turnout		149,583	75.2	▼0.2			
CDU hold	Majority	12,378	8.4	▲0.7			

=== 2009 election ===
Federal election (2009): Rendsburg-Eckernförde
Notes:	Blue background denotes the winner of the electorate vote. Pink background denotes a candidate elected from their party list. Yellow background denotes an electorate win by a list member, or other incumbent. A ✓ or ✗ denotes status of any incumbent, win or lose respectively.						
Party	Candidate	Votes	%	±%	Party votes	%	±%
CDU	Johann Wadephul	58,876	40.2	▼3.9	49,789	33.9	▼4.2
SPD	Sönke Rix	47,610	32.5	▼11.2	39,253	26.7	▼10.9
Greens	Detlef Matthiessen	14,790	10.1	▲6.2	18,751	12.8	▲4.7
FDP	Christine Aschenberg-Dugnus	14,317	9.8	▲6.2	23,442	15.9	▲6.1
Left	Stefan Karstens	8,729	6.0	▲2.7	9,821	6.7	▲2.5
Pirates					2,985	2.0	
Rentner					1,540	1.0	
NPD	Kevin Stein	1,344	0.9	0.0	1,220	0.8	▼0.1
Independent	Holger Thiesen	948	0.6				
DVU					136	0.1	
MLPD					55	0.0	0.0
Informal votes		3,404			3,026		
Total valid votes		146,614			146,992		
Turnout		150,018	75.4	▼5.1			
CDU hold	Majority	11,266	7.7	▲7.3			

=== 2005 election ===
Federal election (2005): Rendsburg-Eckernförde
Notes:	Blue background denotes the winner of the electorate vote. Pink background denotes a candidate elected from their party list. Yellow background denotes an electorate win by a list member, or other incumbent. A ✓ or ✗ denotes status of any incumbent, win or lose respectively.						
Party	Candidate	Votes	%	±%	Party votes	%	±%
CDU	Otto Bernhardt	69,082	44.1	▲3.7	59,743	38.1	▲0.8
SPD	Sönke Rix	68,480	43.7	▼4.4	59,001	37.6	▼5.0
Greens	Henning Willers	6,164	3.9	▼0.4	12,613	8.0	▼1.0
FDP	Christine Aschenberg-Dugnus	5,607	3.6	▼1.5	15,507	9.9	▲1.9
Left	Gernot Kaempfe	5,106	3.3	▲2.2	6,522	4.2	▲3.0
Familie					1,835	1.2	
NPD	Jens Görtzen	1,454	0.9		1,457	0.9	▲0.7
Independent	Holger Thiesen	761	0.5	▼0.2			
MLPD					101	0.1	
Informal votes		2,187			2,062		
Total valid votes		156,654			156,779		
Turnout		158,841	80.5	▼1.2			
CDU gain from SPD	Majority	602	0.4				

=== 2002 election ===
Federal election (2002): Rendsburg-Eckernförde
Notes:	Blue background denotes the winner of the electorate vote. Pink background denotes a candidate elected from their party list. Yellow background denotes an electorate win by a list member, or other incumbent. A ✓ or ✗ denotes status of any incumbent, win or lose respectively.						
Party	Candidate	Votes	%	±%	Party votes	%	±%
SPD	✓ Ulrike Mehl	75,617	48.1	▼1.1	67,218	42.6	▼2.3
CDU	Otto Bernhardt	63,594	40.4	▼1.6	58,861	37.3	▲0.8
FDP	Christine Aschenberg-Dugnus	8,039	5.1	▲2.4	12,665	8.0	▲0.1
Greens	Detlef Matthiessen	6,788	4.3	▲1.0	14,189	9.0	▲2.8
Schill					1,660	1.1	New
PDS	Gernot Fights	1,608	1.0	▲0.1	1,839	1.2	▼0.1
Independent	Holger Thiesen	1,043	0.7				
PBC	Stefan Höpken	545	0.3		381	0.2	
Die Heimat					374	0.2	▲0.1
GRAUEN					353	0.2	▼0.1
REP					173	0.1	▼0.1
Informal votes		2,177			1,698		
Total valid votes		157,234			157,713		
Turnout		159,411	81.7	▼1.7			
SPD hold	Majority	12,023	7.7				
