= Jakob Blasel =

German climate activist (born 2000)

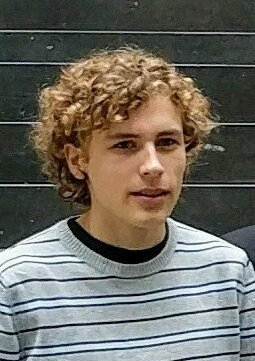
- Blasel in 2019
- Born: 16 October 2000 (age 25); Kiel, Germany
- Known for: School strike for climate
- Political party: German: Alliance 90/The Greens; EU: European Green Party

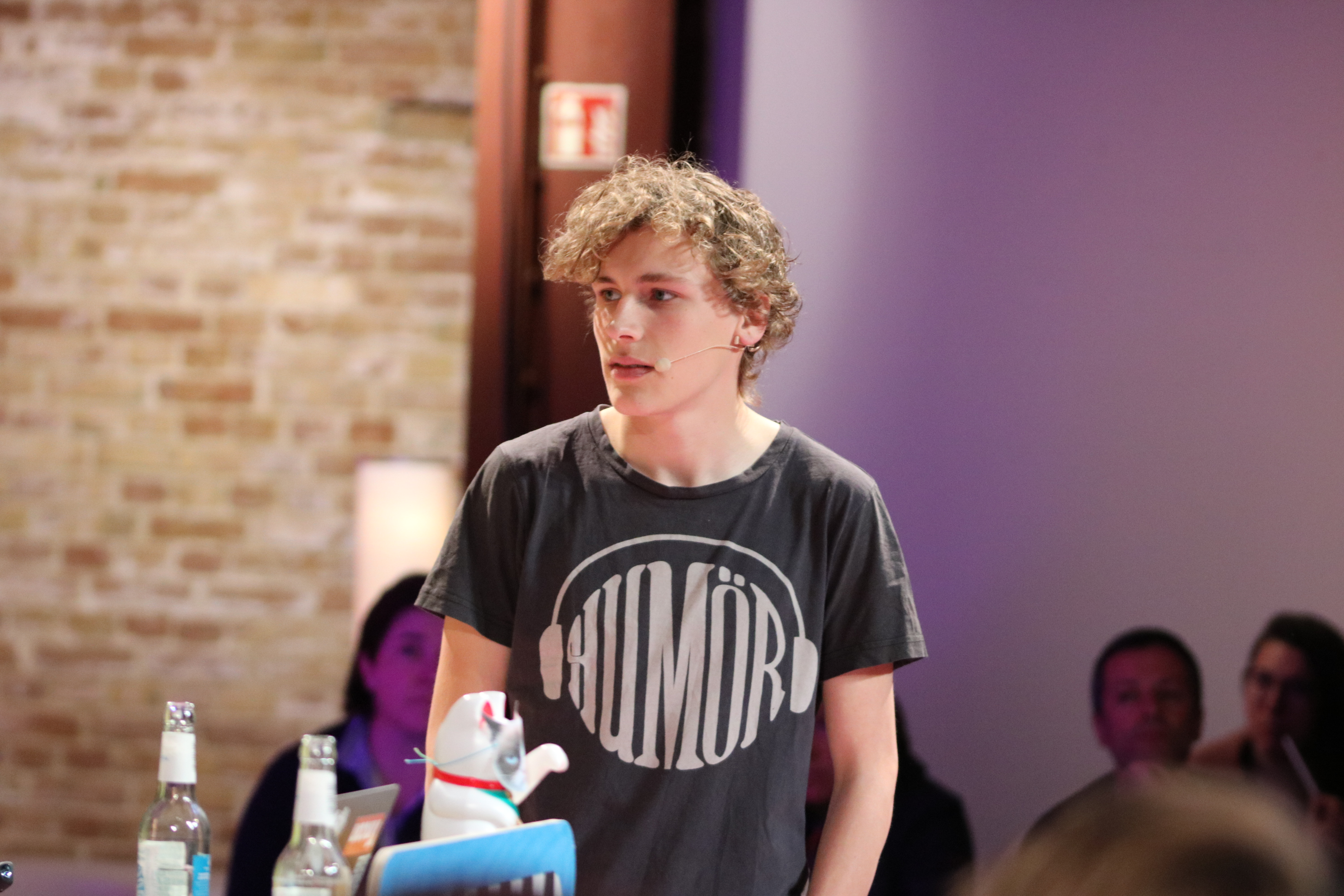
Blasel at the re:publica 2019

Jakob Blasel (born 2000) is a German climate activist and politician of Alliance 90/The Greens.

== Life ==
Jakob Blasel grew up in Kronshagen near Kiel. He has two younger brothers and was raised Catholic. He attended high school in Kronshagen, where he was deputy student representative in the 2017/18 school year, and graduated from high school there in 2019. He has been studying law since the 2020/21 winter semester.

=== Friday for Future ===
Jakob Blasel was part of the organizing team of the German section of Fridays For Future (FFF) from 10 December 2018. According to Greenpeace, on the first nationwide FFF climate strike on 14 December 2018, Blasel and his comrades-in-arms managed to mobilize 500 participants in Kiel – 200 more than in Berlin. Blasel was elected as a delegate of the local group in Kiel and represents their positions in the nationwide and international exchange of the movement. In 2019 Jakob Blasel took part in the summer congress of FFF in Dortmund.

Blasel has appeared on talk shows such as the NDR Talk Show (2019) and Maischberger. die woche (2020) and gave media interviews, e.g. B. with Bento (2019), Deutschlandfunk Kultur (2019) and Süddeutsche Zeitung (2019). He also appeared in two reports on the German funk program Y-Kollektiv in 2019 and 2021. At the state party conference of the Green Party in Schleswig-Holstein, which took place on 23 and 24 March 2019, he gave a speech as a representative of Fridays for Future. At the Golden Camera ceremony on 30 March 2019 in Berlin, he accompanied Greta Thunberg when she received the special prize for climate protection. After graduating from high school in 2019, Blasel worked full-time for Fridays for Future for a year and acted as speaker until July 2020.

=== Commitment besides FFF ===
In 2017, Blasel joined the Greenpeace youth. Blasel was one of the initiators of the 19th annual conference of the Council for Sustainable Development, which took place on 4 June 2019 in the Berlin Congress Center. From 2019 onwards Jakob Blasel, Pia Kraftfutter and Fabian Grischkat moderated the Instagram format "OZON" produced by Divimove, which deals with sustainability and environmental protection and is part of the online media offer funk of ARD and ZDF, however, was later replaced by YouTuber Violetta Verissimo.

In 2019, Blasel demanded in a broadcast of OZON, which he moderated at the time, that it should be "forbidden to breed animals unnecessarily". He claimed pets were "quite a luxury with regard to the environmental and CO_{2} impact". There was no indication in the program that he was an FFF activist. After he was elected federal spokesperson for the Greens in 2024, his call for a ban was widely criticized. The hosting public broadcasting agency and the Greens then denied that Blasel ever demanded that breeding of pets be forbidden, and the OZON episode disappeared from the ZDF's online catalog without notice.

In mid-June 2022, Blasel was active as a FahrRad! ambassador for the Verkehrsclub Deutschland (VCD) at a comprehensive school in Berlin.

=== Political career ===
Blasel grew up in Kronshagen and joined the Green Party in 2017.

Blasel organized the first demonstration in Kiel in the fall of 2018; it was about preserving the Hambach Forest in North Rhine-Westphalia, which was to be cleared for lignite mining. Shortly after, he became the initiator of the first school strike for climate in Northern Germany. In May 2019, he addressed the ESA's Living Planet Symposium in Milan.

In 2020, Blasel completed an internship at the parliamentary office of Lisa Badum. Ahead of the 2021 national elections, he was nominated by the Green Party as a candidate for the Rendsburg-Eckernförde district in Schleswig-Holstein. He won 14.8% of first preference votes, coming third behind Sönke Rix, the SPD candidate, and Johann Wadephul, the CDU candidate.

After the federal board of the Young Greens in Germany announced its joint resignation in 2024, Blasel announced he would run as federal spokesperson for the youth wing of the party. He was elected to the position from October 2024 to October 2025 with a vote share of 74,6 %. After the conservative CDU/CSU alliance in the Bundestag pushed through a motion to strictly limit migration with votes from the far-right Alternative for Germany in 2025, Blasel called for the rejection of a potential coalition with the CDU/CSU in the next legislative period by his own Green Party.
