= Oberallgäu (electoral district) =

Federal electoral district of Germany

256 Oberallgäu
- Electoral district for the Bundestag
- Oberallgäu in 2025
- State: Bavaria
- Population: 307,100 (2019)
- Electorate: 227,116 (2025)
- Major settlements: Kempten; Lindau; Sonthofen
- Area: 1,914.6 km^{2}

Current electoral district
- Created: 1949
- Party: CSU
- Member: Mechthilde Wittmann
- Elected: 2021, 2025

Oberallgäu is an electoral constituency (German: Wahlkreis) represented in the Bundestag. It elects one member via first-past-the-post voting. Under the current constituency numbering system, it is designated as constituency 256. It is located in southwestern Bavaria, comprising the city of Kempten and the districts of Lindau and Oberallgäu.

Oberallgäu was created for the inaugural 1949 federal election. Since 2021, it has been represented by Mechthilde Wittmann of the Christian Social Union (CSU).

== Geography ==
Oberallgäu is located in southwestern Bavaria. As of the 2021 federal election, it comprises the independent city of Kempten and the districts of Lindau and Oberallgäu.

== History ==
Oberallgäu was created in 1949, then known as Kempten. It acquired its current name in the 1976 election. In the 1949 election, it was Bavaria constituency 46 in the numbering system. In the 1953 through 1961 elections, it was number 241. In the 1965 through 1972 elections, it was number 243. In the 1976 through 1998 elections, it was number 242. In the 2002 and 2005 elections, it was number 257. Since the 2009 election, it has been number 256.

Originally, the constituency comprised the independent cities of Kempten and Lindau and the districts of Landkreis Kempten, Landkreis Lindau, and Sonthofen. In the 1965 through 1972 elections, it also contained the district of Füssen. It acquired its current borders in the 1976 election.

Election	No.	Name	Borders
1949	46	Kempten	Kempten city; Lindau city; Landkreis Kempten district; Landkreis Lindau district; Sonthofen district
1953	241	Kempten	Kempten city; Lindau city; Landkreis Kempten district; Landkreis Lindau district; Sonthofen district
1957	241	Kempten	Kempten city; Lindau city; Landkreis Kempten district; Landkreis Lindau district; Sonthofen district
1961	241	Kempten	Kempten city; Lindau city; Landkreis Kempten district; Landkreis Lindau district; Sonthofen district
1965	243	Kempten	Kempten city; Lindau city; Landkreis Kempten district; Landkreis Lindau district; Sonthofen district; Füssen district
1969	243	Kempten	Kempten city; Lindau city; Landkreis Kempten district; Landkreis Lindau district; Sonthofen district; Füssen district
1972	243	Kempten	Kempten city; Lindau city; Landkreis Kempten district; Landkreis Lindau district; Sonthofen district; Füssen district
1976	242	Oberallgäu	Kempten city; Lindau district; Oberallgäu district
1980	242	Oberallgäu	Kempten city; Lindau district; Oberallgäu district
1983	242	Oberallgäu	Kempten city; Lindau district; Oberallgäu district
1987	242	Oberallgäu	Kempten city; Lindau district; Oberallgäu district
1990	242	Oberallgäu	Kempten city; Lindau district; Oberallgäu district
1994	242	Oberallgäu	Kempten city; Lindau district; Oberallgäu district
1998	242	Oberallgäu	Kempten city; Lindau district; Oberallgäu district
2002	257	Oberallgäu	Kempten city; Lindau district; Oberallgäu district
2005	257	Oberallgäu	Kempten city; Lindau district; Oberallgäu district
2009	256	Oberallgäu	Kempten city; Lindau district; Oberallgäu district
2013	256	Oberallgäu	Kempten city; Lindau district; Oberallgäu district
2017	256	Oberallgäu	Kempten city; Lindau district; Oberallgäu district
2021	256	Oberallgäu	Kempten city; Lindau district; Oberallgäu district
2025	256	Oberallgäu	Kempten city; Lindau district; Oberallgäu district

== Members ==
Like most constituencies in rural Bavaria, it is an CSU safe seat, the party holding the seat continuously since its creation. It was first represented by Karl von Spreti from 1949 to 1957, followed by [[Georg Krug|Georg Krug]] from 1957 to 1969 and [[Wolfgang Pohle|Wolfgang Pohle]] from 1969 to 1972. Ignaz Kiechle was representative from 1972 to 1994. Gerd Müller was elected in 1994 and served until 2021. He was succeeded by Mechthilde Wittmann in 2021, who was re-elected in 2025.

Election	Member	Party	%
1949	Karl von Spreti	CSU	43.5
1953	Karl von Spreti	CSU	61.7
1957	Georg Krug	CSU	64.3
1961	Georg Krug	CSU	56.1
1965	Georg Krug	CSU	59.1
1969	Wolfgang Pohle	CSU	58.2
1972	Ignaz Kiechle	CSU	58.6
1976	Ignaz Kiechle	CSU	62.5
1980	Ignaz Kiechle	CSU	60.9
1983	Ignaz Kiechle	CSU	65.4
1987	Ignaz Kiechle	CSU	62.9
1990	Ignaz Kiechle	CSU	58.1
1994	Gerd Müller	CSU	57.7
1998	Gerd Müller	CSU	56.4
2002	Gerd Müller	CSU	64.8
2005	Gerd Müller	CSU	61.5
2009	Gerd Müller	CSU	53.0
2013	Gerd Müller	CSU	60.7
2017	Gerd Müller	CSU	50.4
2021	Mechthilde Wittmann	CSU	29.7
2025	Mechthilde Wittmann	CSU	36.8

== Election results ==
=== 2025 election ===
Federal election (2025): Oberallgäu
Notes:	Blue background denotes the winner of the electorate vote. Pink background denotes a candidate elected from their party list. Yellow background denotes an electorate win by a list member, or other incumbent. A ✓ or ✗ denotes status of any incumbent, win or lose respectively.						
Party	Candidate	Votes	%	±%	Party votes	%	±%
CSU	✓ Mechthilde Wittmann	70,228	36.8	▲7.1	72,528	38.0	▲7.5
AfD	Dr. Rainer Rothfuß	31,804	16.7	▲8.6	33,444	17.5	▲9.6
Greens	Andrea Wörle	23,667	12.4	▼3.0	23,602	12.4	▼2.8
FW	Indra Anja Baier-Müller	16,474	8.6	▼0.3	9,775	5.1	▼3.2
SPD	Konstantin Plappert	16,061	8.4	▼7.3	20,116	10.5	▼6.0
partyless1968	Marc Alexander Wenz	9,779	5.1				
FDP	Stephan Thomae	8,116	4.3	▼8.8	8,216	4.3	▼7.3
Left	Gabriel Bruckdorfer	7,461	3.9	▲1.2	10,016	5.2	▲2.5
BSW					6,280	3.3	
APT	Christoph Meiler	2,980	1.6		1,825	1.0	▼0.1
Volt	Daniel Torsten Maier	2,205	1.2		1,431	0.7	▲0.6
dieBasis					1,225	0.6	▼2.2
ÖDP	Franz Josef Natterer-Babych	1,559	0.8	▼0.4	988	0.5	▼0.2
PARTEI					894	0.5	▼0.3
BP					287	0.2	▼0.1
BD					206	0.1	
Citizens for Justice	Alfred Dorn	375	0.2				
Humanists					110	0.1	Steady
MLPD					45	0.0	Steady
Informal votes		999			720		
Total valid votes		190,709			190,988		
Turnout		191,708	84.4	▲5.0			
CSU hold	Majority	38,424	20.1	▲6.2			

=== 2021 election ===
Federal election (2021): Oberallgäu
Notes:	Blue background denotes the winner of the electorate vote. Pink background denotes a candidate elected from their party list. Yellow background denotes an electorate win by a list member, or other incumbent. A ✓ or ✗ denotes status of any incumbent, win or lose respectively.						
Party	Candidate	Votes	%	±%	Party votes	%	±%
CSU	Mechthilde Wittmann	53,566	29.7	▼20.7	55,017	30.4	▼11.1
SPD	Martin Holderied	28,401	15.8	▲3.5	29,910	16.5	▲4.2
Greens	Pius Bandte	27,817	15.4	▲6.2	27,393	15.2	▲3.9
FDP	Stephan Thomae	23,604	13.1	▲6.1	20,953	11.6	▲0.8
FW	Annette Hauser-Felberbaum	16,181	9.0	▲4.5	14,970	8.3	▲5.3
AfD	Rainer Rothfuß	14,473	8.0	▼1.6	14,350	7.9	▼2.6
dieBasis	Dietrich Busacker	5,508	3.1		5,209	2.9	
Left	Engelbert Blessing	4,911	2.7	▼2.0	5,043	2.8	▼3.0
Tierschutzpartei					1,959	1.1	▲0.2
PARTEI	Tommy Schwellinger	2,269	1.3		1,371	0.8	▲0.2
ÖDP	Franz Natterer-Babych	2,233	1.2	0.0	1,253	0.7	▼0.2
BP					519	0.3	▼0.4
Pirates					515	0.3	0.0
Team Todenhöfer					476	0.3	
Volt					357	0.2	
V-Partei3	Marcel Frey	731	0.4		306	0.2	0.0
Independent	Alfred Dorn	444	0.2				
Unabhängige					285	0.2	
Bündnis C					186	0.1	
Gesundheitsforschung					184	0.1	0.0
Humanists					136	0.1	
du.					104	0.1	
NPD					94	0.1	▼0.2
The III. Path					76	0.0	
DKP					30	0.0	0.0
LKR					30	0.0	
MLPD					15	0.0	0.0
Informal votes		1,617			1,014		
Total valid votes		180,138			180,741		
Turnout		181,755	79.4	▲1.6			
CSU hold	Majority	25,165	13.9	▼24.2			

=== 2017 election ===
Federal election (2017): Oberallgäu
Notes:	Blue background denotes the winner of the electorate vote. Pink background denotes a candidate elected from their party list. Yellow background denotes an electorate win by a list member, or other incumbent. A ✓ or ✗ denotes status of any incumbent, win or lose respectively.						
Party	Candidate	Votes	%	±%	Party votes	%	±%
CSU	✓ Gerd Müller	88,357	50.4	▼10.2	72,855	41.5	▼10.8
SPD	Katharina Schrader	21,451	12.2	▼5.1	21,725	12.4	▼3.6
AfD	Peter Felser	16,825	9.6		18,529	10.6	▲6.2
Greens	Erna-Kathrein Groll	16,162	9.2	▲0.8	19,792	11.3	▲2.0
FDP	Stephan Thomae	12,262	7.0	▲3.4	18,935	10.8	▲5.1
Left	Franz Xaver Merk	8,264	4.7	▲1.1	10,130	5.8	▲2.2
FW	Hugo Wirthensohn	7,805	4.5		5,156	2.9	▲0.4
ÖDP	Lucia Fischer	2,233	1.3	▼1.4	1,607	0.9	▼0.4
BP	Josef Kirchmann	1,838	1.0		1,289	0.7	▲0.1
PARTEI					929	0.5	
Pirates					577	0.3	▼1.2
BGE					559	0.3	
DM					431	0.2	
NPD					365	0.2	▼0.3
V-Partei³					326	0.2	
DiB					229	0.1	
Gesundheitsforschung					211	0.1	
MLPD					40	0.0	0.0
BüSo					28	0.0	0.0
DKP					18	0.0	
Informal votes		1,240			1,092		
Total valid votes		175,197			175,345		
Turnout		176,437	77.9	▲8.5			
CSU hold	Majority	66,906	38.2	▼5.2			

=== 2013 election ===
Federal election (2013): Oberallgäu
Notes:	Blue background denotes the winner of the electorate vote. Pink background denotes a candidate elected from their party list. Yellow background denotes an electorate win by a list member, or other incumbent. A ✓ or ✗ denotes status of any incumbent, win or lose respectively.						
Party	Candidate	Votes	%	±%	Party votes	%	±%
CSU	✓ Gerd Müller	93,494	60.7	▲7.6	80,902	52.3	▲7.5
SPD	Katharina Schrader	26,722	17.3	▲5.2	24,776	16.0	▲3.1
Greens	Michael Schropp	13,011	8.4	▼4.4	14,329	9.3	▼2.0
Left	Stefan Albanesi	5,530	3.6	▼1.4	5,574	3.6	▼1.9
FDP	Stephan Thomae	5,501	3.6	▼7.6	8,749	5.7	▼10.9
AfD					6,695	4.3	
FW					3,918	2.5	
ÖDP	Wilhelm Vachenauer	4,127	2.7	▲0.7	2,089	1.4	▼0.1
Pirates	Ralph Osterkamp	3,072	2.0		2,431	1.6	▼0.1
Tierschutzpartei					1,201	0.8	▲0.1
REP	Ludwig Streitle	2,236	1.5	▲0.1	1,052	0.7	▼0.5
BP					976	0.6	▼0.3
NPD					861	0.6	▼0.2
DIE FRAUEN					290	0.2	
DIE VIOLETTEN					230	0.1	▼0.1
RRP	Maximilian Schönberger	411	0.3		161	0.1	▼0.5
Party of Reason					153	0.1	
PRO					99	0.1	
MLPD					35	0.0	0.0
BüSo					30	0.0	0.0
Informal votes		1,531			1,084		
Total valid votes		154,104			154,551		
Turnout		155,635	69.4	▼2.3			
CSU hold	Majority	66,772	43.4	▲3.2			

=== 2009 election ===
Federal election (2009): Oberallgäu
Notes:	Blue background denotes the winner of the electorate vote. Pink background denotes a candidate elected from their party list. Yellow background denotes an electorate win by a list member, or other incumbent. A ✓ or ✗ denotes status of any incumbent, win or lose respectively.						
Party	Candidate	Votes	%	±%	Party votes	%	±%
CSU	✓ Gerd Müller	83,181	53.0	▼8.5	70,559	44.9	▼8.1
Greens	Thomas Hartmann	20,093	12.8	▲4.4	17,753	11.3	▲3.1
SPD	Reinhard Strehlke	19,107	12.2	▼8.3	20,392	13.0	▼8.0
FDP	Stephan Thomae	17,464	11.1	▲5.8	26,018	16.5	▲5.7
Left	Stefan Albanesi	7,842	5.0	▲2.2	8,735	5.6	▲2.6
Pirates					2,635	1.7	
ÖDP	Wilhelm Vachenauer	3,150	2.0		2,299	1.5	
BP	Josef Kirchmann	2,606	1.7		1,507	1.0	▲0.5
REP	Konrad Huber	2,092	1.3		1,800	1.1	▲0.1
NPD	Alexander Kreidemann	1,314	0.8	▼0.5	1,202	0.8	▼0.1
FAMILIE					1,200	0.8	▼0.1
Tierschutzpartei					1,039	0.7	
RRP					983	0.6	
CM					357	0.2	
DIE VIOLETTEN					353	0.2	
PBC					242	0.2	▼0.1
DVU					71	0.0	
BüSo					53	0.0	0.0
MLPD					41	0.0	0.0
Informal votes		2,008			1,618		
Total valid votes		156,849			157,239		
Turnout		158,857	71.7	▼6.5			
CSU hold	Majority	63,088	40.2	▼0.8			

=== 2005 election ===
Federal election (2005):Oberallgäu
Notes:	Blue background denotes the winner of the electorate vote. Pink background denotes a candidate elected from their party list. Yellow background denotes an electorate win by a list member, or other incumbent. A ✓ or ✗ denotes status of any incumbent, win or lose respectively.						
Party	Candidate	Votes	%	±%	Party votes	%	±%
CSU	✓ Gerd Müller	103,030	61.5	▼3.2	88,875	52.9	▼7.9
SPD	Reinhard Strehlke	34,349	20.5	▼2.1	35,163	20.9	▼1.9
Greens	Thomas Gehring	14,162	8.5	▲0.8	13,712	8.2	▲0.6
FDP	Stephan Thomae	8,943	5.3	▲0.4	18,144	10.8	▲5.5
Left	Markus Högg	4,707	2.8		5,030	3.0	▲2.4
NPD	Alexander Kreidemann	2,212	1.3		1,404	0.8	▲0.7
REP					1,747	1.0	▲0.2
Familie					1,425	0.8	
BP					705	0.4	▲0.3
GRAUEN					609	0.4	▲0.2
PBC					477	0.3	▲0.2
Feminist					463	0.3	▲0.1
BüSo					103	0.1	0.0
MLPD					73	0.1	
Informal votes		2,240			1,713		
Total valid votes		167,403			167,930		
Turnout		169,643	78.1	▼2.9			
CSU hold	Majority	68,681	41				
