= Mechthilde Wittmann =

German politician

Mechthilde Wittmann MdB

Member of the Bundestag; for Oberallgäu
- Incumbent
- Assumed office 26 October 2021
- Preceded by: Gerd Müller

Member of the Landtag of Bavaria; for Upper Bavaria
- In office 8 October 2013 – 5 November 2018

Personal details
- Born: 12 December 1967 (age 58) Munich, West Germany
- Party: Christian Social Union
- Children: 2
- Parent: Fritz Wittmann (father)
- Education: TU Munich; LMU Munich

Mechthilde Wittmann (born 12 December 1967) is a German lawyer and politician of the Christian Social Union in Bavaria (CSU) who has been serving as a member of the Bundestag since 2021.

== Early life and education ==
Wittmann was born 1967 in Munich and the daughter of politician Fritz Wittmann. She studied mechanical engineering at the Technical University of Munich and law at LMU Munich.

== Political career ==
Wittmann joined the CSU in 1983.

Wittmann was a member of the State Parliament of Bavaria 2013 to 2018, where she served on the Committee on Legal Affairs.

Wittmann became a member of the Bundestag in the 2021 elections, representing the Oberallgäu district. In parliament, she serves on the Committee on Internal Affairs and the Committee on Tourism. She is also one of the parliament's two representatives on the Europol Joint Parliamentary Scrutiny Group.

== Other activities ==
- Institute for Federal Real Estate (BImA), Member of the Supervisory Board (since 2025)
- Kempten University of Applied Sciences, Member of the Board of Trustees (since 2022)
