= 2000 Schleswig-Holstein state election =

German state election

← 1996	27 February 2000	2005 →

All 89 seats in the Landtag of Schleswig-Holstein 45 seats needed for a majority
- Turnout: 1,464,096 (69.5%) ▼2.3%
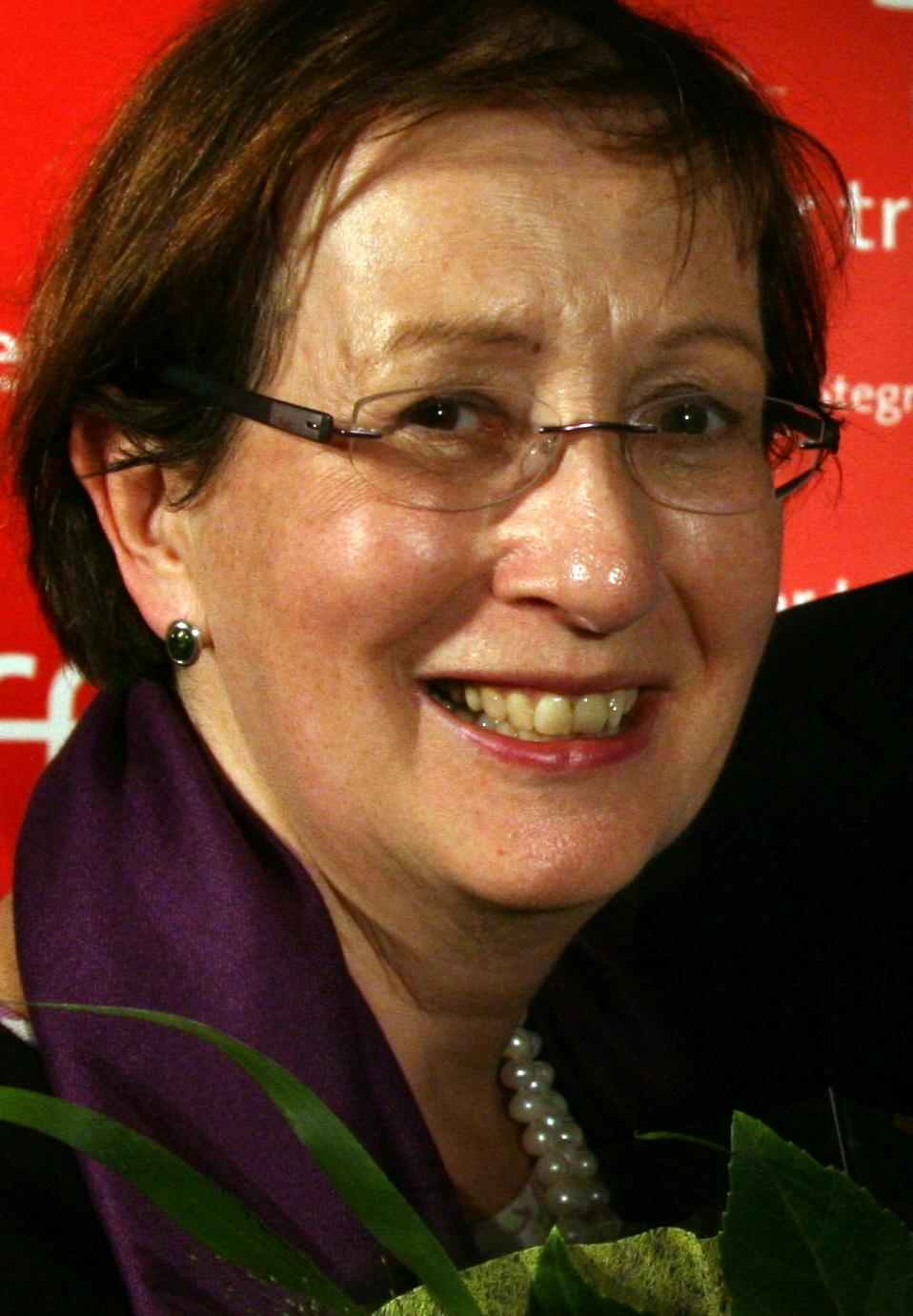

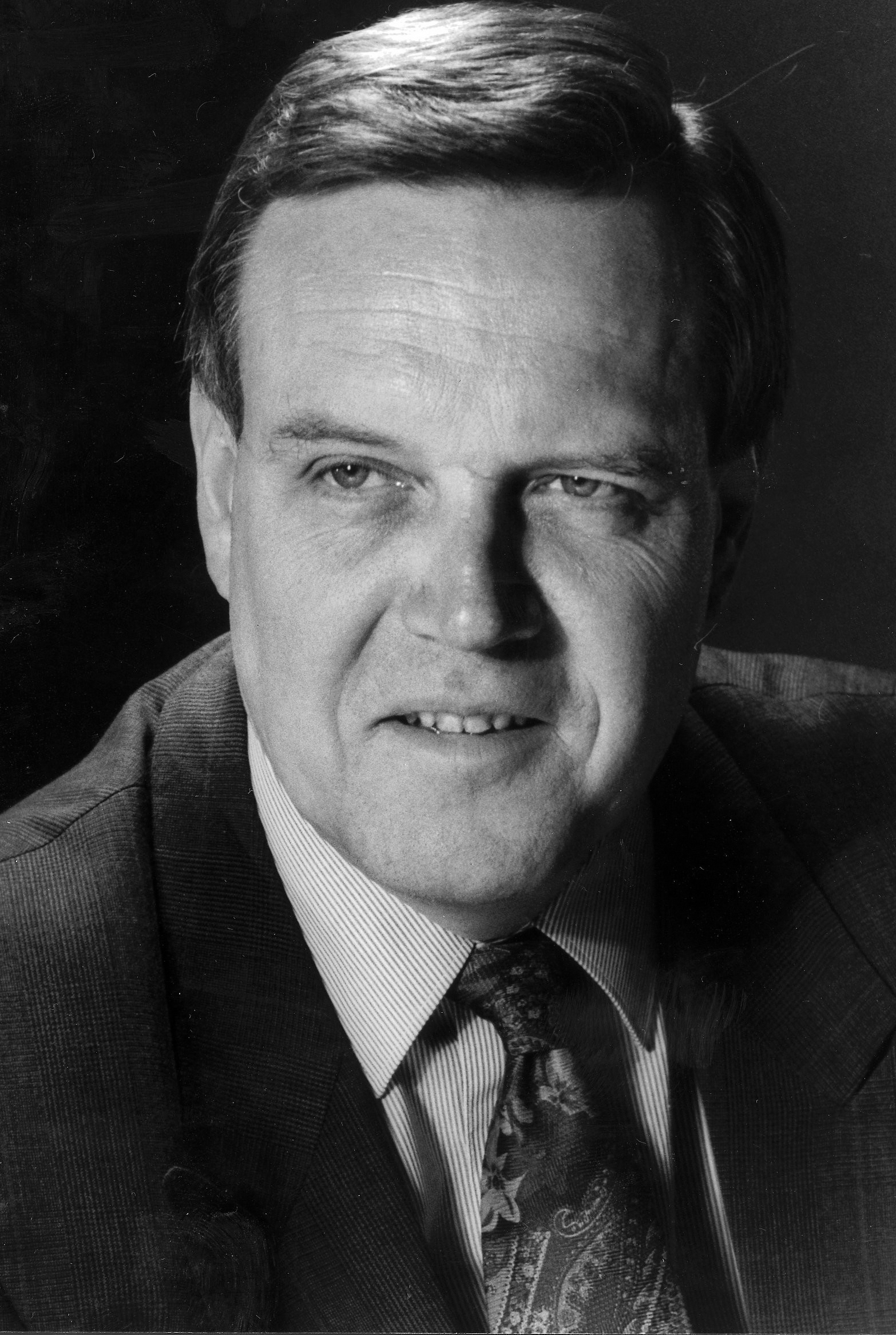
	First party	Second party	Third party
Leader	Heide Simonis	Volker Rühe
Party	SPD	CDU	FDP
Last election	33 seats, 39.8%	30 seats, 37.2%	4 seats, 5.7%
Seats won	41	33	7
Seat change	▲8	▲3	▲3
Popular vote	630,728	515,421	111,649
Percentage	43.1%	35.2%	7.6%
Swing	▲3.3%	▼2.0%	▲1.9%
	Fourth party	Fifth party
Party	Greens	SSW
Last election	6 seats, 8.1%	2 seats, 2.5%
Seats won	5	3
Seat change	▼1	▲1
Popular vote	91,389	60,367
Percentage	6.2%	4.1%
Swing	▼1.9%	▲1.6%
- Results for the single-member constituencies
Minister-President before election
Heide Simonis
SPD
Elected Minister-President
Heide Simonis
SPD

The 2000 Schleswig-Holstein state election was held on 27 February 2000 to elect the members of the Landtag of Schleswig-Holstein. The incumbent coalition government of the Social Democratic Party (SPD) and The Greens led by Minister-President Heide Simonis retained its majority and continued in office.

== Parties ==
The table below lists parties represented in the previous Landtag of Schleswig-Holstein.

Name		Ideology	Leader(s)	1996 result	
Name		Ideology	Leader(s)	Votes (%)	Seats
SPD	Social Democratic Party of Germany; Sozialdemokratische Partei Deutschlands	Social democracy	Heide Simonis	39.8%	33 / 75
CDU	Christian Democratic Union of Germany; Christlich Demokratische Union Deutschlands	Christian democracy	Volker Rühe	37.2%	30 / 75
Grüne	Alliance 90/The Greens; Bündnis 90/Die Grünen	Green politics		8.1%	6 / 75
FDP	Free Democratic Party; Freie Demokratische Partei	Classical liberalism		5.7%	4 / 75
SSW	South Schleswig Voters' Association; Südschleswigscher Wählerverband	Danish and Frisian minority interests		2.5%	2 / 75

== Opinion polling ==
Polling firm	Fieldwork date	Sample size	SPD	CDU	Grüne	FDP	SSW	Others	Lead
2000 state election	27 Feb 2000	–	43.1	35.2	6.2	7.6	4.1	3.7	7.9
Forsa	25 Feb 2000	?	44	36	5	6	4	5	8
Infratest Burke	18 Feb 2000	?	46	?	4	?	4	?	?
Forsa	16 Feb 2000	1,000	44	37	5	6	3	5	7
Infratest dimap	16 Feb 2000	1,000	45	33	4.5	9.5	4	4	12
Forschungsgruppe Wahlen	31 Jan–2 Feb 2000	1,003	44	34	8	8	4	2	10
Forsa	27–31 Jan 2000	1,000	42	40	4	6	3	5	2
Infratest dimap	24–30 Jan 2000	1,000	45	34	5	8	4	4	11
Infratest Burke	28 Jan 2000	?	44	37	5	6	3	5	7
Forsa	20–24 Jan 2000	1,008	43	39	5	6	3	4	4
Infratest dimap	20 Jan 2000	1,001	45	35	5	7	–	8	10
Forsa	Jan 2000	1,000	43	41	4	5	3	4	2
Infratest dimap	Jan 2000	1,000	42	41	6	6	2	3	1
Infratest Burke	18 Dec 1999	~1,000	40	43	?	?	–	?	3
Infratest dimap	3–9 Dec 1999	1,000	41	42	5	5	3	4	1
Infratest Burke	5 Nov 1999	?	37	47	5	4	–	7	10
Infratest Burke	16 Aug–5 Sep 1999	508	42	45	4	4	–	?	3
Infratest Burke	5 Mar 1999	?	42	41	5	4	–	8	1
Infratest Burke	14 Jan 1999	?	46	36	5	5	–	8	10
1996 state election	24 Mar 1996	–	39.8	37.2	8.1	5.7	2.5	6.6	2.6

== Election result ==
Summary of the 27 February 2000 election results for the Landtag of Schleswig-Holstein
Party	Votes	%	+/-	Seats	+/-	Seats %
Social Democratic Party (SPD)	630,827	43.1	▲3.3	41	▲8	46.1
Christian Democratic Union (CDU)	515,521	35.2	▼2.0	33	▲3	37.1
Free Democratic Party (FDP)	111,649	7.6	▲1.9	7	▲3	7.9
Alliance 90/The Greens (Grüne)	91,389	6.2	▼1.9	5	▼1	5.6
South Schleswig Voters' Association (SSW)	60,367	4.1	▲1.6	3	▲1	3.4
Party of Democratic Socialism (PDS)	20,066	1.4	▲1.4	0	±0	0
National Democratic Party (NPD)	15,121	1.0	▲1.0	0	±0	0
Others	19,355	1.3		0	±0	0
Total	1,464,096	100.0		89	▲14	
Voter turnout		69.5	▼2.3			

Popular Vote
SPD	43.08%
CDU	35.20%
FDP	7.63%
B'90/GRÜNE	6.24%
SSW	4.12%
Other	3.73%

Landtag seats
SPD	46.07%
CDU	37.08%
FDP	7.87%
B'90/GRÜNE	5.62%
SSW	3.37%

== Sources ==
- The Federal Returning Officer
