= Ignaz Kiechle =

German politician (1930–2003)

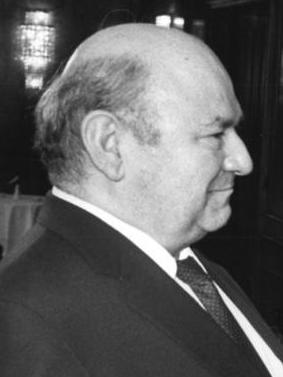
- Kiechle in 1987

Minister for Food, Agriculture and Forestry
- In office 30 March 1983 – 21 January 1993
- Chancellor: Helmut Kohl
- Preceded by: Josef Ertl
- Succeeded by: Jochen Borchert

Member of the Bundestag; from Bavaria
- In office 20 October 1969 – 10 November 1994
- Preceded by: Multi-member district
- Succeeded by: Gerd Müller
- Constituency: State list (1969–1972); Kempten (1972–1976); Oberallgäu (1976–1994)

Personal details
- Born: 23 February 1930 Kempten im Allgäu, Germany
- Died: 2 December 2003 (aged 73) Kempten, Germany
- Party: Christian Social Union
- Children: 4

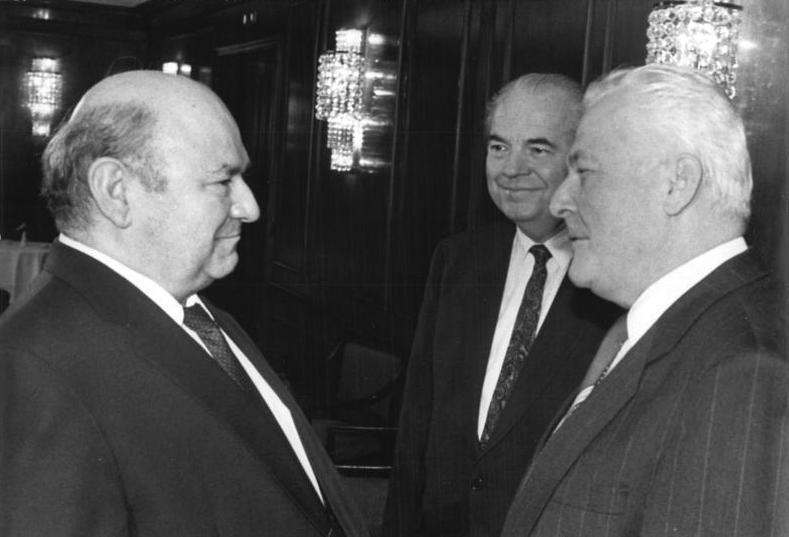
Kiechle (left) with SED Agriculture Secretary Werner Felfe in 1987

Ignaz Kiechle (23 February 1930 – 2 December 2003) was a German politician of the Christian Social Union in Bavaria (CSU).

After the 1983 West German federal election, chancellor Helmut Kohl appointed him Minister of Food, Agriculture, and Forestry (Second Kohl cabinet). After the 1987 election, he had the same position in the Third Kohl cabinet and then, after the German reunification, in the Fourth Kohl cabinet. In January 1993, he left the cabinet because of poor health; Jochen Borchert (CDU) became his successor.

From 1969 to 1994 Kiechle was a member of the Bundestag (German Parliament). From 1959 until 1968 he was a farmer leading the farm of his parents.

Kiechle and his wife Cäcilia had four children. Their son Thomas (born 1967) became mayor of Kempten in 2014.
