= Heide Simonis =

German politician (1943–2023)

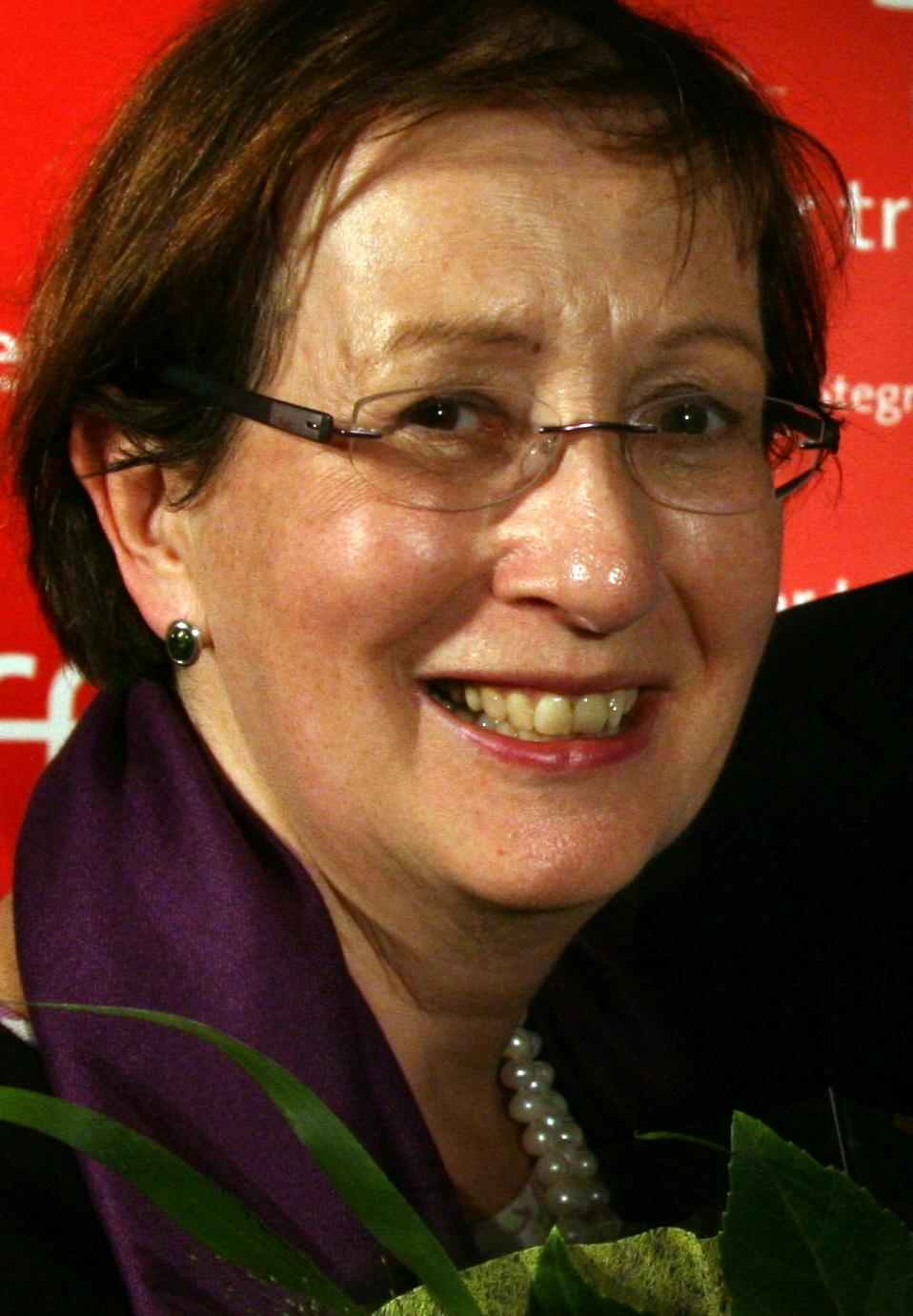
- Simonis in 2009

Minister-President of Schleswig-Holstein
- In office 19 March 1993 – 27 April 2005
- Preceded by: Björn Engholm
- Succeeded by: Peter Harry Carstensen

Schleswig-Holstein Minister of Finance
- In office 5 May 1988 – 19 March 1993
- Preceded by: Roger Asmussen
- Succeeded by: Claus Möller

Member of the Bundestag
- In office 3 October 1976 – 8 June 1988

Personal details
- Born: Heide Steinhardt; 4 July 1943 Bonn, Greater German Reich
- Died: 12 July 2023 (aged 80) Kiel, Schleswig-Holstein, Germany
- Party: Social Democratic
- Education: University of Kiel; University of Erlangen–Nuremberg

Heide Simonis (German: [ˈhaɪdə ziˈmoːnɪs]; 4 July 1943 – 12 July 2023) was a German author and politician of the Social Democratic Party (SPD). She was minister of finance in Schleswig-Holstein from 1988 until 1993, when she became minister-president of Schleswig-Holstein. She was the first woman to serve as head of a state government in German history and the only woman to do so in the 20th century, serving until 2005. As of 2025, she is the longest serving former minister-president of Schleswig-Holstein and also the longest serving former female minister-president of all German states (11 years, 343 days).

== Early life and education ==
Born Heide Steinhardt in Bonn on 4 July 1943, she was the oldest of three sisters. She had asthma as a young child and therefore spent time in children's homes from age three. She completed school with the Abitur in 1962 in Nürnberg. She then studied economics and sociology at the universities of Erlangen-Nürnberg and Kiel, graduating with a degree in economics in 1967. She worked in different positions after 1967, beginning as a lecturer at the University of Lusaka in Zambia. She worked with her husband for an advisory panel of the WHO in Japan on health development. She later worked as vocational counsellor at the employment office of Kiel.

== Career ==
=== National politics ===
Simonis joined the SPD in 1969. She was elected to the German Bundestag in 1976, representing the Rendsburg-Eckernförde district, as then the youngest member of the parliament.

=== State politics ===
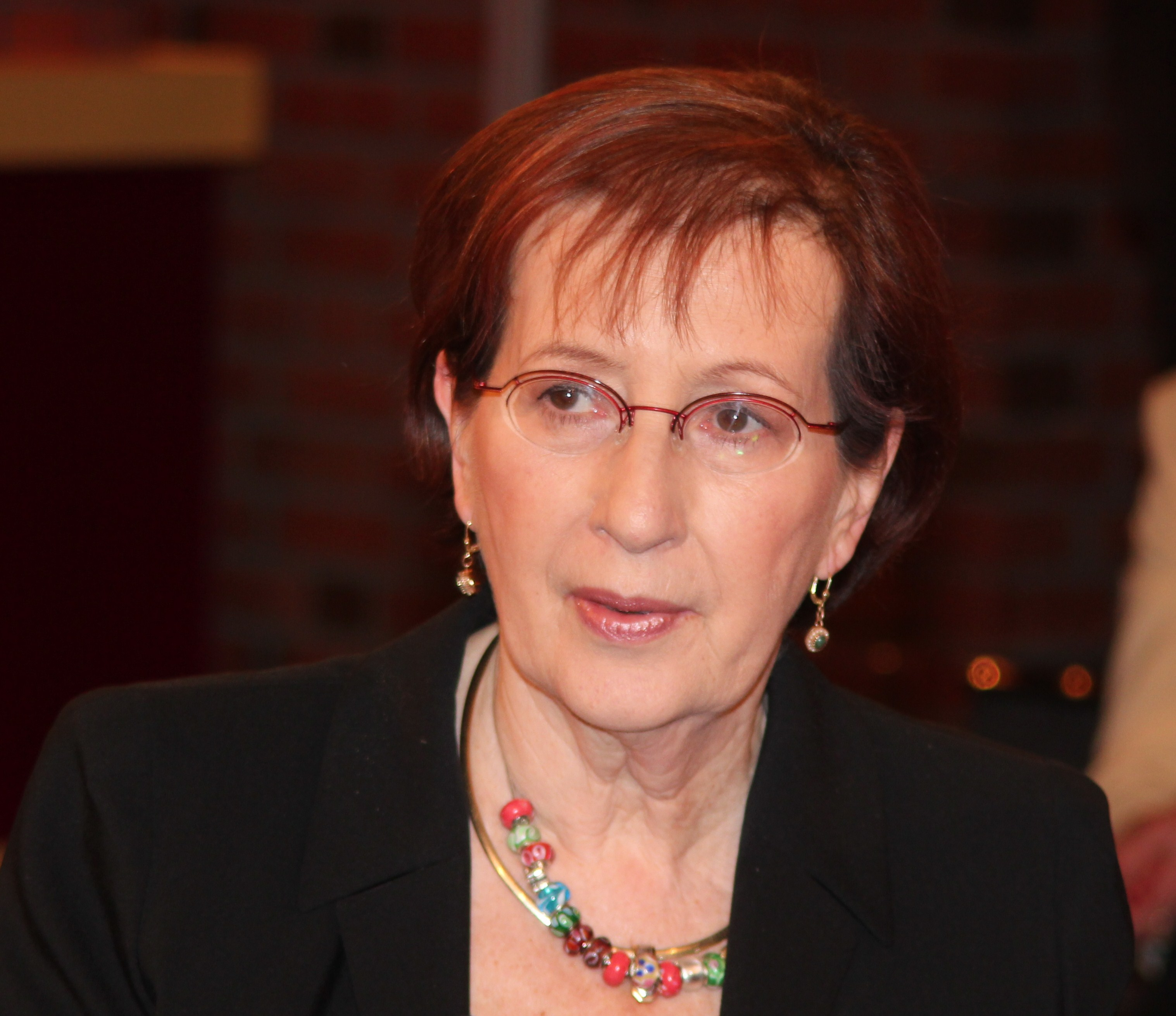
Simonis in 2011

In 1988, Simonis was appointed minister of finance in Schleswig-Holstein by minister-president Björn Engholm. In the 1992 state elections, she became a member of the legislature of Schleswig-Holstein.

On 19 May 1993, Simonis was elected minister-president of Schleswig-Holstein after her predecessor Engholm resigned due to a scandal. She was the first woman in Germany to rise to this level in government. For her first cabinet, she kept almost all of Engholm's ministers.

The 1996 state elections saw the SPD representation drop to 39.8% from 46.2% in 1992, but Simonis was able to form a coalition with the Greens. In the 2000 state elections, at the height of a Christian Democratic Union's donations scandal, the SPD was able to increase its share to 43.1%. At the time, the result was also seen as marking a victory for Chancellor Gerhard Schröder, who had campaigned ardently in support of Simonis.

Despite basing its campaign for the 2005 elections on Simonis' popularity, the SPD suffered a heavy defeat due to the bad economic situation and its support dropped to 38.7% (for the first time in almost twenty years behind the CDU). On 17 March 2005, Simonis failed to be re-elected as minister-president of Schleswig-Holstein in four consecutive ballots by the Schleswig-Holstein Landtag. In the first ballot she received 34 votes and Peter Harry Carstensen (CDU) received 33, while two deputies cast empty votes. Neither Simonis nor Carstensen got the absolute majority (35 votes). In the second and third ballots the candidates received 34 votes each, while one deputy of the alliance of SPD, Greens, and SSW abstained. An unprecedented fourth ballot brought the same result and Simonis stepped down as minister-president of Schleswig-Holstein.

=== After politics ===
Simonis served as chairwoman of the German Committee for UNICEF from 2005 until February 2008. She resigned from this position due to a scandal related to donations to the organisation that arose during her term.

== Personal life and legacy ==
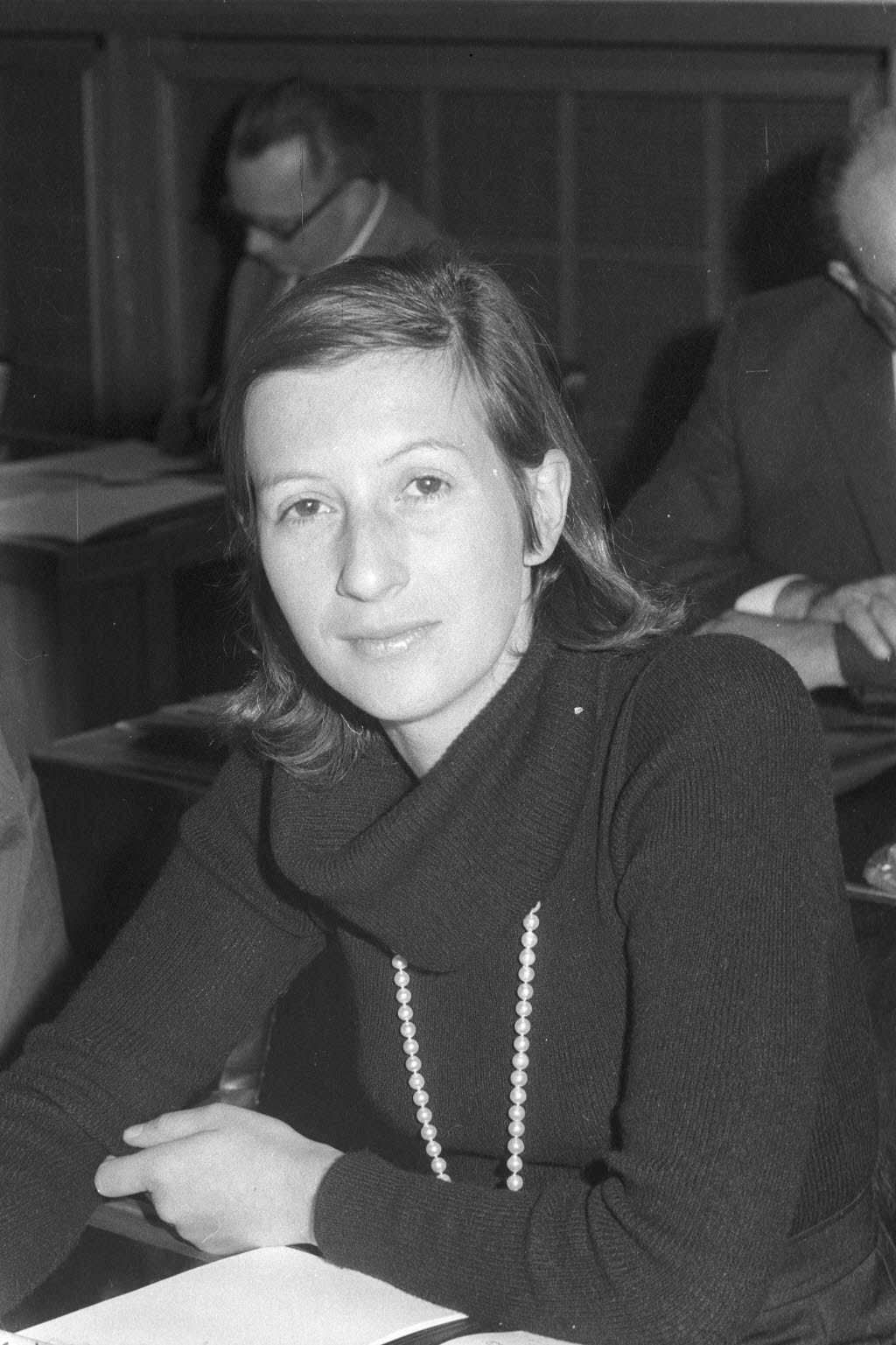
Simonis in 1970

In 1967, Simonis married Udo E. Simonis who had studied with her. He became a professor of economics, with a focus on the environment. Among her hobbies was quiltmaking.

Simonis survived breast cancer. She announced in 2014 that she was diagnosed with Parkinson's disease. She died at home in Kiel on 12 July 2023, at age 80.

President Frank-Walter Steinmeier described her as an exceptional political personality who shaped democracy beyond Schleswig-Holstein. He noted her competence, but also humanity and empathy.

== Publications ==
Books by Simonis include:

- Simonis, Heide (1997). Kein Blatt vorm Mund (in German). Hoffmann Und Campe Verlag. ISBN 3-455-11192-0.
- —— (2003). Unter Männern (in German). C.H.Beck. ISBN 3-406-50959-2.
- ——; Maletzke, Erich (2007). Ausgeteilt, eingesteckt (in German). Zu Klampen!. ISBN 978-3-86674-012-9.
- ——; Steinhardt, Dodo; Steinhardt-Böttcher, Barbara (2008). Drei Rheintöchter (in German). Bouvier. ISBN 978-3-416-03234-6.
- —— (2010). Verzockt! (in German). Vandenhoeck & Ruprecht. ISBN 978-3-525-30002-2.
- —— (3 July 2013). Alles Märchen! (in German). ISBN 978-3-7859-1126-6.
- —— (2016). Heringstage (in German). Borbyer Werkstatt Verlag. ISBN 978-3-940586-10-0.

== Awards ==
- 2014 – Honorary citizen of Schleswig-Holstein
- 2018 – Willy Brandt Medal
