= Gerd Müller (politician) =

German politician (born 1955)

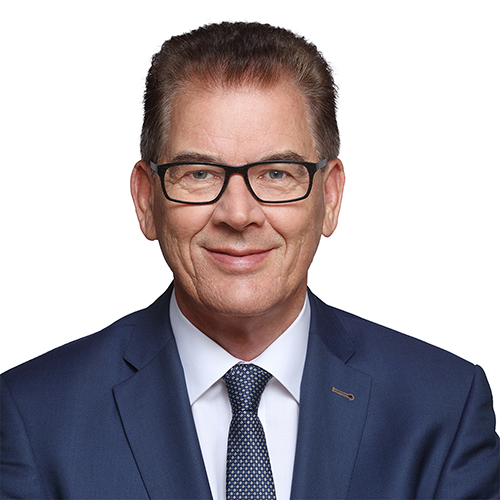
- Müller in 2017

Director General of United Nations Industrial Development Organization
- Incumbent
- Assumed office 10 December 2021
- Preceded by: Li Yong

Minister of Economic Cooperation and Development
- In office 17 December 2013 – 8 December 2021
- Chancellor: Angela Merkel
- Preceded by: Dirk Niebel
- Succeeded by: Svenja Schulze

Parliamentary Secretary of State for Food, Agriculture and Consumer Protection
- In office 22 November 2005 – 17 December 2013
- Minister: Horst Seehofer; Ilse Aigner; Hans-Peter Friedrich (acting)
- Preceded by: Matthias Berninger
- Succeeded by: Maria Flachsbach

Member of the Bundestag; for Oberallgäu
- In office 10 November 1994 – 26 October 2021
- Preceded by: Ignaz Kiechle
- Succeeded by: Mechthilde Wittmann

Member of the European Parliament; for Germany
- In office 18 June 1989 – 12 June 1994

Personal details
- Born: 25 August 1955 (age 71) Krumbach, Bavaria, West Germany
- Party: Christian Social Union
- Children: 2
- Education: Catholic University of Eichstätt-Ingolstadt

Gerhard "Gerd" Müller (born 25 August 1955) is a German politician of the Christian Social Union in Bavaria, who is currently serving as Director General of the United Nations Industrial Development Organization since 2021.

He was German Federal Minister of Economic Cooperation and Development from 2013 to 2021.

From 1994 until 2021, Müller represented Oberallgäu in the Bundestag.

== Political career ==
Müller was chairman of the Junge Union's Bavarian section from 1987 until 1991. In this position, his calls in favour of capital punishment for drug dealers caused significant controversy.

Between 1989 and 1994, Müller was a Member of the European Parliament, where he served on the Committee on Transport and Tourism and on the Joint Assembly of the Agreement between the African, Caribbean and Pacific States and the European Economic Community (ACP-EEC).

From 1994 until 2021, Müller was a member of the German Parliament (Bundestag) for Oberallgäu. He served on the committees for foreign and defense policy and was the spokesman on Europe, foreign, and development policy for the CSU group.

=== Secretary of State at the Federal Ministry of Food, Agriculture and Consumer Protection (2005–2013) ===
From 2005 to 2013, Müller served as Parliamentary State Secretary at the Federal Ministry of Food, Agriculture and Consumer Protection under ministers Horst Seehofer (2005–2008) and Ilse Aigner (2008–2013) in the first and second cabinets of Chancellor Angela Merkel. In this capacity, he was responsible for international relations, third-world development projects, and world food aid programs, among other issues. In 2011, he participated in the first joint cabinet meeting of the governments of Germany and China in Berlin; his counterpart in the Chinese government at the time was Han Changfu.

Following the 2013 federal elections, Müller was part of the CDU/CSU team in the negotiations with the SPD on a coalition agreement.

=== Federal Minister of Economic Cooperation and Development (2013–2021) ===
Since 2013, Müller has been Federal Minister of Economic Cooperation and Development in the third cabinet of Chancellor Angela Merkel; he was succeeded as Parliamentary State Secretary by Peter Bleser.

In February 2014, Müller accompanied German President Joachim Gauck on a state visit to India – where they met with Prime Minister Manmohan Singh and Sonia Gandhi, among others – and to Myanmar.

In October 2014, Müller co-chaired the Berlin Conference on the Syrian Refugee Situation along with Foreign Minister Frank-Walter Steinmeier and the UN High Commissioner for Refugees, António Guterres. In November 2014, he and German Environment Minister Barbara Hendricks hosted a conference which raised $10 billion for the Green Climate Fund’s projects to fight global warming. During his term, the German government pledged €800 million (2016) and €1 billion (2019) in contributions to the Global Fund to Fight AIDS, Tuberculosis and Malaria.

In August 2015, Müller was part of Chancellor Merkel’s delegation to the first joint cabinet meeting of the governments of Germany and Brazil in Brasília. In January 2016, he participated in the first joint cabinet meeting of the governments of Germany and Turkey in Berlin.

In September 2020, Müller announced that he would not stand in the 2021 federal elections but instead resign from active politics by the end of the parliamentary term.

=== Director General of the United Nations Industrial Development Organization ===
While still serving as minister, the German government nominated Müller as its candidate for Director General of the United Nations Industrial Development Organization (UNIDO). In July 2021, he was selected over Bernardo Calzadilla Sarmiento (Bolivia) and Arkebe Oqubay (Ethiopia) by the organization's Industrial Development Board. This selection was confirmed by UNIDO's 19th General Conference in late 2021. Müller took up the position in December 2021.

== Political positions ==
=== Human rights and development ===
In April 2014, Müller became the first member of Chancellor Angela Merkel's cabinet to publicly confront world football's governing body FIFA over its allocation of the 2022 FIFA World Cup to Qatar, criticizing that the choice contradicted global efforts to tackle climate change and that human rights breaches on the country's stadium construction sites even extended to "slave labor." Later that year, he publicly accused Qatar of funding Islamic State (IS) militants, arguing that the country was the "keyword" when it comes to IS financing.

In June 2017, Müller voted against Germany’s introduction of same-sex marriage.

=== International agriculture ===
Müller is strongly in favor of extending subsidizing German agriculture for export, which he hopes will lessen the flow of refugees coming to Europe.

=== Relations to the African continent ===
Müller has in the past voted in favor of German participation in United Nations peacekeeping missions as well as in United Nations-mandated European Union peacekeeping missions on the African continent, such as in Somalia – both Operation Atalanta and EUTM Somalia (2009, 2010, 2011, 2012, 2013, 2014, 2015 and 2018), Darfur/Sudan (2010, 2011, 2012, 2013, 2014, 2015, 2016, 2017 and 2018), South Sudan (2011, 2012, 2013, 2015, 2016 and 2017), Mali (2013, 2014, 2015, 2016, 2017 and 2018), the Central African Republic (2014), and Liberia (2015). He abstained from the vote on extending the mandate for Mali in 2016.

During an official visit in 2019, Müller described the slaughter of some 65,000 Herero and 10,000 Nama tribespeople in Namibia between 1904 and 1908 as genocide, one of the most senior government members to use the term while compensation claims were under discussion.

== Other activities ==
=== Corporate boards ===
- KfW, Ex-Officio Member of the Board of Supervisory Directors

=== International organizations ===
- Joint World Bank-IMF Development Committee, Member
- Multilateral Investment Guarantee Agency (MIGA), World Bank Group, Ex-Officio Member of the Board of Governors (2013–2021)
- World Bank, Ex-Officio Member of the Board of Governors (2013–2021)

=== Non-profit organizations ===
- Welthungerhilfe, Chair of the Board of Trustees
- Kempten University of Applied Sciences, Member of the Board of Trustees
- Hanns Seidel Foundation, Member
- German Spa Association (DHV), President (2008-2012)

== Recognition ==
- World Food Programme’s Hunger Hero Award (2017)

== Personal life ==
Müller is Roman Catholic and married to Gertie Müller-Hoorens, with whom he has two children.
