= Meldorfer Gelehrtenschule =

School in Schleswig-Holstein, Germany

Coordinates: 54.0944°N 9.0720°E

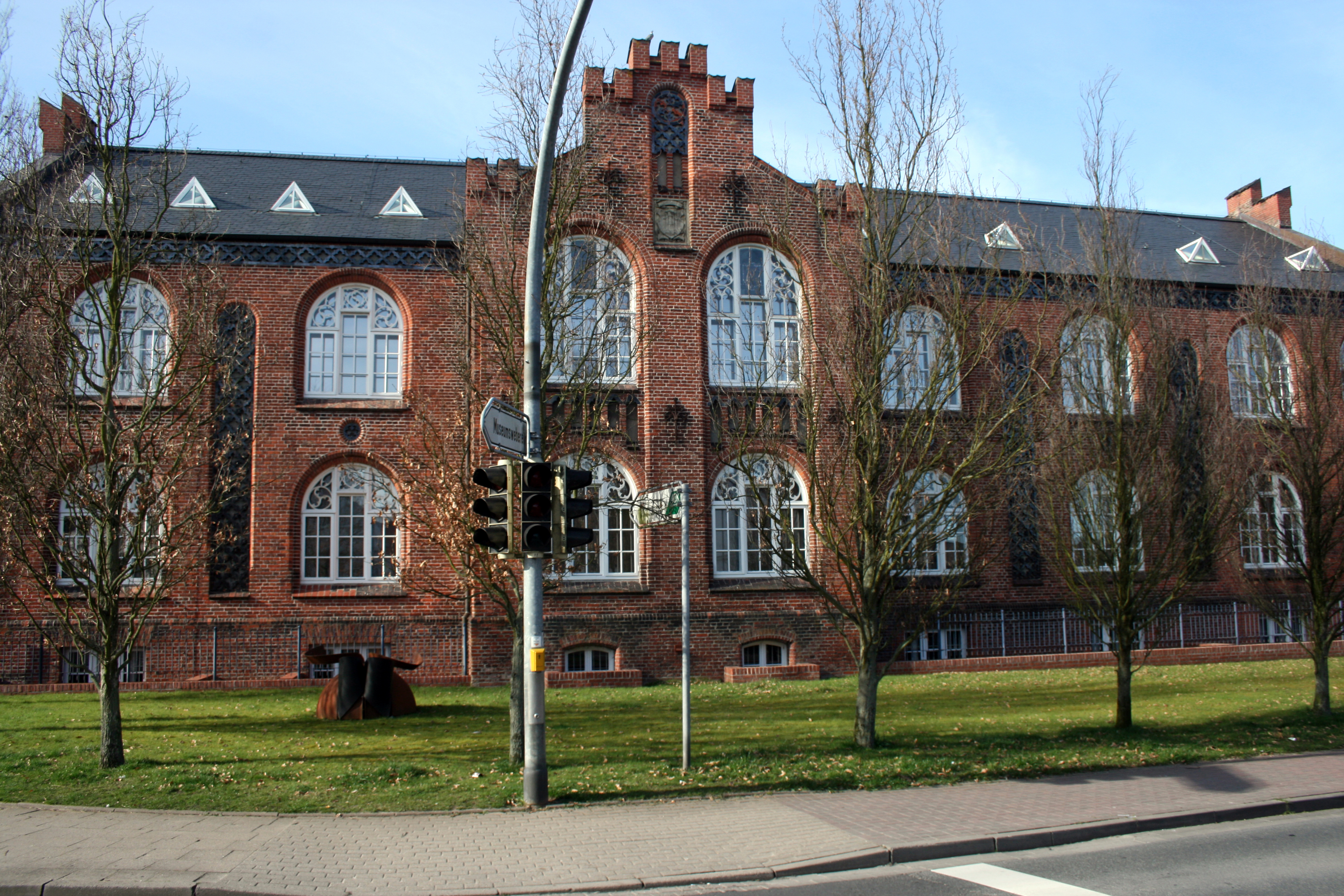
- School buildings in 1962

Location
- Meldorfer Gelehrtenschule; An den Anlagen 16; Meldorf, Dithmarschen, Schleswig-Holstein 25704; Germany

Information
- Type: Gymnasium
- Founded: 1540; 486 years ago
- Faculty: 60
- Enrolment: 886 (2014)
- Website: mgs-meldorf.de

The Meldorfer Gelehrtenschule (MGS) is a Gymnasium in Meldorf in the county Dithmarschen in Schleswig-Holstein. The school was founded as a Latin school in 1540. The School authority is the county Dithmarschen. As of 2014 there are 60 teachers and 886 students in 35 forms.

== History ==
After its founding in 1540 two individual buildings were used as school buildings until they became too small, because of too many students and not enough space to build a library and rooms for science education. Until 1962 today's Dithmarschen county museum was the main school building. In 1962 the school and its students moved to the modern school building.

=== Notable former teachers ===
- Martin Luserke (1880–1968), Progressive Pedagogue, Bard and Writer (1947–1952)

=== Notable former students ===
- Claus Harms (1778–1855), Priest
- Hans Reimer Claussen (1804–1894), Politician (1820–1823)
- Karl Müllenhoff (1818–1884), Teacher and Scientist (1830–1837)
- Adolf Bartels (1862–1945), Poet, Journalist and Politician (1877–1882)
- Gustav Frenssen (1863–1945), Writer
- Elmar Treptow (born 1937), Philosopher and Professor
- Heinrich Aye (1851–1923), Priest, Founder of Ostholstein museum
- Holger Christiansen (born 1957), Teacher and Scientist
- Johann Wadephul (born 1963), Politician
- Lars Jessen (born 1969), Director

== Sources ==
- Meldorfer Gelehrtenschule (Hrsg.): Zu den öffentlichen Prüfungen der Meldorfer Gelehrtenschule, welche ... stattfinden werden, so wie zur Entlassung der Abiturienten ... ladet ergebenst ein. Bundies, Meldorf 1843–1870 (Jg. 1867–1870 Digitized)
- Meldorfer Gelehrtenschule (Hrsg.): Zur Feier des Geburtstages Sr. Majestät des Kaisers Wilhelm I., zu den öffentlichen Prüfungen der Meldorfer Gelehrtenschule ... und zur Entlassung der Abiturienten ... ladet ergebenst ein. Bundies, Meldorf 1871–1872 (Digitized)
- Königliches Gymnasium Meldorf (Hrsg.): Programm des Königlichen Gymnasiums zu Meldorf. Bundies, Meldorf 1873–1881 (Jg. 1874 Digitized)
- Königliches Gymnasium Meldorf (Hrsg.): Einladung zur Vorfeier des Geburtstages Sr. Maj. des Kaisers u. Königs, verbunden mit der Entlassung der Abiturienten ... und zu den öffentlichen Prüfungen der Klassen. Bundies, Meldorf 1875 (Digitized)
- Königliches Gymnasium Meldorf (Hrsg.): Jahresbericht über das Königliche Gymnasium zu Meldorf. Meldorf 1882–1915 (Jg. 1884–1911; 1915 Digitized)
- Wilhelm Lorenz: Geschichte des Königlichen Gymnasiums zu Meldorf bis zum Jahre 1777. Aus den Akten. Festschrift zum 350jährigen Jubiläum der Anstalt. Bundies, Meldorf 1891 (Digitized)
- Wilhelm Lorenz: Festbericht über die Feier des 350jährigen Jubliäums des Königlichen Gymnasiums zu Meldorf am 2. und 3. Juli 1891. Bundies, Meldorf 1892 (Digitized)
- Wilhelm Lorenz, Philipp Grühn: Katalog der Bibliothek des Gymnasiums in Meldorf. Sell, Greifswald 1895 (Digitized)
