= Christine Aschenberg-Dugnus =

German lawyer and politician

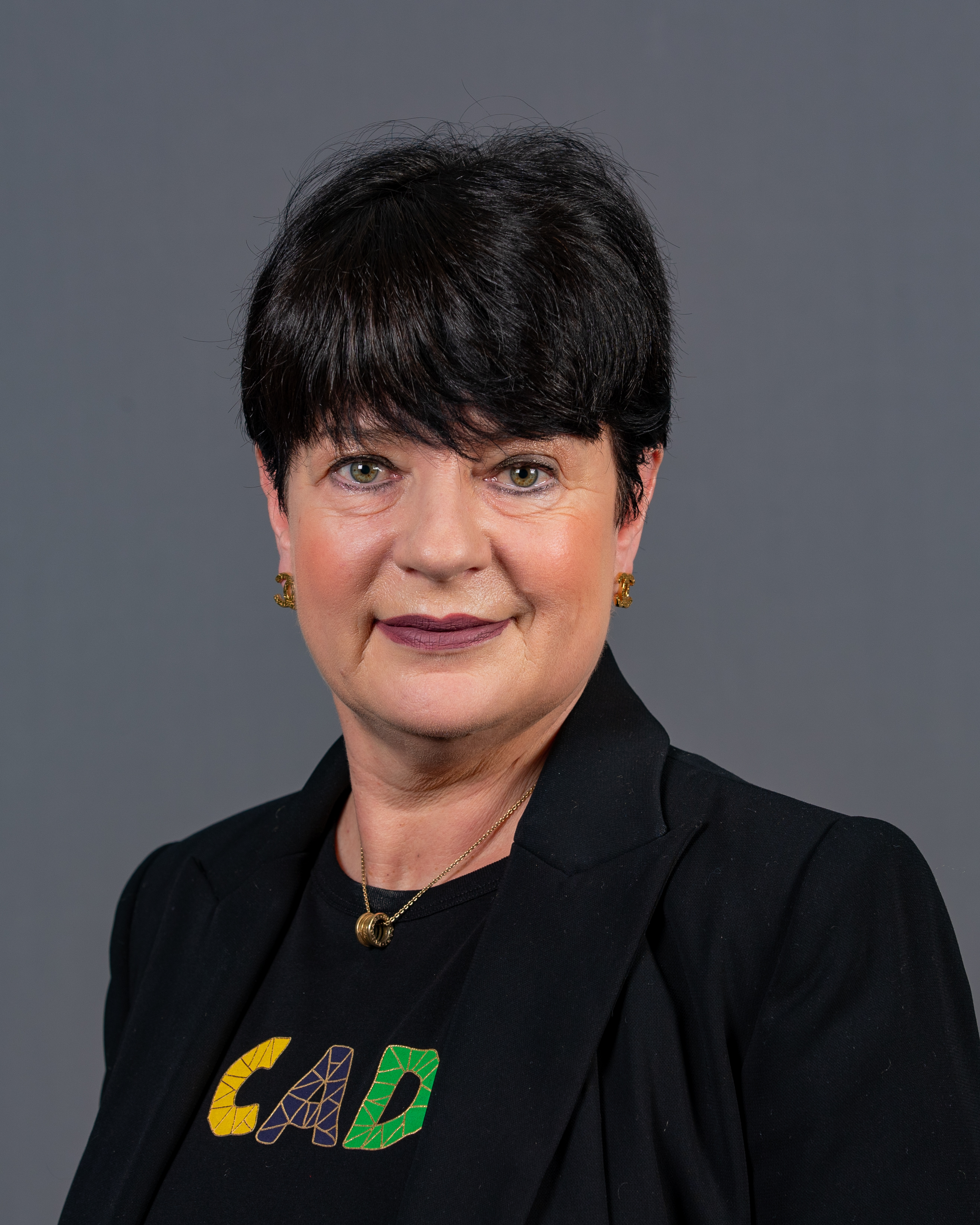
- Aschenberg-Dugnus in 2020

Member of the Bundestag for Schleswig-Holstein
- In office 24 October 2017 – 2025
- Constituency: FDP List
- In office 27 October 2009 – 22 October 2013
- Constituency: FDP List

Personal details
- Born: 22 September 1959 (age 67) Eppstein, West Germany
- Party: Free Democratic Party
- Children: 1
- Education: University of Marburg

Christine Aschenberg-Dugnus (born 22 September 1959) is a German lawyer and politician of the Free Democratic Party (FDP) who served as a member of the Bundestag from the state of Schleswig-Holstein from 2017 to 2025.

== Early life and career ==
After graduating from high school in Kassel, Aschenberg-Dugnus began studying economics at the Gesamthochschule Kassel in 1978, but moved to University of Marburg in 1979, where she studied law until 1985. From 1992 until 2001, she worked at the University of Kiel. Since 2001, she has been running her own law firm in Strande.

== Political career ==
Aschenberg-Dugnus has been a member of the FDP since 1997.

Aschenberg-Dugnus was a member of the German Bundestag from 2009 to 2013, representing the Rendsburg-Eckernförde district. During that time, she served on the Health Committee and the Committee on Legal Affairs.

In the 2017 elections, Aschenberg-Dugnus returned to the Bundestag. She served on the Health Committee. From March 2018, she was her parliamentary group's health policy spokesperson. Since 2019, she has also been a member of the German delegation to the Franco-German Parliamentary Assembly.

In the negotiations to form a so-called traffic light coalition of the Social Democrats (SPD), the Green Party and the FDP following the 2021 federal elections, Aschenberg-Dugnus led her party's delegation in the working group on health policy; her co-chairs from the other parties were Katja Pähle and Maria Klein-Schmeink.

In early 2024, Aschenberg-Dugnus announced that she would not stand in the 2025 federal elections but instead resign from active politics by the end of the parliamentary term.

== Other activities ==
- Deutsche Maritime Akademie, member of the Advisory Board

== Political positions ==
Amid the emergence of the SARS-CoV-2 Omicron variant in Germany in late 2021, Aschenberg-Dugnus was one of 22 members of the FDP parliamentary group who advocated against the introduction of a COVID-19 vaccine mandate.
