= 1996 Schleswig-Holstein state election =

German state election

- 24 March 1996

All 75 seats in the Landtag of Schleswig-Holstein 38 seats needed for a majority
- Turnout: 1,502,088 (71.8%) ▲0.1%
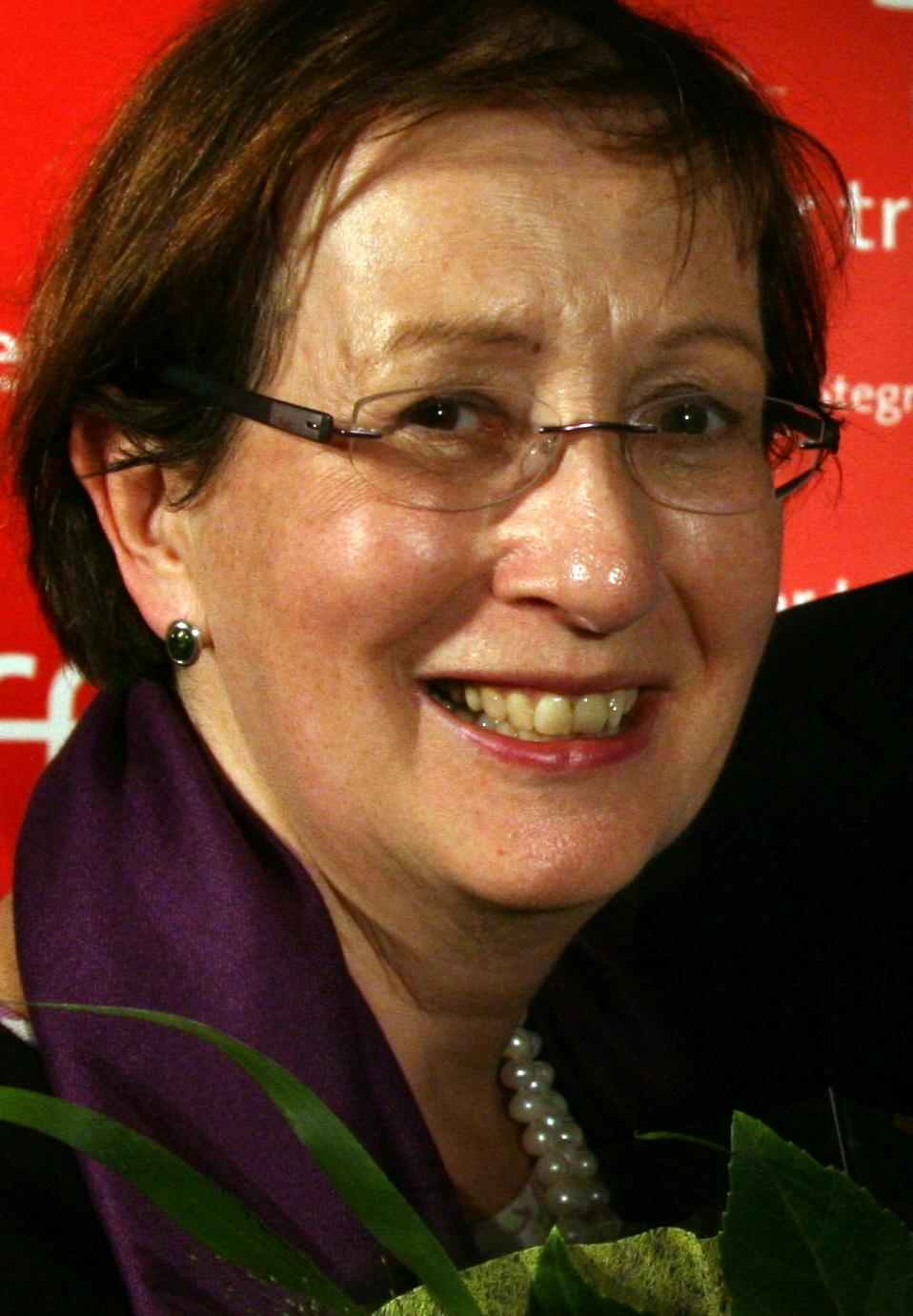

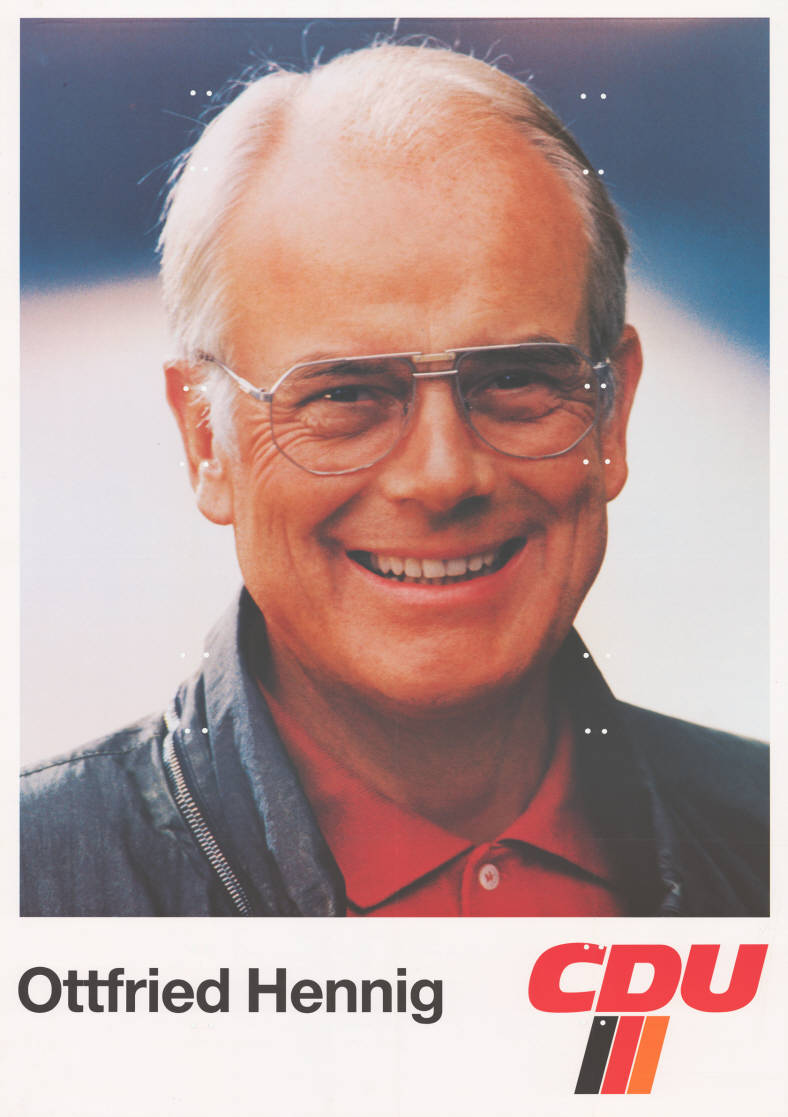
	First party	Second party	Third party
Leader	Heide Simonis	Ottfried Hennig
Party	SPD	CDU	Greens
Last election	45 seats, 46.2%	32 seats, 33.8%	0 seats, 5.0%
Seats won	33	30	6
Seat change	▼12	▼2	▲6
Popular vote	597,751	559,107	121,939
Percentage	39.8%	37.2%	8.1%
Swing	▼6.4%	▲3.4%	▲3.1%
	Fourth party	Fifth party	Sixth party
Party	FDP	DVU	SSW
Last election	5 seats, 5.6%	6 seats, 6.3%	1 seat, 1.9%
Seats won	4	0	2
Seat change	▼1	▼6	▲1
Popular vote	86,227	64,335	38,285
Percentage	5.7%	4.3%	2.5%
Swing	▲0.1%	▼2.0%	▲0.6%
- Results for the single-member constituencies
Minister-President before election
Heide Simonis
SPD
Elected Minister-President
Heide Simonis
SPD

The 1996 Schleswig-Holstein state election was held on 24 March 1996 to elect the members of the Landtag of Schleswig-Holstein. The incumbent Social Democratic Party (SPD) government led by Minister-President Heide Simonis lost its majority. The SPD subsequently formed a coalition with The Greens, and Simonis continued in office.

== Parties ==
The table below lists parties represented in the previous Landtag of Schleswig-Holstein.

Name		Ideology	Leader(s)	1992 result	
Name		Ideology	Leader(s)	Votes (%)	Seats
SPD	Social Democratic Party of Germany; Sozialdemokratische Partei Deutschlands	Social democracy	Heide Simonis	46.2%	45 / 89
CDU	Christian Democratic Union of Germany; Christlich Demokratische Union Deutschlands	Christian democracy	Ottfried Hennig	33.8%	32 / 89
DVU	German People's Union; Deutsche Volksunion	German nationalism		6.3%	6 / 89
FDP	Free Democratic Party; Freie Demokratische Partei	Classical liberalism		5.6%	5 / 89
SSW	South Schleswig Voters' Association; Südschleswigscher Wählerverband	Danish and Frisian minority interests		1.9%	1 / 89

== Election result ==
Summary of the 24 March 1996 election results for the Landtag of Schleswig-Holstein
Party	Votes	%	+/-	Seats	+/-	Seats %
Social Democratic Party (SPD)	597,751	39.8	▼6.4	33	▼12	44.0
Christian Democratic Union (CDU)	559,107	37.2	▲3.4	30	▼2	40.0
Alliance 90/The Greens (Grüne)	121,939	8.1	▲3.1	6	▲6	8.0
Free Democratic Party (FDP)	86,227	5.7	▲0.1	4	▼1	5.3
South Schleswig Voters' Association (SSW)	38,285	2.5	▲0.6	2	▲1	2.7
German People's Union (DVU)	64,335	4.3	▼2.0	0	▼6	0
Voters' Community of Schleswig-Holstein (WSH)	28,206	1.9	▲1.9	0	±0	0
Others	6,238	0.4		0	±0	0
Total	1,502,088	100.0		75	▼14	
Voter turnout		71.8	▲0.1			

Popular Vote
SPD	39.79%
CDU	37.22%
B'90/GRÜNE	8.12%
FDP	5.74%
DVU	4.28%
SSW	2.55%
Other	2.29%

Landtag seats
SPD	44.00%
CDU	40.00%
B'90/GRÜNE	8.00%
FDP	5.33%
SSW	2.67%

== Sources ==
- Wahlen in Schleswig-Holstein seit 1947
