= Stephan Thomae =

German politician (born 1968)

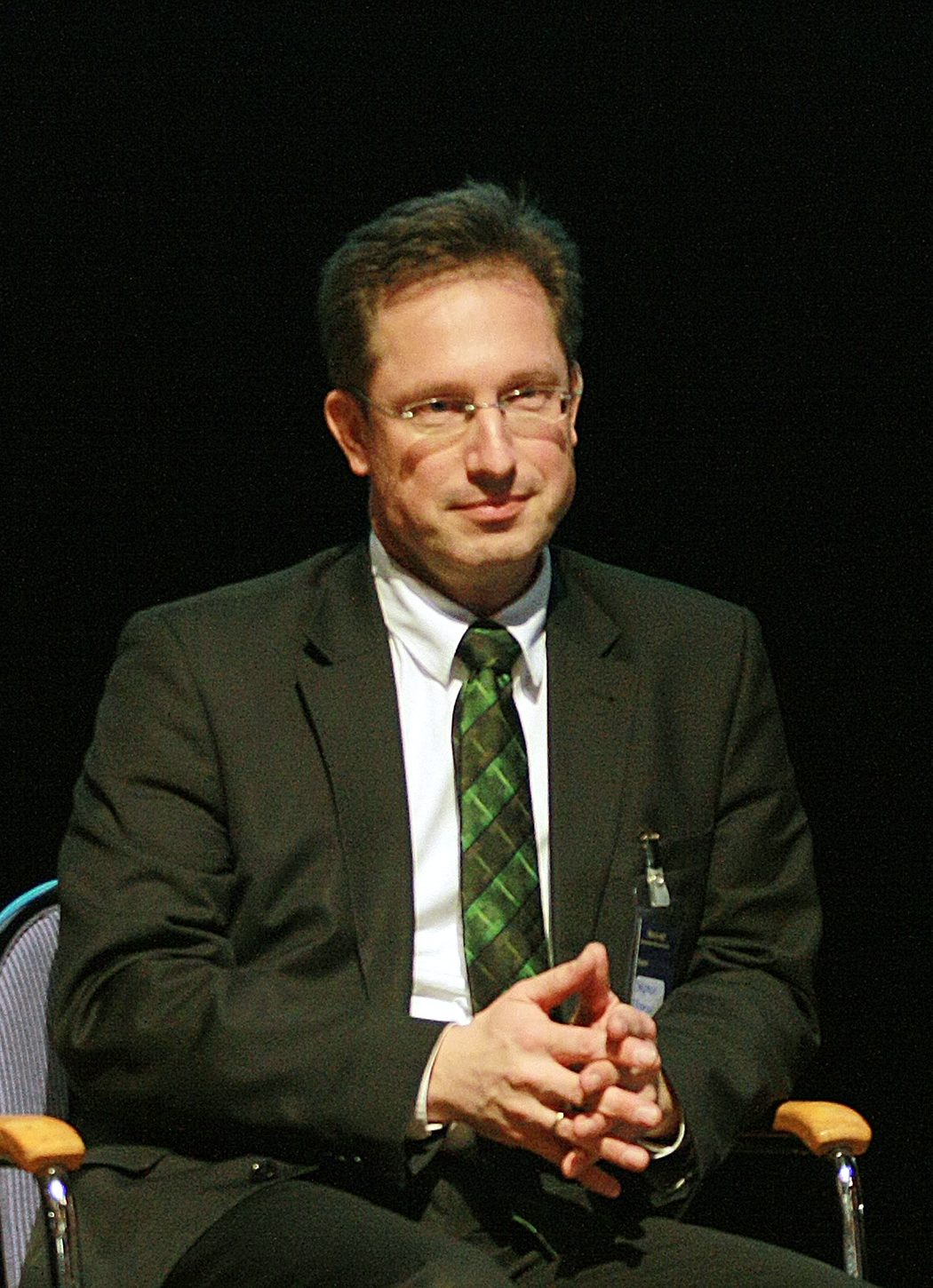
- Thomae in 2012

Member of the Bundestag
- In office 2017–2025
- In office 2009–2013

Personal details
- Born: 19 June 1968 (age 58) Kempten, West Germany (now Germany)
- Party: FDP
- Children: 3
- Education: LMU Munich

Stephan Thomae (born 19 June 1968) is a German lawyer and politician of the Free Democratic Party (FDP) who served as a member of the Bundestag from the state of Bavaria from 2009 to 2013 and again from 2017 to 2025.

== Early life and career ==
After graduating from the humanistic Carl-von-Linde-Gymnasium Kempten, Thomae did his military service. He then studied history and law, which he completed in 1993 as Magister Artium and in 1995 with the first state examination in law.

Since Thomae passed his second state examination in 1998, he has been working as a lawyer.

== Political career ==
Thomae first became a member of the Bundestag in the 2009 German federal election. In parliament, he served on the Committee on Legal Affairs and Consumer Protection; its Subcommittee on European Affairs; the Budget Committee; and the Audit Committee.

Thomae became a member of the Bundestag again in the 2017 German federal election. He served as deputy chairman of the FDP parliamentary group under the leadership of chairman Christian Lindner. He also joined the Committee for the Scrutiny of Acoustic Surveillance of the Private Home and the Parliamentary Oversight Panel (PKGr), which provides parliamentary oversight of Germany's intelligence services BND, BfV and MAD.

In addition to his committee assignments, Thomae was part of the German-Ukrainian Parliamentary Friendship Group.

In the negotiations to form a so-called traffic light coalition of the Social Democrats (SPD), the Green Party and the FDP following the 2021 federal elections, Thomae led his party's delegation in the working group on children, youth and families; his co-chairs from the other parties are Serpil Midyatli and Katrin Göring-Eckardt.

From 2022, Thomas served on the parliamentary body in charge of appointing judges to the Highest Courts of Justice, namely the Federal Court of Justice (BGH), the Federal Administrative Court (BVerwG), the Federal Fiscal Court (BFH), the Federal Labour Court (BAG), and the Federal Social Court (BSG). That same year, he joined the Commission for the Reform of the Electoral Law and the Modernization of Parliamentary Work, co-chaired by Johannes Fechner and Nina Warken.

== Other activities ==
- Kempten University of Applied Sciences, Member of the Board of Trustees (since 2022)
- Augsburg University of Applied Sciences, Member of the Board of Trustees
- German Foundation for International Legal Cooperation (IRZ), Member
- Amnesty International, Member
