= Otto Bernhardt =

German politician (1942–2021)

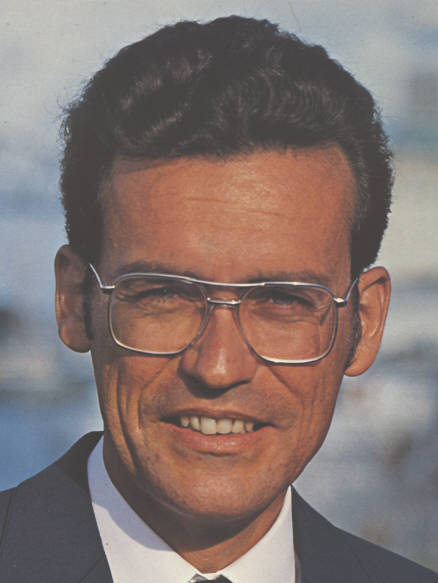
Otto Bernhardt in 1979

Otto Bernhardt (13 February 1942 in Rendsburg – 8 October 2021) was a German politician of the CDU. Bernhardt had been a member of the Bundestag from 1998 until 2009.
