= Sönke Rix =

German politician

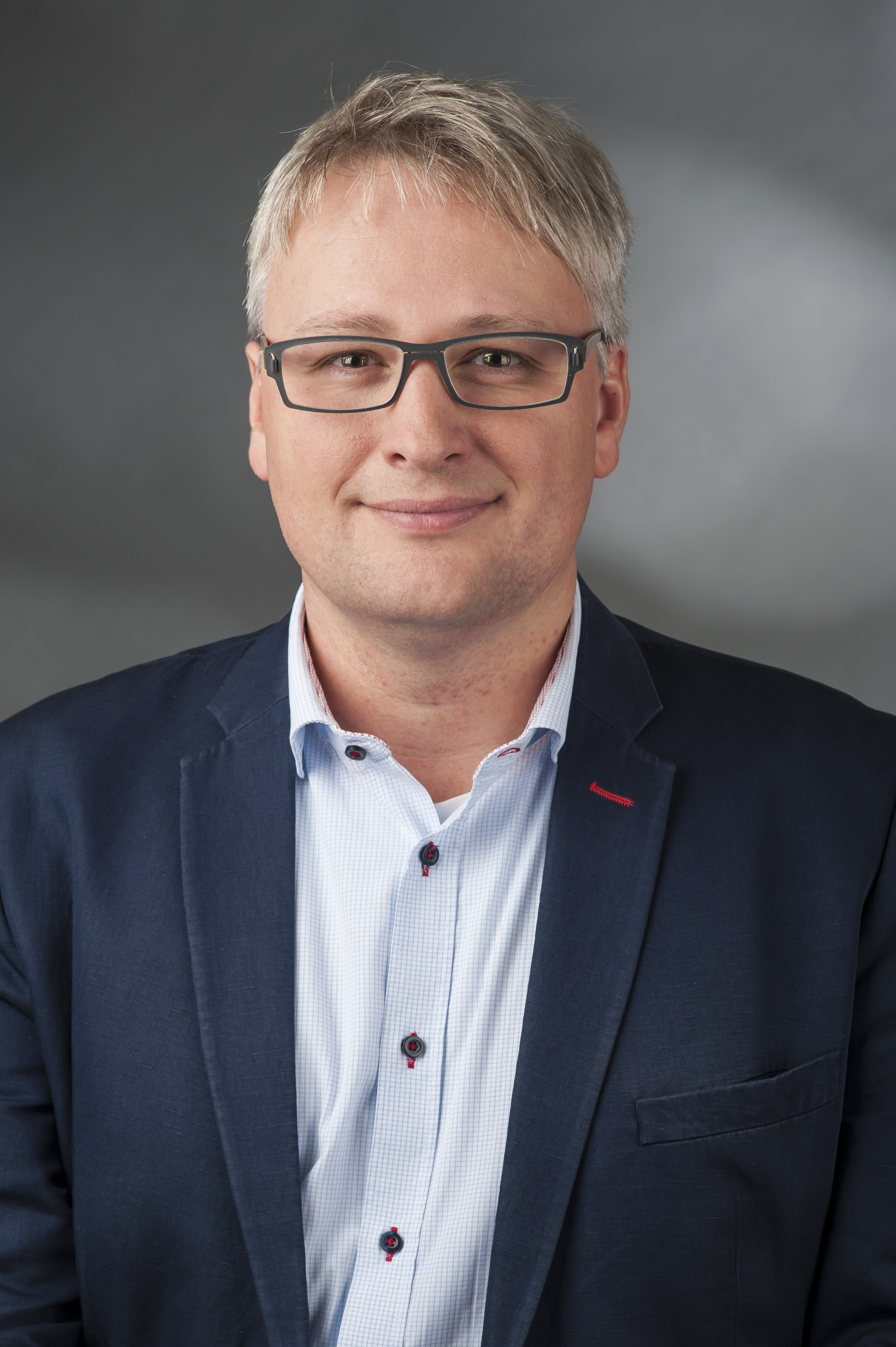
- Rix in 2014

Member of the Bundestag
- In office 2005–2025

Personal details
- Born: 3 December 1975 (age 50) Eckernförde, West Germany (now Germany)
- Party: SPD

Sönke Rix (born 3 December 1975) is a former German politician of the Social Democratic Party (SPD) who served as a member of the Bundestag from the state of Schleswig-Holstein from 2005 to 2025.

== Political career ==
=== Member of the German Bundestag, 2005–2025 ===
Rix first became a member of the Bundestag in the 2005 German federal election. Throughout his time in parliament, he was part of the Committee on Family, Senior Citizens, Women and Youth. From 2014 to 2019, he served as his parliamentary group's spokesperson on family, senior citizens, women and youth.

Within the SPD parliamentary group, Rix belonged to the Parliamentary Left, a left-wing movement.

In the negotiations to form a fourth coalition government under the leadership of Chancellor Angela Merkel following the 2017 federal elections, Rix was part of the working group on families, women, seniors and youth, led by Annette Widmann-Mauz, Angelika Niebler and Katarina Barley.

From 2019, Rix served as deputy chairman of the SPD in Schleswig-Holstein. Ahead of the 2021 elections, he was elected to lead the SPD's campaign in Schleswig-Holstein.

In the negotiations to form a so-called traffic light coalition of the SPD, the Green Party and the Free Democratic Party (FDP) following the 2021 German elections, Rix was again part of his party's delegation in the working group on children, youth and families, this time co-chaired by Serpil Midyatli, Katrin Göring-Eckardt and Stephan Thomae. From December 2021, he served as one of his parliamentary group's deputy chairs, under the leadership of chairman Rolf Mützenich.

In March 2024, Rix announced that he would not stand in the 2025 federal elections but instead resign from active politics by the end of the parliamentary term.

=== Later career ===
In November 2025, Rix was announced to be the next president of the Federal Agency for Civic Education (BPB), succeeding Thomas Krüger. The official appointment was expected soon after, but Rix was confirmed in early March 2026.

=== Political Positions ===
In 2022 Rix stated that the fight against extremism has to be a fight against the right in the first place. He later claimed on social media that his party, the SPD, had the fight against Fascism in her DNA for 160 years.

In 2016 he praised Innkeepers in his constituency for not allowing the Alternative for Germany into their establishments.

== Other activities ==
- German United Services Trade Union (ver.di), Member
- Greenpeace, Member
