= Kempten University of Applied Sciences =

Coordinates: 47°42′57″N 10°18′49″E

- Hochschule Kempten
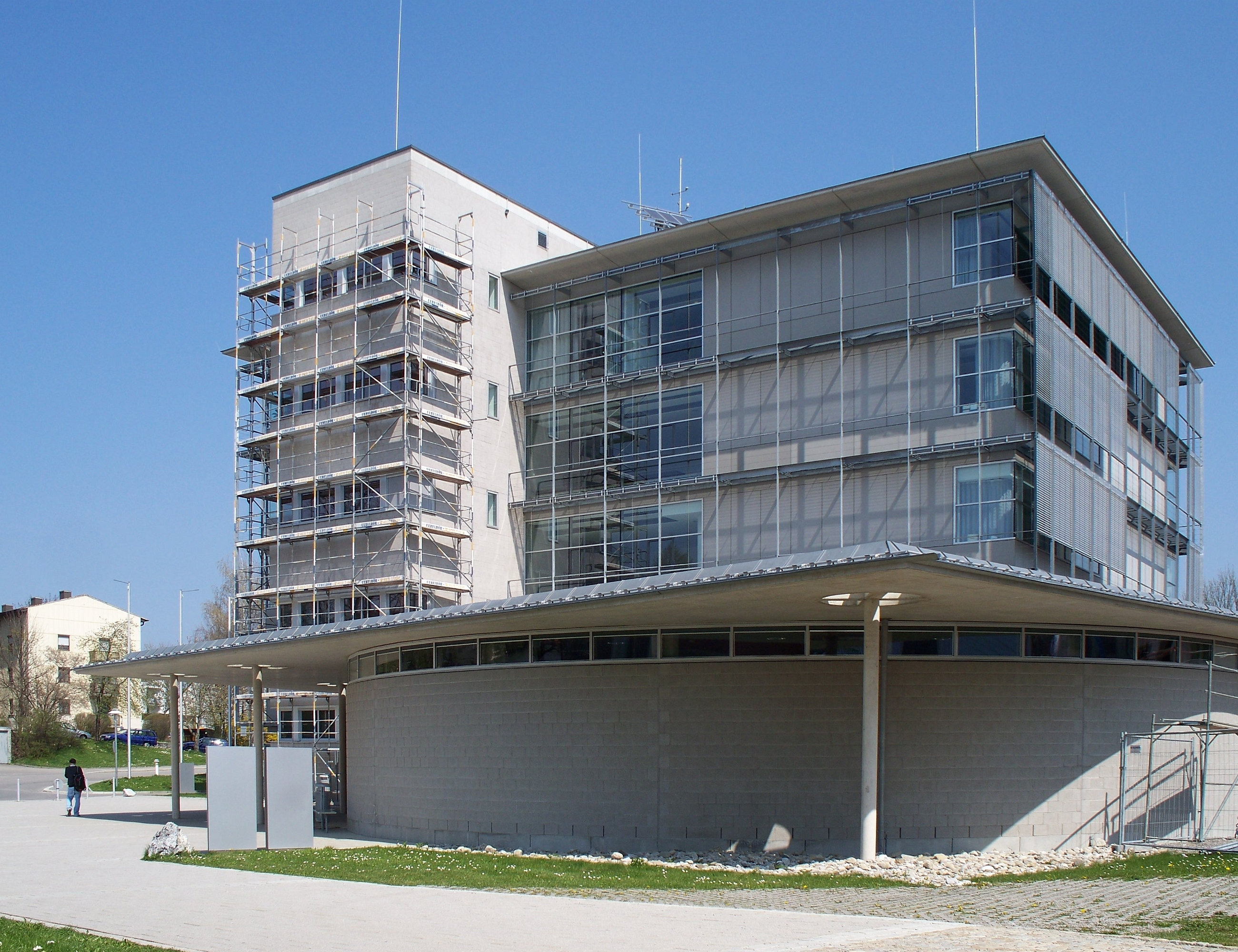
- Gebäude der Hochschule Kempten
- Type: Public
- Established: 1977
- President: Robert F. Schmidt
- Academic staff: about 300
- Students: 4,644
- Location: Kempten im Allgäu, Bavaria, Germany
- Website: www.hochschule-kempten.de

The Kempten University of Applied Sciences or Hochschule Kempten is a university of applied sciences in Kempten im Allgäu, Germany.

== Faculties ==
The Kempten University of Applied Sciences has the following faculties:

- Business Administration
- Electrical Engineering
- Computer Science
- Mechanical Engineering
- Social and Health Studies
- Tourism Management

== Cooperations ==
The Kempten University of Applied Sciences is part of the Internationale Bodensee-Hochschule. Besides there are 80 Universities outside of Germany which have a cooperation with the Kempten University of Applied Sciences.
