= Lörrach – Müllheim =

Federal electoral district of Germany

282 Lörrach – Müllheim
- Electoral district for the Bundestag
- Lörrach – Müllheim in 2025
- State: Baden-Württemberg
- Population: 324,200 (2019)
- Electorate: 229,946 (2025)
- Major settlements: Lörrach; Rheinfelden; Weil am Rhein
- Area: 1,155.1 km^{2}

Current electoral district
- Created: 1949
- Member: Stefan Glaser
- Elected: 2026

Lörrach – Müllheim is an electoral constituency (German: Wahlkreis) represented in the Bundestag. It elects one member via first-past-the-post voting. Under the current constituency numbering system, it is designated as constituency 282. It is located in southwestern Baden-Württemberg, comprising the district of Lörrach and southwestern parts of the district of Breisgau-Hochschwarzwald.

Lörrach – Müllheim was created for the inaugural 1949 federal election. Whilst the Christian Democratic Union won a plurality in the 2025 election, under the new voting system, their candidate did not actually win a seat in the Bundestag. This was due to the distribution of seats won by the CDU being decided by the first (direct) vote percentage of each winning CDU candidate, determining who took the seats. As the CDU candidate got a low vote of 33.2%, the seat was vacant from 2025 to 2026; winning candidate Stefan Glaser entered the Bundestag in 2026 upon the resignation of Andreas Jung.

== Geography ==
Lörrach – Müllheim is located in southwestern Baden-Württemberg. As of the 2021 federal election, it comprises the Lörrach district and the municipalities of Auggen, Bad Krozingen, Badenweiler, Ballrechten-Dottingen, Buggingen, Eschbach, Hartheim am Rhein, Heitersheim, Müllheim, Münstertal/Schwarzwald, Neuenburg am Rhein, Staufen im Breisgau, and Sulzburg from the Breisgau-Hochschwarzwald district.

== History ==
Lörrach – Müllheim was created in 1949, then known as Lörrach. It acquired its current name in the 1965 election. In the 1949 election, it was Baden constituency 3 in the numbering system. In the 1953 through 1961 elections, it was number 185. In the 1965 through 1976 elections, it was number 189. In the 1980 through 1998 elections, it was number 186. In the 2002 and 2005 elections, it was number 283. Since the 2009 election, it has been number 282.

Originally, the constituency comprised the districts of Lörrach, Säckingen, and Müllheim. In the 1965 through 1976 elections, it comprised the districts of Lörrach and Müllheim. It acquired its current borders in the 1980 election.

Election	No.	Name	Borders
1949	3	Lörrach	Lörrach district; Säckingen district; Müllheim district
1953	185	Lörrach	Lörrach district; Säckingen district; Müllheim district
1957	185	Lörrach	Lörrach district; Säckingen district; Müllheim district
1961	185	Lörrach	Lörrach district; Säckingen district; Müllheim district
1965	189	Lörrach – Müllheim	Lörrach district; Müllheim district
1969	189	Lörrach – Müllheim	Lörrach district; Müllheim district
1972	189	Lörrach – Müllheim	Lörrach district; Müllheim district
1976	189	Lörrach – Müllheim	Lörrach district; Müllheim district
1980	186	Lörrach – Müllheim	Lörrach district; Breisgau-Hochschwarzwald district (only Auggen, Bad Krozingen, Badenweiler, Ballrechten-Dottingen, Buggingen, Eschbach, Hartheim am Rhein, Heitersheim, Müllheim, Münstertal/Schwarzwald, Neuenburg am Rhein, Staufen im Breisgau, and Sulzburg municipalities)
1983	186	Lörrach – Müllheim	Lörrach district; Breisgau-Hochschwarzwald district (only Auggen, Bad Krozingen, Badenweiler, Ballrechten-Dottingen, Buggingen, Eschbach, Hartheim am Rhein, Heitersheim, Müllheim, Münstertal/Schwarzwald, Neuenburg am Rhein, Staufen im Breisgau, and Sulzburg municipalities)
1987	186	Lörrach – Müllheim	Lörrach district; Breisgau-Hochschwarzwald district (only Auggen, Bad Krozingen, Badenweiler, Ballrechten-Dottingen, Buggingen, Eschbach, Hartheim am Rhein, Heitersheim, Müllheim, Münstertal/Schwarzwald, Neuenburg am Rhein, Staufen im Breisgau, and Sulzburg municipalities)
1990	186	Lörrach – Müllheim	Lörrach district; Breisgau-Hochschwarzwald district (only Auggen, Bad Krozingen, Badenweiler, Ballrechten-Dottingen, Buggingen, Eschbach, Hartheim am Rhein, Heitersheim, Müllheim, Münstertal/Schwarzwald, Neuenburg am Rhein, Staufen im Breisgau, and Sulzburg municipalities)
1994	186	Lörrach – Müllheim	Lörrach district; Breisgau-Hochschwarzwald district (only Auggen, Bad Krozingen, Badenweiler, Ballrechten-Dottingen, Buggingen, Eschbach, Hartheim am Rhein, Heitersheim, Müllheim, Münstertal/Schwarzwald, Neuenburg am Rhein, Staufen im Breisgau, and Sulzburg municipalities)
1998	186	Lörrach – Müllheim	Lörrach district; Breisgau-Hochschwarzwald district (only Auggen, Bad Krozingen, Badenweiler, Ballrechten-Dottingen, Buggingen, Eschbach, Hartheim am Rhein, Heitersheim, Müllheim, Münstertal/Schwarzwald, Neuenburg am Rhein, Staufen im Breisgau, and Sulzburg municipalities)
2002	283	Lörrach – Müllheim	Lörrach district; Breisgau-Hochschwarzwald district (only Auggen, Bad Krozingen, Badenweiler, Ballrechten-Dottingen, Buggingen, Eschbach, Hartheim am Rhein, Heitersheim, Müllheim, Münstertal/Schwarzwald, Neuenburg am Rhein, Staufen im Breisgau, and Sulzburg municipalities)
2005	283	Lörrach – Müllheim	Lörrach district; Breisgau-Hochschwarzwald district (only Auggen, Bad Krozingen, Badenweiler, Ballrechten-Dottingen, Buggingen, Eschbach, Hartheim am Rhein, Heitersheim, Müllheim, Münstertal/Schwarzwald, Neuenburg am Rhein, Staufen im Breisgau, and Sulzburg municipalities)
2009	282	Lörrach – Müllheim	Lörrach district; Breisgau-Hochschwarzwald district (only Auggen, Bad Krozingen, Badenweiler, Ballrechten-Dottingen, Buggingen, Eschbach, Hartheim am Rhein, Heitersheim, Müllheim, Münstertal/Schwarzwald, Neuenburg am Rhein, Staufen im Breisgau, and Sulzburg municipalities)
2013	282	Lörrach – Müllheim	Lörrach district; Breisgau-Hochschwarzwald district (only Auggen, Bad Krozingen, Badenweiler, Ballrechten-Dottingen, Buggingen, Eschbach, Hartheim am Rhein, Heitersheim, Müllheim, Münstertal/Schwarzwald, Neuenburg am Rhein, Staufen im Breisgau, and Sulzburg municipalities)
2017	282	Lörrach – Müllheim	Lörrach district; Breisgau-Hochschwarzwald district (only Auggen, Bad Krozingen, Badenweiler, Ballrechten-Dottingen, Buggingen, Eschbach, Hartheim am Rhein, Heitersheim, Müllheim, Münstertal/Schwarzwald, Neuenburg am Rhein, Staufen im Breisgau, and Sulzburg municipalities)
2021	282	Lörrach – Müllheim	Lörrach district; Breisgau-Hochschwarzwald district (only Auggen, Bad Krozingen, Badenweiler, Ballrechten-Dottingen, Buggingen, Eschbach, Hartheim am Rhein, Heitersheim, Müllheim, Münstertal/Schwarzwald, Neuenburg am Rhein, Staufen im Breisgau, and Sulzburg municipalities)
2025	282	Lörrach – Müllheim	Lörrach district; Breisgau-Hochschwarzwald district (only Auggen, Bad Krozingen, Badenweiler, Ballrechten-Dottingen, Buggingen, Eschbach, Hartheim am Rhein, Heitersheim, Müllheim, Münstertal/Schwarzwald, Neuenburg am Rhein, Staufen im Breisgau, and Sulzburg municipalities)

== Members ==
The constituency has been held by Christian Democratic Union (CDU) during all but three Bundestag terms since its creation. It was first represented by Lambert Schill from 1949 to 1957, followed by Herbert Wolff from 1957 to 1961 and Karl August Bühler from 1961 to 1969. Heinz Eyrich was representative from 1969 to 1980, followed by Wilhelm Jung from 1980 to 1990 and Ortrun Schätzle from 1990 to 1998. Marion Caspers-Merk of the Social Democratic Party (SPD) was elected in 1998 and served until 2009. Armin Schuster of the CDU was representative from 2009 to 2021. He was succeeded by party fellow Diana Stöcker in 2021. The seat was vacant from the 2025 election to 2026.

Election	Member	Party	%
1949	Lambert Schill	CDU	41.3
1953	Lambert Schill	CDU	56.9
1957	Herbert Wolff	CDU	54.4
1961	Karl August Bühler	CDU	45.6
1965	Karl August Bühler	CDU	48.6
1969	Heinz Eyrich	CDU	48.6
1972	Heinz Eyrich	CDU	46.6
1976	Heinz Eyrich	CDU	49.8
1980	Wilhelm Jung	CDU	45.5
1983	Wilhelm Jung	CDU	53.6
1987	Wilhelm Jung	CDU	47.5
1990	Ortrun Schätzle	CDU	47.3
1994	Ortrun Schätzle	CDU	45.5
1998	Marion Caspers-Merk	SPD	45.0
2002	Marion Caspers-Merk	SPD	45.4
2005	Marion Caspers-Merk	SPD	43.7
2009	Armin Schuster	CDU	37.9
2013	Armin Schuster	CDU	50.1
2017	Armin Schuster	CDU	39.4
2021	Diana Stöcker	CDU	25.2
2025	Vacant (Note: Stefan Glaser (CDU) won with 33.2% but seat remained vacant due to insufficient second votes cover.)		
2026	Stefan Glaser	CDU	33.2

== Election results ==
=== 2025 election ===
Under the new voting system implemented for the 2025 election, although the CDU candidate won the most votes in this constituency, due to the low winning percentage, the constituency seat remained vacant as not enough second (party) votes were won to be allocated this seat.

Federal election (2025): Lörrach – Müllheim
Notes:	Blue background denotes the winner of the electorate vote. Pink background denotes a candidate elected from their party list. Yellow background denotes an electorate win by a list member, or other incumbent. A ✓ or ✗ denotes status of any incumbent, win or lose respectively.						
Party	Candidate	Votes	%	±%	Party votes	%	±%
CDU	Stefan Glaser	61,900	33.2	▲8.0	54,618	29.2	▲6.9
AfD	Marco Manuel Näger	32,848	17.6	▲9.5	33,960	18.2	▲10.0
SPD	Julian Alexander Wiedmann	32,288	17.3	▼4.4	29,798	16.0	▼8.3
Greens	Jasmin Ateia	29,238	15.7	▼4.9	28,450	15.2	▼3.8
Left	Marcell Menzel	11,325	6.1	▲3.4	12,651	6.8	▲2.6
FW	Dr. Christian Manfred Lehr	10,174	5.5	▼3.4	3,622	1.9	▲0.3
FDP	Amir Ismaili	5,810	3.1	▼11.1	9,156	4.9	▼9.4
BSW					8,345	4.5	
APT					2,005	1.1	▼0.4
Volt	Urs-Sebastian Schreiner	2,783	1.5		1,528	0.8	▲0.6
PARTEI					922	0.5	▼0.5
dieBasis					601	0.3	▼2.1
Bündnis C					508	0.3	▼0.1
ÖDP					351	0.2	Steady
BD					198	0.1	
MLPD					66	0.0	Steady
Informal votes		1,465			1,052		
Total valid votes		186,366			186,779		
Turnout		187,831	81.7	▲6.4			
Vacant gain from CDU	Majority						

=== 2021 election ===
Federal election (2021): Lörrach – Müllheim
Notes:	Blue background denotes the winner of the electorate vote. Pink background denotes a candidate elected from their party list. Yellow background denotes an electorate win by a list member, or other incumbent. A ✓ or ✗ denotes status of any incumbent, win or lose respectively.						
Party	Candidate	Votes	%	±%	Party votes	%	±%
CDU	Diana Stöcker	43,509	25.2	▼14.2	38,501	22.3	▼12.1
SPD	Takis Mehmet Ali	37,496	21.8	▲0.7	41,834	24.2	▲6.5
Greens	Gerhard Zickenheiner	35,558	20.6	▲5.7	32,817	19.0	▲3.6
FDP	Christoph Hoffmann	24,430	14.2	▲5.5	24,669	14.3	▲3.2
AfD	Martina Kempf	13,981	8.1	▼1.5	14,195	8.2	▼2.3
dieBasis	Juliane Prentice	4,799	2.8		4,136	2.4	
Left	Moritz Kenk	4,580	2.7	▼2.4	5,532	3.2	▼3.0
FW	Ulrich Kissel	3,530	2.0		2,784	1.6	▲0.9
Tierschutzpartei					2,479	1.4	▲0.5
PARTEI	Alexander Riesener	2,586	1.5		1,698	1.0	▲0.3
Pirates	Sabine Schumacher	1,009	0.6	▼0.5	734	0.4	▼0.1
Team Todenhöfer					676	0.4	
Bündnis C					592	0.3	
V-Partei³	Lea Viola Stocker	550	0.3				
Volt					454	0.3	
ÖDP					357	0.2	▼0.1
Gesundheitsforschung					228	0.1	
Bürgerbewegung					195	0.1	
DiB					164	0.1	▼0.1
NPD					150	0.1	▼0.2
Humanists					146	0.1	
MLPD	Zeki Ates	168	0.1		73	0.0	0.0
LKR	Severine Vollmer	148	0.1		63	0.0	
Bündnis 21					60	0.0	
DKP					32	0.0	0.0
Informal votes		1,720			1,495		
Total valid votes		172,344			172,569		
Turnout		174,064	75.3	▼1.1			
CDU hold	Majority	6,013	3.4	▼14.9			

=== 2017 election ===
Federal election (2017): Lörrach – Müllheim
Notes:	Blue background denotes the winner of the electorate vote. Pink background denotes a candidate elected from their party list. Yellow background denotes an electorate win by a list member, or other incumbent. A ✓ or ✗ denotes status of any incumbent, win or lose respectively.						
Party	Candidate	Votes	%	±%	Party votes	%	±%
CDU	✓ Armin Schuster	69,148	39.4	▼10.7	60,513	34.4	▼9.3
SPD	Jonas Hoffmann	36,986	21.1	▼3.6	31,249	17.8	▼4.0
Greens	Gerhard Zickenheiner (Note: Zickenheiner entered the Bundestag on the Greens list after the resignation of Gerhard Schick in January 2019.)	26,244	15.0	▲2.9	27,014	15.4	▲2.7
AfD	Wolfgang Fuhl	16,854	9.6	▲6.0	18,459	10.5	▲5.4
FDP	Christoph Hoffmann	15,271	8.7	▲6.3	19,449	11.1	▲5.4
Left	David Trunz	8,854	5.0	▲1.2	10,898	6.2	▲1.4
Tierschutzpartei					1,585	0.9	0.0
PARTEI					1,247	0.7	
FW					1,187	0.7	▲0.2
Pirates	Sabine Schumacher	1,958	1.1	▼1.2	879	0.5	▼1.7
BGE					544	0.3	
Tierschutzallianz					472	0.3	
ÖDP					469	0.3	0.0
NPD					419	0.2	▼0.6
DM					321	0.2	
DiB					276	0.2	
Menschliche Welt					273	0.2	
V-Partei³					208	0.1	
Independent	Zeki Ates	202	0.1				
MLPD					162	0.1	▲0.1
DIE RECHTE					56	0.0	
DKP					24	0.0	
Informal votes		1,882			1,695		
Total valid votes		175,517			175,704		
Turnout		177,399	76.4	▲4.7			
CDU hold	Majority	32,162	18.3	▼7.2			

=== 2013 election ===
Federal election (2013): Lörrach – Müllheim
Notes:	Blue background denotes the winner of the electorate vote. Pink background denotes a candidate elected from their party list. Yellow background denotes an electorate win by a list member, or other incumbent. A ✓ or ✗ denotes status of any incumbent, win or lose respectively.						
Party	Candidate	Votes	%	±%	Party votes	%	±%
CDU	✓ Armin Schuster	81,205	50.1	▲12.2	70,888	43.7	▲11.5
SPD	Thomas Mengel	39,902	24.6	▼7.6	35,328	21.8	▼0.3
Greens	Ina-Sophie Rosenthal	19,468	12.0	▲1.5	20,593	12.7	▼2.8
Left	Thomas Grein	6,305	3.9	▼2.1	7,856	4.8	▼2.2
AfD	Wolfgang Fuhl	5,819	3.6		8,267	5.1	
FDP	Tilo Levante	3,856	2.4	▼8.6	9,159	5.6	▼11.5
Pirates	Max Kehm	3,747	2.3		3,594	2.2	▲0.2
NPD	Andreas Boltze	1,741	1.1	▼0.3	1,412	0.9	0.0
Tierschutzpartei					1,393	0.9	▲0.1
FW					738	0.5	
PBC					590	0.4	▼0.3
REP					589	0.4	▼0.5
Volksabstimmung					514	0.3	0.0
RENTNER					457	0.3	
ÖDP					410	0.3	0.0
Party of Reason					151	0.1	
PRO					119	0.1	
BIG					70	0.0	
MLPD					50	0.0	0.0
BüSo					24	0.0	0.0
Informal votes		2,298			2,139		
Total valid votes		162,043			162,202		
Turnout		164,341	71.7	▲2.2			
CDU hold	Majority	41,303	25.5	▲19.8			

=== 2009 election ===
Federal election (2009): Lörrach – Müllheim
Notes:	Blue background denotes the winner of the electorate vote. Pink background denotes a candidate elected from their party list. Yellow background denotes an electorate win by a list member, or other incumbent. A ✓ or ✗ denotes status of any incumbent, win or lose respectively.						
Party	Candidate	Votes	%	±%	Party votes	%	±%
CDU	Armin Schuster	58,282	37.9	▼1.9	49,707	32.3	▼2.5
SPD	Jana Zirra	49,591	32.2	▼11.4	33,953	22.0	▼13.1
FDP	Paul Lauer	16,932	11.0	▲6.1	26,425	17.1	▲7.1
Greens	Karl Mennicken-Martensen	16,151	10.5	▲4.2	23,904	15.5	▲2.9
Left	Adelbert Ringwald	9,268	6.0	▲2.9	10,802	7.0	▲3.2
Pirates					3,116	2.0	
REP					1,333	0.9	▼0.1
NPD	Jürgen Fischinger	2,106	1.4	0.0	1,271	0.8	▼0.1
Tierschutzpartei					1,124	0.7	
PBC	Hans-Werner Kuchta	1,498	1.0	▲0.1	987	0.6	0.0
Volksabstimmung					508	0.3	
ÖDP					422	0.3	
DIE VIOLETTEN					322	0.2	
DVU					77	0.0	
MLPD					57	0.0	0.0
BüSo					55	0.0	0.0
ADM					51	0.0	
Informal votes		2,864			2,577		
Total valid votes		153,828			154,115		
Turnout		156,692	69.4	▼7.4			
CDU gain from SPD	Majority	8,691	5.7				

=== 2005 election ===
Federal election (2005):Lörrach – Müllheim
Notes:	Blue background denotes the winner of the electorate vote. Pink background denotes a candidate elected from their party list. Yellow background denotes an electorate win by a list member, or other incumbent. A ✓ or ✗ denotes status of any incumbent, win or lose respectively.						
Party	Candidate	Votes	%	±%	Party votes	%	±%
SPD	✓ Marion Caspers-Merk	72,553	43.7	▼1.8	58,577	35.1	▼3.6
CDU	Dorothea Störr-Ritter	66,109	39.8	▼0.2	57,872	34.7	▼1.4
Greens	Axel de Frenne	10,474	6.3	▼0.8	20,989	12.6	▼0.9
FDP	Paul Lauer	8,070	4.9	▲0.1	16,674	10.0	▲2.7
Left	Günter Gent	5,116	3.1	▲1.6	6,372	3.8	▲2.7
NPD	Peter Deckert	2,300	1.4		1,491	0.9	▲0.7
REP					1,630	1.0	▲0.1
PBC	Hans-Werner Kuchta	1,519	0.9	▼0.2	1,128	0.7	0.0
Familie					1,052	0.6	
GRAUEN					735	0.4	▲0.3
MLPD					124	0.1	
BüSo					102	0.1	
Informal votes		3,411			2,806		
Total valid votes		166,141			166,746		
Turnout		169,552	76.8	▼2.2			
SPD hold	Majority	6,444	3.9				
