= Takis Mehmet Ali =

German politician (born 1991)

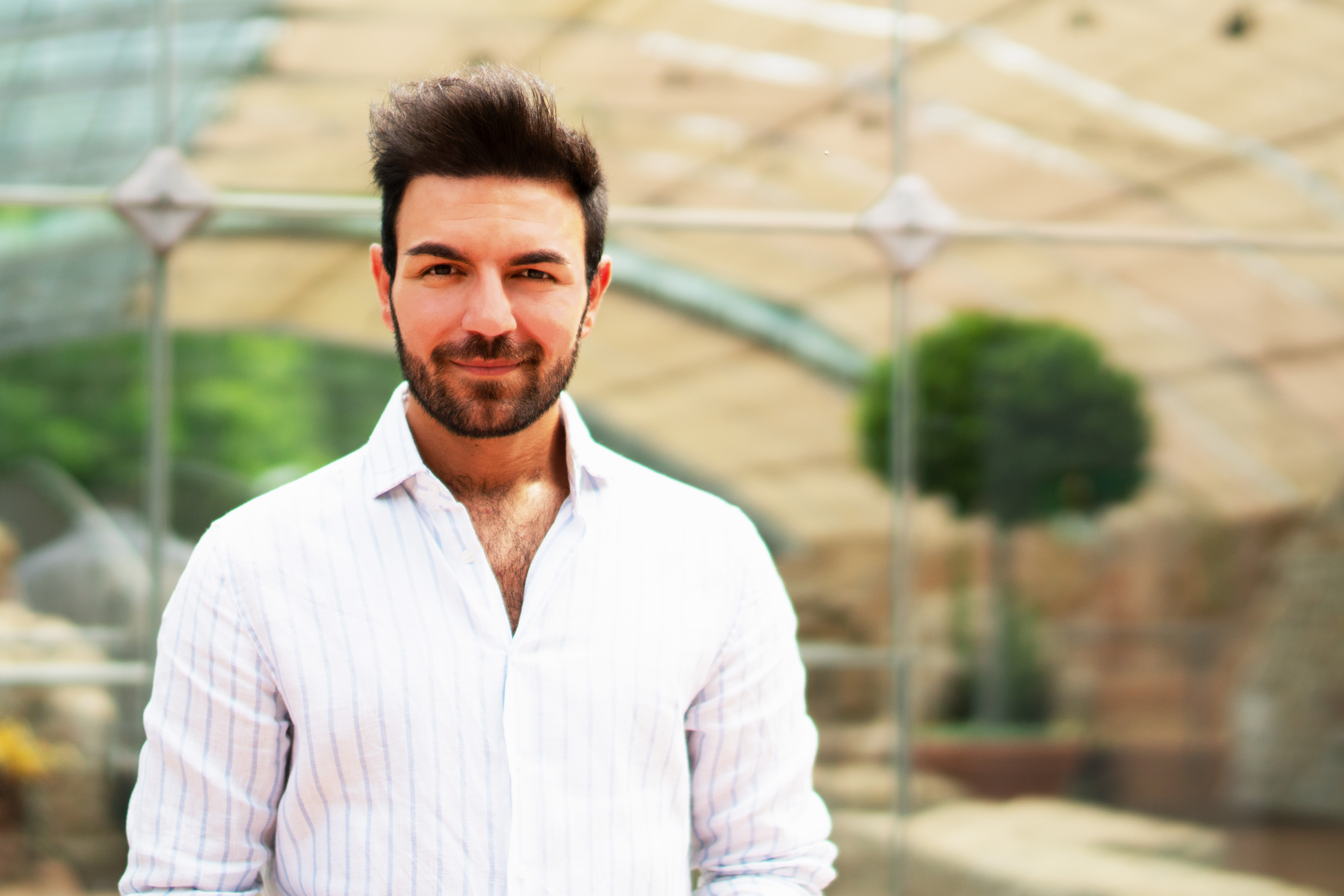
- Mehmet Ali in 2021

Member of the Bundestag
- In office 26 October 2021 – 31 December 2024
- Succeeded by: Lucia Schanbacher

Personal details
- Born: 17 June 1991 (age 34) Oberhausen
- Party: Social Democratic Party of Germany

Takis Mehmet Ali (born 17 June 1991 in Oberhausen) is a German politician who was a Member of the Bundestag for the Social Democratic Party of Germany.

== Political career ==
In the 2021 German federal election, Ali contested Lörrach – Müllheim but lost to Diana Stöcker from the Christian Democratic Union. He was number 22 on the state list in Baden-Württemberg and was entitled to sit in the Bundestag.

In parliament, Ali served on the Committee on Petitions and the Committee on Labour and Social Affairs.

== Other activities ==
- Bundesarbeitsgemeinschaft Inklusionsfirmen (BAG IF), Member of the Advisory Board

== Personal life ==
Mehmet Ali's parents immigrated to Germany from Greece and Turkey in the 1980s. He is single and resides in Badenweiler. He is a Greek Orthodox Christian. He came out as gay in 2021.
