= Lucia Schanbacher =

German politician (born 1989)

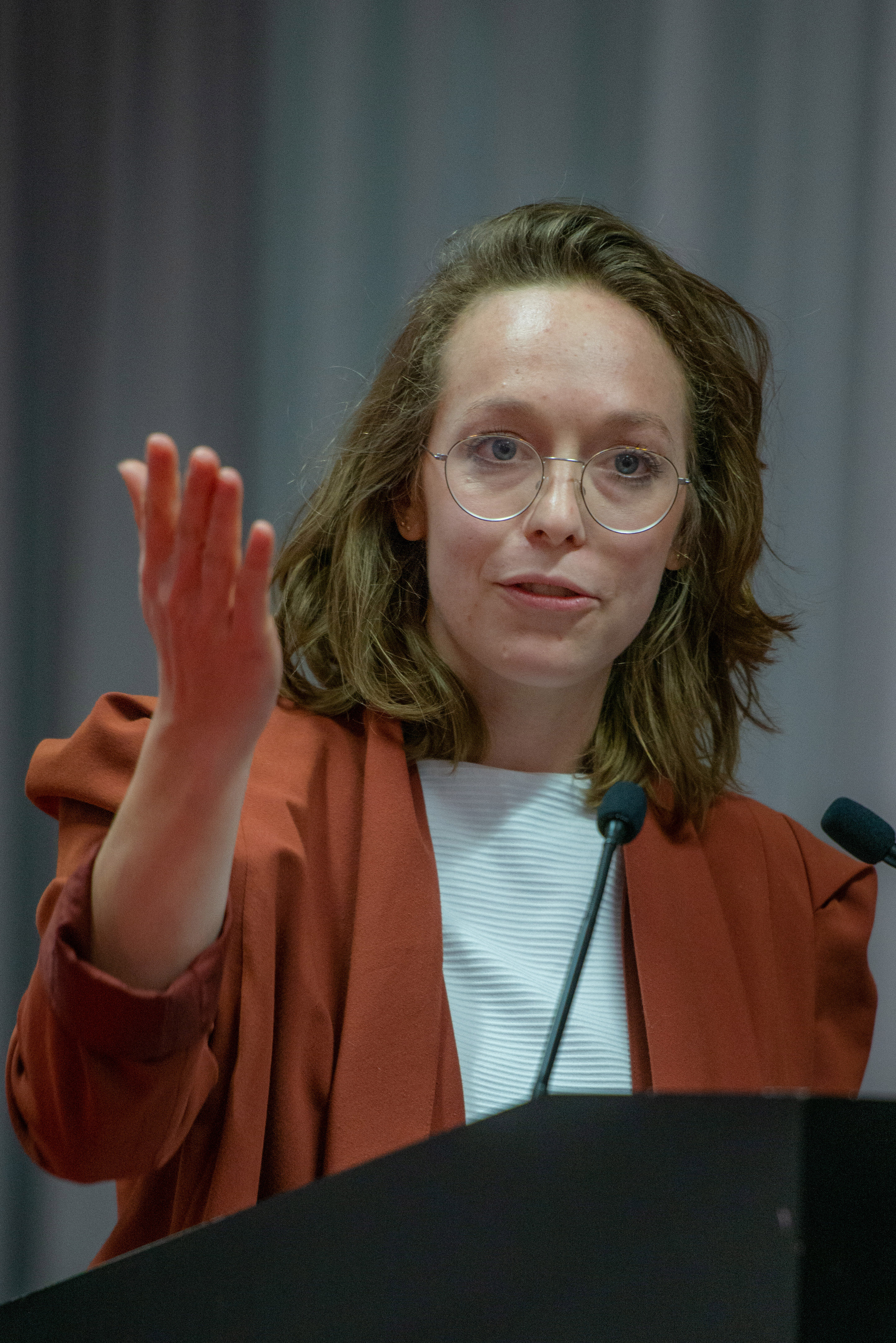
- Lucia Schanbacher in 2018

Member of the Bundestag
- Incumbent
- Assumed office January 2025
- Preceded by: Takis Mehmet Ali

Personal details
- Born: 12 November 1989 (age 36) Göppingen
- Party: Social Democratic Party of Germany

Anna Lucia "Lucy" Schanbacher (born 12 November 1989) is a German politician from the Social Democratic Party. She has been a Member of the German Bundestag since January 2025.

== Life ==
Schanbacher grew up in Adelberg. After graduating from Burg-Gymnasium Schorndorf, she began a bachelor's degree in communication science with a focus on political communication and public relations at the University of Hohenheim in 2009. From 2011, she was deputy chair of the General Student Committee. Schanbacher completed her master's degree from 2013 to 2015 at the University of Konstanz and the Pompeu Fabra University. She obtained a European Master in Government (double degree).

After completing her studies, Schanbacher initially worked as a research assistant for members of the Bundestag Martin Rosemann and Katja Mast. From 2017 to 2024, she worked as a research assistant for member of the state parliament Boris Weirauch.

Schanbacher lives with her partner and their son in Stuttgart.

== Political career ==
Schanbacher is a member of the SPD. Since 2019 she has been a city councillor in the Stuttgart city council. Since 2022 she has been a member of the state executive committee of the SPD Baden-Württemberg.

In the 2021 German federal election, Schanbacher ran in the Stuttgart I constituency and in 23rd place on the SPD state list in Baden-Württemberg, but initially missed out on a place in the Bundestag. She replaced Takis Mehmet Ali in the Bundestag on 1 January 2025.

In the 2025 German federal election, Schanbacher will be ranked 15th on the SPD state list and will again be running in the Stuttgart I constituency.
