= Natterer =

Natterer may refer to:

People

- Christian Natterer (born 1981), German politician
- August Natterer (1868–1933), German artist
- Frank Natterer (born 1941), German mathematics professor
- Johann Natterer (1787–1843), Austrian explorer and naturalist

Other

- Natterer's bat, Myotis nattereri
