= Lambert Schill =

German politician (1888–1976)

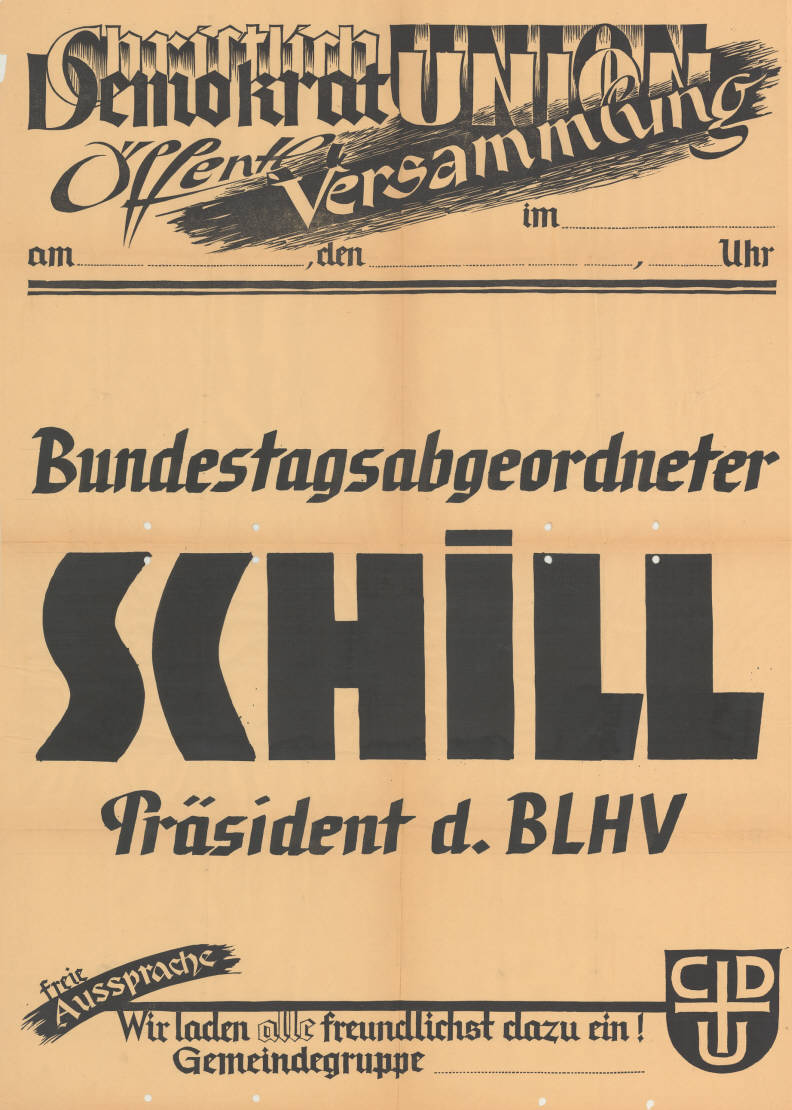
- CDU announcement poster for Schill

Member of the Bundestag; for Lörrach
- In office 7 September 1949 – 6 October 1957
- Preceded by: Constituency established
- Succeeded by: Herbert Wolff

Personal details
- Born: 7 July 1888 Merzhausen, Germany
- Died: 13 December 1976 (aged 88) Merzhausen, West Germany
- Party: Christian Democratic Union
- Children: 14

Lambert Schill (7 July 1888 – 13 December 1976) was a German politician of the Christian Democratic Union (CDU) and former member of the German Bundestag.

== Life ==
He had been a member of the German Bundestag since its first election from 1949 to 1957. As a directly elected member of parliament he represented the constituency of Lörrach.

== Literature ==
Herbst, Ludolf; Jahn, Bruno (2002). Vierhaus, Rudolf (ed.). Biographisches Handbuch der Mitglieder des Deutschen Bundestages. 1949–2002 [Biographical Handbook of the Members of the German Bundestag. 1949–2002] (in German). München: De Gruyter - De Gruyter Saur. p. 1715. ISBN 978-3-11-184511-1.
