= Marion Caspers-Merk =

German politician (born 1955)

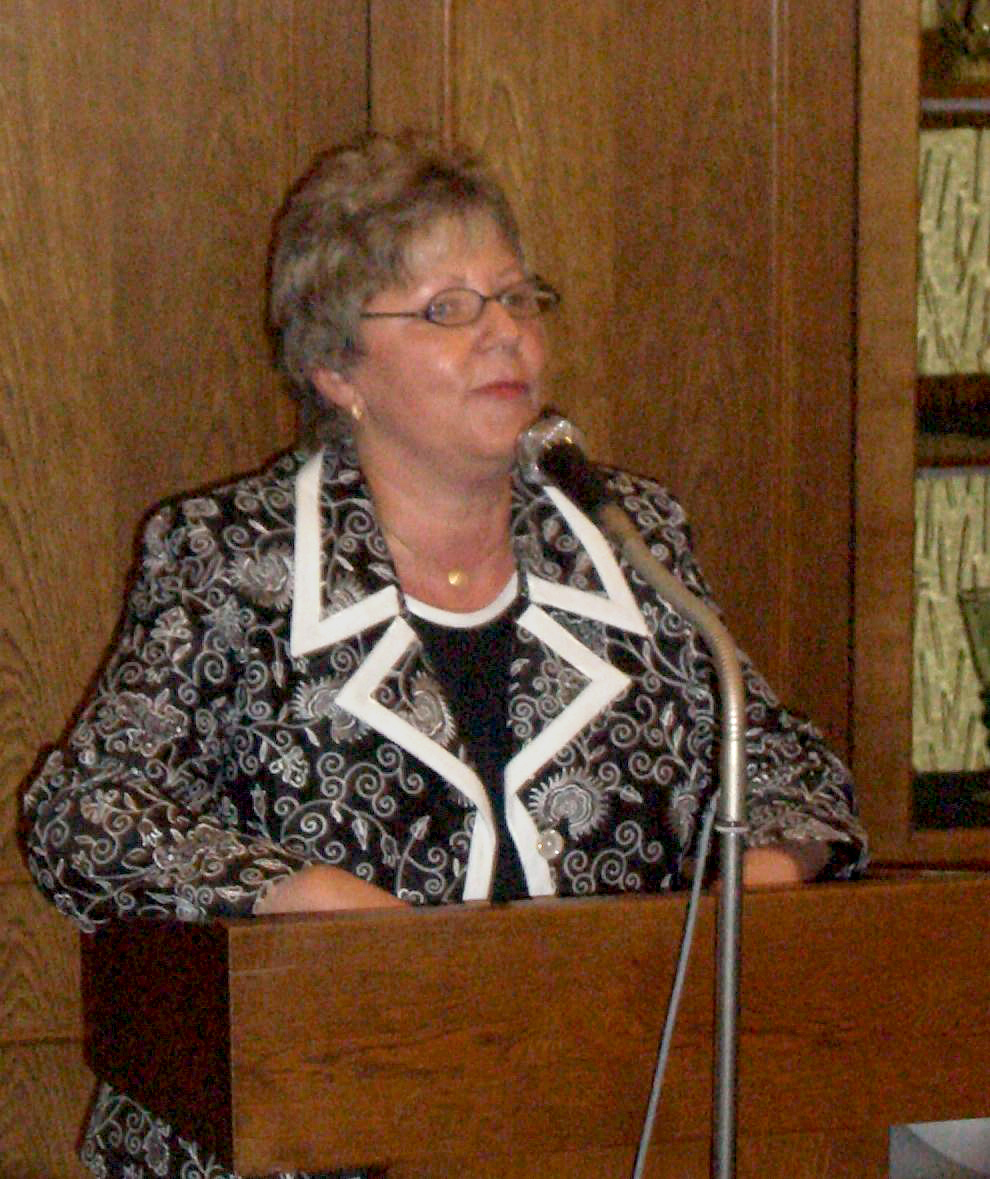
- Caspers-Merk in 2005

Member of the Bundestag; from Baden-Württemberg
- In office 20 December 1990 – 27 October 2009
- Preceded by: Multi-member district
- Succeeded by: Armin Schuster
- Constituency: State list (1990–1998); Lörrach – Müllheim (1998–2009)

Personal details
- Born: 24 April 1955 (age 71) Mannheim, West Germany
- Party: Social Democratic
- Education: Free University of Berlin; University of Freiburg

Marion Caspers-Merk (born 24 April 1955) is a German politician and member of the Social Democratic Party of Germany (SPD). She was a member of the Bundestag, representing Lörrach – Müllheim, and Parliamentary State Secretary at the Federal Ministry of Health. Alongside other prominent figures such as Kofi Annan and Javier Solana, Caspers-Merk served on the Global Commission on Drug Policy which advocates reforms in drug policies towards the regulation of all substances.
