= Stefan Glaser =

German politician (born 1990)

Stefan Glaser MdB

Member of the Bundestag; for Lörrach – Müllheim
- Incumbent
- Assumed office 27 May 2026
- Preceded by: Andreas Jung

Personal details
- Born: 17 March 1990 (age 36) Lörrach, West Germany
- Party: Christian Democratic Union (since 2010)
- Education: Baden-Württemberg Cooperative State University

Stefan Glaser (born 17 March 1990) is a German politician of the Christian Democratic Union (CDU) who has been serving as a member of the Bundestag since 2026, representing the Lörrach – Müllheim district.

== Early life and education ==
Glaser grew up on his family's farm in Steinen-Hägelberg. He obtained his high school degree from Theodor-Heuss-Gymnasium in Schopfheim in 2009.

From 2012 to 2015, Glaser completed a dual degree programme in industrial engineering at the Horb am Neckar campus of the Baden-Württemberg Cooperative State University (DHBW Stuttgart) and at Daimler's Mercedes-Benz plant in Sindelfingen. He graduated with a Bachelor of Engineering. He later studied Business Law at the German Graduate School of Management and Law (GGS) from 2015 to 2017, graduating with a Master of Laws.

From 2015 to 2020, Glaser held various positions in strategic marketing and product strategy in the Mercedes-Benz passenger-car division of Daimler. From 2020 to 2022, he worked in business development at BRUSA HyPower AG in Buchs, St. Gallen. From 2022 until 2026, he was Senior Manager Business Development and Strategy at RUAG in Emmen, Switzerland.

Glaser has lived in Steinen again since 2024.

== Political career ==
Glaser has been a member of the Christian Democratic Union (CDU) since 2010. Since 2012, he has been a member of the executive board of the CDU municipal association of Steinen-Kleines Wiesental. In 2024, he became chairman of the CDU district association of Lörrach. He is also a member of the Steinen municipal council.

In May 2026, Glaser entered the German Parliament as the successor to Andreas Jung who had resigned his seat. In parliament, he has since been serving on the Committee on the Environment, Nature Conservation, Nuclear Safety and Consumer Protection and the Committee on Digital Transformation and Government Modernisation.
