= Karl August Bühler =

German politician (1904–1984)

Member of the Bundestag; from Baden-Württemberg
- In office 15 October 1957 – 19 October 1969
- Preceded by: Multi-member district
- Succeeded by: Heinz Eyrich
- Constituency: State list (1957–1961); Lörrach (1961–1965); Lörrach – Müllheim (1965–1969)

Member of the; Landtag of Baden-Württemberg; for Lörrach
- In office 4 April 1956 – 12 January 1958
- Preceded by: Seat established
- Succeeded by: Franz Dietsche

Personal details
- Born: 26 February 1904 Ottenheim, Germany
- Died: 7 January 1984 (aged 79) Lörrach, West Germany
- Party: Christian Democratic Union
- Education: University of Tübingen; Heidelberg University

Karl August Bühler (2 February 1904 – 7 January 1984) was a German politician of the Christian Democratic Union (CDU) and former member of the German Bundestag.

== Life ==
Bühler participated in the establishment of the CDU in Thuringia. After his escape, he became involved in the Baden CDU, where he was deputy CDU state chairman. He was a member of the state parliament in Baden-Württemberg from 1956. On 12 January 1958, he resigned his mandate. His successor became Franz Dietsche. He was a member of the German Bundestag from 1957 to 1969.

== Literature ==
Herbst, Ludolf; Jahn, Bruno (2002). Vierhaus, Rudolf (ed.). Biographisches Handbuch der Mitglieder des Deutschen Bundestages. 1949–2002 [Biographical Handbook of the Members of the German Bundestag. 1949–2002] (in German). München: De Gruyter - De Gruyter Saur. p. 1715. ISBN 978-3-11-184511-1.
