= Staatliche Baderverwaltung Badenweiler =

Historical Arboretum in Germany

Coordinates: 47.8029°N 7.6681°E

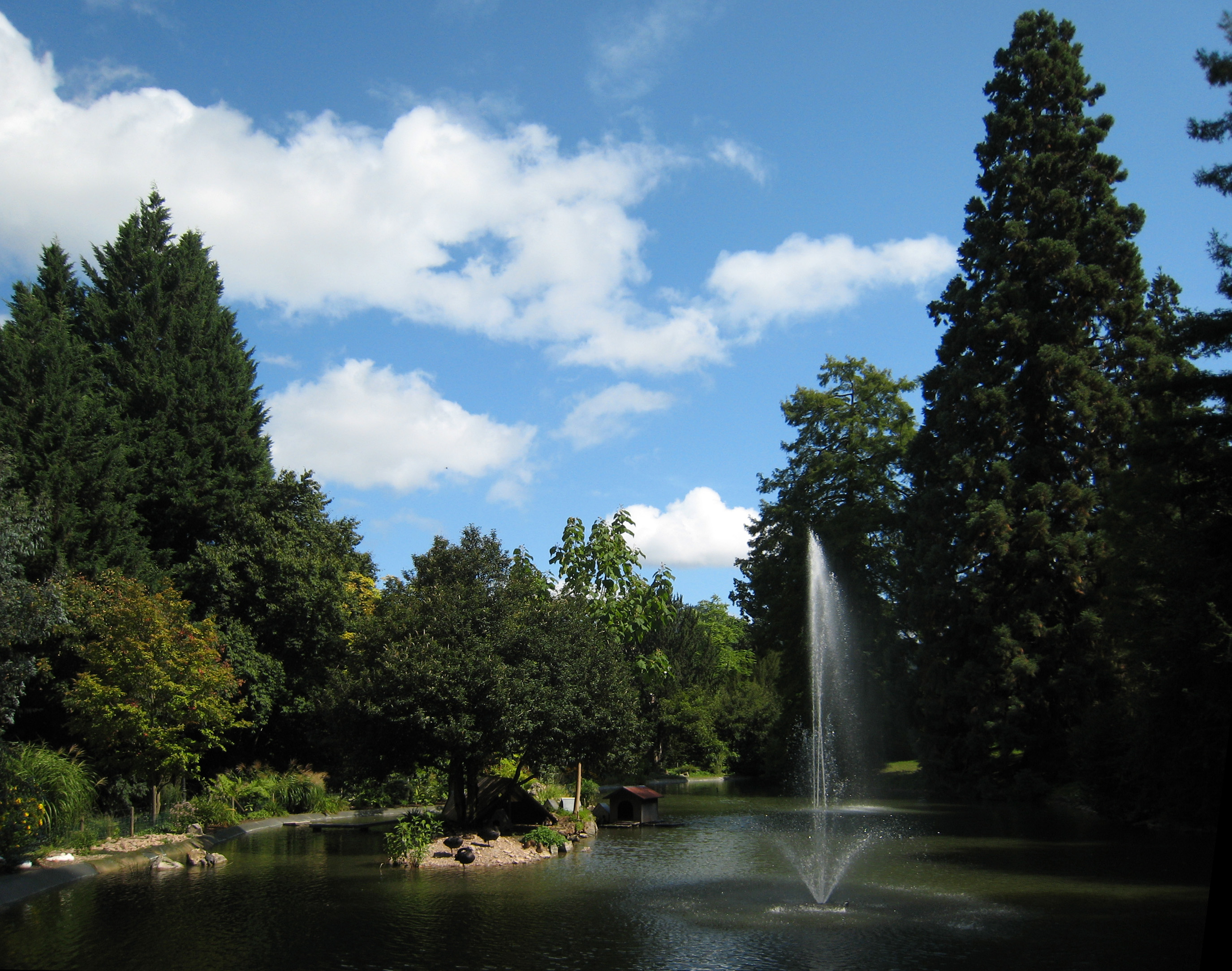
Kurpark, Badenweiler

The Staatliche Baderverwaltung Badenweiler (12 hectares) is a historic arboretum located in the city Kurpark at Kaiserstrasse 5, Badenweiler, Baden-Württemberg, Germany. It is open daily without charge.

The arboretum dates to 1758 when Charles Frederick, Grand Duke of Baden, planted a walnut allée along the hill with its Roman ruins, which was subsequently extended in 1824–1828 by Johann Michael Hofrat Zeyher (1770–1843) to create a small landscape garden. The current Kurpark and arboretum, however, are primarily the work of Ernst Kraut Inger (1824–1898), Grand Ducal Park Director from 1850 to 1897, who collected trees from around the world to create an English landscape park. Many of today's trees date to this period, as do garden features such as swan ponds.

Today the garden contains extensive plantings of exotic trees, including mature sequoias, cedars, palm trees, eucalyptus, bananas, lemons, oleanders, hibiscus, and magnolias, as well as fine specimens of Prunus, Quercus, Rosa, Sorbus and Viburnum species and varietals.

== See also ==
- List of botanical gardens in Germany
