= Armin Schuster =

German politician (born 1961)

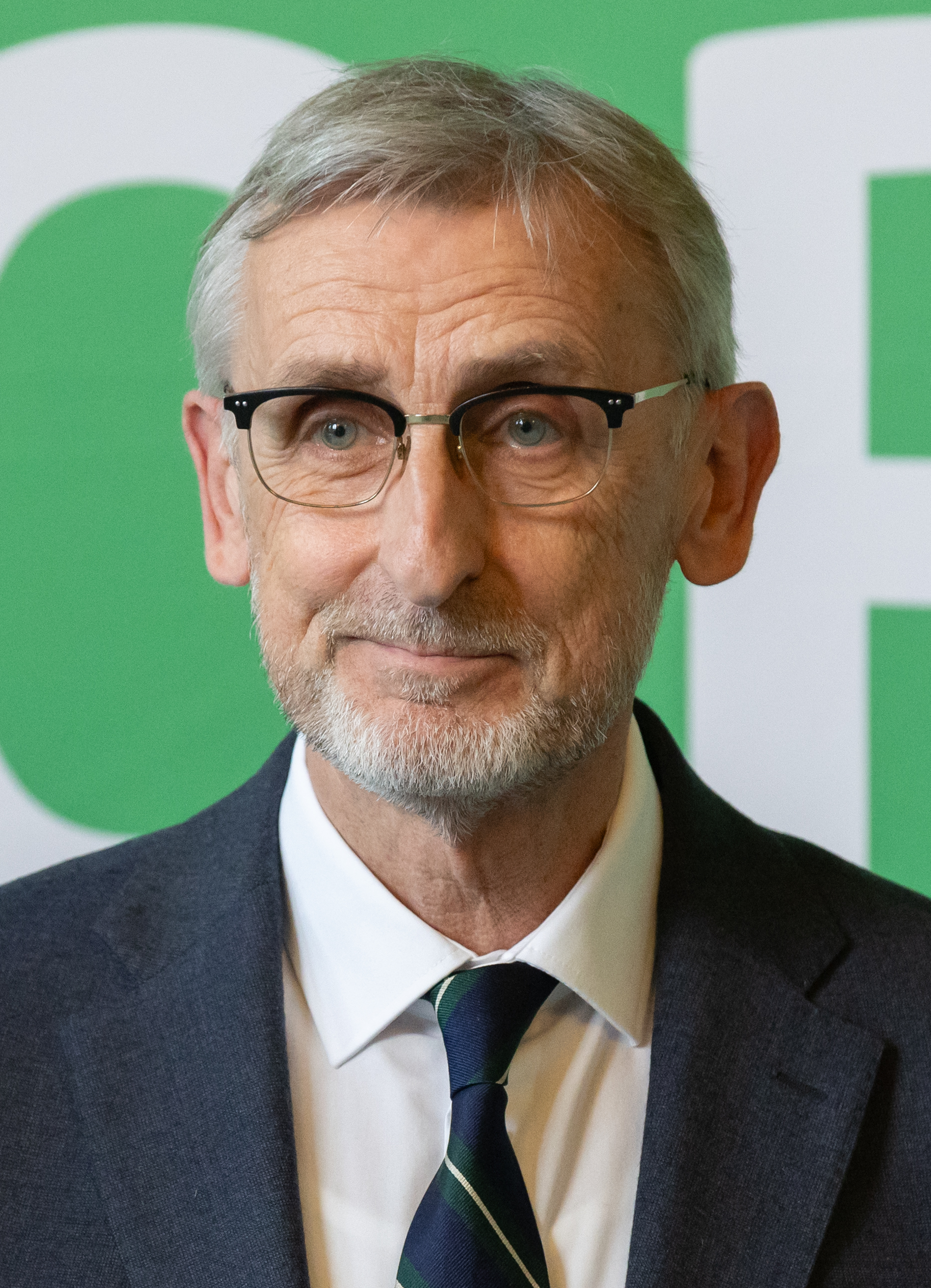
- Schuster in 2026

State Minister of the Interior of Saxony
- Incumbent
- Assumed office 22 April 2022
- Minister-President: Michael Kretschmer
- Preceded by: Roland Wöller

President of the Federal Office for Civil Protection and Disaster Assistance
- In office 10 November 2020 – 22 April 2022
- Minister: Horst Seehofer; Nancy Faeser
- Vice President: Thomas Herzog
- Preceded by: Christoph Unger
- Succeeded by: Ralph Tiesler

Chair of the Breitscheidplatz truck attack Inquiry Committee
- In office 1 March 2018 – 26 September 2019
- Deputy: Mahmut Özdemir
- Preceded by: Position established
- Succeeded by: Klaus-Dieter Gröhler

Chair of the Parliamentary Oversight Panel
- In office 18 January 2018 – 5 November 2020
- Deputy: Konstantin von Notz
- Preceded by: Clemens Binninger
- Succeeded by: Roderich Kiesewetter

Member of the Bundestag; for Lörrach – Müllheim
- In office 27 October 2009 – 9 November 2020
- Preceded by: Marion Caspers-Merk
- Succeeded by: Christian Natterer

Personal details
- Born: 20 May 1961 (age 65) Andernach, Rhineland-Palatinate, West Germany (now Germany)
- Citizenship: German
- Party: Christian Democratic Union (since 1987)
- Children: 1
- Education: Hochschule des Bundes für öffentliche Verwaltung; University of Hagen; Deutsche Hochschule der Polizei
- Occupation: Politician; Police officer; Civil Servant; Docent

Armin Schuster (born 20 May 1961) is a German politician. A member of the Christian Democratic Union (CDU), Schuster has been serving as State Minister of Internal Affairs in the government of Minister-President Michael Kretschmer since 2022.

Schuster was the president of the Federal Office of Civil Protection and Disaster Assistance (BBK) from 2020 to 2022 and a Member of the Bundestag from 2009 to 2020.

== Education and early career ==
Schuster was born in Andernach. From 1980 to 1983, he attended the Federal College of Public Administration in Cologne and Lübeck. From 1983 to 1986, he worked for the Federal Border Police in Brunswick. From 1986 to 1992, he studied economics at the Fernuniversität Hagen, and he subsequently passed the career certificate for the higher service at the college of police in Münster.

At the same time, Schuster worked in the Federal Ministry of the Interior between 1985 and 1989. From 1999 to 2002, he was a lecturer at the Federal University of Applied Sciences and Head of Quality Management in Lübeck. Afterwards, he served as Deputy Head of the Federal Police Office Frankfurt (Oder). From 2004 to 2009, Schuster then headed as police director of the Federal Police Office Weil am Rhein. Schuster is also European Quality System Manager and Auditor Senior Quality Manager.

== Political career ==
Schuster has been a member of the CDU since 1987. From October 2009 to 2012, he was deputy chairman, and since 2012 has been chairman of the Lörrach CDU district association. In February 2018, Schuster relinquished the district presidency.

=== Member of the German Parliament, 2009–2020 ===
From the 2009 elections Schuster served as a member of the German Bundestag for the constituency of Lörrach – Müllheim, regularly winning the direct mandate; in the 17th legislature, he was also a member of the Committee on Internal Affairs. He was re-elected at the 2013 federal election. In the 18th Bundestag he was chairman of the Committee on Internal Affairs a member of the Parliamentary Oversight Panel (PKGr). From the year 2015 until the end of the legislative period Schuster was also chairman of the CDU/CSU parliamentary group in the 3rd Committee of Inquiry for the NSU case.

Schuster was directly elected to the German Bundestag on 24 September 2017 for the third time. In the 19th electoral term, he again assumed the function of chairman of the CDU/CSU parliamentary group in the Committee on Internal Affairs. He was also elected chairman of the PKGr. In addition, he was elected as chairman of the first committee of inquiry on the 2016 Berlin truck attack, which is charged with investigating the circumstances of the terrorist attack of 19 December 2016 and, if necessary, drawing conclusions.

In the negotiations to form a fourth coalition government under Chancellor Angela Merkel following the 2017 federal elections, Schuster was part of the working group on migration policy, led by Volker Bouffier, Joachim Herrmann and Ralf Stegner. In 2018, news media reported that Schuster had been Minister Horst Seehofer's preferred choice to succeed Hans-Georg Maaßen as President of the Federal Office for the Protection of the Constitution; however, Chancellor Merkel reportedly vetoed the appointment. Shortly after, in a vote on the successor of Stephan Harbarth as deputy chairman of the CDU/CSU parliamentary group, he lost out against Thorsten Frei.

In addition to his committee work, each year Schuster awarded a scholarship under the Parliamentary Sponsorship Program to students or young professionals in his constituency.

=== Career in state politics ===
In the negotiations to form a Grand Coalition under the leadership of Friedrich Merz's Christian Democrats (CDU together with the Bavarian CSU) and the Social Democratic Party (SPD) following the 2025 German elections, Warken was part of the CDU/CSU delegation in the working group on domestic policy, legal affairs, migration and integration, led by Günter Krings, Andrea Lindholz and Dirk Wiese.

== Political positions ==
During the European refugee crisis in autumn 2015 and afterwards, Schuster became one of the most outspoken CDU internal critics of Chancellor Angela Merkel. In June 2017, he voted against Germany's introduction of same-sex marriage.

Ahead of the Christian Democrats' leadership election, Schuster publicly endorsed in 2020 Jens Spahn to succeed Annegret Kramp-Karrenbauer as the party's chair.

== Other activities ==
- German Association for Quality (DGQ), Member of the Board
- International Police Association (IPA), Member
- German Police Trade Union (DPolG), Member
- Ludwig Erhard Prize, Honorary Member of the Jury

== Personal life ==
Schuster is married, has an adult daughter with his wife and lives in Weil am Rhein-Haltingen.
