= Christian Natterer =

German politician

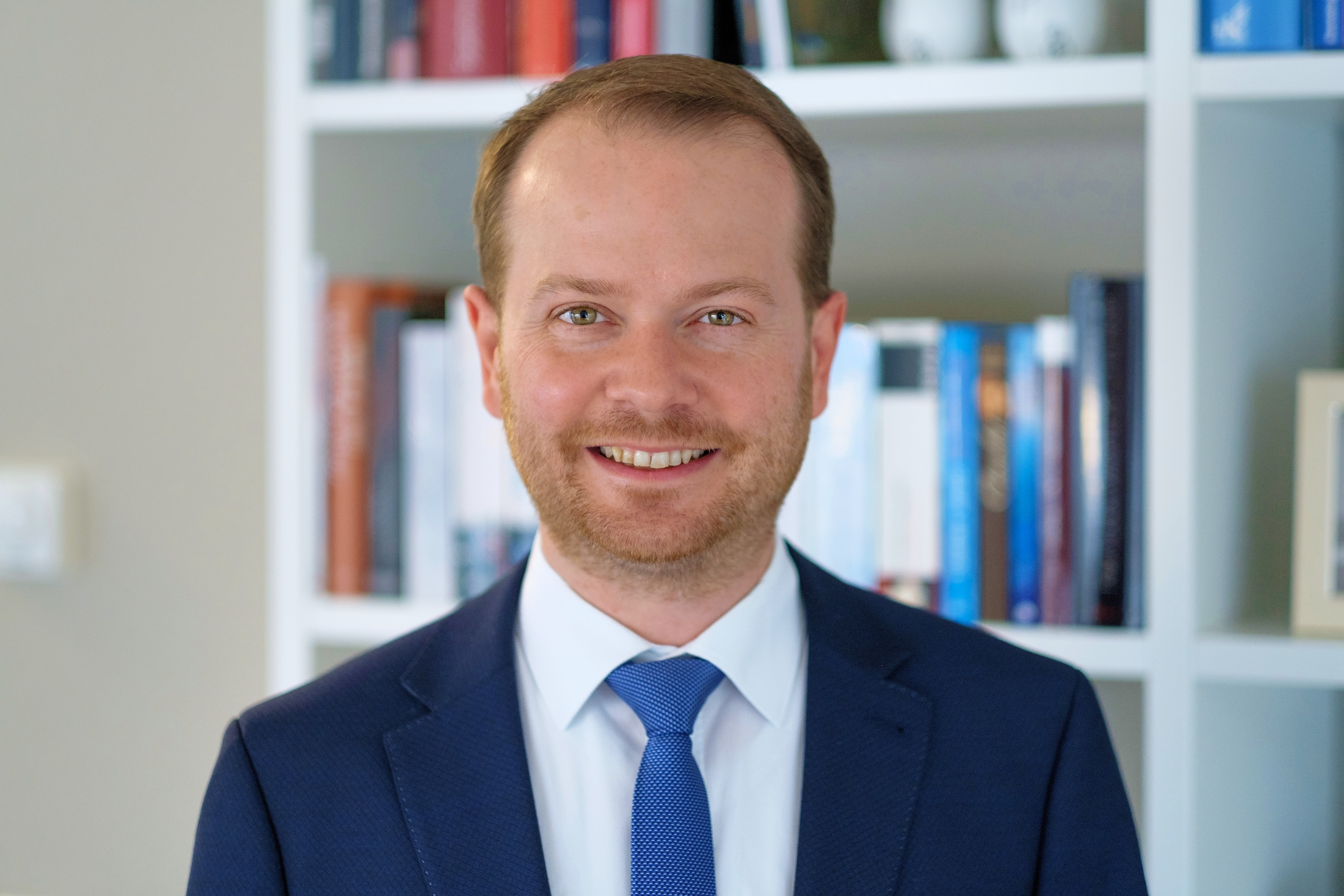
- Natterer in 2022

Member of the Bundestag; for Lörrach – Müllheim
- In office 11 November 2020 – 26 October 2021
- Preceded by: Armin Schuster
- Succeeded by: Diana Stöcker

Personal details
- Born: 19 February 1981 (age 45) Tettnang, West Germany
- Party: Christian Democratic Union
- Children: 2
- Relatives: Frank Natterer (uncle)
- Education: University of Freiburg; University of Augsburg

Christian Natterer (born 19 February 1981) is a German politician of the Christian Democratic Union (CDU).

== Political career ==
Natterer became a member of the German Bundestag as a successor to Armin Schuster in November 2020. He is a member of the Committee on European Union Affairs.
