= Gerhard Zickenheiner =

German politician (born 1964)

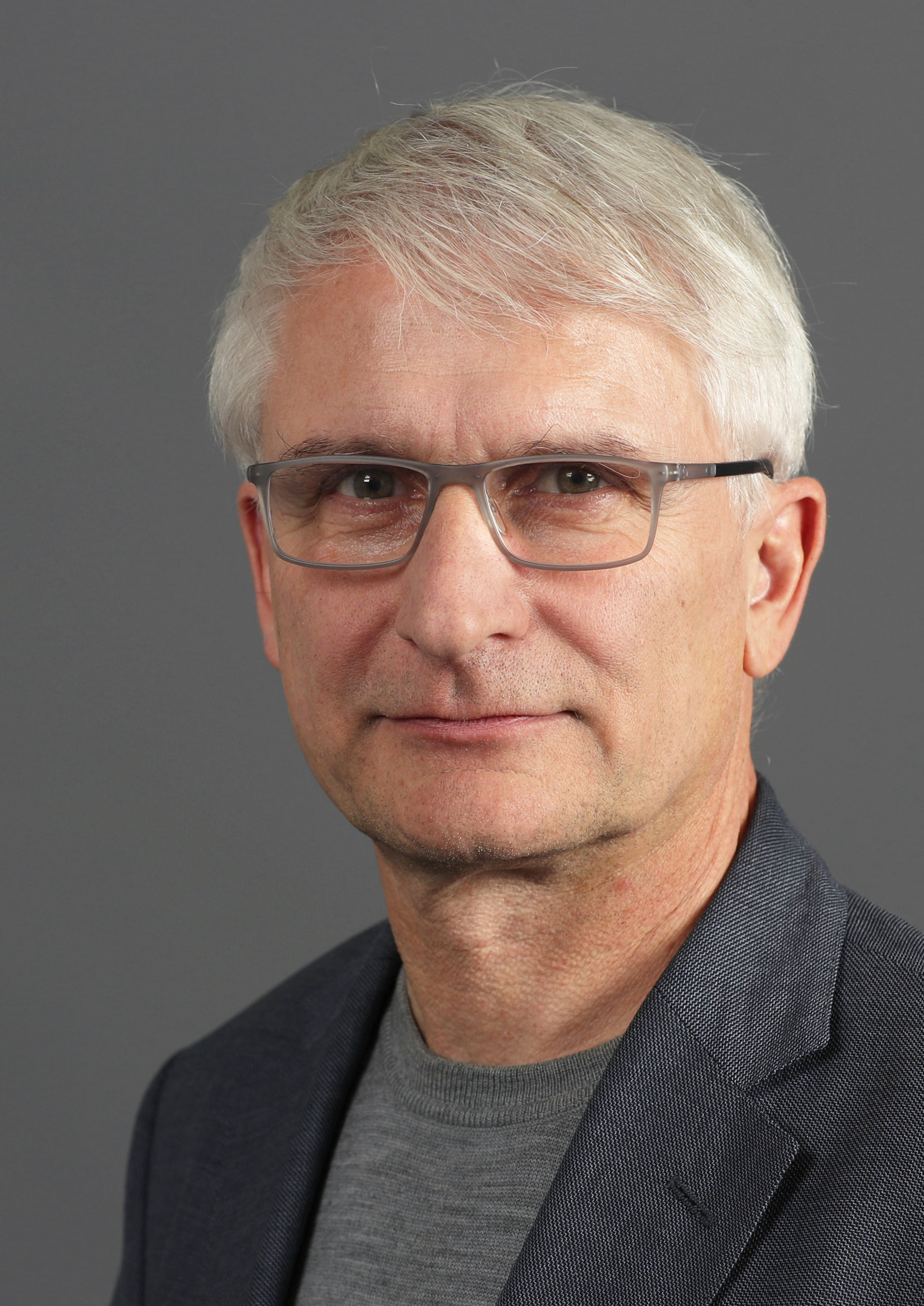
- Gerhard Zickenheiner in 2020

Member of the Bundestag
- In office 2019–2021

Personal details
- Born: 1 April 1961 (age 65) Lörrach, West Germany (now Germany)
- Party: Greens
- Children: 2

Gerhard Zickenheiner (born 1 April 1964) is a German architect and politician of Alliance 90/The Greens who served as a member of the Bundestag from the state of Baden-Württemberg from 2019 to 2021.

== Early life and education ==
Zickenheiner obtained the general qualification for university entrance in Lörrach and then studied architecture in Karlsruhe and Stuttgart, graduating with a diploma (FH). He then studied architecture at the E.T.S.A.B Barcelona and conceptual design at Städelschule in Frankfurt and graduated as a master student with Enric Miralles. He also completed a master's degree in "Community, Urban and Regional Development" at the Hochschule für Soziale Arbeit in Lucerne.

== Political career ==
On 1 January 2019, Zickenheiner took over the Bundestag mandate from Gerhard Schick. He was a member of the Committee on European Affairs.
