= Boris Weirauch =

German politician (born 1977)

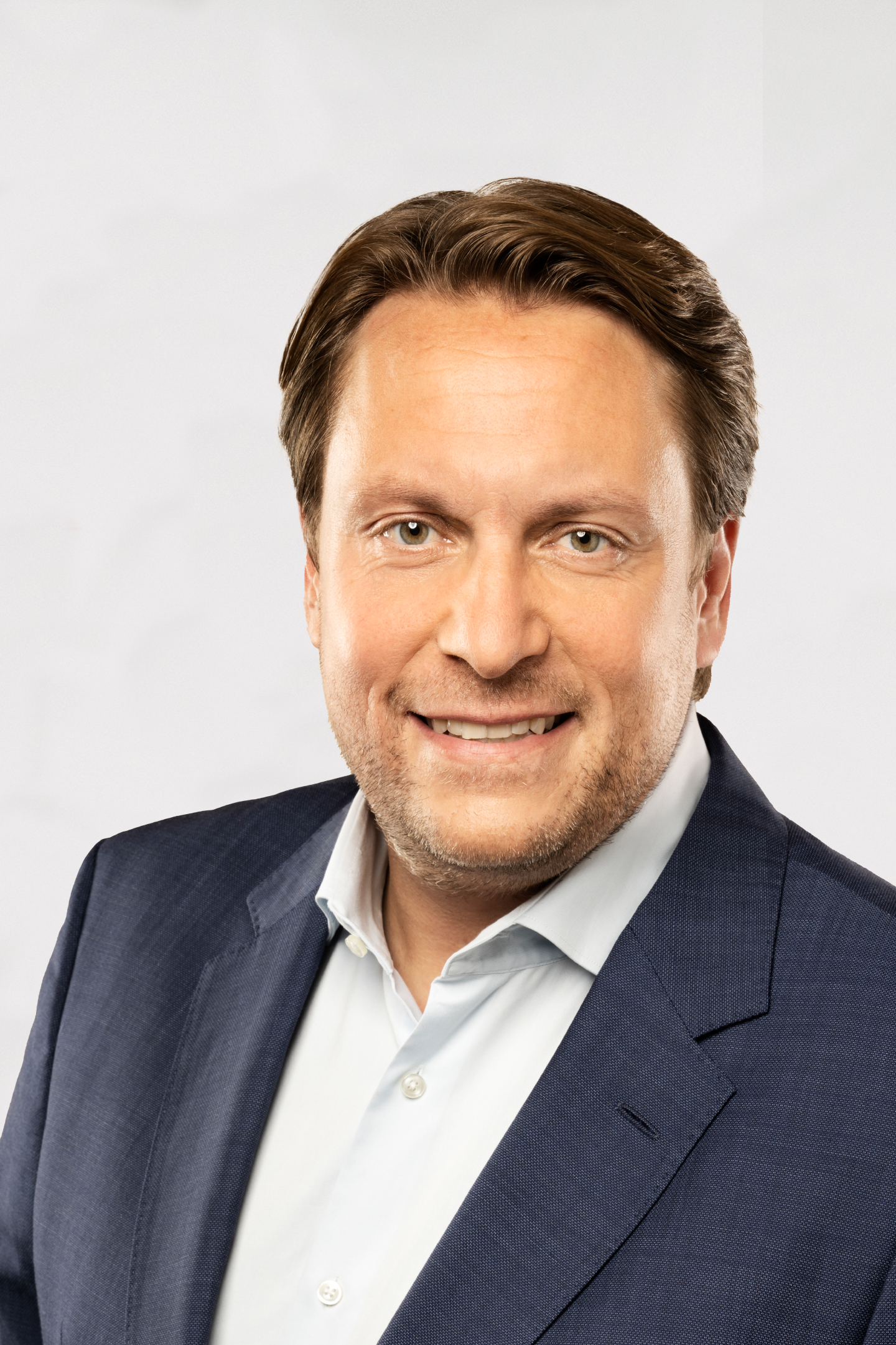
- Weirauch in 2021

Member of the Landtag of Baden-Württemberg
- Incumbent
- Assumed office 11 May 2016
- Constituency: Mannheim II

Personal details
- Born: 3 February 1977 (age 49) Ludwigshafen
- Party: Social Democratic Party (since 1999)

Boris Weirauch (born 3 February 1977 in Ludwigshafen) is a German politician serving as a member of the Landtag of Baden-Württemberg since 2016. From 2009 to 2019, he was a city councillor of Mannheim.
