= Diana Stöcker =

German politician from the CDU

Diane Stöcker
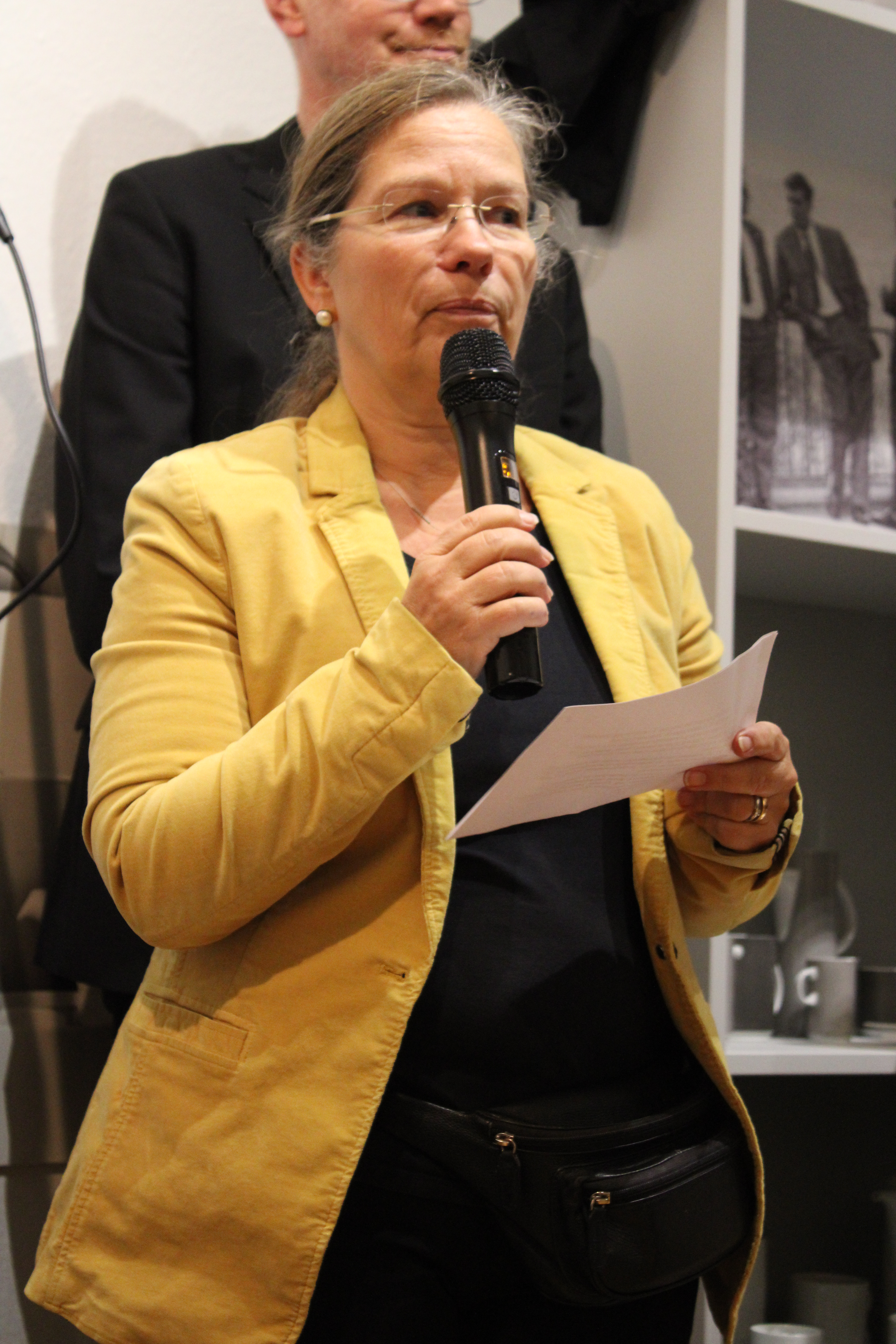
- Stöcker in 2024

Member of the Bundestag; for Lörrach – Müllheim
- In office 26 October 2021 – 2 June 2024
- Preceded by: Christian Natterer
- Succeeded by: Ingo Wellenreuther

Personal details
- Born: 19 May 1970 (age 56) Karlsruhe, West Germany
- Party: Christian Democratic Union
- Children: 1
- Education: Saarland University; Newcastle University

Diana Stöcker (born 19 May 1970) is a German politician of the Christian Democratic Union (CDU) who has been the Member of the German Bundestag for Lörrach – Müllheim from 2021 to June 2024. Since June 2024, she is mayor of Weil am Rhein.

== Education ==
Stöcker graduated from Saarland University and Newcastle University.
