= Christoph Hoffmann (politician) =

German politician (born 1957)

Member of the Bundestag
- In office 2017–2025

Personal details
- Born: 9 December 1957 (age 68) Schliengen, Germany
- Party: FDP
- Education: University of Freiburg; University of California, Berkeley; University of Göttingen
- Occupation: Forest scientists

Christoph Hoffmann (born 9 December 1957) is a German politician of the Free Democratic Party (FDP) who served as a member of the Bundestag from the state of Baden-Württemberg from 2017 to 2025.

== Early life and career ==
Hoffmann studied forestry sciences at the University of Freiburg after graduating from high school in 1977. He graduated with a diploma in forestry in 1983, and then completed his preparatory service for a forestry career with the state of Baden-Württemberg in 1985. After completing his doctoral studies in forest genetics at the University of California, Berkeley, Hoffmann was awarded his doctorate at the University of Göttingen in 1994.

From 1995 until 1997, Hoffmann worked for GIZ in Ivory Coast. He was subsequently employed in various projects and positions in the Baden-Württemberg forest administration.

== Political career ==
In 2007, Hoffmann was elected mayor of the community of Bad Bellingen in the Markgräflerland region and re-elected in 2015.

Hoffmann became member of the Bundestag in the 2017 German federal election. In parliament, he was a member of the Committee on Economic Cooperation and Development and the Parliamentary Advisory Board on Sustainable Development. He served as his parliamentary group's spokesperson on development policy.

In addition to his committee assignments, Hoffmann was part of the German-Ukrainian Parliamentary Friendship Group and the German Parliamentary Friendship Group for Relations with the Western African States. He was also a substitute member of the German delegation to the Parliamentary Assembly of the Council of Europe (PACE) from 2018 to 2025, where he served on the Committee on Social Affairs, Health and Sustainable Development. From 2022, he was a member of the German delegation to the Franco-German Parliamentary Assembly.

In July 2024, Hoffmann announced that he would not stand in the 2025 federal elections but instead resign from active politics by the end of the parliamentary term.

== Other activities ==
- German Network against Neglected Tropical Diseases (DNTDs), Member of the Parliamentary Advisory Board (since 2018)
- German Africa Foundation (DAS), Member of the Board (since 2018)
- German Foundation for World Population (DSW), Member of the Parliamentary Advisory Board (since 2018)
- St Barbara Foundation, Member of the Board of Trustees
