= Badenweiler =

Place in Baden-Württemberg, Germany

- Municipality
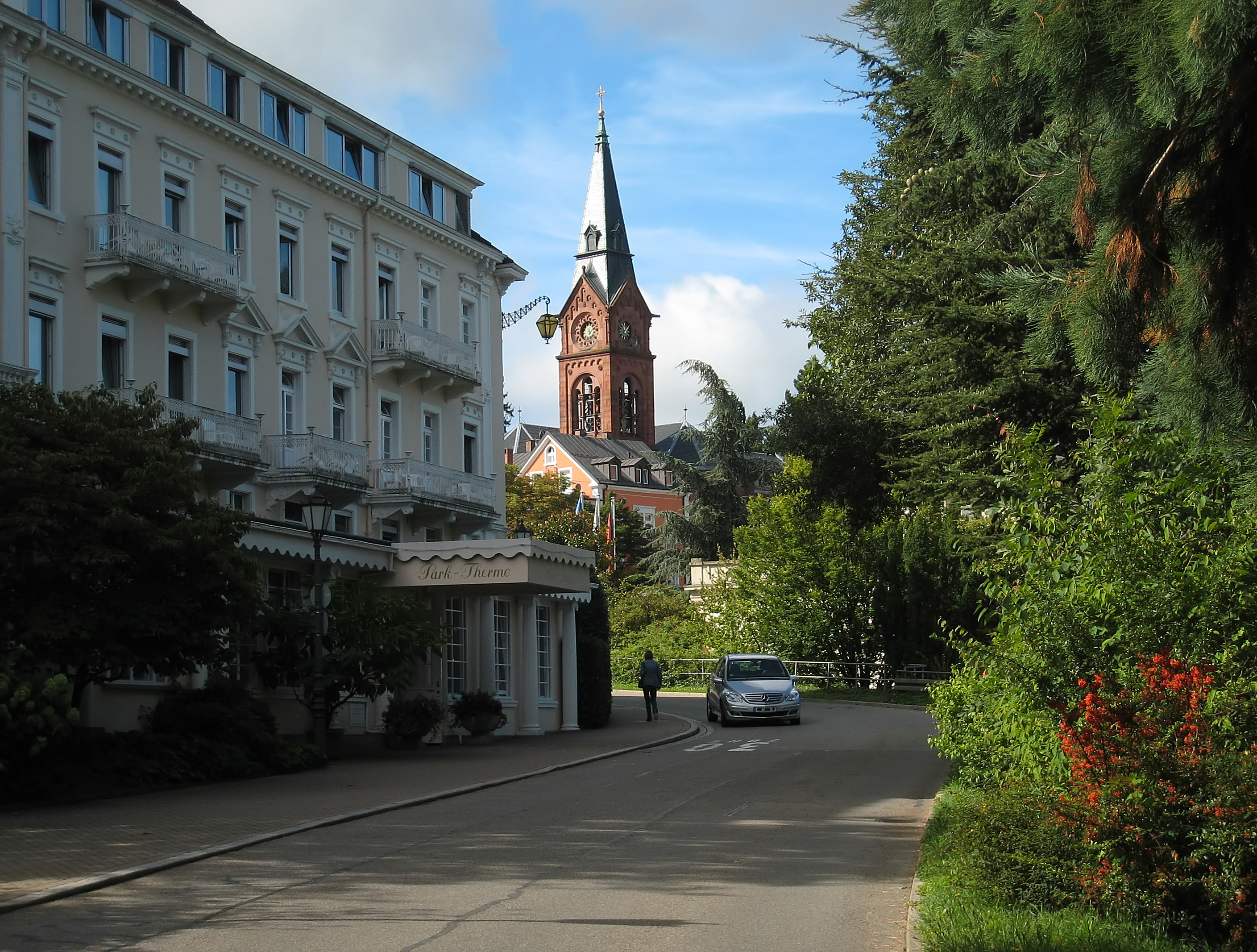

- Coat of arms

- Location of Badenweiler within Breisgau-Hochschwarzwald district
- Interactive map of Badenweiler
- Location within Germany Location within Baden-Württemberg
- Coordinates: 47°48′N 7°40′E
- Country: Germany
- State: Baden-Württemberg
- Admin. region: Freiburg
- District: Breisgau-Hochschwarzwald
- Subdivisions: 3

Government
  - Mayor (2019–27): Vincenz Wissler (FDP)

Area
  - Total: 13.03 km^{2} (5.03 sq mi)
- Elevation: 425 m (1,394 ft)

Population (2025-12-31)
  - Total: 4,688
  - Density: 359.8/km^{2} (931.8/sq mi)
- Time zone: UTC+01:00 (CET)
  - Summer (DST): UTC+02:00 (CEST)
- Postal codes: 79410
- Dialling codes: 07632
- Vehicle registration: FR
- Website: gemeinde-badenweiler.de

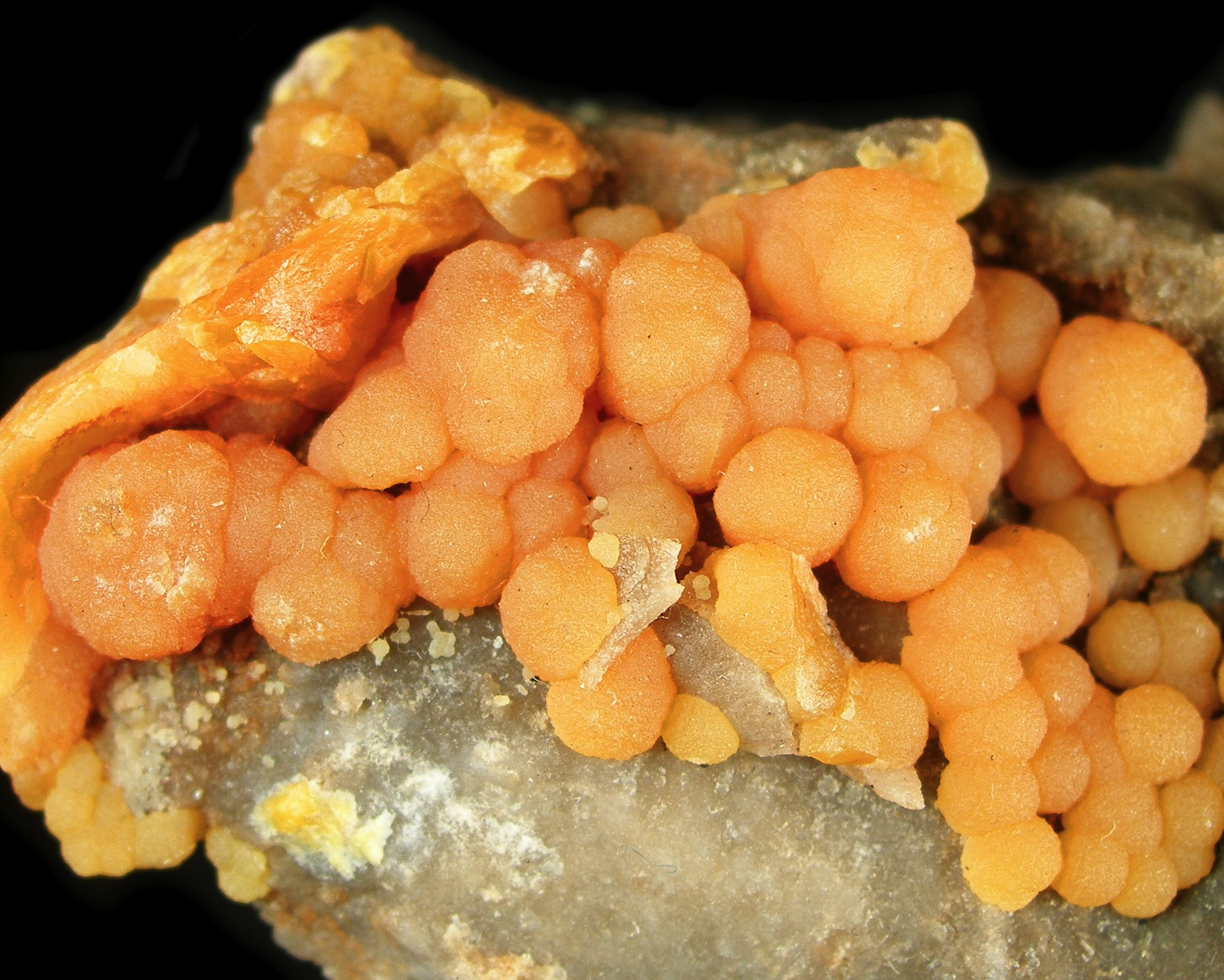
Mimetite specimen from Haus Baden Mine, Badenweiler lead mining district.

Badenweiler (German pronunciation: [ˈbaːdn̩ˌvaɪlɐ]; High Alemannic: Badewiler) is a health resort and spa in the Breisgau-Hochschwarzwald district of Baden-Württemberg, Germany, historically in the Markgräflerland. It is 28 kilometers by road and rail from Basel, 10 kilometers from the French border, and 20 kilometers from Mulhouse. The nearest big city on the German side of the border is Freiburg, about 30 kilometers away. Badenweiler lies at the western edge of the Black Forest. It is sheltered by the Blauen, 1,164 metres (3,819 feet), and the climate is excellent. Its parish (Evangelical) church (1897) was built at the foot of an 11th-century castle which belonged to the margraves of Baden and was destroyed by the French during the wars of Louis XV.

Many visitors come to Badenweiler for the warm mineral springs, with temperatures of 21 °C (70 °F), others for its whey cure, and still others on account of its equable climate and picturesque surroundings. There is a Kurhaus and a park of 15 acres (61,000 m^{2}) containing a historic arboretum (the Staatliche Baderverwaltung Badenweiler), as well as a grand-ducal castle. In 1784, the well-preserved Roman baths were discovered there.

== Main Roman temple and St. Paul's church ==
The site where the present Protestant St. Paul's church is standing is a historic site that was a religious place of worship already in Roman times. The Romans built here in the year AD 145 a large podium temple of which very little remains. The temple stood on a "pile structure". The temple builders drove sharpened oak piles into the loamy soil to secure the ground for this heavy building. The temple was Gallo-Roman with a classic-Italic main front placed on a monumental podium. On the ruins of the Roman temple a Christian church was built in the twelfth century. The church was in a bad state when it was demolished in 1892 and rebuilt as a Neo-Romanesque building between 1893 and 1898. In the course of the digging Roman walls and wall fragments of preceding church buildings were discovered and included in the construction of the new church. In the previous church's tower six 14th-century frescoes were discovered which are now in the choir of the present church. They show a so-called Dance of the Dead where living and dead meet. Three skeletons are bearing the inscription: "We were what you are, what we are you shall be." This is addressed to three living (a child, a middle-aged man and an old man) whose garments are corresponding to the fashion of the rich in the 14th century.

== Personalities ==
The Russian writer Anton Chekhov died there on 15 July (o.s. 2 July) 1904. From Badenweiler, Chekhov wrote outwardly jovial letters to his sister Masha describing the food and surroundings. Badenweiler became one of Chekhov's hometown Taganrog's sister cities in 2002.

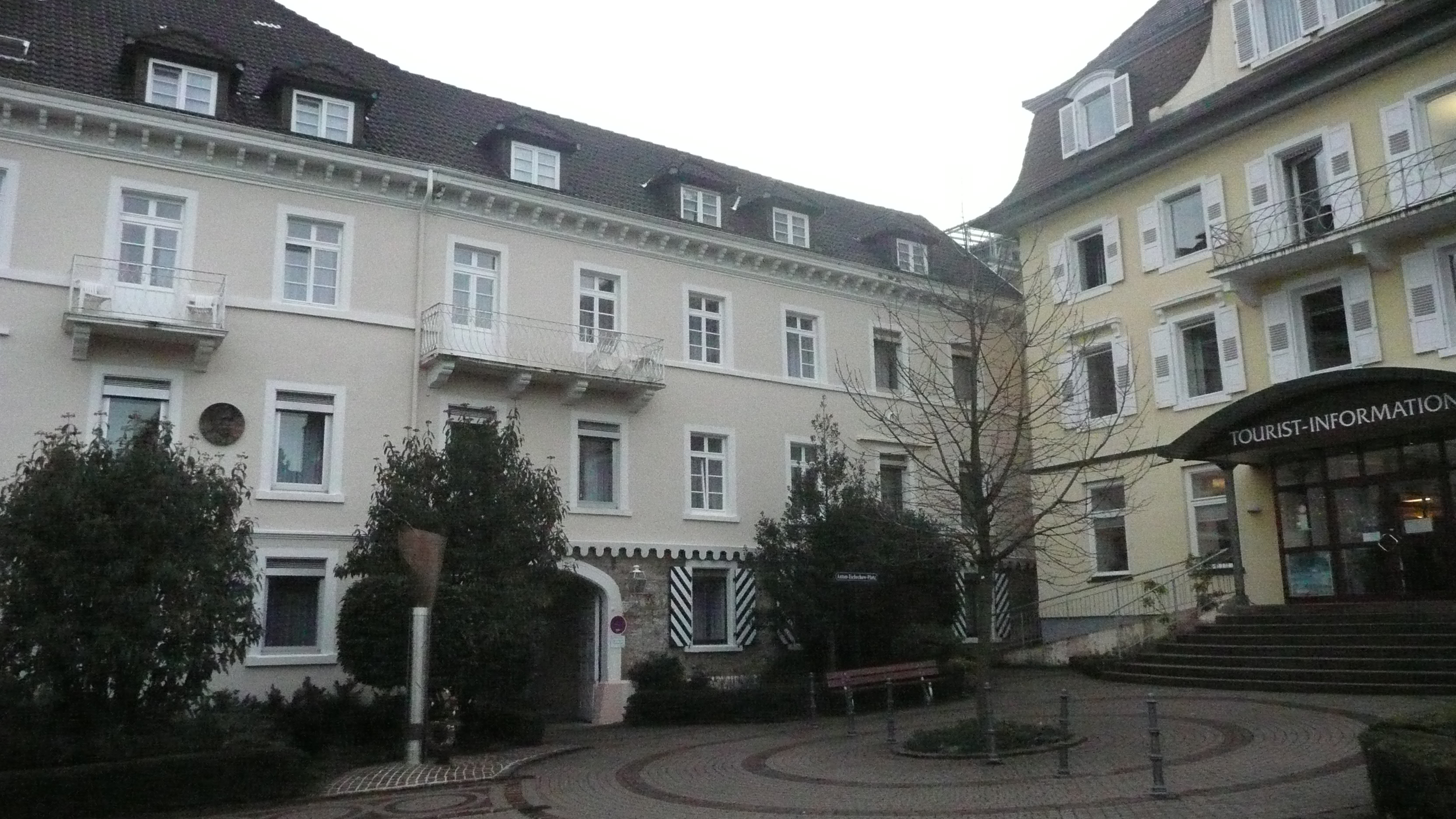
Anton Chekhov Place

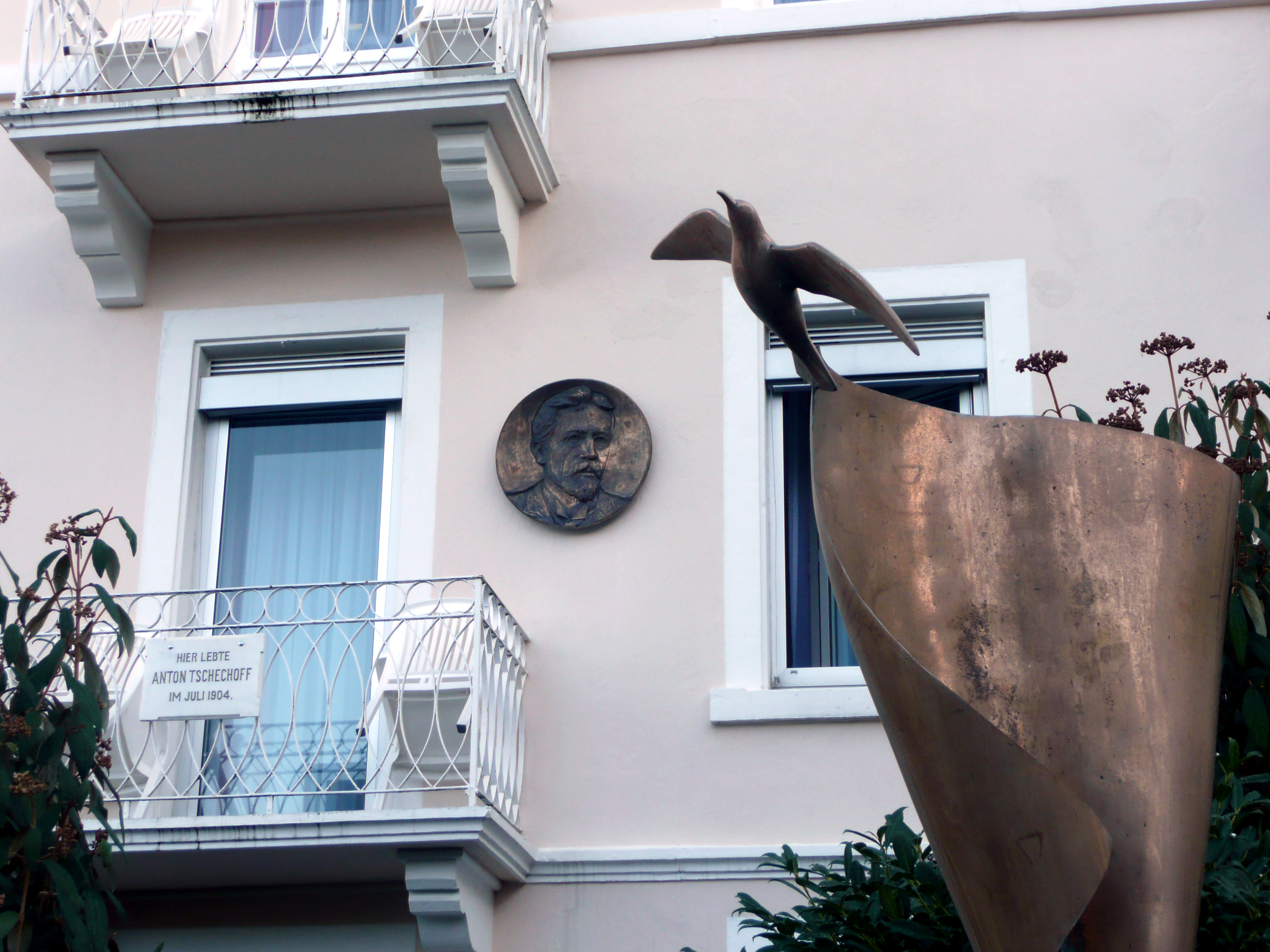
Room where he died and sculpture "The Seagull" by Alexander Taratinov

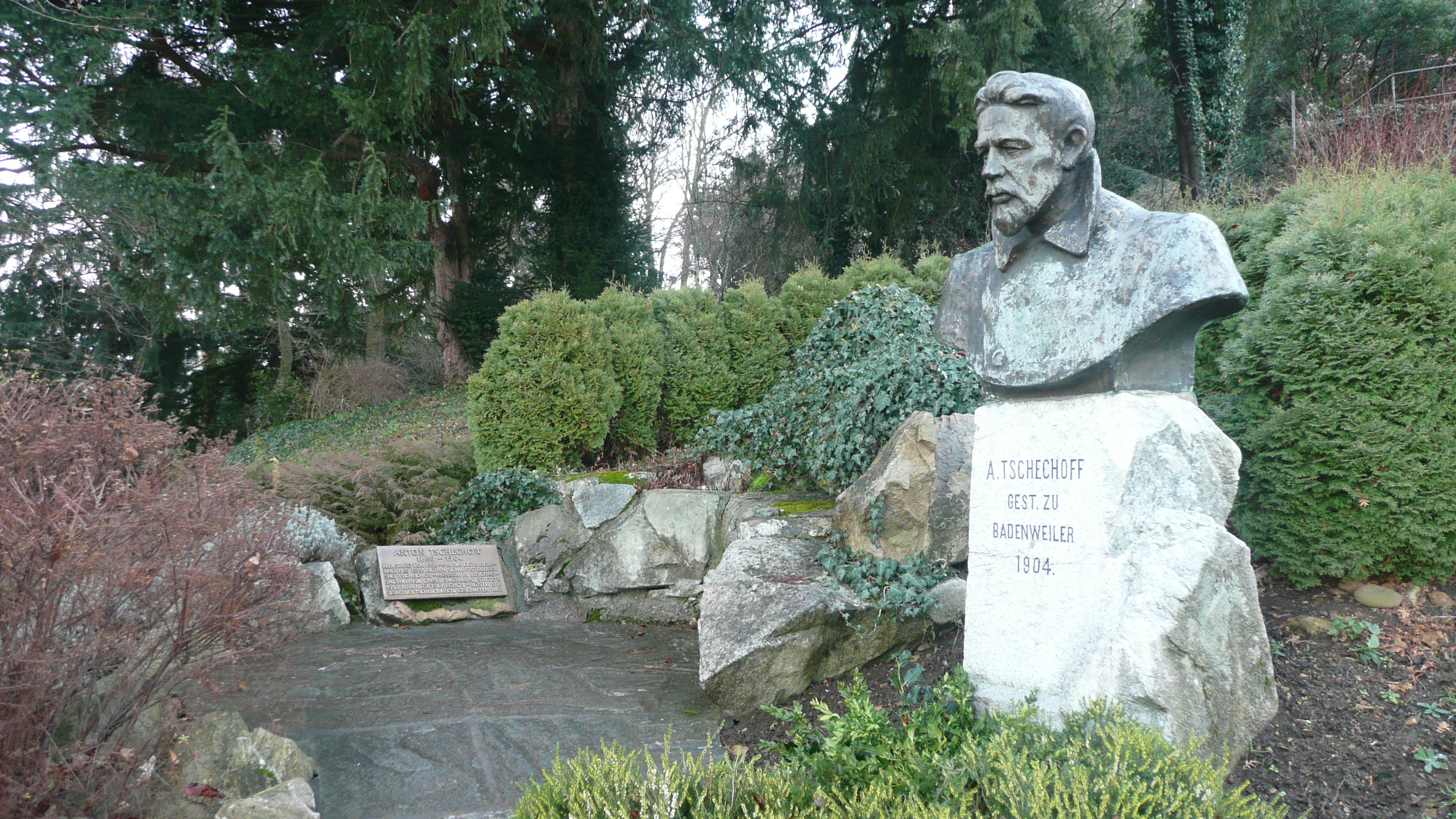
Monument on Castle Mountain

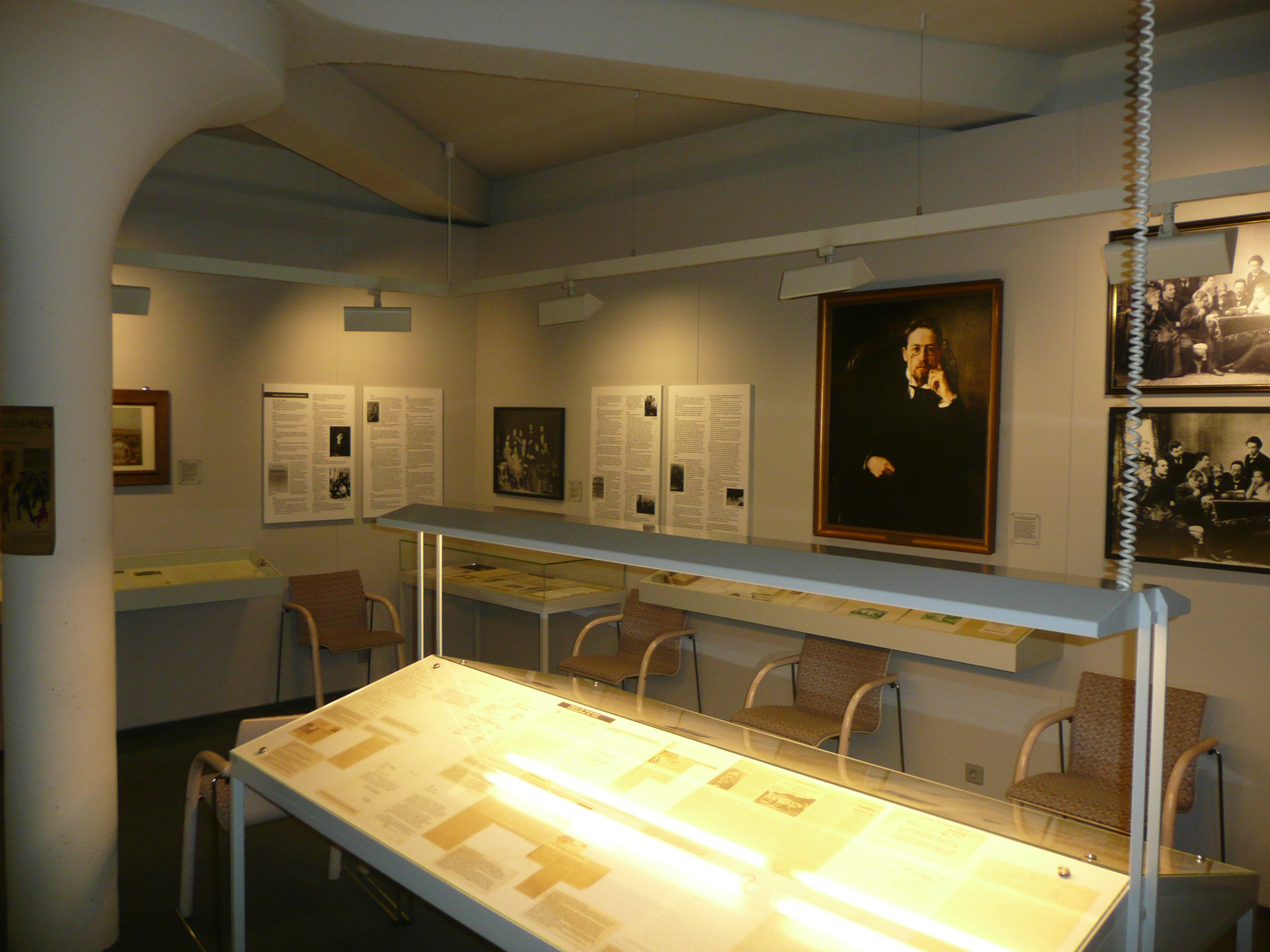
Chekhov Salon

The American poet, novelist, and journalist Stephen Crane died there on 15 June 1900 of tuberculosis.
Ephraim Moses Lilien (1874–1925) was an art nouveau illustrator and print-maker particularly noted for his art on Jewish and Zionist themes. He is sometimes called the "first Zionist artist."

The musicologist Wolfgang Alexander Thomas-San-Galli was born in Badenweiler in 1875.

The wife of the first prime minister of India Jawaharlal Nehru, Kamala Nehru was treated here for tuberculosis. Jawaharlal Nehru spent many days by his wife's side in Badenweiler to attend to her.

The Yiddish poet and memoirist Daniel Charney was treated there for tuberculosis. He claims to have stayed in the same room in Badenweiler that Chekhov died in. He also describes being treated by the same doctor there who had treated both Chekhov and the famous Yiddish writer Sholem Aleichem.
