= List of members of the 15th Bundestag =

15th Bundestag
←	14th	16th	→
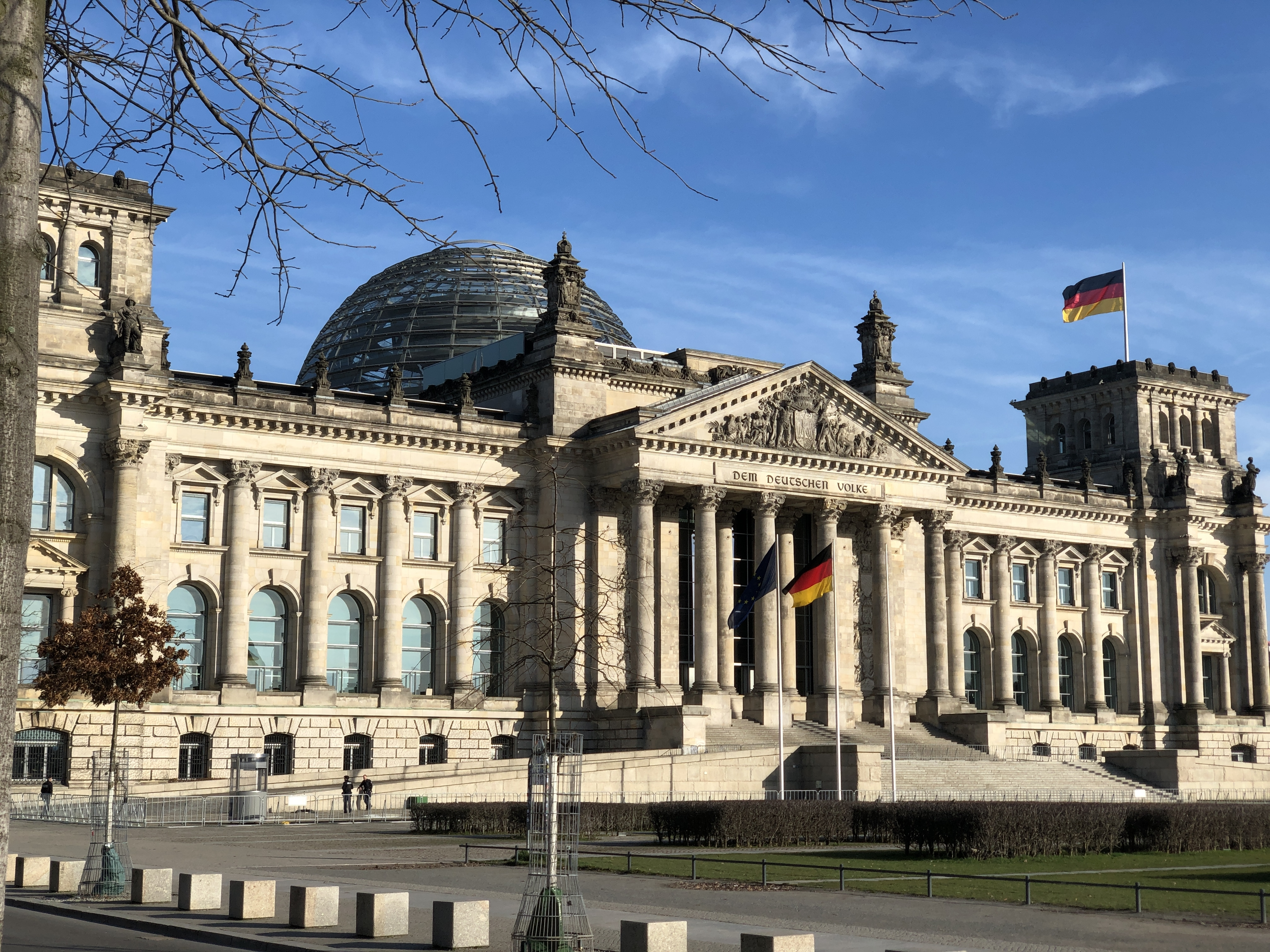
- Reichstag building in 2020

Overview
- Legislative body: Bundestag
- Jurisdiction: Germany
- Meeting place: Reichstag building, Berlin

Bundestag
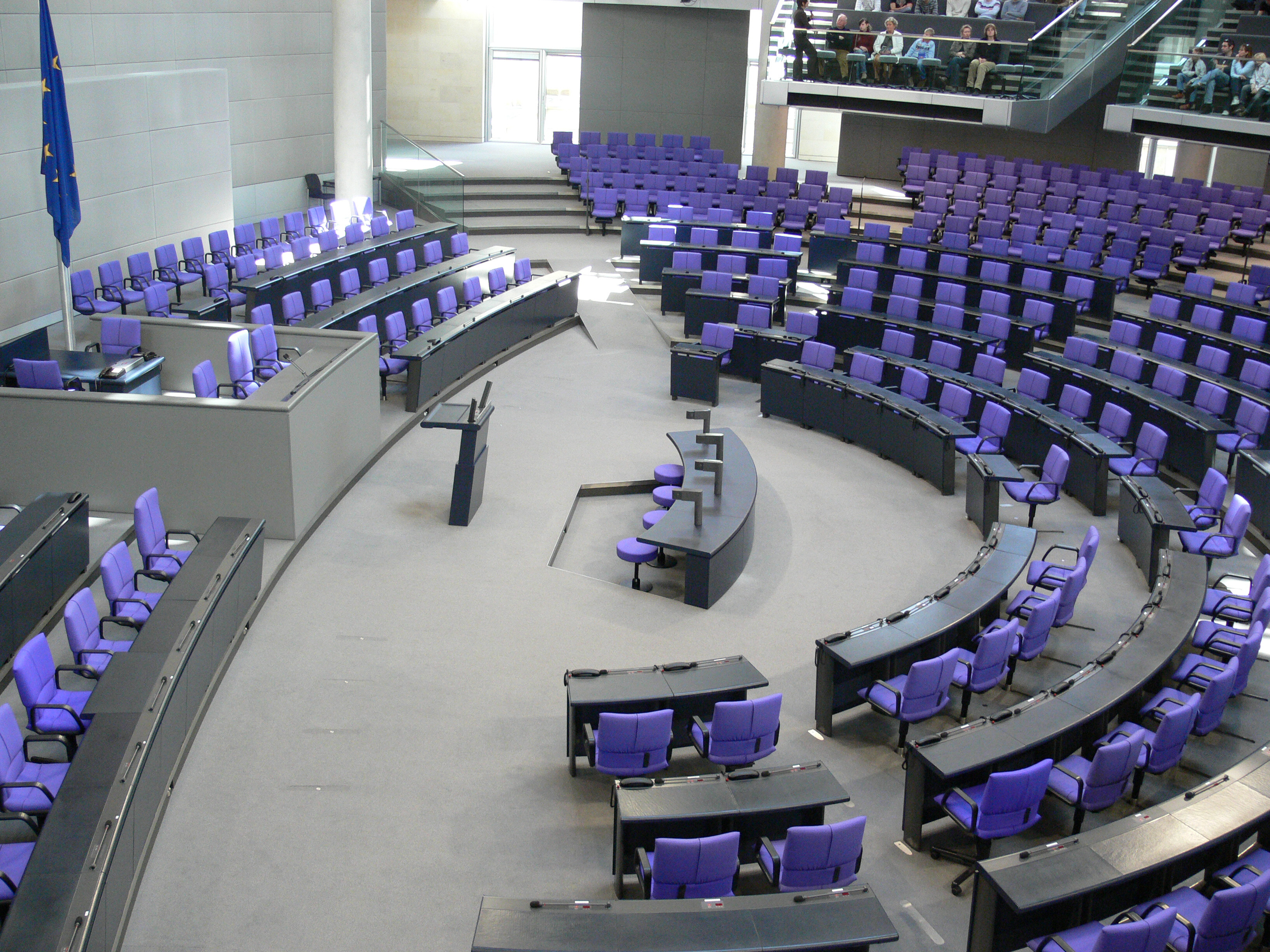
- Members: 601

This is a list of members of the 15th Bundestag – the lower house of parliament of the Federal Republic of Germany, whose members were in office from 17 October 2002 until 17 October 2005.

== Summary ==
This summary includes changes in the numbers of the four caucuses (CDU/CSU, SPD, FDP, Greens):

Time	Reason of change	SPD	CDU/CSU	Greens	FDP	Others	Total number
17 October 2002	First meeting	251	248	55	47	2	603
11 February 2003	Jürgen Möllemann leaves the FDP caucus and becomes unaffiliated	251	248	55	46	3	603
14 June 2003	Michael Kauch becomes a member again as successor of Möllemann	251	248	55	47	2	603
14 November 2003	Martin Hohmann leaves the CDU/CSU caucus and becomes unaffiliated	251	247	55	47	3	603
17 April 2004	Anke Hartnagel dies; her seat is vacated permanently because it is an overhang seat	250	247	55	47	3	602
1 July 2004	Christoph Matschie resigns; his seat is vacated permanently because it is an overhang seat	249	247	55	47	3	601

== Members ==
State	No.	Constituency	Member	Party
Schleswig-Holstein	1	Flensburg – Schleswig	Wolfgang Wodarg	SPD
Schleswig-Holstein	2	Nordfriesland – Dithmarschen-Nord	Peter Harry Carstensen	CDU
Schleswig-Holstein	3	Steinburg – Dithmarschen-Süd	Cornelie Sonntag-Wolgast	SPD
Schleswig-Holstein	4	Rendsburg-Eckernförde	Ulrike Mehl	SPD
Schleswig-Holstein	5	Kiel	Hans-Peter Bartels	SPD
Schleswig-Holstein	6	Plön – Neumünster	Michael Bürsch	SPD
Schleswig-Holstein	7	Pinneberg	Ernst Dieter Rossmann	SPD
Schleswig-Holstein	8	Segeberg – Stormarn-Nord	Franz Thönnes	SPD
Schleswig-Holstein	9	Ostholstein	Bettina Hagedorn	SPD
Schleswig-Holstein	10	Herzogtum Lauenburg – Stormarn-Süd	Thomas Sauer	SPD
Schleswig-Holstein	11	Lübeck	Gabriele Hiller-Ohm	SPD
Schleswig-Holstein	List		Dietrich Austermann (Note: Dietrich Austermann resigned on 5 May 2005.)	CDU
Schleswig-Holstein	List		Otto Bernhardt	CDU
Schleswig-Holstein	List		Wolfgang Börnsen	CDU
Schleswig-Holstein	List		Anke Eymer	CDU
Schleswig-Holstein	List		Ole Schröder	CDU
Schleswig-Holstein	List		Gero Storjohann	CDU
Schleswig-Holstein	List		Angelika Volquartz (Note: Angelika Volquartz resigned on 16 June 2003.)	CDU
Schleswig-Holstein	List		Helmut Lamp (Note: Helmut Lamp took office on 18 June 2003, to succeed Angelika Volquartz.)	CDU
Schleswig-Holstein	List		Carl von Bismarck (Note: Carl von Bismarck took office on 25 April 2005, to succeed Peter Harry Carstensen.)	CDU
Schleswig-Holstein	List		Roland Dieckmann (Note: Roland Dieckmann took office on 6 May 2005, to succeed Dietrich Austermann.)	CDU
Schleswig-Holstein	List		Grietje Staffelt	Greens
Schleswig-Holstein	List		Rainder Steenblock	Greens
Schleswig-Holstein	List		Jürgen Koppelin	FDP
Schleswig-Holstein	List		Wolfgang Kubicki (Note: Wolfgang Kubicki resigned on 9 December 2002.)	FDP
Schleswig-Holstein	List		Christel Happach-Kasan (Note: Christel Happach-Kasan took office on 10 December 2002, to succeed Wolfgang Kubicki.)	FDP
Mecklenburg-Vorpommern	12	Wismar – Nordwestmecklenburg – Parchim	Iris Hoffmann	SPD
Mecklenburg-Vorpommern	13	Schwerin – Ludwigslust	Hans-Joachim Hacker	SPD
Mecklenburg-Vorpommern	14	Rostock	Christine Lucyga	SPD
Mecklenburg-Vorpommern	15	Stralsund – Nordvorpommern – Rügen	Angela Merkel	CDU
Mecklenburg-Vorpommern	16	Greifswald – Demmin – Ostvorpommern	Ulrich Adam	CDU
Mecklenburg-Vorpommern	17	Bad Doberan – Güstrow – Müritz	Dirk Manzewski	SPD
Mecklenburg-Vorpommern	18	Neubrandenburg – Mecklenburg-Strelitz – Uecker-Randow	Götz-Peter Lohmann	SPD
Mecklenburg-Vorpommern	List		Susanne Jaffke	CDU
Mecklenburg-Vorpommern	List		Werner Kuhn	CDU
Mecklenburg-Vorpommern	List		Eberhard Otto	FDP
Hamburg	19	Hamburg-Mitte	Johannes Kahrs	SPD
Hamburg	20	Hamburg-Altona	Olaf Scholz	SPD
Hamburg	21	Hamburg-Eimsbüttel	Angelika Mertens	SPD
Hamburg	22	Hamburg-Nord	Anke Hartnagel (Note: Anke Hartnagel died on 17 April 2004.)	SPD
Hamburg	23	Hamburg-Wandsbek	Ortwin Runde	SPD
Hamburg	24	Hamburg-Bergedorf – Harburg	Hans-Ulrich Klose	SPD
Hamburg	List		Antje Blumenthal	CDU
Hamburg	List		Dirk Fischer	CDU
Hamburg	List		Jürgen Klimke	CDU
Hamburg	List		Volker Rühe	CDU
Hamburg	List		Anja Hajduk	Greens
Hamburg	List		Krista Sager	Greens
Hamburg	List		Rainer Funke	FDP
Lower Saxony	25	Aurich – Emden	Jann-Peter Janssen (Note: Jann-Peter Janssen resigned on 24 January 2005.)	SPD
Lower Saxony	26	Unterems	Gitta Connemann	CDU
Lower Saxony	27	Friesland – Wilhelmshaven	Karin Evers-Meyer	SPD
Lower Saxony	28	Oldenburg – Ammerland	Gesine Multhaupt	SPD
Lower Saxony	29	Delmenhorst – Wesermarsch – Oldenburg-Land	Holger Ortel	SPD
Lower Saxony	30	Cuxhaven – Osterholz	Annette Faße	SPD
Lower Saxony	31	Stade – Cuxhaven	Margrit Wetzel	SPD
Lower Saxony	32	Mittelems	Hermann Kues	CDU
Lower Saxony	33	Cloppenburg – Vechta	Manfred Carstens	CDU
Lower Saxony	34	Diepholz – Nienburg I	Rolf Kramer	SPD
Lower Saxony	35	Rotenburg – Verden	Joachim Stünker	SPD
Lower Saxony	36	Soltau-Fallingbostel – Winsen L.	Monika Griefahn	SPD
Lower Saxony	37	Lüchow-Dannenberg – Lüneburg	Hedi Wegener	SPD
Lower Saxony	38	Osnabrück-Land	Georg Schirmbeck	CDU
Lower Saxony	39	Stadt Osnabrück	Martin Schwanholz	SPD
Lower Saxony	40	Nienburg II – Schaumburg	Sebastian Edathy	SPD
Lower Saxony	41	Stadt Hannover I	Gerd Andres	SPD
Lower Saxony	42	Stadt Hannover II	Edelgard Bulmahn	SPD
Lower Saxony	43	Hannover-Land I	Caren Marks	SPD
Lower Saxony	44	Celle – Uelzen	Peter Struck	SPD
Lower Saxony	45	Gifhorn – Peine	Hubertus Heil	SPD
Lower Saxony	46	Hameln-Pyrmont – Holzminden	Brigitte Schulte	SPD
Lower Saxony	47	Hannover-Land II	Horst Schild	SPD
Lower Saxony	48	Hildesheim	Bernhard Brinkmann	SPD
Lower Saxony	49	Salzgitter – Wolfenbüttel	Wilhelm Schmidt	SPD
Lower Saxony	50	Braunschweig	Carola Reimann	SPD
Lower Saxony	51	Helmstedt – Wolfsburg	Hans-Jürgen Uhl	SPD
Lower Saxony	52	Goslar – Northeim – Osterode	Wilhelm Priesmeier	SPD
Lower Saxony	53	Göttingen	Inge Wettig-Danielmeier	SPD
Lower Saxony	List		Monika Brüning	CDU
Lower Saxony	List		Vera Dominke	CDU
Lower Saxony	List		Hans Georg Faust	CDU
Lower Saxony	List		Enak Ferlemann	CDU
Lower Saxony	List		Hartwig Fischer	CDU
Lower Saxony	List		Maria Flachsbarth	CDU
Lower Saxony	List		Jochen-Konrad Fromme	CDU
Lower Saxony	List		Kurt-Dieter Grill	CDU
Lower Saxony	List		Reinhard Grindel	CDU
Lower Saxony	List		Michael Grosse-Brömer	CDU
Lower Saxony	List		Klaus-Jürgen Hedrich	CDU
Lower Saxony	List		Eckart von Klaeden	CDU
Lower Saxony	List		Thomas Kossendey	CDU
Lower Saxony	List		Martina Krogmann	CDU
Lower Saxony	List		Walter Link	CDU
Lower Saxony	List		Rita Pawelski	CDU
Lower Saxony	List		Friedbert Pflüger	CDU
Lower Saxony	List		Heinrich-Wilhelm Ronsöhr	CDU
Lower Saxony	List		Gabriele Groneberg	SPD
Lower Saxony	List		Monika Heubaum	SPD
Lower Saxony	List		Gabriele Lösekrug-Möller	SPD
Lower Saxony	List		Volker Neumann	SPD
Lower Saxony	List		Reinhold Robbe (Note: Reinhold Robbe resigned on 12 May 2005.)	SPD
Lower Saxony	List		Gerhard Schröder	SPD
Lower Saxony	List		Lars Klingbeil (Note: Lars Klingbeil took office on 25 January 2005, to succeed Jann-Peter Janssen.)	SPD
Lower Saxony	List		Hans Forster (Note: Hans Forster took office on 12 May 2005, to succeed Reinhold Robbe.)	SPD
Lower Saxony	List		Thea Dückert	Greens
Lower Saxony	List		Thilo Hoppe	Greens
Lower Saxony	List		Silke Stokar von Neuforn	Greens
Lower Saxony	List		Jürgen Trittin	Greens
Lower Saxony	List		Marianne Tritz	Greens
Lower Saxony	List		Christian Eberl (Note: Christian Eberl resigned on 20 March 2003.)	FDP
Lower Saxony	List		Hans-Michael Goldmann	FDP
Lower Saxony	List		Ina Lenke	FDP
Lower Saxony	List		Carl-Ludwig Thiele	FDP
Lower Saxony	List		Claudia Winterstein	FDP
Lower Saxony	List		Angelika Brunkhorst (Note: Angelika Brunkhorst took office on 21 March 2003, to succeed Christian Eberl.)	FDP
Bremen	54	Bremen I	Volker Kröning	SPD
Bremen	55	Bremen II – Bremerhaven	Uwe Beckmeyer	SPD
Bremen	List		Bernd Neumann	CDU
Bremen	List		Marieluise Beck	Greens
Brandenburg	56	Prignitz – Ostprignitz-Ruppin – Havelland I	Ernst Bahr	SPD
Brandenburg	57	Uckermark – Barnim I	Markus Meckel	SPD
Brandenburg	58	Oberhavel – Havelland II	Angelika Krüger-Leißner	SPD
Brandenburg	59	Märkisch-Oderland – Barnim II	Petra Bierwirth	SPD
Brandenburg	60	Brandenburg an der Havel – Potsdam-Mittelmark I – Havelland III – Teltow-Fläming I	Margrit Spielmann	SPD
Brandenburg	61	Potsdam – Potsdam-Mittelmark II – Teltow-Fläming II	Andrea Wicklein	SPD
Brandenburg	62	Dahme-Spreewald – Teltow-Fläming III – Oberspreewald-Lausitz I	Peter Danckert	SPD
Brandenburg	63	Frankfurt (Oder) – Oder-Spree	Jörg Vogelsänger	SPD
Brandenburg	64	Cottbus – Spree-Neiße	Wilfried Schreck	SPD
Brandenburg	65	Elbe-Elster – Oberspreewald-Lausitz II	Stephan Hilsberg	SPD
Brandenburg	List		Rainer Eppelmann	CDU
Brandenburg	List		Katherina Reiche	CDU
Brandenburg	List		Michael Stübgen	CDU
Brandenburg	List		Andrea Voßhoff	CDU
Brandenburg	List		Jürgen Türk	FDP
Brandenburg	List		Cornelia Behm	Greens
Saxony-Anhalt	66	Altmark	Reinhard Weis	SPD
Saxony-Anhalt	67	Elbe-Havel-Gebiet	Waltraud Wolff	SPD
Saxony-Anhalt	68	Harz	Tobias Marhold	SPD
Saxony-Anhalt	69	Magdeburg	Uwe Küster	SPD
Saxony-Anhalt	70	Börde	Ulrich Kasparick	SPD
Saxony-Anhalt	71	Anhalt	Engelbert Wistuba	SPD
Saxony-Anhalt	72	Bernburg – Bitterfeld – Saalkreis	Klaas Hübner	SPD
Saxony-Anhalt	73	Halle	Christel Riemann-Hanewinckel	SPD
Saxony-Anhalt	74	Burgenland	Eckhart Lewering	SPD
Saxony-Anhalt	75	Mansfelder Land	Silvia Schmidt	SPD
Saxony-Anhalt	List		Christoph Bergner	CDU
Saxony-Anhalt	List		Hartmut Büttner	CDU
Saxony-Anhalt	List		Uda Heller	CDU
Saxony-Anhalt	List		Bernd Heynemann	CDU
Saxony-Anhalt	List		Peter Letzgus	CDU
Saxony-Anhalt	List		Ulrich Petzold	CDU
Saxony-Anhalt	List		Cornelia Pieper	FDP
Saxony-Anhalt	List		Undine Kurth	Greens
Berlin	76	Berlin-Mitte	Jörg-Otto Spiller	SPD
Berlin	77	Berlin-Pankow	Wolfgang Thierse	SPD
Berlin	78	Berlin-Reinickendorf	Detlef Dzembritzki	SPD
Berlin	79	Berlin-Spandau – Charlottenburg North	Swen Schulz	SPD
Berlin	80	Berlin-Steglitz-Zehlendorf	Klaus Uwe Benneter	SPD
Berlin	81	Berlin-Charlottenburg-Wilmersdorf	Petra Merkel	SPD
Berlin	82	Berlin-Tempelhof-Schöneberg	Eckhardt Barthel	SPD
Berlin	83	Berlin-Neukölln	Ditmar Staffelt	SPD
Berlin	84	Berlin-Friedrichshain-Kreuzberg – Prenzlauer Berg East	Hans-Christian Ströbele	Greens
Berlin	85	Berlin-Treptow – Köpenick	Siegfried Scheffler	SPD
Berlin	86	Berlin-Marzahn – Hellersdorf	Petra Pau	PDS
Berlin	87	Berlin-Lichtenberg	Gesine Lötzsch	PDS
Berlin	List		Verena Butalikakis	CDU
Berlin	List		Roland Gewalt	CDU
Berlin	List		Siegfried Helias	CDU
Berlin	List		Günter Nooke	CDU
Berlin	List		Peter Rzepka	CDU
Berlin	List		Edeltraut Töpfer	CDU
Berlin	List		Franziska Eichstädt-Bohlig	Greens
Berlin	List		Renate Künast	Greens
Berlin	List		Werner Schulz	Greens
Berlin	List		Markus Löning	FDP
Berlin	List		Günter Rexrodt (Note: Günter Rexrodt died on 19 August 2004.)	FDP
Berlin	List		Hellmut Königshaus (Note: Hellmut Königshaus took office on 20 August 2004, to succeed Günter Rexrodt.)	FDP
North Rhine-Westphalia	88	Aachen	Ulla Schmidt	SPD
North Rhine-Westphalia	89	Kreis Aachen	Achim Großmann	SPD
North Rhine-Westphalia	90	Heinsberg	Leo Dautzenberg	CDU
North Rhine-Westphalia	91	Düren	Dietmar Nietan	SPD
North Rhine-Westphalia	92	Erftkreis I	Gabriele Frechen	SPD
North Rhine-Westphalia	93	Euskirchen – Erftkreis II	Wolf Bauer	CDU
North Rhine-Westphalia	94	Cologne I	Martin Dörmann	SPD
North Rhine-Westphalia	95	Cologne II	Lale Akgün	SPD
North Rhine-Westphalia	96	Cologne III	Rolf Mützenich	SPD
North Rhine-Westphalia	97	Bonn	Ulrich Kelber	SPD
North Rhine-Westphalia	98	Rhein-Sieg-Kreis I	Uwe Göllner	SPD
North Rhine-Westphalia	99	Rhein-Sieg-Kreis II	Norbert Röttgen	CDU
North Rhine-Westphalia	100	Oberbergischer Kreis	Klaus-Peter Flosbach	CDU
North Rhine-Westphalia	101	Rheinisch-Bergischer Kreis	Wolfgang Bosbach	CDU
North Rhine-Westphalia	102	Leverkusen – Cologne IV	Ernst Küchler (Note: Ernst Küchler resigned on 15 October 2004.)	SPD
North Rhine-Westphalia	103	Wuppertal I	Manfred Zöllmer	SPD
North Rhine-Westphalia	104	Solingen – Remscheid – Wuppertal II	Hans-Werner Bertl	SPD
North Rhine-Westphalia	105	Mettmann I	Lilo Friedrich	SPD
North Rhine-Westphalia	106	Mettmann II	Kerstin Griese	SPD
North Rhine-Westphalia	107	Düsseldorf I	Michael Müller	SPD
North Rhine-Westphalia	108	Düsseldorf II	Karin Kortmann	SPD
North Rhine-Westphalia	109	Neuss I	Kurt Bodewig	SPD
North Rhine-Westphalia	110	Mönchengladbach	Günter Krings	CDU
North Rhine-Westphalia	111	Krefeld I – Neuss II	Willy Wimmer	CDU
North Rhine-Westphalia	112	Viersen	Uwe Schummer	CDU
North Rhine-Westphalia	113	Kleve	Ronald Pofalla	CDU
North Rhine-Westphalia	114	Wesel I	Hans-Ulrich Krüger	SPD
North Rhine-Westphalia	115	Krefeld II – Wesel II	Siegmund Ehrmann	SPD
North Rhine-Westphalia	116	Duisburg I	Petra Weis	SPD
North Rhine-Westphalia	117	Duisburg II	Johannes Pflug	SPD
North Rhine-Westphalia	118	Oberhausen – Wesel III	Wolfgang Grotthaus	SPD
North Rhine-Westphalia	119	Mülheim – Essen I	Anton Schaaf	SPD
North Rhine-Westphalia	120	Essen II	Rolf Hempelmann	SPD
North Rhine-Westphalia	121	Essen III	Hans-Günter Bruckmann	SPD
North Rhine-Westphalia	122	Recklinghausen I	Jochen Welt (Note: Jochen Welt resigned on 22 October 2004.)	SPD
North Rhine-Westphalia	123	Recklinghausen II	Waltraud Lehn	SPD
North Rhine-Westphalia	124	Gelsenkirchen	Joachim Poß	SPD
North Rhine-Westphalia	125	Steinfurt I – Borken I	Jens Spahn	CDU
North Rhine-Westphalia	126	Bottrop – Recklinghausen III	Dieter Grasedieck	SPD
North Rhine-Westphalia	127	Borken II	Elke Wülfing	CDU
North Rhine-Westphalia	128	Coesfeld – Steinfurt II	Werner Lensing	CDU
North Rhine-Westphalia	129	Steinfurt III	Reinhold Hemker	SPD
North Rhine-Westphalia	130	Münster	Christoph Strässer	SPD
North Rhine-Westphalia	131	Warendorf	Peter Paziorek	CDU
North Rhine-Westphalia	132	Gütersloh	Hubert Deittert	CDU
North Rhine-Westphalia	133	Bielefeld	Rainer Wend	SPD
North Rhine-Westphalia	134	Herford – Minden-Lübbecke II	Wolfgang Spanier	SPD
North Rhine-Westphalia	135	Minden-Lübbecke I	Lothar Ibrügger	SPD
North Rhine-Westphalia	136	Lippe I	Karl Hermann Haack	SPD
North Rhine-Westphalia	137	Höxter – Lippe II	Jürgen Herrmann	CDU
North Rhine-Westphalia	138	Paderborn	Gerhard Wächter	CDU
North Rhine-Westphalia	139	Hagen – Ennepe-Ruhr-Kreis I	René Röspel	SPD
North Rhine-Westphalia	140	Ennepe-Ruhr-Kreis II	Christel Humme	SPD
North Rhine-Westphalia	141	Bochum I	Axel Schäfer	SPD
North Rhine-Westphalia	142	Herne – Bochum II	Gerd Bollmann	SPD
North Rhine-Westphalia	143	Dortmund I	Marco Bülow	SPD
North Rhine-Westphalia	144	Dortmund II	Ulla Burchardt	SPD
North Rhine-Westphalia	145	Unna I	Rolf Stöckel	SPD
North Rhine-Westphalia	146	Hamm – Unna II	Dieter Wiefelspütz	SPD
North Rhine-Westphalia	147	Soest	Bernhard Schulte-Drüggelte	CDU
North Rhine-Westphalia	148	Hochsauerlandkreis	Friedrich Merz	CDU
North Rhine-Westphalia	149	Siegen-Wittgenstein	Willi Brase	SPD
North Rhine-Westphalia	150	Olpe – Märkischer Kreis I	Hartmut Schauerte	CDU
North Rhine-Westphalia	151	Märkischer Kreis II	Dagmar Freitag	SPD
North Rhine-Westphalia	List		Rolf Bietmann	CDU
North Rhine-Westphalia	List		Jochen Borchert	CDU
North Rhine-Westphalia	List		Ralf Brauksiepe	CDU
North Rhine-Westphalia	List		Paul Breuer (Note: Paul Breuer resigned on 27 June 2003.)	CDU
North Rhine-Westphalia	List		Cajus Julius Caesar	CDU
North Rhine-Westphalia	List		Marie-Luise Dött	CDU
North Rhine-Westphalia	List		Ilse Falk	CDU
North Rhine-Westphalia	List		Ingrid Fischbach	CDU
North Rhine-Westphalia	List		Erich G. Fritz	CDU
North Rhine-Westphalia	List		Reinhard Göhner	CDU
North Rhine-Westphalia	List		Hermann Gröhe	CDU
North Rhine-Westphalia	List		Ursula Heinen-Esser	CDU
North Rhine-Westphalia	List		Peter Hintze	CDU
North Rhine-Westphalia	List		Hubert Hüppe	CDU
North Rhine-Westphalia	List		Steffen Kampeter	CDU
North Rhine-Westphalia	List		Irmgard Karwatzki	CDU
North Rhine-Westphalia	List		Norbert Königshofen	CDU
North Rhine-Westphalia	List		Norbert Lammert	CDU
North Rhine-Westphalia	List		Karl-Josef Laumann (Note: Karl-Josef Laumann resigned on 28 June 2005.)	CDU
North Rhine-Westphalia	List		Ursula Lietz	CDU
North Rhine-Westphalia	List		Erwin Marschewski	CDU
North Rhine-Westphalia	List		Wolfgang Meckelburg	CDU
North Rhine-Westphalia	List		Laurenz Meyer	CDU
North Rhine-Westphalia	List		Hildegard Müller	CDU
North Rhine-Westphalia	List		Michaela Noll	CDU
North Rhine-Westphalia	List		Beatrix Philipp	CDU
North Rhine-Westphalia	List		Ruprecht Polenz	CDU
North Rhine-Westphalia	List		Thomas Rachel	CDU
North Rhine-Westphalia	List		Andreas Schmidt	CDU
North Rhine-Westphalia	List		Willi Zylajew	CDU
North Rhine-Westphalia	List		Lena Strothmann (Note: Lena Strothmann took office on 3 July 2003, to succeed Paul Breuer.)	CDU
North Rhine-Westphalia	List		Helmut Brandt (Note: Helmut Brandt took office on 28 June 2005, to succeed Karl-Josef Laumann.)	CDU
North Rhine-Westphalia	List		Ingrid Arndt-Brauer	SPD
North Rhine-Westphalia	List		Ute Berg	SPD
North Rhine-Westphalia	List		Klaus Brandner	SPD
North Rhine-Westphalia	List		Barbara Hendricks	SPD
North Rhine-Westphalia	List		Eike Hovermann	SPD
North Rhine-Westphalia	List		Hans-Peter Kemper	SPD
North Rhine-Westphalia	List		Helga Kühn-Mengel	SPD
North Rhine-Westphalia	List		Ulrike Merten	SPD
North Rhine-Westphalia	List		Franz Müntefering	SPD
North Rhine-Westphalia	List		Bernd Scheelen	SPD
North Rhine-Westphalia	List		Dagmar Schmidt	SPD
North Rhine-Westphalia	List		Walter Schöler	SPD
North Rhine-Westphalia	List		Reinhard Schultz	SPD
North Rhine-Westphalia	List		Angelica Schwall-Düren	SPD
North Rhine-Westphalia	List		Christoph Zöpel	SPD
North Rhine-Westphalia	List		Martina Eickhoff (Note: Martina Eickhoff took office on 18 October 2004, to succeed Ernst Küchler.)	SPD
North Rhine-Westphalia	List		Hildegard Wester (Note: Hildegard Wester took office on 25 October 2004, to succeed Jochen Welt.)	SPD
North Rhine-Westphalia	List		Daniel Bahr	FDP
North Rhine-Westphalia	List		Helga Daub	FDP
North Rhine-Westphalia	List		Jörg van Essen	FDP
North Rhine-Westphalia	List		Ulrike Flach	FDP
North Rhine-Westphalia	List		Otto Fricke	FDP
North Rhine-Westphalia	List		Werner Hoyer	FDP
North Rhine-Westphalia	List		Gudrun Kopp	FDP
North Rhine-Westphalia	List		Jürgen Möllemann (Note: Jürgen Möllemann died on 5 June 2003.)	FDP
North Rhine-Westphalia	List		Günther Friedrich Nolting	FDP
North Rhine-Westphalia	List		Detlef Parr	FDP
North Rhine-Westphalia	List		Andreas Pinkwart (Note: Andreas Pinkwart resigned on 28 June 2005.)	FDP
North Rhine-Westphalia	List		Guido Westerwelle	FDP
North Rhine-Westphalia	List		Ingo Wolf (Note: Ingo Wolf resigned on 8 November 2002.)	FDP
North Rhine-Westphalia	List		Gisela Piltz (Note: Gisela Piltz took office on 11 November 2002, to succeed Ingo Wolf.)	FDP
North Rhine-Westphalia	List		Michael Kauch (Note: Michael Kauch took office on 14 June 2003, to succeed Jürgen Möllemann.)	FDP
North Rhine-Westphalia	List		Michael Terwiesche (Note: Michael Terwiesche took office on 28 June 2005, to succeed Andreas Pinkwart.)	FDP
North Rhine-Westphalia	List		Volker Beck	Greens
North Rhine-Westphalia	List		Jutta Dümpe-Krüger	Greens
North Rhine-Westphalia	List		Michaele Hustedt	Greens
North Rhine-Westphalia	List		Markus Kurth	Greens
North Rhine-Westphalia	List		Reinhard Loske	Greens
North Rhine-Westphalia	List		Kerstin Müller	Greens
North Rhine-Westphalia	List		Winfried Nachtwei	Greens
North Rhine-Westphalia	List		Christa Nickels	Greens
North Rhine-Westphalia	List		Friedrich Ostendorff	Greens
North Rhine-Westphalia	List		Simone Probst	Greens
North Rhine-Westphalia	List		Irmingard Schewe-Gerigk	Greens
North Rhine-Westphalia	List		Ludger Volmer	Greens
Saxony	152	Delitzsch – Torgau-Oschatz – Riesa	Manfred Kolbe	CDU
Saxony	153	Leipzig I	Rainer Fornahl	SPD
Saxony	154	Leipzig II	Gunter Weißgerber	SPD
Saxony	155	Leipziger Land – Muldentalkreis	Jürgen Wieczorek	SPD
Saxony	156	Kamenz – Hoyerswerda – Großenhain	Henry Nitzsche	CDU
Saxony	157	Löbau-Zittau – Görlitz – Niesky	Michael Kretschmer	CDU
Saxony	158	Bautzen – Weißwasser	Maria Michalk	CDU
Saxony	159	Sächsische Schweiz – Weißeritzkreis	Klaus Brähmig	CDU
Saxony	160	Dresden I	Christa Reichard	CDU
Saxony	161	Dresden II – Meißen I	Arnold Vaatz	CDU
Saxony	162	Freiberg – Mittlerer Erzgebirgskreis	Veronika Bellmann	CDU
Saxony	163	Döbeln – Mittweida – Meißen II	Peter Jahr	CDU
Saxony	164	Chemnitz	Jelena Hoffmann	SPD
Saxony	165	Chemnitzer Land – Stollberg	Marco Wanderwitz	CDU
Saxony	166	Annaberg – Aue-Schwarzenberg	Günter Baumann	CDU
Saxony	167	Zwickauer Land – Zwickau	Michael Luther	CDU
Saxony	168	Vogtland – Plauen	Robert Hochbaum	CDU
Saxony	List		Renate Jäger	SPD
Saxony	List		Christian Müller	SPD
Saxony	List		Rolf Schwanitz	SPD
Saxony	List		Gerald Thalheim	SPD
Saxony	List		Simone Violka	SPD
Saxony	List		Marlies Volkmer	SPD
Saxony	List		Andreas Weigel	SPD
Saxony	List		Barbara Wittig	SPD
Saxony	List		Joachim Günther	FDP
Saxony	List		Klaus Haupt	FDP
Saxony	List		Antje Hermenau (Note: Antje Hermenau resigned on 19 December 2004.)	Greens
Saxony	List		Peter Hettlich	Greens
Saxony	List		Monika Lazar (Note: Monika Lazar took office on 21 December 2004, to succeed Antje Hermenau.)	Greens
Hesse	169	Waldeck	Alfred Hartenbach	SPD
Hesse	170	Kassel	Gerhard Rübenkönig	SPD
Hesse	171	Werra-Meißner – Hersfeld	Michael Roth	SPD
Hesse	172	Schwalm-Eder	Gerd Höfer	SPD
Hesse	173	Marburg	Sören Bartol	SPD
Hesse	174	Lahn-Dill	Erika Lotz	SPD
Hesse	175	Gießen	Rüdiger Veit	SPD
Hesse	176	Fulda	Martin Hohmann	CDU
Hesse	177	Hochtaunus	Holger Haibach	CDU
Hesse	178	Wetterau	Nina Hauer	SPD
Hesse	179	Rheingau-Taunus – Limburg	Klaus-Peter Willsch	CDU
Hesse	180	Wiesbaden	Heidemarie Wieczorek-Zeul	SPD
Hesse	181	Hanau	Sascha Raabe	SPD
Hesse	182	Main-Taunus	Heinz Riesenhuber	CDU
Hesse	183	Frankfurt am Main I	Gudrun Schaich-Walch	SPD
Hesse	184	Frankfurt am Main II	Rita Streb-Hesse	SPD
Hesse	185	Groß-Gerau	Gerold Reichenbach	SPD
Hesse	186	Offenbach	Uta Zapf	SPD
Hesse	187	Darmstadt	Walter Hoffmann (Note: Walter Hoffmann resigned on 25 June 2005.)	SPD
Hesse	188	Odenwald	Erika Ober	SPD
Hesse	189	Bergstraße	Christine Lambrecht	SPD
Hesse	List		Helge Braun	CDU
Hesse	List		Jürgen Gehb	CDU
Hesse	List		Helmut Heiderich	CDU
Hesse	List		Kristina Schröder	CDU
Hesse	List		Klaus Lippold	CDU
Hesse	List		Patricia Lips	CDU
Hesse	List		Michael Meister	CDU
Hesse	List		Klaus Minkel	CDU
Hesse	List		Sibylle Pfeiffer	CDU
Hesse	List		Bernd Siebert	CDU
Hesse	List		Erika Steinbach	CDU
Hesse	List		Andreas Storm	CDU
Hesse	List		Gerald Weiß	CDU
Hesse	List		Matthias Berninger	Greens
Hesse	List		Joschka Fischer	Greens
Hesse	List		Anna Lührmann	Greens
Hesse	List		Antje Vollmer	Greens
Hesse	List		Margareta Wolf	Greens
Hesse	List		Wolfgang Gerhardt	FDP
Hesse	List		Heinrich Kolb	FDP
Hesse	List		Hans-Joachim Otto	FDP
Hesse	List		Hermann Otto Solms	FDP
Hesse	List		Hans Eichel	SPD
Hesse	List		Barbara Imhof (Note: Barbara Imhof took office on 5 July 2005, to succeed Walter Hoffmann.)	SPD
Thuringia	190	Eichsfeld – Nordhausen	Manfred Grund	CDU
Thuringia	191	Eisenach – Wartburgkreis – Unstrut-Hainich-Kreis I	Ernst Kranz	SPD
Thuringia	192	Kyffhäuserkreis – Sömmerda – Unstrut-Hainich-Kreis II	Gisela Hilbrecht	SPD
Thuringia	193	Gotha – Ilm-Kreis	Petra Heß	SPD
Thuringia	194	Erfurt	Carsten Schneider	SPD
Thuringia	195	Jena – Weimar – Weimarer Land	Christoph Matschie (Note: Christoph Matschie resigned on 1 July 2004.)	SPD
Thuringia	196	Gera – Saale-Holzland-Kreis	Karsten Schönfeld	SPD
Thuringia	197	Greiz – Altenburger Land	Klaus-Werner Jonas	SPD
Thuringia	198	Sonneberg – Saalfeld-Rudolstadt – Saale-Orla-Kreis	Christine Lehder	SPD
Thuringia	199	Suhl – Schmalkalden-Meiningen – Hildburghausen	Iris Gleicke	SPD
Thuringia	List		Vera Lengsfeld	CDU
Thuringia	List		Bernward Müller	CDU
Thuringia	List		Claudia Nolte	CDU
Thuringia	List		Antje Tillmann	CDU
Thuringia	List		Volkmar Vogel	CDU
Thuringia	List		Karlheinz Guttmacher	FDP
Thuringia	List		Katrin Göring-Eckardt	Greens
Rhineland-Palatinate	200	Neuwied	Sabine Bätzing-Lichtenthäler	SPD
Rhineland-Palatinate	201	Ahrweiler	Wilhelm Josef Sebastian	CDU
Rhineland-Palatinate	202	Koblenz	Michael Fuchs	CDU
Rhineland-Palatinate	203	Mosel/Rhein-Hunsrück	Peter Bleser	CDU
Rhineland-Palatinate	204	Kreuznach	Fritz Rudolf Körper	SPD
Rhineland-Palatinate	205	Bitburg	Peter Rauen	CDU
Rhineland-Palatinate	206	Trier	Karl Diller	SPD
Rhineland-Palatinate	207	Montabaur	Joachim Hörster	CDU
Rhineland-Palatinate	208	Mainz	Michael Hartmann	SPD
Rhineland-Palatinate	209	Worms	Klaus Hagemann	SPD
Rhineland-Palatinate	210	Ludwigshafen/Frankenthal	Doris Barnett	SPD
Rhineland-Palatinate	211	Neustadt – Speyer	Norbert Schindler	CDU
Rhineland-Palatinate	212	Kaiserslautern	Gustav Herzog	SPD
Rhineland-Palatinate	213	Pirmasens	Anita Schäfer	CDU
Rhineland-Palatinate	214	Südpfalz	Ralf Göbel	CDU
Rhineland-Palatinate	List		Elke Leonhard	SPD
Rhineland-Palatinate	List		Ursula Mogg	SPD
Rhineland-Palatinate	List		Rudolf Scharping	SPD
Rhineland-Palatinate	List		Heinz Schmitt	SPD
Rhineland-Palatinate	List		Lydia Westrich	SPD
Rhineland-Palatinate	List		Maria Böhmer	CDU
Rhineland-Palatinate	List		Ute Granold	CDU
Rhineland-Palatinate	List		Bernhard Kaster	CDU
Rhineland-Palatinate	List		Julia Klöckner	CDU
Rhineland-Palatinate	List		Werner Wittlich	CDU
Rhineland-Palatinate	List		Rainer Brüderle	FDP
Rhineland-Palatinate	List		Marita Sehn (Note: Marita Sehn died on 18 January 2004.)	FDP
Rhineland-Palatinate	List		Dieter Thomae	FDP
Rhineland-Palatinate	List		Volker Wissing (Note: Volker Wissing took office on 23 January 2004, to succeed Marita Sehn.)	FDP
Rhineland-Palatinate	List		Ulrike Höfken	Greens
Rhineland-Palatinate	List		Josef Winkler	Greens
Bavaria	215	Altötting	Stephan Mayer	CSU
Bavaria	216	Freising	Franz Obermeier	CSU
Bavaria	217	Fürstenfeldbruck	Gerda Hasselfeldt	CSU
Bavaria	218	Ingolstadt	Horst Seehofer	CSU
Bavaria	219	Munich North	Axel Berg	SPD
Bavaria	220	Munich East	Herbert Frankenhauser	CSU
Bavaria	221	Munich South	Peter Gauweiler	CSU
Bavaria	222	Munich West/Centre	Hans-Peter Uhl	CSU
Bavaria	223	Munich Land	Martin Mayer	CSU
Bavaria	224	Rosenheim	Wolfgang Zeitlmann	CSU
Bavaria	225	Starnberg	Ilse Aigner	CSU
Bavaria	226	Traunstein	Peter Ramsauer	CSU
Bavaria	227	Weilheim	Alexander Dobrindt	CSU
Bavaria	228	Deggendorf	Bartholomäus Kalb	CSU
Bavaria	229	Landshut	Wolfgang Götzer	CSU
Bavaria	230	Passau	Klaus Rose	CSU
Bavaria	231	Rottal-Inn	Max Straubinger	CSU
Bavaria	232	Straubing	Ernst Hinsken	CSU
Bavaria	233	Amberg	Rudolf Kraus	CSU
Bavaria	234	Regensburg	Maria Eichhorn	CSU
Bavaria	235	Schwandorf	Klaus Hofbauer	CSU
Bavaria	236	Weiden	Georg Girisch	CSU
Bavaria	237	Bamberg	Thomas Silberhorn	CSU
Bavaria	238	Bayreuth	Hartmut Koschyk	CSU
Bavaria	239	Coburg	Hans Michelbach	CSU
Bavaria	240	Hof	Hans-Peter Friedrich	CSU
Bavaria	241	Kulmbach	Karl-Theodor zu Guttenberg	CSU
Bavaria	242	Ansbach	Josef Göppel	CSU
Bavaria	243	Erlangen	Stefan Müller	CSU
Bavaria	244	Fürth	Christian Schmidt	CSU
Bavaria	245	Nuremberg North	Dagmar Wöhrl	CSU
Bavaria	246	Nuremberg South	Renate Blank	CSU
Bavaria	247	Roth	Marlene Mortler	CSU
Bavaria	248	Aschaffenburg	Norbert Geis	CSU
Bavaria	249	Bad Kissingen	Eduard Lintner	CSU
Bavaria	250	Main-Spessart	Wolfgang Zöller	CSU
Bavaria	251	Schweinfurt	Michael Glos	CSU
Bavaria	252	Würzburg	Wolfgang Bötsch	CSU
Bavaria	253	Augsburg-Stadt	Christian Ruck	CSU
Bavaria	254	Augsburg-Land	Eduard Oswald	CSU
Bavaria	255	Donau-Ries	Hans Raidel	CSU
Bavaria	256	Neu-Ulm	Georg Nüßlein	CSU
Bavaria	257	Oberallgäu	Gerd Müller	CSU
Bavaria	258	Ostallgäu	Kurt Rossmanith	CSU
Bavaria	List		Klaus Barthel	SPD
Bavaria	List		Hans Büttner (Note: Hans Büttner died on 18 September 2004.)	SPD
Bavaria	List		Petra Ernstberger	SPD
Bavaria	List		Gabriele Fograscher	SPD
Bavaria	List		Günter Gloser	SPD
Bavaria	List		Angelika Graf	SPD
Bavaria	List		Frank Hofmann	SPD
Bavaria	List		Brunhilde Irber	SPD
Bavaria	List		Susanne Kastner	SPD
Bavaria	List		Heinz Köhler	SPD
Bavaria	List		Walter Kolbow	SPD
Bavaria	List		Anette Kramme	SPD
Bavaria	List		Horst Kubatschka	SPD
Bavaria	List		Heinz Paula	SPD
Bavaria	List		Florian Pronold	SPD
Bavaria	List		Marlene Rupprecht	SPD
Bavaria	List		Otto Schily	SPD
Bavaria	List		Horst Schmidbauer	SPD
Bavaria	List		Fritz Schösser	SPD
Bavaria	List		Erika Simm	SPD
Bavaria	List		Sigrid Skarpelis-Sperk	SPD
Bavaria	List		Ludwig Stiegler	SPD
Bavaria	List		Jella Teuchner	SPD
Bavaria	List		Verena Wohlleben	SPD
Bavaria	List		Heidemarie Wright	SPD
Bavaria	List		Bärbel Kofler (Note: Bärbel Kofler took office on 21 September 2004, to succeed Hans Büttner.)	SPD
Bavaria	List		Albert Dess (Note: Albert Dess resigned on 19 July 2004.)	CSU
Bavaria	List		Georg Fahrenschon	CSU
Bavaria	List		Gerlinde Kaupa	CSU
Bavaria	List		Barbara Lanzinger	CSU
Bavaria	List		Dorothee Bär	CSU
Bavaria	List		Doris Meyer	CSU
Bavaria	List		Melanie Oßwald	CSU
Bavaria	List		Daniela Ludwig	CSU
Bavaria	List		Hannelore Roedel	CSU
Bavaria	List		Albert Rupprecht	CSU
Bavaria	List		Andreas Scheuer	CSU
Bavaria	List		Matthias Sehling	CSU
Bavaria	List		Marion Seib	CSU
Bavaria	List		Johannes Singhammer	CSU
Bavaria	List		Matthäus Strebl	CSU
Bavaria	List		Artur Auernhammer (Note: Artur Auernhammer took office on 29 July 2004, to succeed Albert Dess.)	CSU
Bavaria	List		Ekin Deligöz	Greens
Bavaria	List		Hans-Josef Fell	Greens
Bavaria	List		Jerzy Montag	Greens
Bavaria	List		Claudia Roth	Greens
Bavaria	List		Christine Scheel	Greens
Bavaria	List		Albert Schmidt	Greens
Bavaria	List		Ursula Sowa	Greens
Bavaria	List		Horst Friedrich	FDP
Bavaria	List		Sabine Leutheusser-Schnarrenberger	FDP
Bavaria	List		Max Stadler	FDP
Bavaria	List		Rainer Stinner	FDP
Baden-Württemberg	259	Stuttgart I	Ernst Ulrich von Weizsäcker	SPD
Baden-Württemberg	260	Stuttgart II	Ute Kumpf	SPD
Baden-Württemberg	261	Böblingen	Clemens Binninger	CDU
Baden-Württemberg	262	Esslingen	Markus Grübel	CDU
Baden-Württemberg	263	Nürtingen	Michael Hennrich	CDU
Baden-Württemberg	264	Göppingen	Klaus Riegert	CDU
Baden-Württemberg	265	Waiblingen	Joachim Pfeiffer	CDU
Baden-Württemberg	266	Ludwigsburg	Matthias Wissmann	CDU
Baden-Württemberg	267	Neckar-Zaber	Eberhard Gienger	CDU
Baden-Württemberg	268	Heilbronn	Thomas Strobl	CDU
Baden-Württemberg	269	Schwäbisch Hall – Hohenlohe	Christian von Stetten	CDU
Baden-Württemberg	270	Backnang – Schwäbisch Gmünd	Norbert Barthle	CDU
Baden-Württemberg	271	Aalen – Heidenheim	Georg Brunnhuber	CDU
Baden-Württemberg	272	Karlsruhe-Stadt	Brigitte Wimmer	SPD
Baden-Württemberg	273	Karlsruhe-Land	Axel Fischer	CDU
Baden-Württemberg	274	Rastatt	Peter Götz	CDU
Baden-Württemberg	275	Heidelberg	Lothar Binding	SPD
Baden-Württemberg	276	Mannheim	Lothar Mark	SPD
Baden-Württemberg	277	Odenwald – Tauber	Kurt Segner	CDU
Baden-Württemberg	278	Rhein-Neckar	Bernd Schmidbauer	CDU
Baden-Württemberg	279	Bruchsal – Schwetzingen	Olav Gutting	CDU
Baden-Württemberg	280	Pforzheim	Gunther Krichbaum	CDU
Baden-Württemberg	281	Calw	Hans-Joachim Fuchtel	CDU
Baden-Württemberg	282	Freiburg	Gernot Erler	SPD
Baden-Württemberg	283	Lörrach – Müllheim	Marion Caspers-Merk	SPD
Baden-Württemberg	284	Emmendingen – Lahr	Peter Weiß	CDU
Baden-Württemberg	285	Offenburg	Wolfgang Schäuble	CDU
Baden-Württemberg	286	Rottweil – Tuttlingen	Volker Kauder	CDU
Baden-Württemberg	287	Schwarzwald-Baar	Siegfried Kauder	CDU
Baden-Württemberg	288	Konstanz	Hans-Peter Repnik	CDU
Baden-Württemberg	289	Waldshut	Thomas Dörflinger	CDU
Baden-Württemberg	290	Reutlingen	Ernst-Reinhard Beck	CDU
Baden-Württemberg	291	Tübingen	Annette Widmann-Mauz	CDU
Baden-Württemberg	292	Ulm	Heinz Seiffert (Note: Heinz Seiffert resigned on 18 July 2005.)	CDU
Baden-Württemberg	293	Biberach	Franz Romer	CDU
Baden-Württemberg	294	Ravensburg – Bodensee	Andreas Schockenhoff	CDU
Baden-Württemberg	295	Zollernalb – Sigmaringen	Tanja Gönner (Note: Tanja Gönner resigned on 13 July 2004.)	CDU
Baden-Württemberg	List		Rainer Arnold	SPD
Baden-Württemberg	List		Hermann Bachmaier	SPD
Baden-Württemberg	List		Rudolf Bindig	SPD
Baden-Württemberg	List		Hans Martin Bury	SPD
Baden-Württemberg	List		Herta Däubler-Gmelin	SPD
Baden-Württemberg	List		Peter Dreßen	SPD
Baden-Württemberg	List		Marga Elser	SPD
Baden-Württemberg	List		Renate Gradistanac	SPD
Baden-Württemberg	List		Klaus Kirschner	SPD
Baden-Württemberg	List		Nicolette Kressl	SPD
Baden-Württemberg	List		Christian Lange	SPD
Baden-Württemberg	List		Hilde Mattheis	SPD
Baden-Württemberg	List		Karin Rehbock-Zureich	SPD
Baden-Württemberg	List		Walter Riester	SPD
Baden-Württemberg	List		Karin Roth	SPD
Baden-Württemberg	List		Hermann Scheer	SPD
Baden-Württemberg	List		Jörg Tauss	SPD
Baden-Württemberg	List		Ute Vogt	SPD
Baden-Württemberg	List		Matthias Weisheit (Note: Matthias Weisheit died on 17 May 2004.)	SPD
Baden-Württemberg	List		Gert Weisskirchen	SPD
Baden-Württemberg	List		Elvira Drobinski-Weiß (Note: Elvira Drobinski-Weiß took office on 18 May 2004, to succeed Matthias Weisheit.)	SPD
Baden-Württemberg	List		Kerstin Andreae	Greens
Baden-Württemberg	List		Birgitt Bender	Greens
Baden-Württemberg	List		Alexander Bonde	Greens
Baden-Württemberg	List		Uschi Eid	Greens
Baden-Württemberg	List		Winfried Hermann	Greens
Baden-Württemberg	List		Fritz Kuhn	Greens
Baden-Württemberg	List		Rezzo Schlauch	Greens
Baden-Württemberg	List		Petra Selg	Greens
Baden-Württemberg	List		Antje Vogel-Sperl	Greens
Baden-Württemberg	List		Ernst Burgbacher	FDP
Baden-Württemberg	List		Ulrich Heinrich	FDP
Baden-Württemberg	List		Birgit Homburger	FDP
Baden-Württemberg	List		Sibylle Laurischk	FDP
Baden-Württemberg	List		Harald Leibrecht	FDP
Baden-Württemberg	List		Dirk Niebel	FDP
Baden-Württemberg	List		Egon Jüttner	CDU
Baden-Württemberg	List		Karl A. Lamers	CDU
Baden-Württemberg	List		Conny Mayer	CDU
Baden-Württemberg	List		Ingo Wellenreuther	CDU
Baden-Württemberg	List		Angela Schmid (Note: Angela Schmid took office on 28 July 2004, to succeed Tanja Gönner.)	CDU
Baden-Württemberg	List		Dorothea Störr-Ritter (Note: Dorothea Störr-Ritter took office on 18 July 2005, to succeed Heinz Seiffert.)	CDU
Saarland	296	Saarbrücken	Elke Ferner	SPD
Saarland	297	Saarlouis	Ottmar Schreiner	SPD
Saarland	298	St. Wendel	Hans-Georg Wagner	SPD
Saarland	299	Homburg	Astrid Klug	SPD
Saarland	List		Peter Altmaier	CDU
Saarland	List		Albrecht Feibel	CDU
Saarland	List		Helmut Rauber	CDU
Saarland	List		Hubert Ulrich (Note: Hubert Ulrich resigned on 19 October 2004.)	Greens
Saarland	List		Jutta Krüger-Jacob (Note: Jutta Krüger-Jacob took office on 19 October 2004, to succeed Hubert Ulrich.)	Greens
Saarland	List		Christoph Hartmann (Note: Christoph Hartmann resigned on 1 November 2004.)	FDP
Saarland	List		Karl Addicks (Note: Karl Addicks took office on 1 November 2004, to succeed Christoph Hartmann.)	FDP

== See also ==
- Politics of Germany
- List of Bundestag Members
