= 2014 Saarland local elections =

Local elections in Germany

- 25 May 2014

204 district council seats 1,764 municipal council seats
- Turnout: 432,444 (52.48%) ▼4.86% 432,158 (52.52%) ▼3.76%
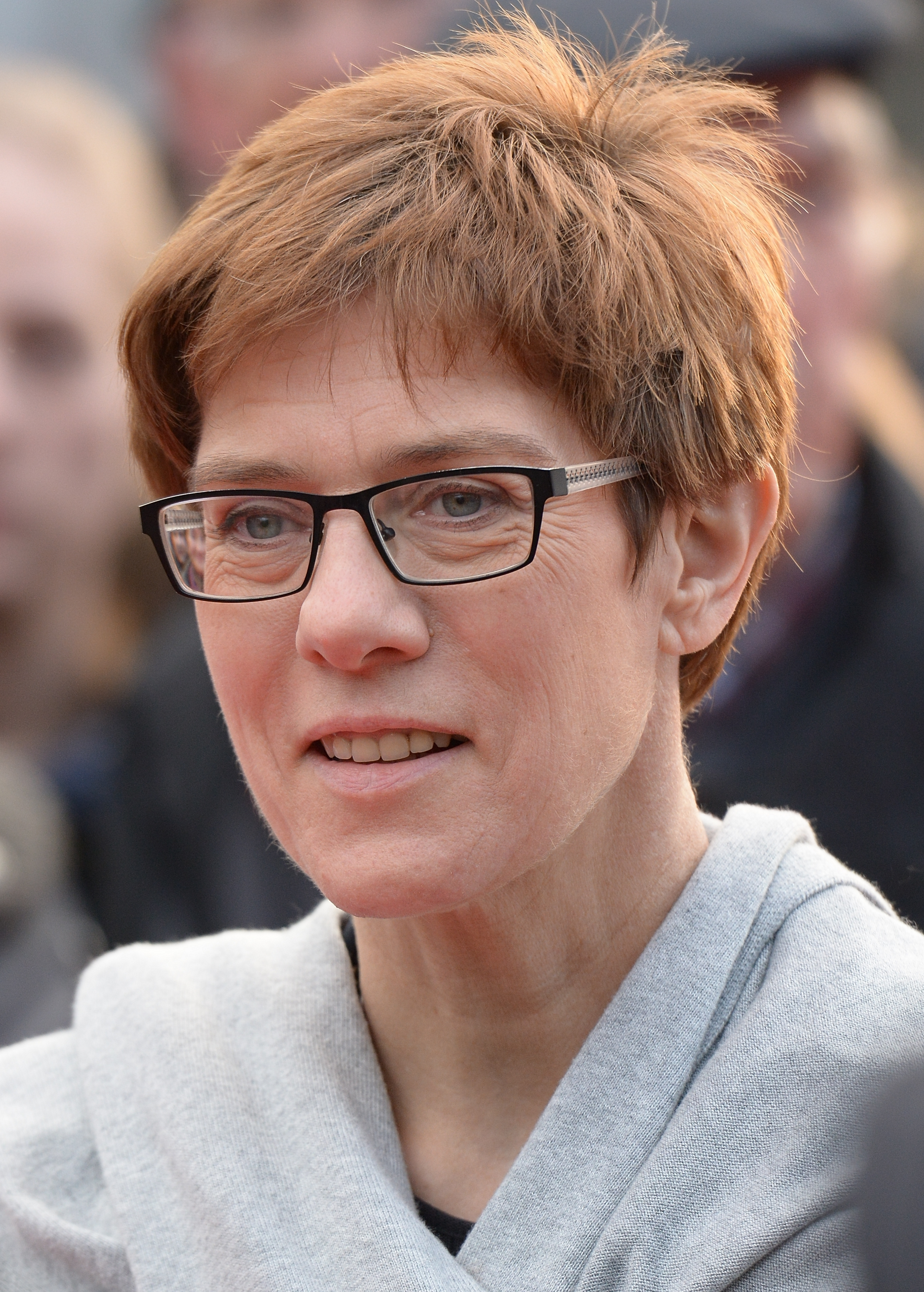

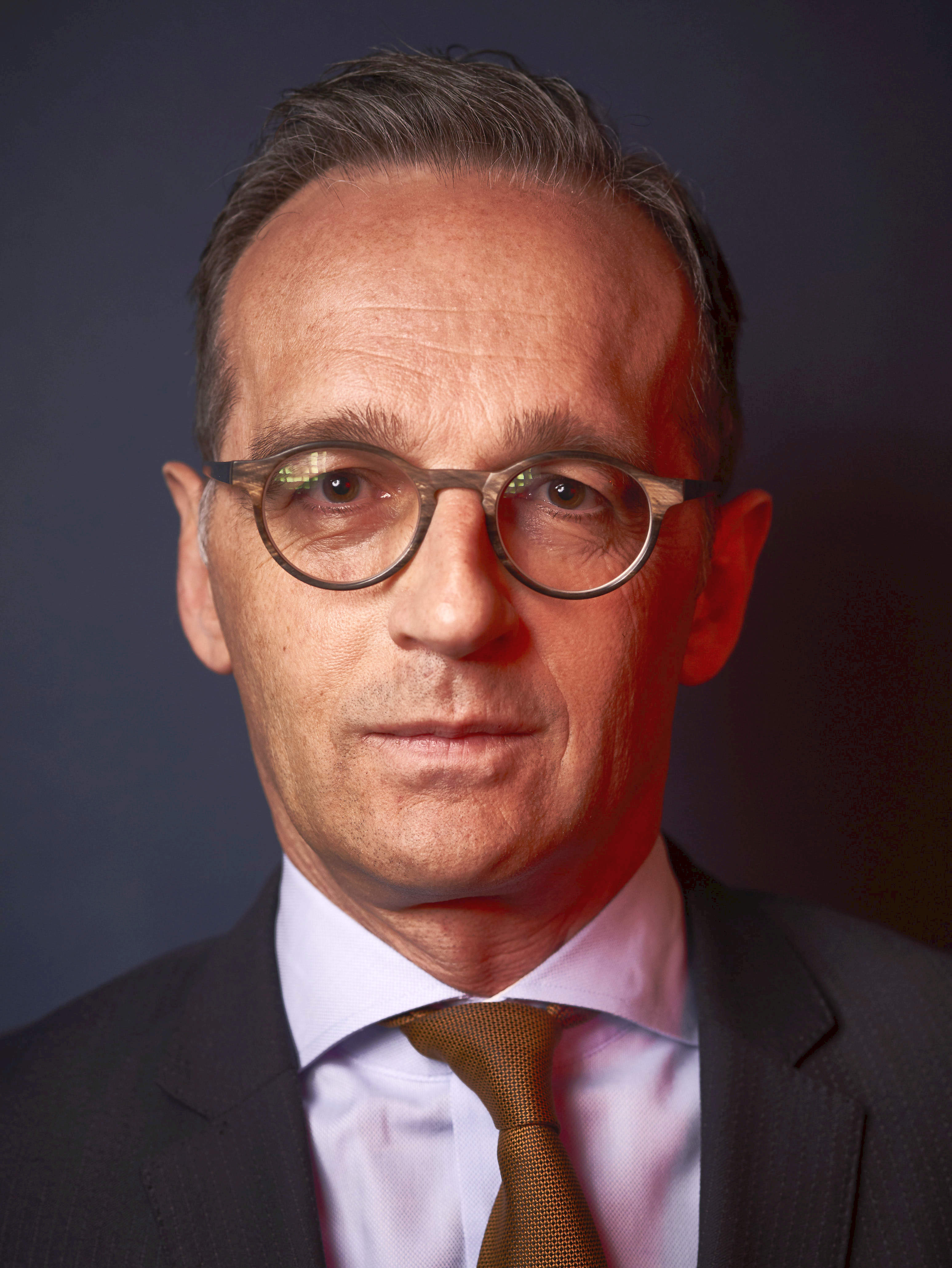

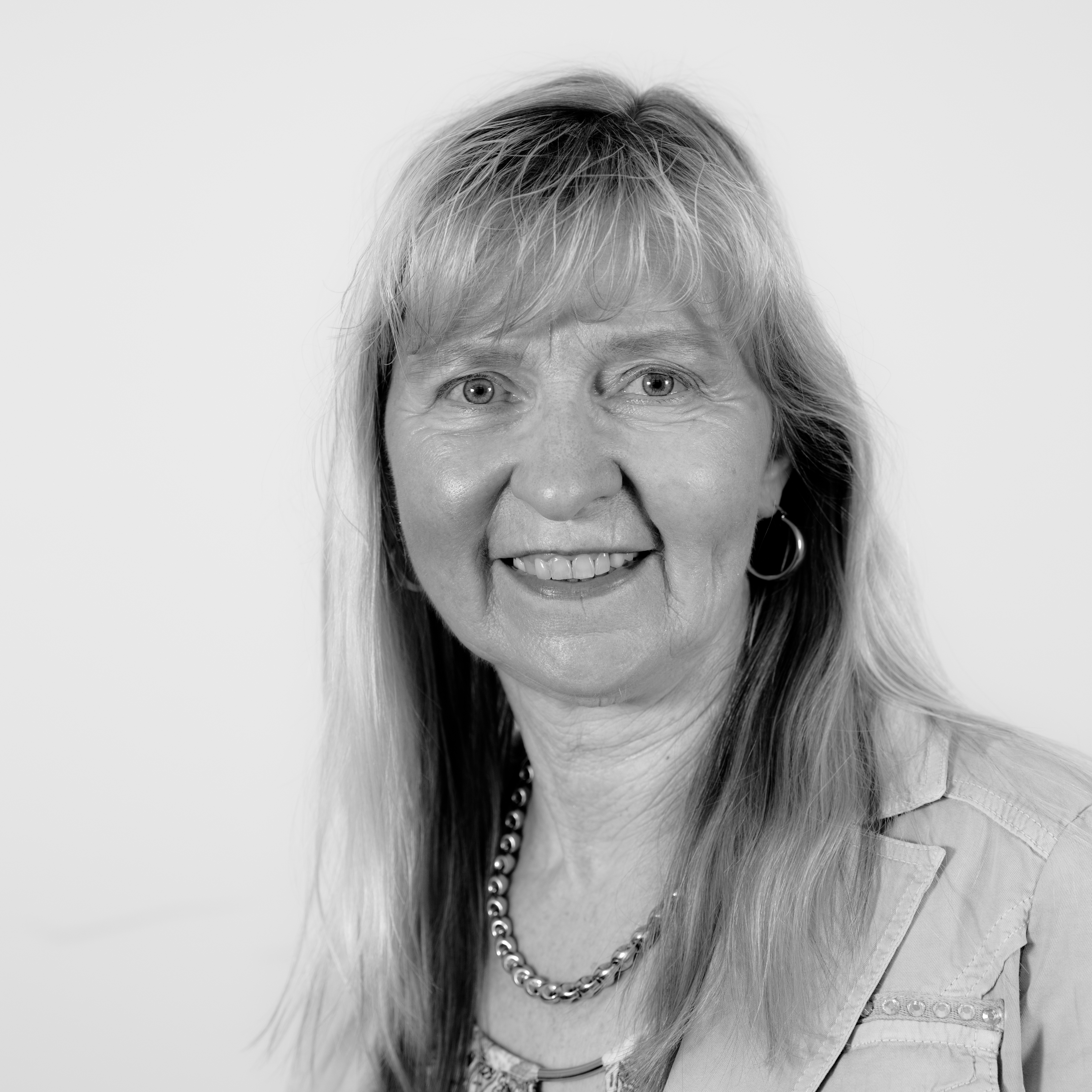

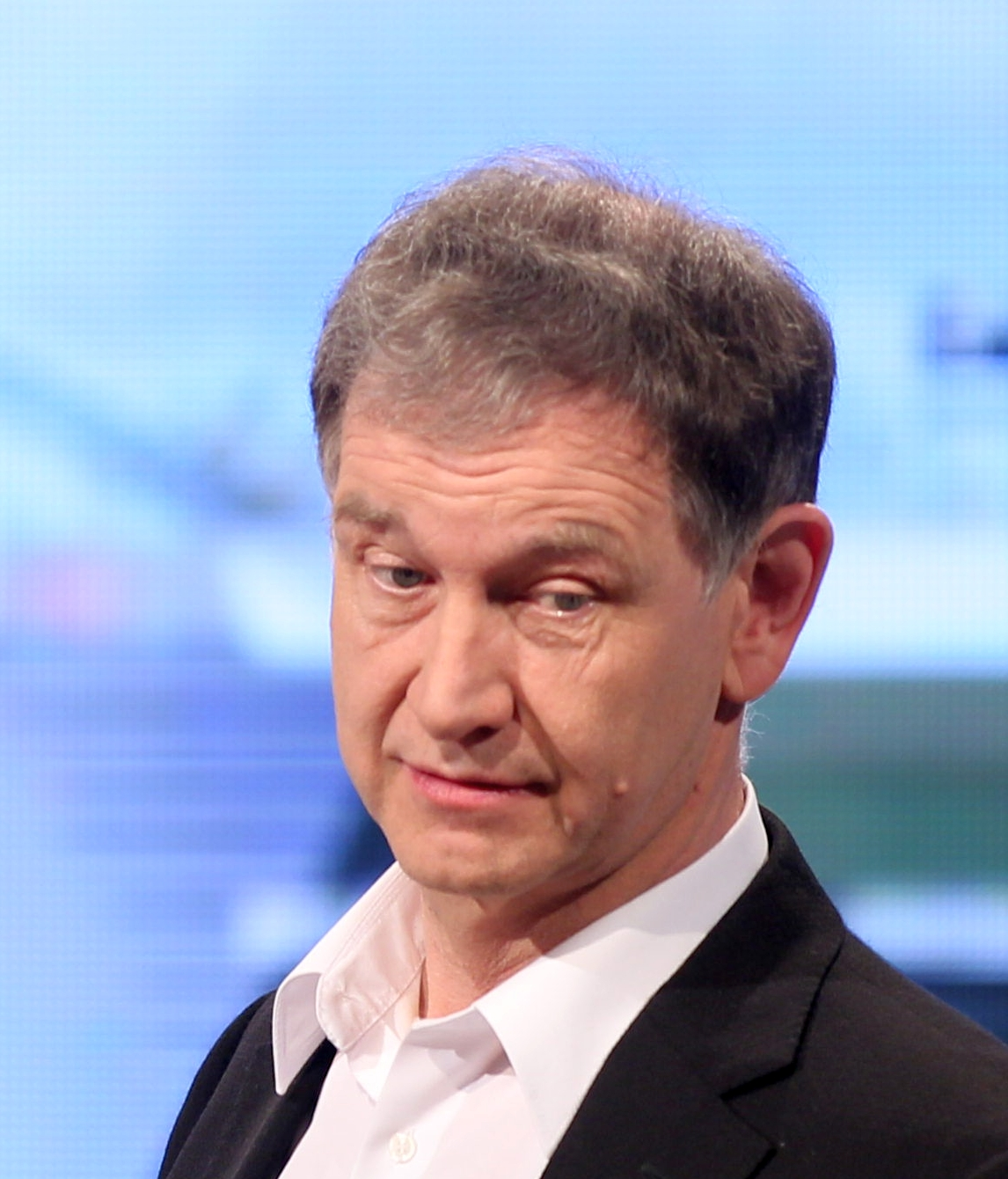

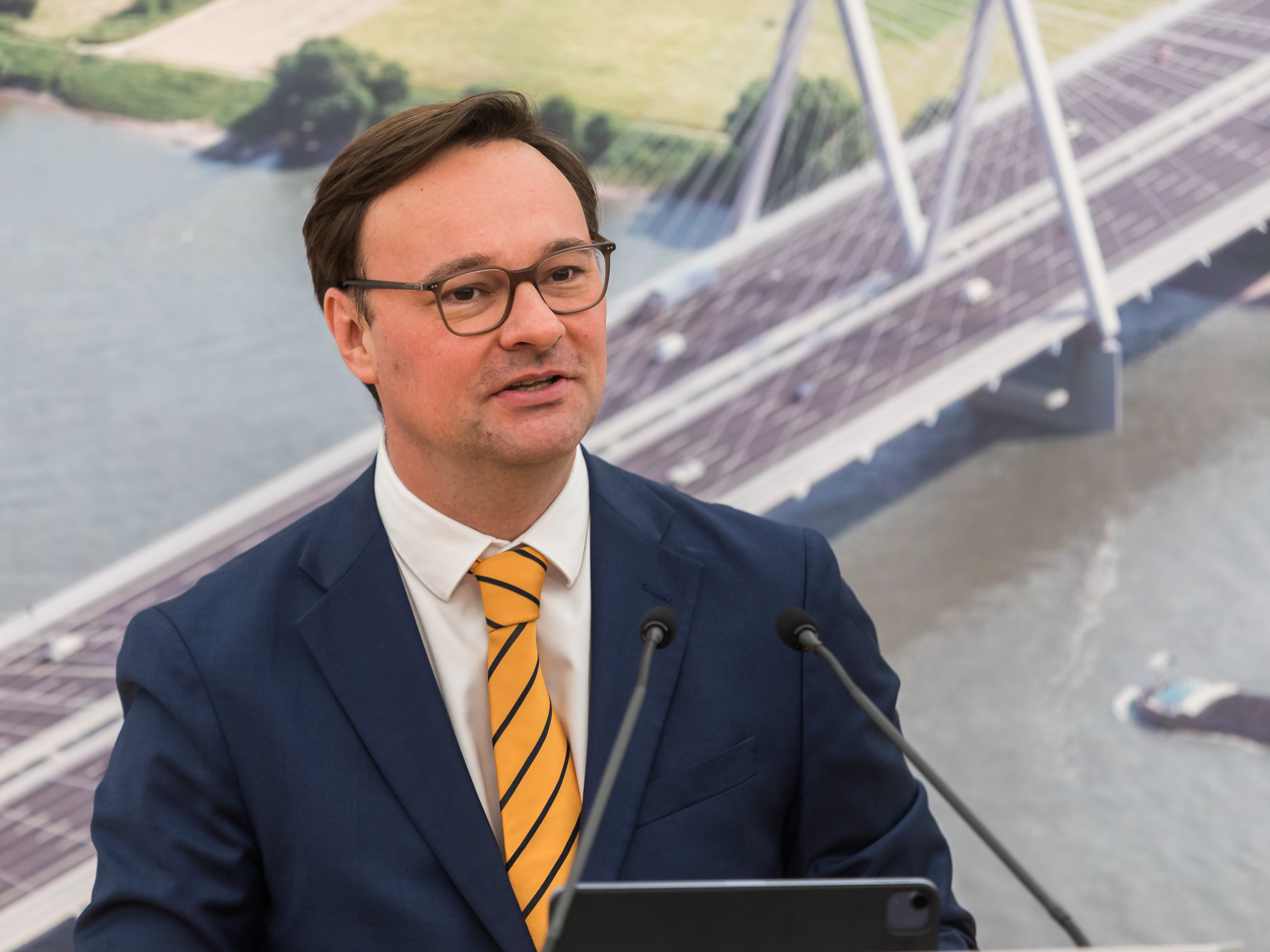

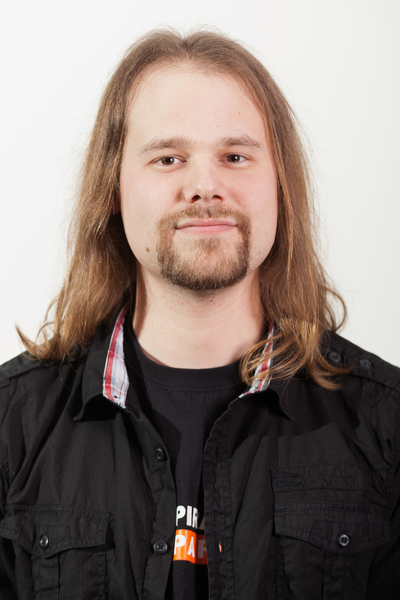
	First party	Second party	Third party
Leader	Annegret Kramp-Karrenbauer	Heiko Maas	Astrid Schramm
Party	CDU	SPD	Linke
Last election	83 seats, 36.67% 704 seats, 37.28%	71 seats, 32.26% 619 seats, 33.46%	25 seats, 12.86% 165 seats, 10.72%
Seats won	87; 745	77; 683	14; 106
Seat change	▲4 ▲41	▲6 ▲64	▼11 ▼59
Popular vote	160,939; 163,161	145,758; 151,800	30,668; 30,742
Percentage	38.32% 38.76%	34.71% 36.06%	7.30% 7.30%
Swing	▲1.65% ▲1.48%	▲2.45% ▲2.60%	▼5.56% ▼3.42%
	Fourth party	Fifth party	Sixth party
Leader	Hubert Ulrich & Claudia Willger	Johannes Trampert	Oliver Luksic
Party	Greens	AfD	FDP
Last election	12 seats, 6.49% 75 seats, 5.89%	Did not exist	14 seats, 7.23% 83 seats, 6.27%
Seats won	10; 72	9; 21	2; 27
Seat change	▼2 ▼3	New	▼12 ▼56
Popular vote	25,740; 23,608	22,459; 8,603	10,286; 11,146
Percentage	6.13% 5.61%	5.35% 2.04%	2.45% 2.65%
Swing	▼0.36% ▼0.28%	New	▼4.78% ▼3.62%
	Seventh party
Leader	Michael Hilberer
Party	Pirates
Last election	Did not exist
Seats won	2; 9
Seat change	New
Popular vote	10,238; 4,500
Percentage	2.37% 1.07%
Swing	New

The 2014 Saarland local elections were held on May 25, 2014 to elect members of Saarland's 6 district councils and 52 municipal councils. The elections were held on the same day as the 2014 European Parliament election in Germany.

== Results ==
Both of Germany's two historically dominant political parties, Christian Democratic Union and Social Democratic Party, gained seats in the election. The election also marked the local debut of the Alternative for Germany (AfD) and Pirate Party, both of which won a number of seats on both the district and municipal level. Meanwhile, both Die Linke and the Free Democratic Party (FDP) lost a significant number of seats.

Summary of results for the 2014 Saarland local elections
Party	Votes (District)	%	+/-	Seats	+/-	Votes (Municipal)	%	+/-	Seats	+/-
Christian Democratic Union (CDU)	160,939	38.32	▲1.65	87	▲4	163,161	38.76	▲1.48	745	▲41
Social Democratic Party (SPD)	145,758	34.71	▲2.45	77	▲6	151,800	36.06	▲2.60	683	▲64
Die Linke	30,668	7.30	▼5.56	14	▼11	30,742	7.30	▼3.42	106	▼59
The Greens (Grüne)	25,740	6.13	▼0.36	10	▼2	23,608	5.71	▼0.28	72	▼3
Alternative for Germany (AfD)	22,459	5.35	New	9	New	8,603	2.04	New	21	New
Free Democratic Party (FDP)	10,286	2.45	▼4.78	2	▼12	11,146	2.65	▼3.62	27	▼56
Pirate Party Germany	10,238	2.37	New	2	New	4,500	1.07	New	9	New
Local voters' associations	7,656	1.82	▼1.43	1	▼3	23,064	5.48	▲0.18	92	▼2
National Democratic Party (NPD)	3,740	0.89	▲0.33	1	▲1	1,904	0.45	▼0.12	2	▼1
Family Party	2,466	0.59	▼0.08	1	0	1,929	0.46	▼0.02	6	0
German Communist Party (DKP)	–	–	–	–	–	281	0.07	▼0.10	1	▼2
Party for Labour, Environment and Family (AUF)	–	–	–	–	–	202	0.05	▲0.01	1	0
Total	419,950	97.11	▲0.37	204	▼6	420,940	97.40	▲1.34	1,764	▲9
Invalid votes	12,494	2.89	▼0.37			11,218	2.60	▼1.34		
Voter turnout	432,444	52.49	▼4.86			432,158	52.52	▼3.76		
Eligible voters	823,920					822,782				
