= 2009 Saarland local elections =

2009 local elections in Saarland, Germany

- 7 June 2009

210 district council seats 1,753 municipal council seats
- Turnout: 477,989 (57.21%) ▲1.08% 471,620 (57.34%) ▲1.06%
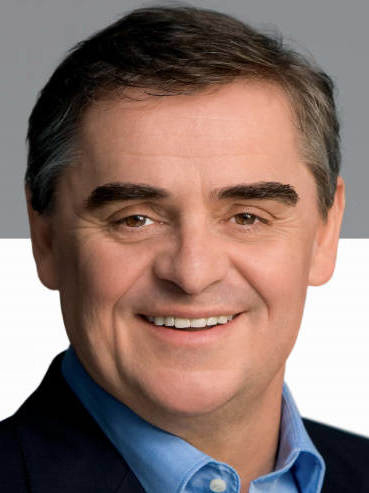

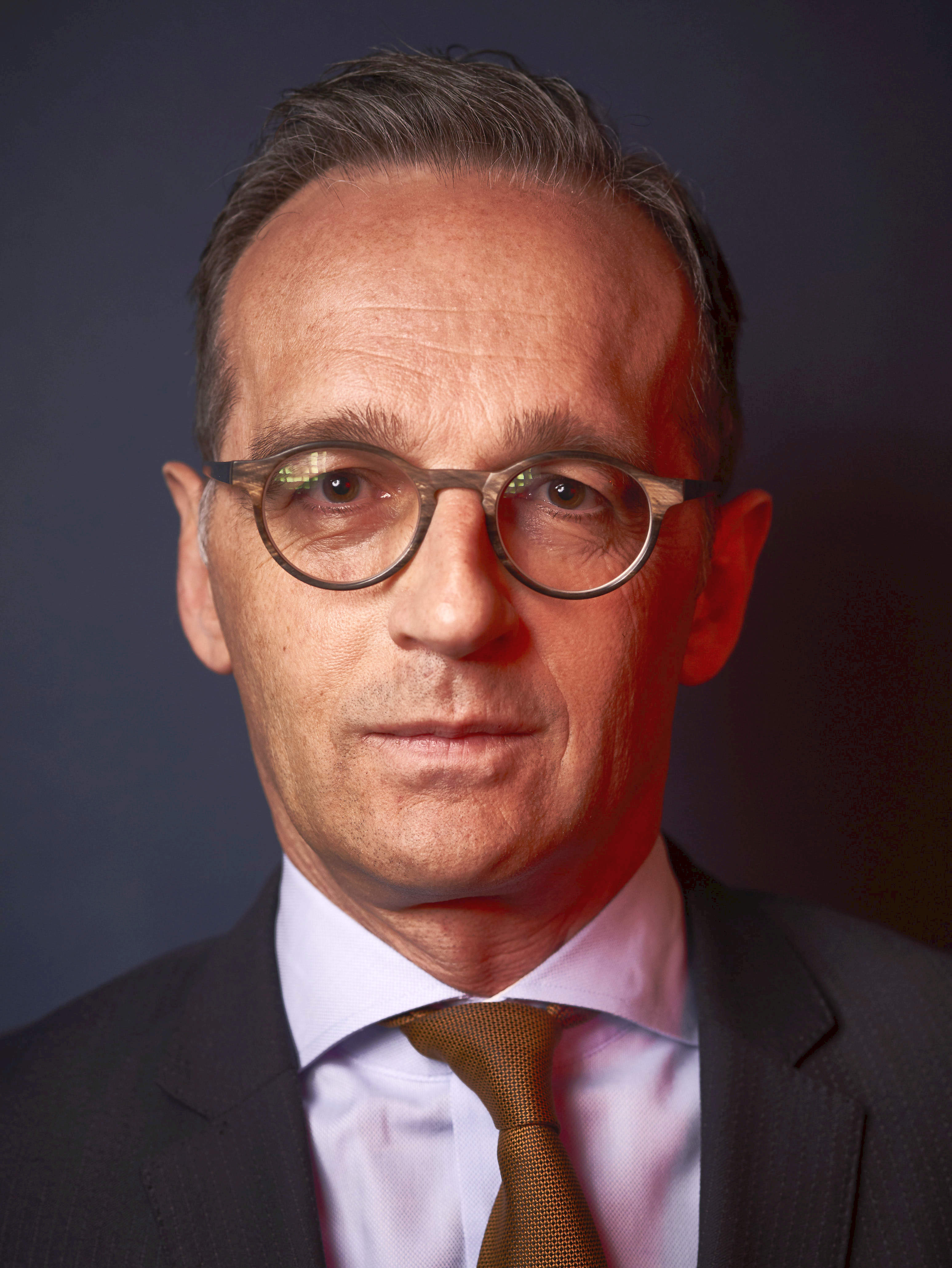

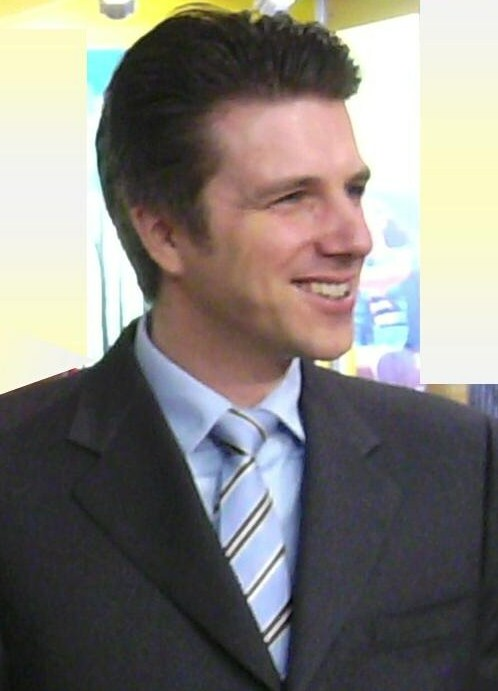

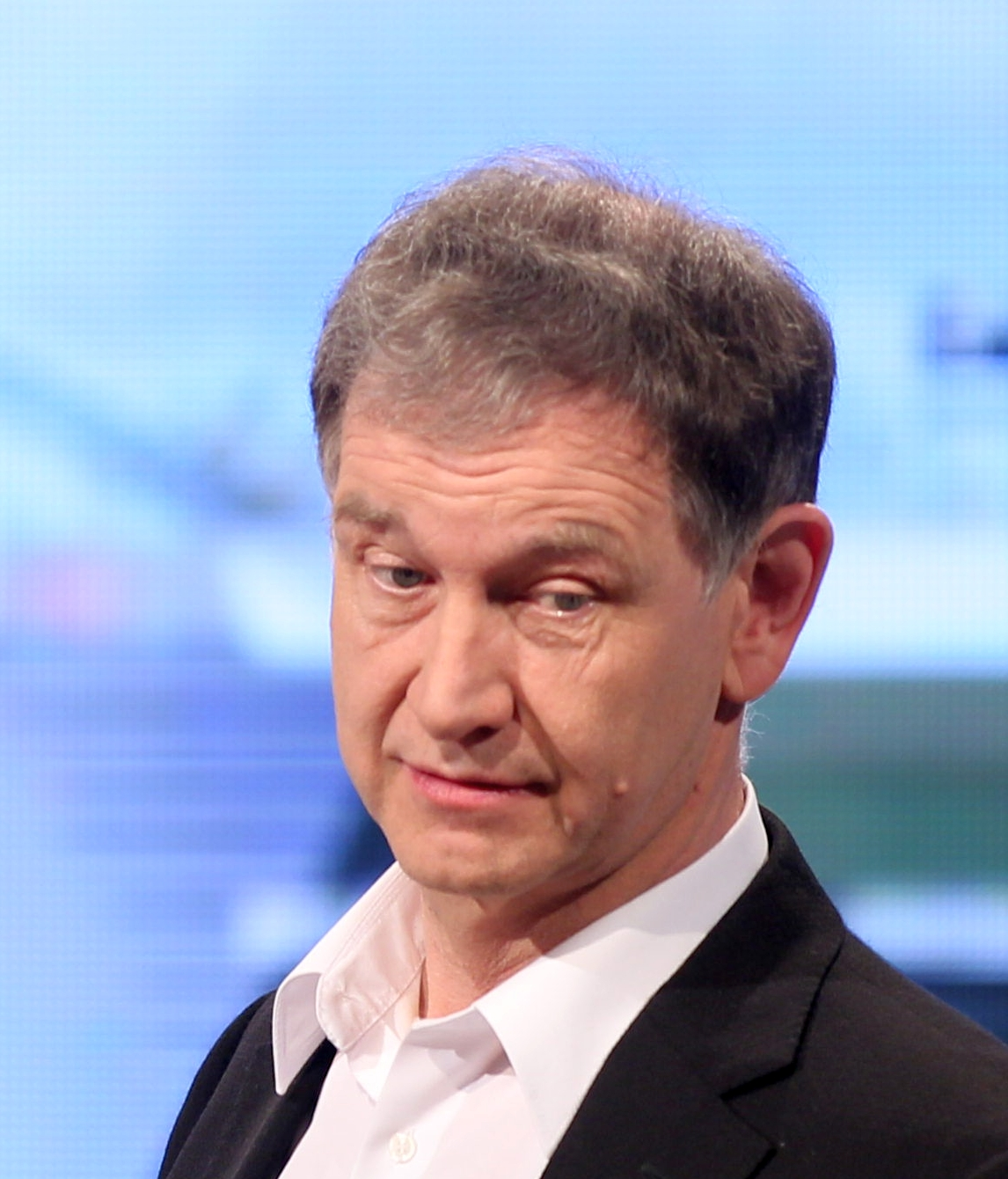
	First party	Second party	Third party
Leader	Peter Müller	Heiko Maas	Rolf Linsler
Party	CDU	SPD	Linke
Last election	112 seats, 47.00% 904 seats, 45.75%	84 seats, 36.05% 706 seats, 37.34%	0 seats, 1.89% (Note: As the Party of Democratic Socialism); 0 seats, 0.44% (Note: As the Party of Democratic Socialism)
Seats won	83; 704	71; 619	25; 165
Seat change	▼29 ▼200	▼13 ▼87	▲25 ▲165
Popular vote	169,535; 171,045	149,167; 153,527	59,451; 49,197
Percentage	36.67% 37.28%	32.26% 33.46%	12.86% 10.72%
Swing	▼10.33% ▼8.47%	▼3.79% ▼3.88%	▲10.97% ▲10.28%
	Fourth party	Fifth party
Leader	Christoph Hartmann	Hubert Ulrich & Claudia Willger
Party	FDP	Greens
Last election	2 seats, 4.31% 35 seats, 3.89%	8 seats, 5.83% 36 seats, 4.84%
Seats won	14; 83	12; 75
Seat change	▲12 ▲48	▲4 ▲39
Popular vote	33,458; 28,793	30,011; 27,011
Percentage	7.23% 6.27%	6.49% 5.89%
Swing	▲2.92% ▲2.38%	▲0.66% ▲1.05%

The 2009 Saarland local elections were held on June 7, 2009 to elect members of Saarland's district councils and municipal councils. The elections were held on the same day as the 2009 European Parliament election in Germany.

== Results ==
Germany's two historically dominant political parties, the Christian Democratic Union and the Social Democratic Party, suffered significant losses, to the benefit of smaller parties. Die Linke was the biggest beneficiary of this trend, having emerged as a party from the unification of the Party of Democratic Socialism and Labour and Social Justice – The Electoral Alternative in 2007.

Summary of results for the 2009 Saarland local elections
Party	Votes (District)	%	+/-	Seats	+/-	Votes (Municipal)	%	+/-	Seats	+/-
Christian Democratic Union (CDU)	169,535	36.67	▼10.33	83	▼29	171,045	37.28	▼8.47	704	▼200
Social Democratic Party (SPD)	149,167	32.26	▼3.79	71	▼13	153,527	33.46	▼3.88	619	▼87
Die Linke	59,451	12.86	▲10.97	25	▲25	49,197	10.72	▲10.28	125	▲125
Free Democratic Party (FDP)	33,458	7.23	▲2.92	14	▲12	28,793	6.27	▲2.38	83	▲48
The Greens (Grüne)	30,011	6.49	▲0.66	12	▲4	27,011	5.89	▲1.05	75	▲39
Local voters' associations	15,011	3.25	▲2.31	4	▲2	24,320	5.30	▼2.34	94	▲47
Family Party	3,109	0.67	▼0.20	1	▼1	2,211	0.48	▲0.16	6	▲2
National Democratic Party (NPD)	2,615	0.57	▼0.64	0	0	1,802	0.39	▼0.50	3	▼2
German Communist Party (DKP)	–	–	–	–	–	768	0.17	▼0.16	3	▼3
Party for Labour, Environment and Family (AUF)	–	–	–	–	–	197	0.04	New	1	New
Total	462,357	96.73	▲1.50	210	0	458,871	97.30	▲1.24	1,753	▼47
Invalid votes	15,632	3.27	▼1.50			12,749	2.70	▼1.24		
Voter turnout	477,989	57.21	▲1.08			471,620	57.34	▲1.06		
Eligible voters	835,447					822,441				
