= 2009 Saarland state election =

State election in Saarland, Germany

- 30 August 2009

All 51 seats in the Landtag of Saarland 26 seats needed for a majority
- Turnout: 534,793 (67.6%) ▲12.1%
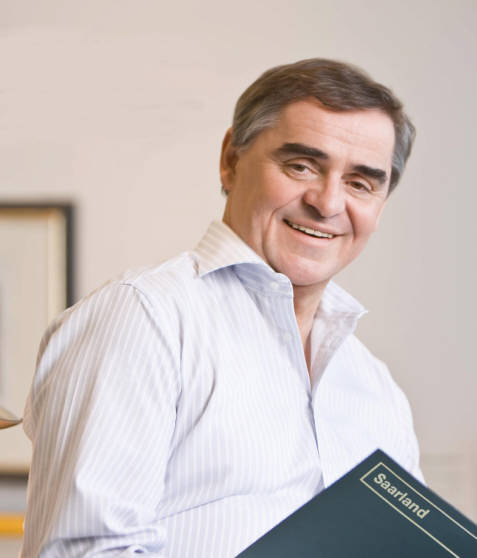

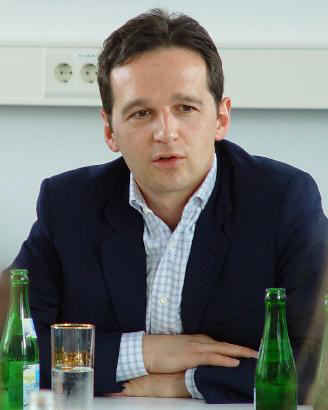

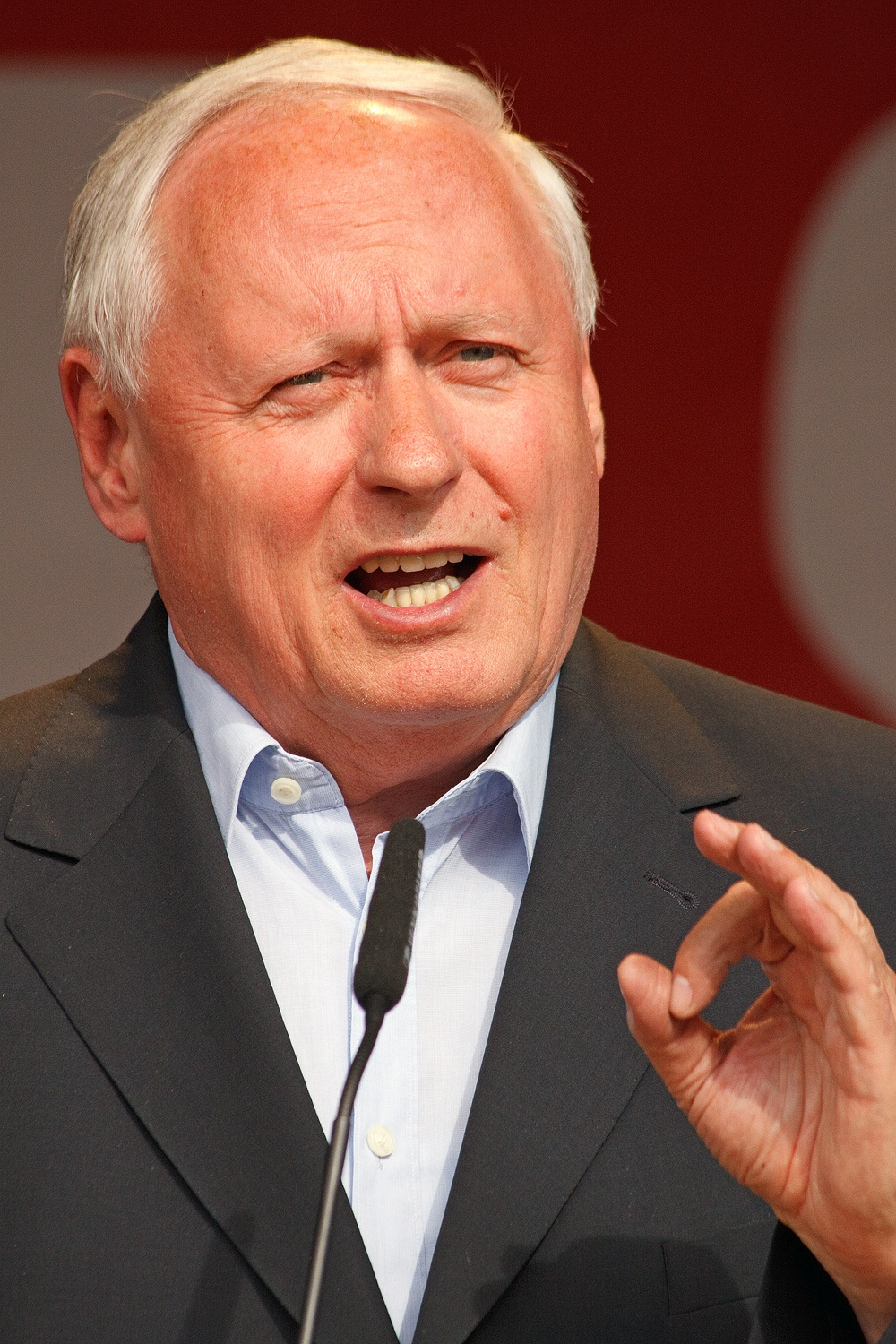

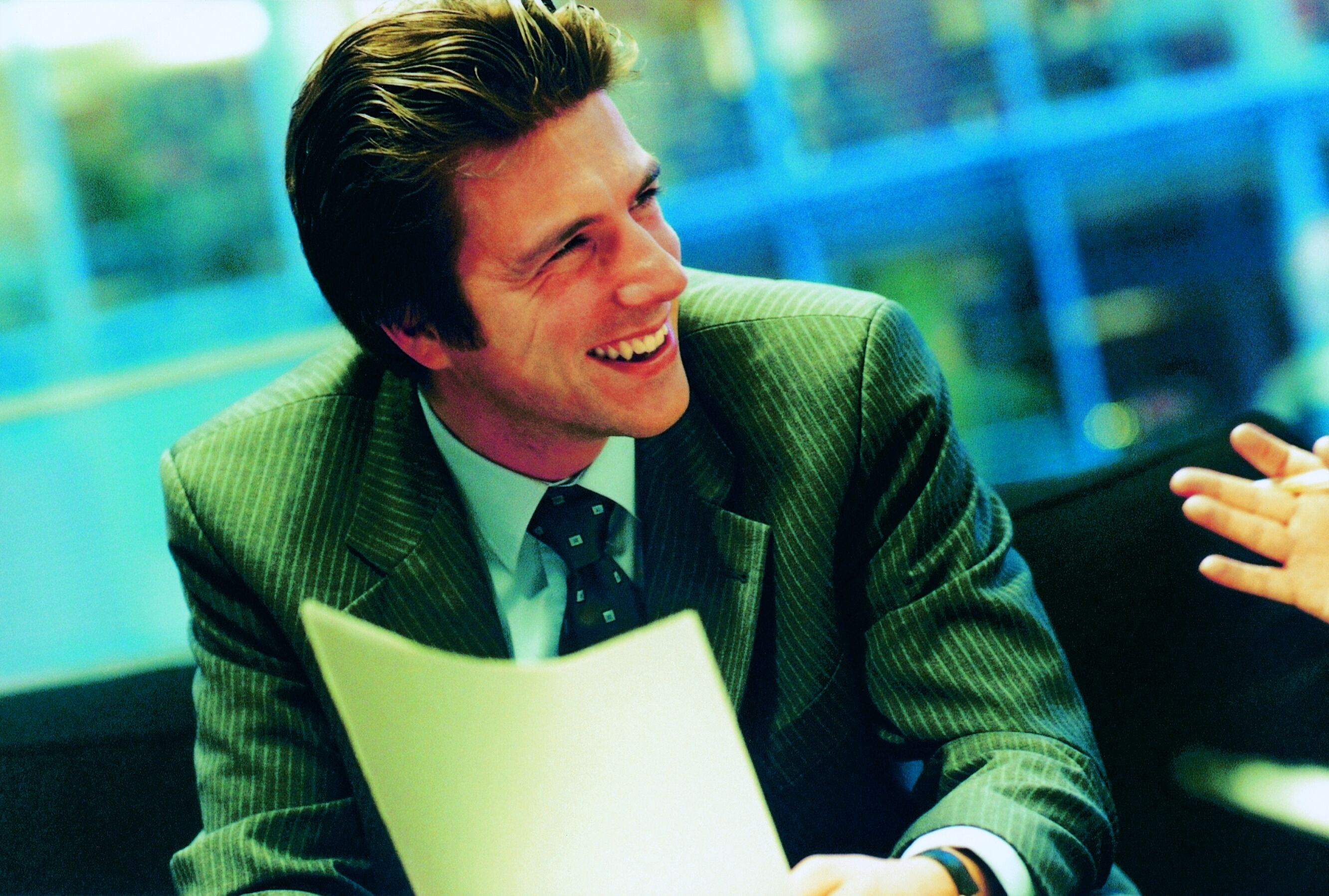

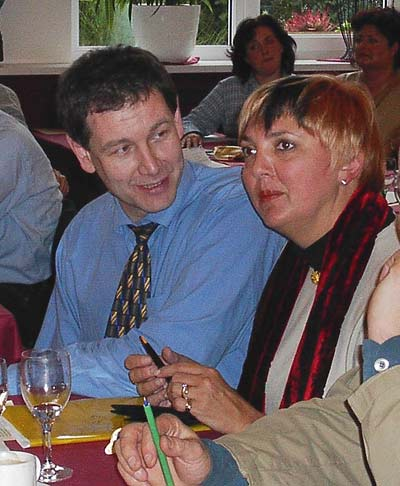
	First party	Second party	Third party
Leader	Peter Müller	Heiko Maas	Oskar Lafontaine
Party	CDU	SPD	Left
Last election	27 seats, 47.5%	18 seats, 30.8%	0 seats, 2.3% (Note: Results for PDS.)
Seats won	19	13	11
Seat change	▼8	▼5	▲11
Popular vote	184,537	131,241	113,664
Percentage	34.5%	24.5%	21.3%
Swing	▼13.0%	▼6.3%	▲19.0%
	Fourth party	Fifth party
Leader	Christoph Hartmann	Hubert Ulrich
Party	FDP	Greens
Last election	3 seats, 5.2%	3 seats, 5.6%
Seats won	5	3
Seat change	▲2	0
Popular vote	49,064	31,516
Percentage	9.2%	5.9%
Swing	▲4.0%	▲0.3%
Minister-President before election
Peter Müller
CDU
Elected Minister-President
Peter Müller
CDU

The 2009 Saarland state election was held on 30 August 2009 to elect the members of the Landtag of Saarland. It was held on the same day as state elections in Saxony and Thuringia. The incumbent Christian Democratic Union (CDU) government led by Minister-President Peter Müller lost its majority. The CDU subsequently formed a coalition with the Free Democratic Party (FDP) and The Greens, and Müller was re-elected as Minister-President. This was the first Jamaica coalition formed in Germany.

== Parties ==
The table below lists parties represented in the previous Landtag of Saarland.

Name		Ideology	Leader(s)	2004 result	
Name		Ideology	Leader(s)	Votes (%)	Seats
CDU	Christian Democratic Union of Germany; Christlich Demokratische Union Deutschlands	Christian democracy	Peter Müller	47.5%	27 / 51
SPD	Social Democratic Party of Germany; Sozialdemokratische Partei Deutschlands	Social democracy	Heiko Maas	30.8%	18 / 51
Grüne	Alliance 90/The Greens; Bündnis 90/Die Grünen	Green politics	Hubert Ulrich	5.6%	3 / 51
FDP	Free Democratic Party; Freie Demokratische Partei	Classical liberalism	Christoph Hartmann	5.2%	3 / 51

== Opinion polling ==
Polling firm	Fieldwork date	Sample size	CDU	SPD	Grüne	FDP	Linke	Others	Lead
2009 state election	30 Aug 2009	–	34.5	24.5	5.9	9.2	21.3	4.6	10.0
Forschungsgruppe Wahlen	17–20 Aug 2009	1,000	36	26	6	9	16	7	10
Infratest dimap	18–20 Aug 2009	1,000	38	26	6	9	15	6	12
Infratest dimap	20–21 Apr 2009	1,000	36	27	7	9	18	3	9
Emnid	2–10 Mar 2009	1,000	38	23	5	8	22	4	15
Infratest dimap	23–26 Oct 2008	1,000	38	25	5	6	23	3	13
dimap	11–16 Sep 2008	1,003	42	22	6	6	20	4	20
Emnid	26 Aug–2 Sep 2008	1,002	40	23	5	6	22	4	17
Forsa	25–29 Aug 2008	1,001	37	23	5	7	24	4	13
Emnid	13–27 Feb 2008	~500	40	25	7	6	19	?	15
Infratest dimap	Sep 2007	1,000	41	26	6	5	18	4	15
Emnid	30 Apr–16 May 2007	504	40	26	8	8	13	5	14
SaarZoom	Jun 2007	600	36	35	8	7	13	1	1
Infratest dimap	9–14 Nov 2006	1,000	39	34	6	7	10	4	5
Infratest	29 Aug–10 Sep 2006	1,000	38	31	5	8	13	5	7
Infratest dimap	14–17 Jul 2005	1,000	43	23	6	5	19	4	20
Infratest	27 Jan–1 Feb 2005	1,000	44	36	7	5	–	8	8
2004 state election	5 Sep 2004	–	47.5	30.8	5.6	5.2	2.3	10.9	16.7

== Election result ==
Both the CDU and SPD suffered significant losses, losing almost 20% of vote share between them. This came primarily to the benefit of The Left, which achieved by far its best result in a western state, debuting at 21.3%. The Greens and Free Democratic Party (FDP) also benefited to a lesser degree. As in a number of western states during the 2007–2009 period, the entry of The Left meant that neither the CDU–FDP nor SPD–Green coalitions won a majority.

Summary of the 30 August 2009 election results for the Landtag of Saarland
Party	Votes	%	+/-	Seats	+/-	Seats %
Christian Democratic Union (CDU)	184,537	34.5	▼13.0	19	▼8	37.3
Social Democratic Party (SPD)	131,241	24.5	▼6.3	13	▼5	25.5
The Left (Linke)	113,664	21.3	▲19.0 (Note: Compared to results for PDS.)	11	▲11 (Note: Compared to results for PDS.)	21.6
Free Democratic Party (FDP)	49,064	9.2	▲4.0	5	▲2	9.8
Alliance 90/The Greens (Grüne)	31,516	5.9	▲0.3	3	0	5.9
Family Party of Germany (FAMILIE)	10,710	2.0	▼1.0	0	±0	0
National Democratic Party (NPD)	8,099	1.5	▼2.5	0	±0	0
Others	5,962	1.1		0	±0	0
Total	534,793	100.0		51	±0	
Voter turnout		67.6	▲12.1			

Popular Vote
CDU	34.51%
SPD	24.54%
DIE LINKE	21.25%
FDP	9.17%
B'90/GRÜNE	5.89%
Other	4.63%

Landtag seats
CDU	37.25%
SPD	25.49%
DIE LINKE	21.57%
FDP	9.80%
B'90/GRÜNE	5.88%
