= Christel Happach-Kasan =

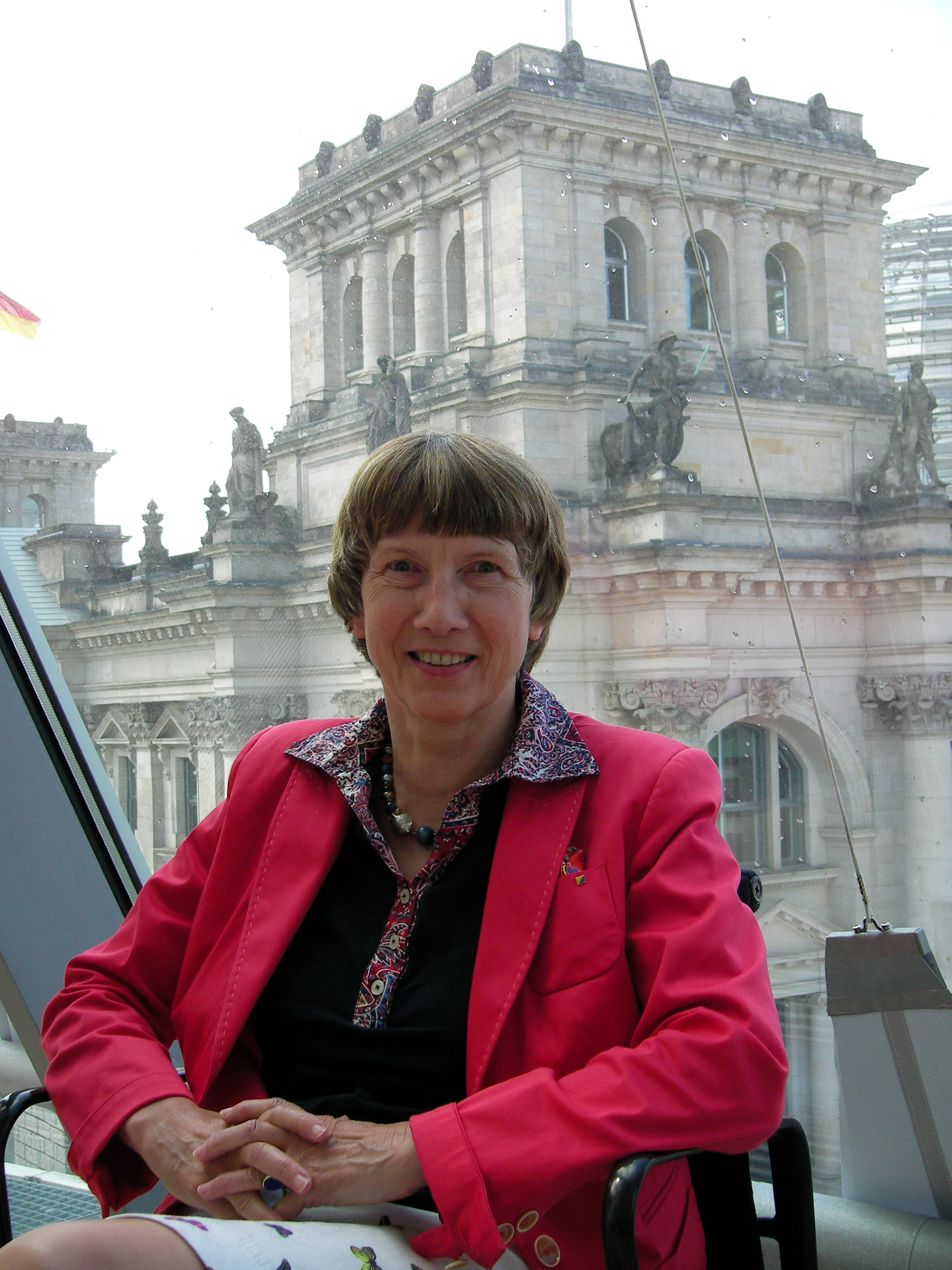
- Christel Happach-Kasan in 2013

Member of the Bundestag
- In office 10 December 2002 – 22 October 2013

Personal details
- Born: Christel Happach; 4 January 1950 (age 76) West Berlin, Germany
- Party: Free Democratic Party

Christel Happach-Kasan (née Happach; born 4 January 1950 in West Berlin) is a German politician from the Free Democratic Party (FDP).

== Biography ==
After graduating from the Lauenburgische Gelehrtenschule in Ratzeburg, Christel Happach-Kasan spent a year in the United States as an AFS scholarship recipient and subsequently began studying biology, mathematics, and education at the Philipps University of Marburg, completing her studies in 1976 with the first state examination for teaching at grammar schools. She then worked as a research assistant in the Department of Biology at the University of Marburg. In 1980, she received her doctorate (Dr. rer. nat.) with a dissertation entitled "Observations on the Developmental History of the Dinophyceae ceratium cornutum – Sexuality, Gamie, and Meiosis." After completing her teaching traineeship, she passed the second state examination in 1983. Following this, she worked as a freelance contributor for various publishing houses .

Christel Happach-Kasan has a daughter.

== Party ==
She has been a member of the FDP since 1970. She has chaired the FDP district association of Herzogtum Lauenburg since 1985. From 1989 to 2009, she was a member of the FDP Schleswig-Holstein state executive committee, serving as deputy state chair from 1999. She headed the FDP federal committee on food, agriculture, and consumer protection.

== Members of parliament ==
From 1990 to 1992, Christel Happach-Kasan was a member of the district council of the Duchy of Lauenburg. From 1992 until she resigned her mandate on 10 December 2002, she was a member of the Landtag of Schleswig-Holstein. There, she was deputy chairwoman of the FDP parliamentary group and spokesperson for agricultural and environmental policy.

On 10 December 2002, she succeeded Wolfgang Kubicki, who had resigned, in the Bundestag. Christel Happach-Kasan was the FDP parliamentary group's spokesperson for food and agriculture and chair of the FDP parliamentary group's working group on food, agriculture, and consumer protection. In her roles, she advocated for genetic engineering in crop production and the food chain, as well as for the increased cultivation and use of plants for bioenergy production.

Christel Happach-Kasan always entered the Bundestag via the second vote on the Schleswig-Holstein state list. Due to her party's failure to clear the five percent hurdle in the 2013 federal election, she was no longer represented in the 18th Bundestag.

== Memberships ==
Happach-Kasan was a member of the European Union Parliamentary Group of the German Bundestag and chairman of the German-Baltic Parliamentary Group.

== Voluntary engagement ==
She is chairwoman of the Förderkreis Kulturdenkmal Stecknitzfahrt e. V. (Association for the Preservation of the Stecknitz Canal Cultural Monument), chairwoman of the environmental committee of the Schleswig-Holsteinischer Heimatbund (SHHB) (Schleswig-Holstein Heritage Association), state chairwoman of the Schutzgemeinschaft Deutscher Wald (SDW) Schleswig-Holstein (German Forest Protection Association Schleswig-Holstein), a member of the SDW's federal executive board, and a member of the board of trustees of the Otto von Bismarck Foundation. Happach-Kasan was president of the German Angling Association (DAFV) from May 28, 2013, to August 28, 2021. The DAFV, headquartered in Berlin, was registered with the Charlottenburg District Court on June 19, 2013, following the merger of the German Sport Fishing Association and the German Anglers' Association.

== Awards ==
- Freie Elbfischerin
- Offizierskreuz des Verdienstordens der Republik Litauen
- 2013: Orden des Marienland-Kreuzes II. Klasse
- 2024: Bundesverdienstkreuz am Bande

== See also ==
- List of members of the 15th Bundestag
- List of members of the 16th Bundestag
- List of members of the 17th Bundestag
