= Ernst Behringer =

German politician (1942–2023)

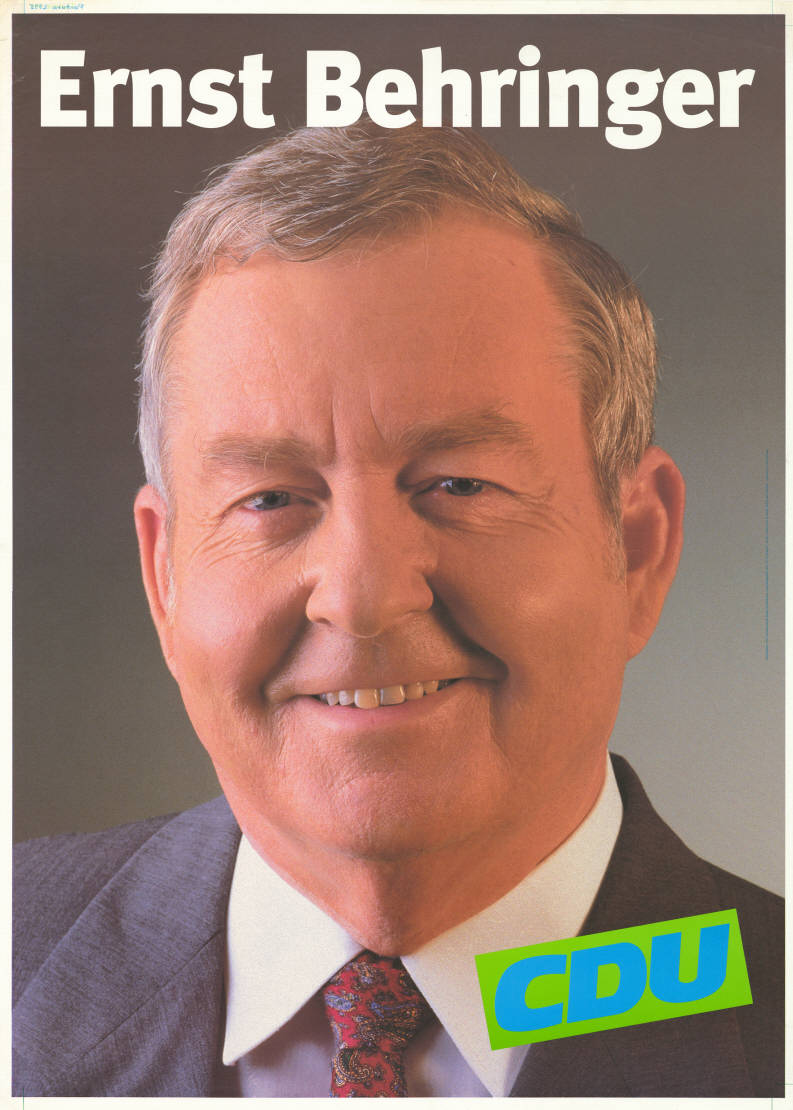
- 1996 Behringer campaign poster

Member of the Landtag of Baden-Württemberg
- In office 21 November 1994 – 27 March 2011
- Preceded by: Dietmar Schlee
- Succeeded by: Tanja Gönner
- Constituency: Landtagswahlkreis Sigmaringen

Personal details
- Born: 4 March 1942 Schönenberg, Gau Baden–Alsace, Germany
- Died: 11 March 2023 (aged 81)
- Party: CDU

Ernst Behringer (4 March 1942 – 11 March 2023) was a German politician. A member of the Christian Democratic Union, he served in the Landtag of Baden-Württemberg from 1994 to 2011.

Behringer died on 11 March 2023, at the age of 81.
