= Verena Butalikakis =

German politician (1955–2018)

Member of the German Bundestag for Berlin
- In office 2002–2005
- Constituency: Berlin-Neukölln

Personal details
- Born: Verena Maass; 26 March 1955 West Berlin, West Germany
- Died: 8 February 2018 (aged 62)
- Party: CDU

Verena Butalikakis (née Maass; 26 March 1955 – 8 February 2018) was a German politician from the Christian Democratic Union. She was a Member of the Bundestag after the 2002 federal election, standing unsuccessfully in Berlin-Neukölln.

== See also ==
- List of members of the 15th Bundestag
