= Tanja Gönner =

German politician

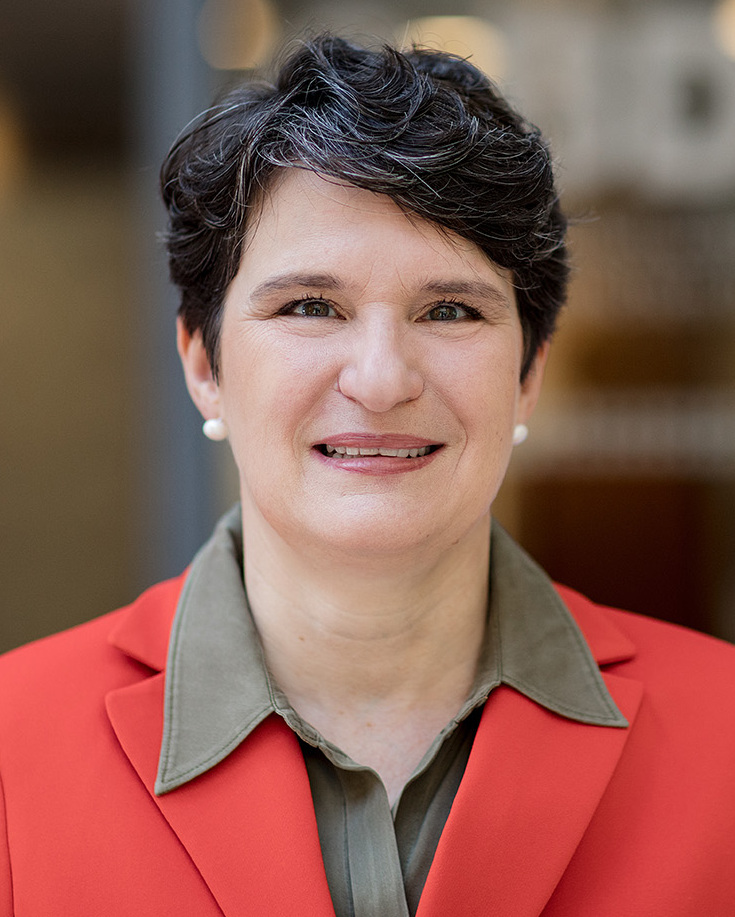
- Gönner in 2022

Minister for Transport of Baden-Württemberg
- In office 24 February 2010 – 12 May 2011
- Minister-President: Stefan Mappus
- Preceded by: Heribert Rech
- Succeeded by: Winfried Hermann

Minister for the Environment of Baden-Württemberg
- In office 29 April 2005 – 12 May 2011
- Minister-President: Günther Oettinger; Stefan Mappus
- Preceded by: Stefan Mappus
- Succeeded by: Franz Untersteller

Minister for Social Affairs of Baden-Württemberg
- In office 14 July 2004 – 29 April 2005
- Minister-President: Erwin Teufel
- Preceded by: Friedhelm Repnik
- Succeeded by: Andreas Renner

Member of the; Landtag of Baden-Württemberg; for Sigmaringen
- In office 1 May 2011 – 30 June 2012
- Preceded by: Ernst Behringer
- Succeeded by: Klaus Burger

Member of the Bundestag; for Zollernalb – Sigmaringen
- In office 17 October 2002 – 13 July 2004
- Preceded by: Egon Jüttner
- Succeeded by: Angela Schmid

Personal details
- Born: 23 July 1969 (age 57) Sigmaringen, West Germany
- Party: Christian Democratic Union
- Education: University of Tübingen

Tanja Gönner (born 23 July 1969) is a German lawyer and politician of the Christian Democratic Union (CDU) who has been serving as managing director of the Federation of German Industries (BDI), the leading lobby organization of German industry since November 2022.

As a CDU politician, she was a member of the German Bundestag from 2002 until her resignation on 13 July 2004, Minister of Social Affairs from 2004 to 2005 and Minister of the Environment from 2005 to 2011, as well as minister of transport for the state of Baden-Württemberg from 2010 to 2011. From 2012 to 2022, she was spokesperson of the board of the Deutsche Gesellschaft für Internationale Zusammenarbeit.

== Early life and education ==
Gönner has an older sister, a younger sister, and a younger brother. She is Catholic and single. Gönner grew up in Bingen near Sigmaringen, where she also attended primary school. After graduating from the Liebfrauenschule Sigmaringen in 1989, Gönner initially trained as a legal clerk, which she completed with a diploma in 1992. In 1993, she studied law at the University of Tübingen, which she completed in 1997 with the first state examination in law. After her legal clerkship and second state examination in 1999, she was admitted to the bar. After completing her studies, Gönner initially worked as an insolvency administrator.

== Political career ==
=== Career in national politics ===
Tanja Gönner joined the CDU in 1987. She initially became involved in the Junge Union, of which she was deputy national chairwoman from 1998 to 2002. From 2002 to 2004 Gönner served as member of the Bundestag, representing the Zollernalb – Sigmaringen district. From 2001 to 2013, she was Chairwoman of the Sigmaringen CDU district association and, from 2005, a member of the Baden-Württemberg CDU state executive. From 2006 to the end of 2007, Tanja Gönner was a member of the CDU Basic Programme Commission. In 2007, she became deputy chairwoman of the Commission for the Integrity of Creation. From 2000 to 2012, Gönner was part of the federal executive of the CDU, under leadership of the party's chairwoman Angela Merkel.

After the 2011 state parliamentary elections, in which Minister President Stefan Mappus no longer achieved a majority, she was considered a promising candidate for the chairmanship of the Baden-Württemberg CDU; however, after Gönner, who was counted among the closest leadership circle around Mappus, failed in the election for the parliamentary group chairmanship in the state parliament against Peter Hauk, she withdrew her candidacy. The state CDU was then led by Thomas Strobl. Her attempt to succeed Andreas Schockenhoff as CDU district chair for the Württemberg-Hohenzollern district also failed. On 22 October 2011, member of the Bundestag Thomas Bareiß was elected to this position in a competitive vote.

=== Career in state government ===
She was a member of the German Bundestag from 2002 until her resignation on 13 July 2004: with 54.1% of the first votes, she was the directly elected member of the Bundestag for the Zollernalb – Sigmaringen constituency (constituency 295). After she was appointed minister, she initially did not hold a seat in the Baden-Württemberg state parliament but won the seat for the Sigmaringen state parliamentary constituency in the state parliament elections in March 2011. She resigned from the state parliament on 30 June 2012. She was replaced by Klaus Burger.

In 2004, Gönner was appointed State Minister for Social Affairs in the government of Minister-President Erwin Teufel of Baden-Württemberg. At the same time, she was appointed the state government's commissioner for the disabled. As a result, she was temporarily the youngest member of the Federal Council. In the subsequent governments of Ministers-President Günther Oettinger and Stefan Mappus, she served as State Minister of the Environment from 2005 to 2011. In this capacity, she notably defended the controversial Stuttgart 21 infrastructure project.

In the negotiations to form a coalition government following the 2009 federal elections, Gönner was part of the working group on the environment, agriculture and consumer protection, led by Ilse Aigner and Michael Kauch.

In 2011, news media reported that Gönner was the preferred candidate of Chancellor Angela Merkel to succeed Matthias Kurth as president of the Federal Network Agency for Electricity, Gas, Telecommunications, Posts and Railway (BNetzA); after negotiations, however, Jochen Homann was eventually appointed.

== Life after politics ==
From 2012 to 2022, Gönner served as chair of the board at GIZ.

Since June 2022, Gönner has been serving as managing director of the Federation of German Industries (BDI).

== Other activities ==
=== Government bodies ===
- German Council for Sustainable Development (RNE), Member (since 2023, appointed ad personam by Chancellor Olaf Scholz)

=== Corporate boards ===
- KfW, Member of the Board of Supervisory Directors (since 2023)
- VfB Stuttgart, Member of the supervisory board (since 2022)
- Fraport, Member of the Economic Advisory Board
- Stuttgart Airport, Chair of the supervisory board (2010–2011)

=== Non-profit organizations ===
- Energy and Climate Policy and Innovation Council (EPICO), Member of the advisory board (since 2021)
- World Vision Germany, Member of the board of trustees (since 2020)
- Stiftung Liebenau, Member of the supervisory board (since 2012)
- Agora Verkehrswende, Member of the council
- Baden-Badener Unternehmer-Gespräche (BBUG), Member of the executive board (since 2023)
- Bundesverband der Unternehmervereinigungen (BUV), Member of the advisory board
- Institut der deutschen Wirtschaft, Member of the Presidium
- Quadriga Hochschule Berlin, Member of the advisory board on Politics and Public Affairs
- Tönissteiner Group, Member of the board of trustees
- WLSB-Sportstiftung, Member of the board of trustees
- Konrad Adenauer Foundation (KAS), Member of the board of directors
- Federal Academy for Security Policy (BAKS), Member of the advisory board (2018–2021)

== Publications ==
- 2014: Zieht die größeren Schuhe an! Globale Zukunftsfragen und was Deutschland in der Welt erwartet. Murmann Verlag Hamburg, ISBN 978-3-86774-341-9
