= Karl Addicks =

German physician and politician

Karl Addicks (born 31 December 1950 in Amberg, Bavaria) is a German physician and politician of the Free Democratic Party (FDP). He served as a member of the Bundestag between 2004 and 2009.

== Early life ==
Addicks was born in Amberg in the administrative region of Oberpfalz, Bavaria on 31 December 1950. After obtaining his Abitur in 1969 he studied medicine, biology, and chemistry in Saarbrücken and Hamburg. He joined the FDP in 1989.

== Political career ==
Addicks was a member of the German Bundestag from 2004 until 2009. During that period, he served on the Committee on Economic Cooperation and Development. In addition to his committee assignments, Addicks was a member of the Berlin-Taipei Parliamentary Circle of Friends.

== Other activities ==
- CARE Deutschland-Luxemburg, Member of the Board of Trustees
- Association of European Parliamentarians with Africa (AWEPA), Member
- Amnesty International, Member
