= Oliver Luksic =

German politician

Oliver Luksic MdB
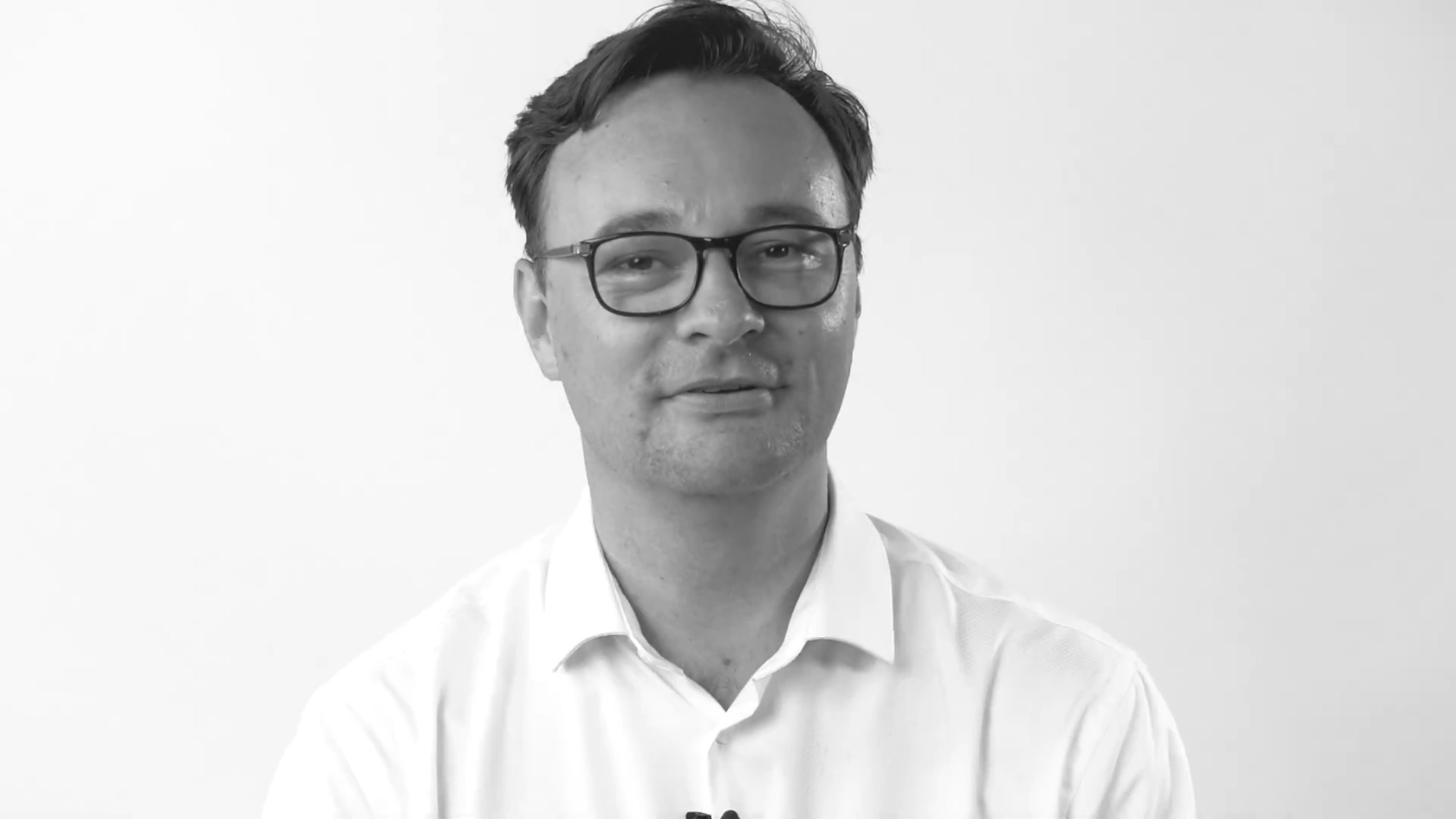

Leader of the Free Democratic Party in Saarland
- Incumbent
- Assumed office 8 January 2011
- Deputy: Helmut Isringhaus; Tobias Raab; Angelika Hießerich-Peter
- Preceded by: Christoph Hartmann

Member of the Bundestag for Saarland
- Incumbent
- Assumed office 24 October 2017
- Constituency: FDP List
- In office 27 October 2009 – 22 October 2013
- Constituency: FDP List

Personal details
- Born: 9 October 1979 (age 46)
- Party: Free Democratic Party
- Education: Sciences Po; King's College London

Oliver Luksic (born 9 October 1979) is a German politician of the Free Democratic Party (FDP) who has been a Member of the Bundestag for Saarland since the 2017 elections, after having previously served from 2009 until 2013.

In addition to his parliamentary work, Luksic served as Parliamentary State Secretary in the Federal Ministry of Transport and Digital Infrastructure in the coalition government of Chancellor Olaf Scholz from 2018 to 2021. In this capacity, he was the Federal Government’s Coordinator for Freight and Logistics.

== Early life and education ==
Luksic was educated at Sciences Po and King's College London.

== Political career ==
Luksic served as Member of the German Bundestag between the 2002 and the 2013 national elections. In this capacity, he was a member of the Committee on European Affairs and of the Committee on Transport, Building and Urban Development. In 2012, he succeeded Patrick Döring as the FDP parliamentary group's spokesperson on transport policy.

In addition to his committee assignments, Luksic served as chairman of the German Parliamentary Friendship Group with Belgium and Luxembourg.

Since 2011, Luksic has been the chairman of the FDP in Saarland. In this capacity, he led the party's campaigns for the Saarland state elections in 2012 and 2017, both times without winning any seats in the state parliament.

In 2014, Luksic took on a position with Merzig-based Kohlpharma, one of the leading importers of pharmaceuticals in Europe.

Lusksic was re-elected as Member of the German Parliament in the 2017 national elections. From 2018 until 2021, he served on the Committee on Transport, Building and Digital Infrastructure. In addition to his committee assignments, he chaired the Parliamentary Friendship Group for Relations with Croatia and Slovenia. From 2019, he was a member of the German delegation to the Franco-German Parliamentary Assembly.

In the negotiations to form a so-called traffic light coalition of the Social Democrats (SPD), the Green Party and the FDP following the 2021 federal elections, Luksic led his party's delegation in the working group on mobility; his co-chairs from the other parties were Anke Rehlinger and Anton Hofreiter.

== Other activities ==
=== Corporate boards ===
- Autobahn GmbH, Chair of the Supervisory Board (since 2022)

=== Non-profit organizations ===
- Baker Tilly Foundation, Member of the Advisory Board
- Belgian-German Society, President (2010–2013)
- European Movement Germany, Member of the Board (since 2009)

== Personal life ==
Luksic lives with his family in Heusweiler.
