= Paul Breuer =

German politician

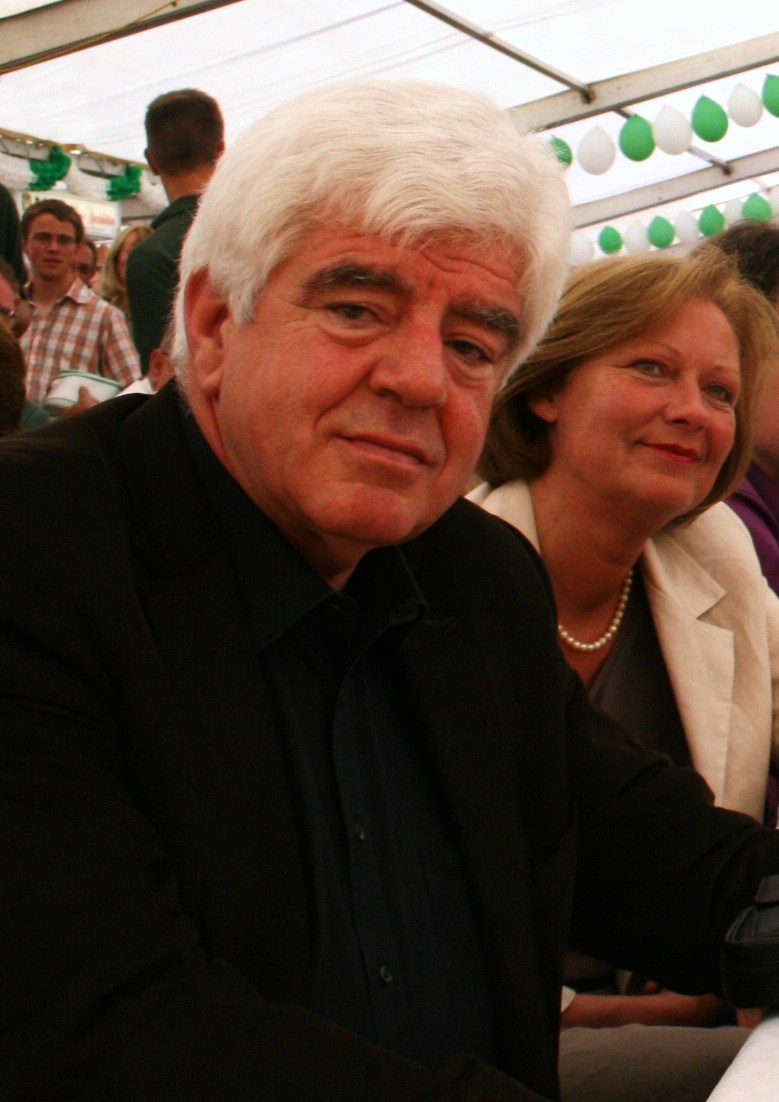
- Paul Breuer in 2010

Member of the Bundestag
- In office 4 November 1980 – 27 June 2003

Personal details
- Born: 25 June 1950 (age 75) Berghausen, Bad Berleburg, West Germany (now Germany)
- Party: CDU

Paul Breuer (born 25 June 1950) is a German politician. He represents the CDU. Breuer served as a member of the Bundestag from the state of North Rhine-Westphalia from 1980 to 2003.

== Life ==
In 1980 he was elected to the German Bundestag via the state list of the CDU North Rhine-Westphalia. In the elections from 1983 to 1994 he won the constituency of Siegen-Wittgenstein directly. In 1998 and 2002 he again entered the Bundestag via the state list. Breuer was spokesman for defense policy of the CDU/CSU faction from 1992 to 2003. From 2003 to 2014 he was District Administrator of the Siegen-Wittgenstein district.
