= Angelika Volquartz =

German politician

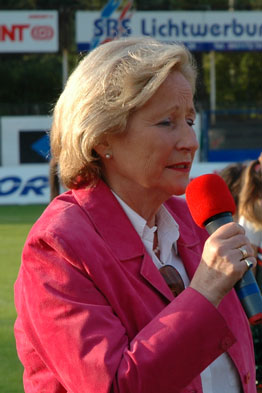
Angelika Volquartz

Angelika Volquartz (born 2 September 1946 in Uelzen, Lower Saxony) is a German politician. She was the mayor of Kiel from 2003 to 2009. She was the first Kiel's female mayor.
