= Dietrich Austermann =

German politician

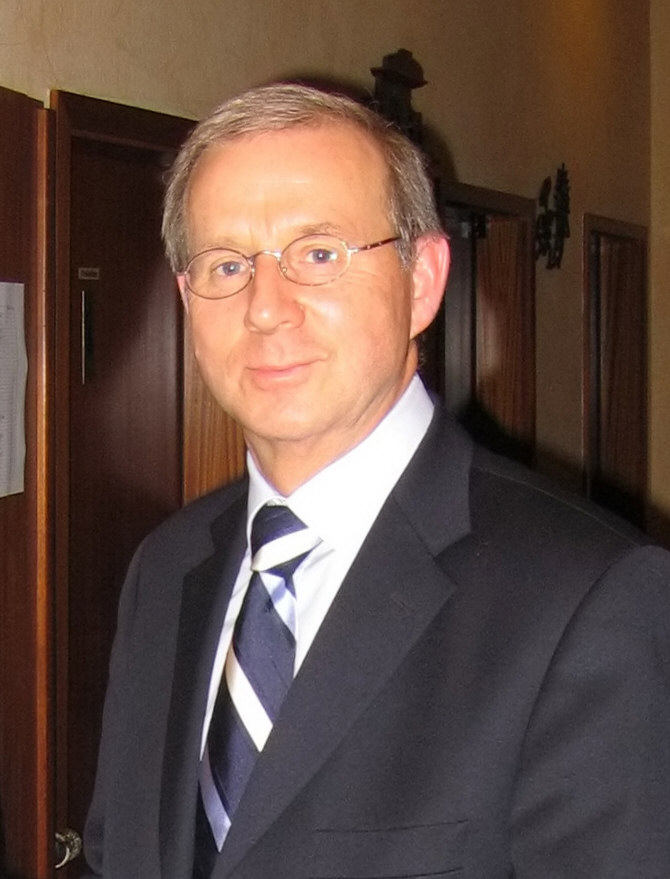
- Dietrich Austermann in 2007

Member of the Bundestag
- In office 16 April 1982 – 4 May 2005

Personal details
- Born: 22 October 1941 (age 84) Berlin, Germany
- Party: CDU Christian Democratic Union of Germany (CDU)

Dietrich Austermann (born 22 October 1941) is a German politician. He represents the CDU. Austermann was a member of the Bundestag from the state of Schleswig-Holstein from 1982 to 2005.

== Life ==
Austermann succeeded Olaf Baron von Wrangel, who left the Bundestag on April 16, 1982, and was subsequently a member of the German Bundestag until his resignation on May 4, 2005. From 27 April 2005 to 9 July 2008 he was Minister of Science, Economics and Transport in Schleswig-Holstein.
