= Michael Kauch =

German politician (born 1967)

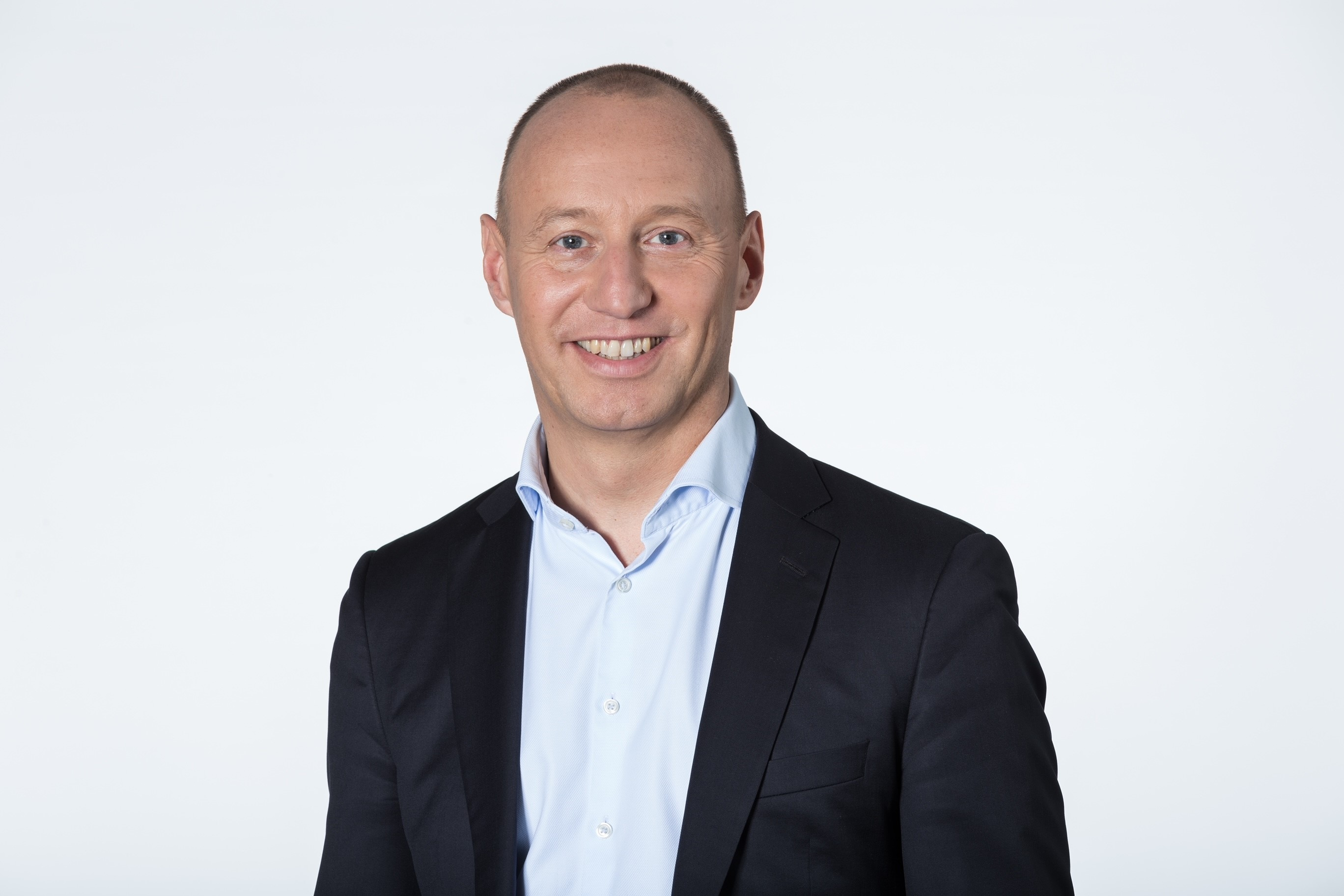

Member of the Bundestag
- In office 2003–2013

Personal details
- Born: 4 May 1967 (age 59) Dortmund
- Party: FDP
- Education: University of Dortmund

Michael Kauch (born 4 May 1967, in Dortmund) is a German politician of the Free Democratic Party who served as a Member of the European Parliament in 2024 and as a Member of the Bundestag between 2003 and 2013.

== Early life and education ==
Kauch was born in Dortmund and attended the Helmholtz-Gymnasium. He studied economics at the University of Dortmund from 1986 to 1993.

== Political career ==
Kauch became a member of the Free Democratic Party in Germany in 1989. From 1995 to 1999, he served as the chair of the Young Liberals (JuLis).

On 14 June 2003 Kauch became a member of the Bundestag, taking the seat of Jürgen Möllemann who had deceased shortly before. Throughout his time in parliament, he was as a member of the Committee on the Environment, Nature Conservation and Nuclear Safety and of the Parliamentary Advisory Board on Sustainable Development. He also served as his parliamentary group’s rapporteur on LGBT rights, organ transplantation and palliative care (2005-2009).

In the negotiations to form a coalition government of the FDP and the Christian Democrats (CDU together with the Bavarian CSU) following the 2009 federal elections, Kauch led the FDP delegation in the working group on environmental policy, agriculture and consumer protection; his counterpart of the CDU/CSU was Ilse Aigner.

In late 2018, Kauch announced that he would run for a parliamentary seat in the 2019 European elections; however, his place on the FDP list for the elections meant that he did not win a seat in parliament.

In the negotiations to form a coalition government between the SPD, the Green Party and FDP following the 2021 federal elections, Kauch was part of his party's delegation in the working group on equality, co-chaired by Petra Köpping, Ricarda Lang and Herbert Mertin.

In 2024, Kauch replaced Nicola Beer who resigned her seat in the European Parliament to move to the board of the European Investment Bank. In parliament, he served on the Committee on Industry, Research and Energy and deputy member of the Committees on Economic and Monetary Affairs (ECON) and Foreign Affairs (AFET). In addition, he was part of the parliament’s delegation for relations with Israel. The FDP delegation made him its spokesperson in the aforementioned committees as well as in the areas of law, culture and LGBTI issues. He was shadow rapporteur for a legislative proposal to facilitate consular protection for unrepresented EU citizens in third countries.

== Other activities ==
- GLOBE Europe, President
- Hirschfeld Eddy Foundation, Member of the Board of Trustees
- Initiative Queer Nations (IQN), Member
- Magnus Hirschfeld Foundation, Member of the Board of Trustees

== Personal life ==
Kauch is openly gay.
