= Christoph Hartmann (politician) =

German politician (born 1972)

Christoph Hartmann MdL a. D. Landesminister a. D. MdBR a. D.
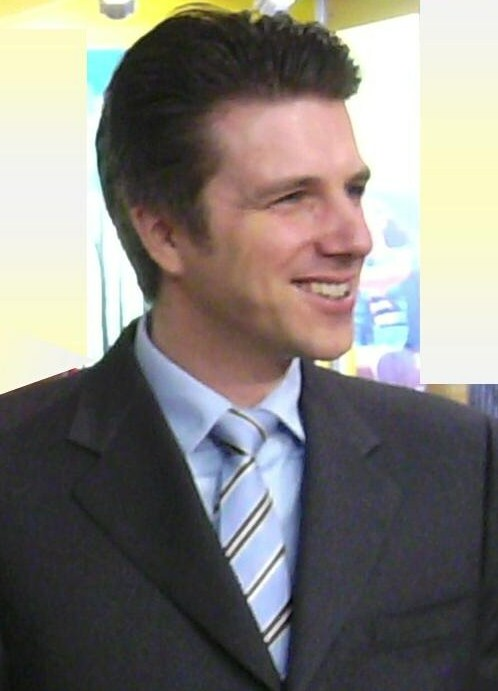

Deputy Minister-President of Saarland
- In office 10 November 2009 – 18 January 2012
- Minister-President: Peter Müller; Annegret Kramp-Karrenbauer
- Preceded by: Peter Jacoby
- Succeeded by: Peter Jacoby (Acting)

Minister of Economy and Science of Saarland
- In office 10 November 2009 – 18 January 2012
- Minister-President: Peter Müller; Annegret Kramp-Karrenbauer
- Preceded by: Joachim Rippel
- Succeeded by: Peter Jacoby (Acting)

Leader of the Free Democratic Party in Saarland
- In office 2002 – 9 November 2010
- Preceded by: Karl-Josef Jochem
- Succeeded by: Oliver Luksic

Member of the Landtag of Saarland
- In office 6 October 2004 – 24 April 2012
- Constituency: FDP List

Member of the Bundestag for Saarland
- In office 17 October 2002 – 1 November 2004
- Preceded by: Uta Würfel (1994)
- Succeeded by: Karl Addicks
- Constituency: FDP List

Personal details
- Born: 21 May 1972 (age 54) Essen, Germany
- Party: FDP

Christoph Georg Hartmann (born 21 May 1972) is a German politician who is a member of the Free Democratic Party (FDP). From November 2009 until January 2012, he was the secretary to the Minister-president of Saarland and the Saarland Minister for Economy and Science.

== Education and profession ==
After leaving school in 1991 he completed his military service, and then trained as a Bank Manager. He studied Business Administration in Vienna, Munich and Saarbrücken, gaining his diploma in 2000. 2006 he gained his PhD in Information Science from Saarland University.

== Political career ==
In 1992 Hartmann joined the FDP. Initially he was involved in the Young Liberals, of which he was regional chair from 1997 to 1999. Between 1996 until 2005 he was the Chairman of the Homburg local party of the FDP. After serving as General Secretary of the Saarland FDP from 1998 to 2002, he was elected Chairman of the regional party. On 9 November 2010 he resigned this position. From 1999 he has served on the FDP national board.

=== Elected positions ===
From 2002 until his resignation on 1 November 2004, Hartmann was a member of the German National Parliament (Bundestag). Here he was at this time educational policy spokesman of the FDP parliamentary group. He was the Saarland FDP representative in the Bundestag for eight years.

Hartmann resigned his seat in the national parliament, since he had been elected to the Regional Parliament of Saarland in 2004 where he served as chairman of the FDP parliamentary group.

From 10 November 2009 to 18 January 2012 he was Minister of Economics and Science of Saarland and Deputy Prime Minister in the first Jamaica coalition at state level.

== Personal life ==
Hartmann is married with two children and lives in Dudweiler.
