= Results of the 2009 German federal election =

2009 German federal election
- 27 September 2009
- All 622 seats in the Bundestag; 312 seats needed for a majority
- Turnout: 70.8% ▼6.9pp
Party	Leader	Vote %	Seats	+/–
CDU/CSU	Angela Merkel	33.8%	239	+13
SPD	Frank-Walter Steinmeier	23.0%	146	−76
FDP	Guido Westerwelle	14.6%	93	+32
Left	G. Gysi/O. Lafontaine	11.9%	76	+22
Greens	J. Trittin/R. Künast	10.7%	68	+17
This lists parties that won seats. See the complete results below.
Results for the single-member constituencies
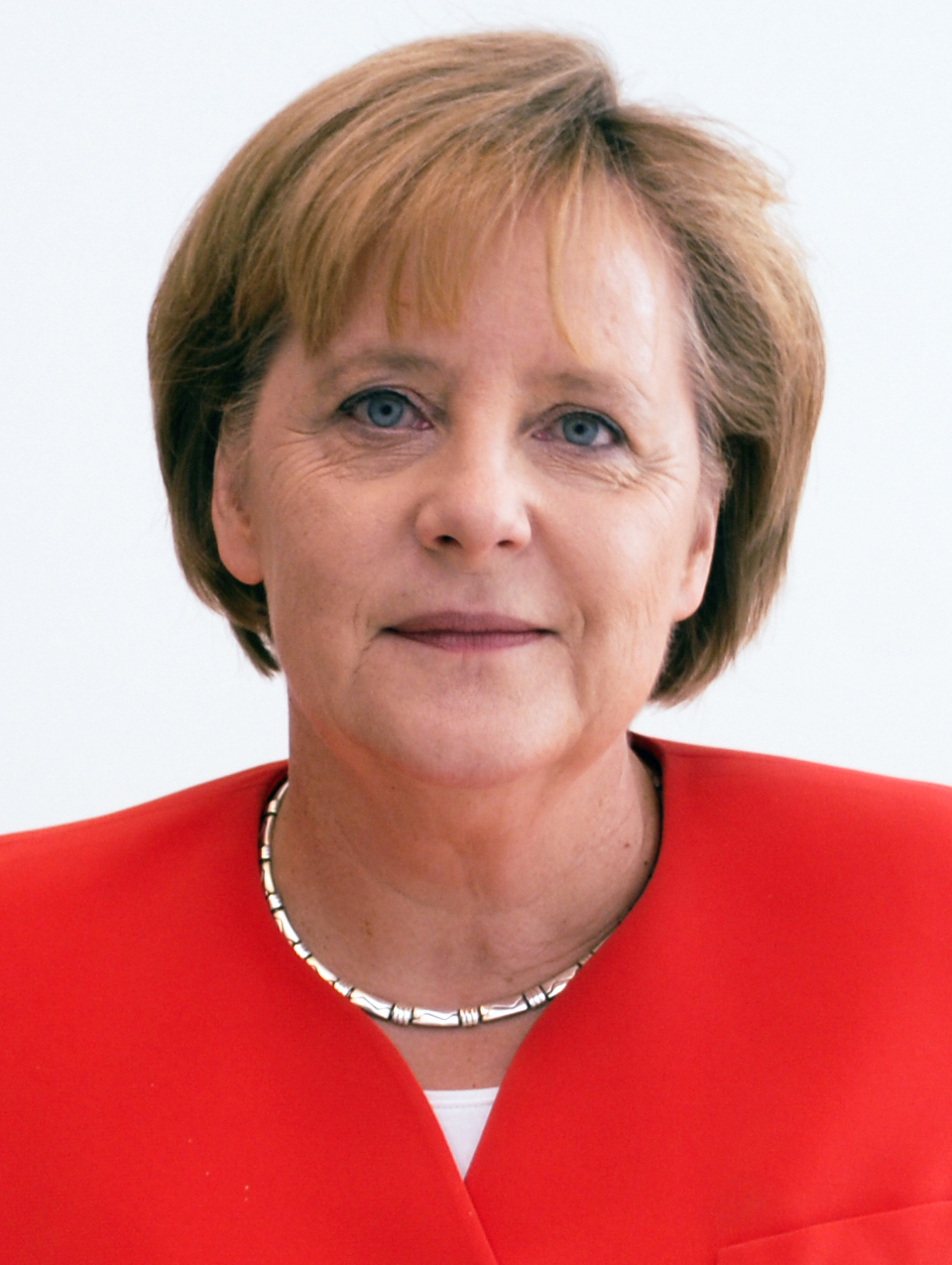

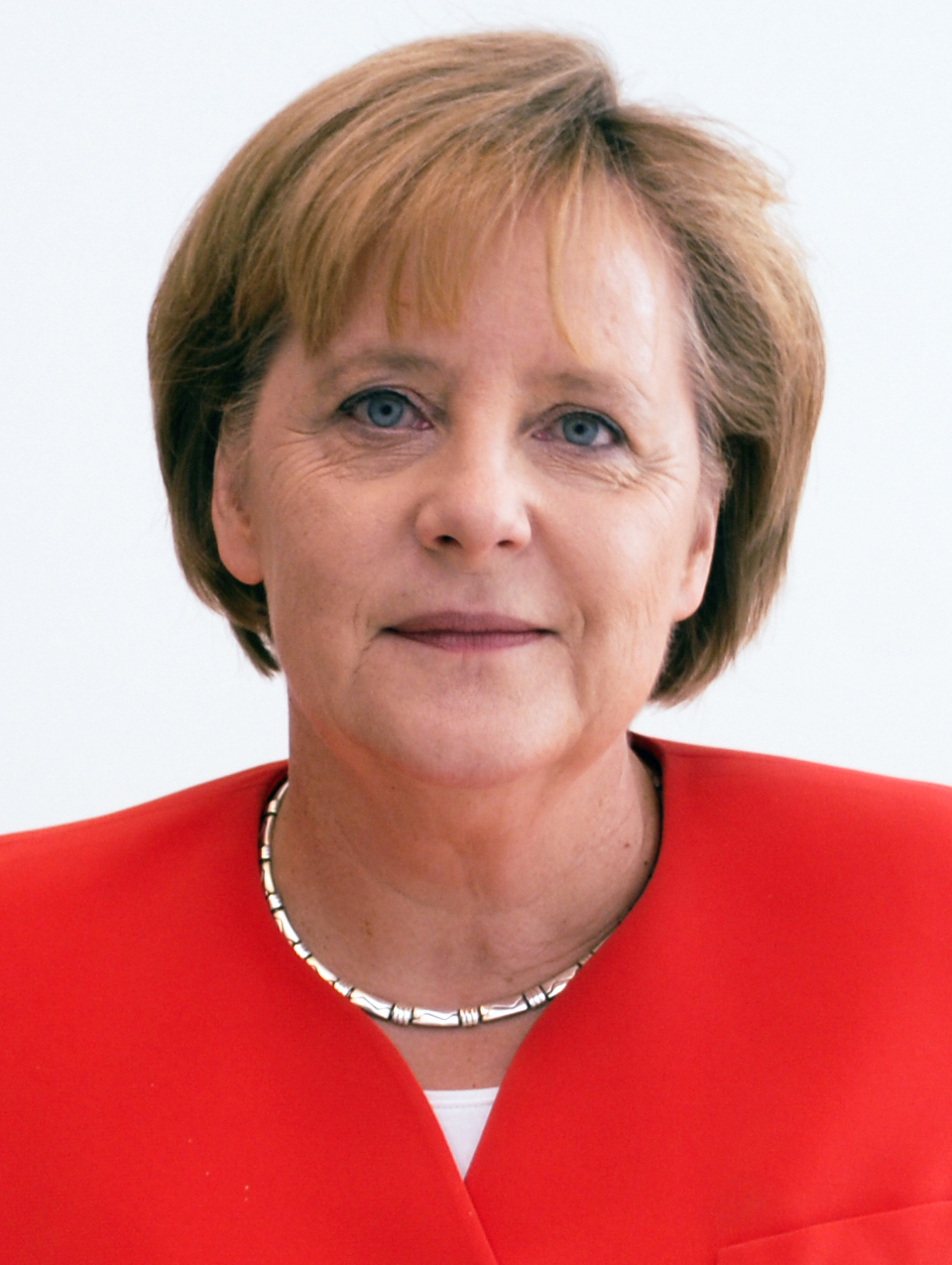
Chancellor before	Chancellor after
Angela Merkel; CDU/CSU	Angela Merkel; CDU/CSU

This is a breakdown of the results of the 2009 German federal election. The following tables display detailed results in each of the sixteen states and all 299 single-member constituencies.

== Electoral system ==
According to Article 38 of the Basic Law for the Federal Republic of Germany, members of the Bundestag shall be elected in general, direct, free, equal and secret elections; everyone over the age of eighteen is entitled to vote.

In 2008, some modifications to the electoral system were required under an order of the Federal Constitutional Court. The court had found a provision in the Federal Election Law by which it was possible for a party to experience a negative vote weight, thus losing seats due to more votes, violated the constitutional guarantee of the electoral system being equal and direct. The court allowed three years for these changes, so the 2009 federal election was not affected.

The Bundestag is elected using mixed-member proportional representation. Each voter has two votes, a first vote for the election of a constituency candidate (by method of first-past-the-post), and a second vote for the election of a state list. The Sainte-Laguë/Schepers method is used to convert the votes into seats, in a two-stage process with each stage involving two calculations. First, the number of seats to be allocated to each state is calculated, based on the proportion of the German population living there. Then the seats in each state are allocated to the party lists in that state, based on the proportion of second votes each party received.

In the distribution of seats among state lists, only parties that have obtained at least five percent of the valid second votes cast in the electoral area or have won a seat in at least three constituencies are taken into consideration.

Additional "overhang seats" are created to ensure that no party receives fewer than its guaranteed minimum number of seats. This has the side-effect of inflating the size of the Bundestag if a party wins more direct mandates than its vote share entitles it to. Once the number of seats which each party is entitled to receive across the country has been determined, the seats are allocated to the parties' individual state lists.

== Nationwide ==
Party	Constituency			Party list			Total seats	+/–
Party	Votes	%	Seats	Votes	%	Seats	Total seats	+/–
Christian Democratic Union (CDU) (Note: The Christian Democratic Union and the Christian Social Union of Bavaria call themselves sister parties. They do not compete against each other in the same states and they form one group within the Bundestag.)	13,856,674	32.0	173	11,828,277	27.3	21	194	+14
Social Democratic Party (SPD)	12,079,758	27.9	64	9,990,488	23.0	82	146	−76
Free Democratic Party (FDP)	4,076,496	9.4	0	6,316,080	14.6	93	93	+32
The Left (DIE LINKE)	4,791,124	11.1	16	5,155,933	11.9	60	76	+22
Alliance 90/The Greens (GRÜNE)	3,977,125	9.2	1	4,643,272	10.7	67	68	+17
Christian Social Union in Bavaria (CSU)	3,191,000	7.4	45	2,830,238	6.5	0	45	−1
Pirate Party Germany (PIRATEN)	46,770	0.1	0	847,870	2.0	0	0	New
National Democratic Party (NPD)	768,442	1.8	0	635,525	1.5	0	0	0
Human Environment Animal Protection Party	16,887	0.0	0	230,872	0.5	0	0	0
The Republicans (REP)	30,061	0.1	0	193,396	0.4	0	0	0
Ecological Democratic Party (ödp)	105,653	0.2	0	132,249	0.3	0	0	0
Family Party (FAMILIE)	17,848	0.0	0	120,718	0.3	0	0	0
Alliance 21/RRP	37,946	0.1	0	100,605	0.2	0	0	New
Pensioners' Party (RENTNER)	–	–	–	56,399	0.1	0	0	New
Bavaria Party (BP)	32,324	0.1	0	48,311	0.1	0	0	0
German People's Union (DVU)	–	–	–	45,752	0.1	0	0	0
Party of Bible-abiding Christians (PBC)	12,052	0.0	0	40,370	0.1	0	0	0
Civil Rights Movement Solidarity (BüSo)	34,894	0.1	0	38,706	0.1	0	0	0
The Violets (DIE VIOLETTEN)	5,794	0.0	0	31,957	0.1	0	0	0
Marxist–Leninist Party (MLPD)	17,512	0.0	0	29,261	0.1	0	0	0
Alliance for Germany (Volksabstimmung)	2,550	0.0	0	23,015	0.1	0	0	0
Free Voters (FWD)	–	–	–	11,243	0.0	0	0	New
Christian Centre (CM)	–	–	–	6,826	0.0	0	0	0
Centre Party (ZENTRUM)	369	0.0	0	6,087	0.0	0	0	0
Party for Social Equality (PSG)	–	–	–	2,957	0.0	0	0	0
Alliance of the Centre (ADM)	396	0.0	0	2,889	0.0	0	0	New
German Communist Party (DKP)	929	0.0	0	1,894	0.0	0	0	0
Free Union (Freie Union)	6,121	0.0	0	–	–	–	0	New
Independents and voter groups	139,275	0.3	0	–	–	–	0	0
Valid votes	43,248,000	98.3	–	43,371,190	98.6	–	–	–
Invalid/blank votes	757,575	1.7	–	634,385	1.4	–	–	–
Total votes	44,005,575	100.0	299	44,005,575	100.0	323	622	+8
Registered voters/turnout	62,168,489	70.8	–	62,168,489	70.8	–	–	–
Source: Bundeswahlleiter

Popular vote
CDU/CSU	33.80%
SPD	23.03%
FDP	14.56%
DIE LINKE	11.89%
GRÜNE	10.71%
PIRATEN	1.95%
Other	4.06%

Bundestag seats
CDU/CSU	38.42%
SPD	23.47%
FDP	14.95%
DIE LINKE	12.22%
GRÜNE	10.93%

== Leaders' races ==
Party	Name	Constituency	Votes	%	Position	Elected?
CDU/CSU	Angela Merkel	Stralsund – Nordvorpommern – Rügen	57,865	49.3	1st	Elected
SPD	Frank-Walter Steinmeier	Brandenburg an der Havel	40,957	32.9	1st	Elected
FDP	Guido Westerwelle	Bonn	31,606	19.1	3rd	Elected on list
LINKE	Gregor Gysi	Berlin-Treptow-Köpenick	62,880	44.8	1st	Elected
LINKE	Oskar Lafontaine	Saarland party list			1st	Elected on list
GRÜNE	Jürgen Trittin	Göttingen	21,360	13.0	3rd	Elected on list
GRÜNE	Renate Künast	Berlin-Tempelhof-Schöneberg	44,506	26.3	2nd	Elected on list

== By state ==
=== Summary ===
Winning party by constituency.

Results of the party list vote by state.

Party list vote share by state
State	Union	SPD	FDP	Linke	Grüne	Others
Schleswig-Holstein	32.2	26.8	16.3	7.9	12.7	4.1
Mecklenburg-Vorpommern	33.1	16.6	9.8	29.0	5.5	6.0
Hamburg	27.8	27.4	13.2	11.2	15.6	4.8
Lower Saxony	33.2	29.3	13.3	8.6	10.7	4.9
Bremen	23.9	30.2	10.6	14.3	15.4	5.6
Brandenburg	23.6	25.1	9.3	28.5	6.1	7.4
Saxony-Anhalt	30.1	16.9	10.3	32.4	5.1	5.2
Berlin	22.8	20.2	11.5	20.2	17.4	7.9
North Rhine-Westphalia	33.1	28.5	14.9	8.4	10.1	5.0
Saxony	35.6	14.6	13.3	24.5	6.7	5.3
Hesse	32.2	25.6	16.6	8.5	12.0	5.1
Thuringia	31.2	17.6	9.8	28.8	6.0	6.6
Rhineland-Palatinate	35.0	23.8	16.6	9.4	9.7	5.5
Bavaria	42.5	16.8	14.7	6.5	10.8	8.7
Baden-Württemberg	34.4	19.3	18.8	7.2	13.9	6.4
Saarland	30.7	24.7	11.9	21.2	6.8	4.7

Seats by state
State	Distribution	Total
Schleswig-Holstein	2 / 6 / 3 / 4 / 9	24
Mecklenburg-Vorpommern	4 / 2 / 1 / 1 / 6	14
Hamburg	1 / 4 / 2 / 2 / 4	13
Lower Saxony	6 / 19 / 7 / 9 / 21	62
Bremen	1 / 2 / 1 / 1 / 1	6
Brandenburg	6 / 5 / 1 / 2 / 5	19
Saxony-Anhalt	6 / 3 / 1 / 2 / 5	17
Berlin	5 / 5 / 4 / 3 / 6	23
North Rhine-Westphalia	11 / 39 / 14 / 20 / 45	129
Saxony	8 / 5 / 2 / 4 / 16	35
Hesse	4 / 12 / 6 / 8 / 15	45
Thuringia	5 / 3 / 1 / 2 / 7	18
Rhineland-Palatinate	3 / 8 / 3 / 5 / 13	32
Bavaria	6 / 16 / 10 / 14 / 45	91
Baden-Württemberg	6 / 15 / 11 / 15 / 37	84
Saarland	2 / 2 / 1 / 1 / 4	10
Germany	76 / 146 / 68 / 93 / 239	622

=== Schleswig-Holstein ===
Party	Constituency			Party list			Total seats	+/–
Party	Votes	%	Seats	Votes	%	Seats	Total seats	+/–
Christian Democratic Union (CDU)	615,798	38.4	9	518,457	32.2	0	9	+1
Social Democratic Party (SPD)	519,995	32.4	2	430,739	26.8	4	6	−3
Free Democratic Party (FDP)	170,070	10.6	0	261,767	16.3	4	4	+2
Alliance 90/The Greens (GRÜNE)	161,626	10.1	0	203,782	12.7	3	3	+1
The Left (DIE LINKE)	113,319	7.1	0	127,203	7.9	2	2	+1
Pirate Party Germany	–	–	–	33,277	2.1	0	0	New
Pensioners' Party	–	–	–	16,006	1.0	0	0	New
National Democratic Party	17,139	1.1	0	15,848	1.0	0	0	0
German People's Union	–	–	–	1,807	0.1	0	0	New
Marxist–Leninist Party	–	–	–	616	0.0	0	0	0
The Violets	553	0.0	0	–	–	–	0	New
Centre Party	369	0.0	0	–	–	–	0	0
Others & Independents	6,021	0.4	0	–	–	–	0	–
Invalid/blank votes	39,494	–	–	34,882	–	–	–	–
Total	1,644,384	100	11	1,644,384	100	13	24	+2
Registered voters/turnout	2,234,720	73.6	–	2,234,720	73.6	–	–	–
Source: Federal Returning Officer

Constituency members
#	Constituency	Previous member	Elected member	Party	Votes	%	Margin	Runner-up
1	Flensburg – Schleswig	Wolfgang Wodarg	Wolfgang Börnsen	CDU	61,793	38.8	9,654	Wolfgang Wodarg
2	Nordfriesland – Dithmarschen Nord	Ingbert Liebing	Ingbert Liebing	CDU	56,751	43.2	20,109	Hanno Fecke
3	Steinburg – Dithmarschen Süd	Rolf Koschorrek	Rolf Koschorrek	CDU	49,779	39.8	12,502	Jörn Thießen
4	Rendsburg-Eckernförde	Otto Bernhardt	Johann Wadephul	CDU	58,876	40.2	11,266	Sönke Rix
5	Kiel	Hans-Peter Bartels	Hans-Peter Bartels	SPD	54,398	38.3	11,665	Michaela Pries
6	Plön – Neumünster	Michael Bürsch	Philipp Murmann	CDU	48,136	38.6	6,453	Birgit Malecha-Nissen
7	Pinneberg	Ole Schröder	Ole Schröder	CDU	70,458	40.8	15,508	Ernst Dieter Rossmann
8	Segeberg – Stormarn-Nord	Gero Storjohann	Gero Storjohann	CDU	70,290	39.8	16,225	Franz Thönnes
9	Ostholstein	Bettina Hagedorn	Ingo Gädechens	CDU	49,363	38.6	5,598	Bettina Hagedorn
10	Herzogtum Lauenburg – Stormarn-Süd	Carl-Eduard von Bismarck	Norbert Brackmann	CDU	70,874	39.9	17,801	Gesa Tralau
11	Lübeck	Gabriele Hiller-Ohm	Gabriele Hiller-Ohm	SPD	44,393	36.7	7,648	Anke Eymer

List members
SPD	FDP	GRÜNE	LINKE
Bettina Hagedorn; Sönke Rix; Ernst Dieter Rossmann; Franz Thönnes	Christine Aschenberg-Dugnus; Sebastian Blumenthal; Christel Happach-Kasan; Jürgen Koppelin	Ingrid Nestle; Konstantin von Notz; Arfst Wagner	Cornelia Möhring; Raju Sharma

=== Mecklenburg-Vorpommern ===
Party	Constituency			Party list			Total seats	+/–
Party	Votes	%	Seats	Votes	%	Seats	Total seats	+/–
Christian Democratic Union (CDU)	301,823	34.9	6	287,481	33.1	0	6	+2
The Left (DIE LINKE)	255,411	29.5	1	251,536	29.0	3	4	+1
Social Democratic Party (SPD)	161,414	18.6	0	143,607	16.6	2	2	−2
Free Democratic Party (FDP)	61,469	7.1	0	85,203	9.8	1	1	0
Alliance 90/The Greens (GRÜNE)	46,826	5.4	0	47,841	5.5	1	1	0
National Democratic Party	29,801	3.4	0	28,223	3.3	0	0	0
Pirate Party Germany	–	–	–	20,063	2.3	0	0	New
Marxist–Leninist Party	554	0.1	0	1,730	0.2	0	0	0
The Republicans	–	–	–	1,583	0.2	0	0	0
Ecological Democratic Party	523	0.1	0	–	–	–	0	New
Others & Independents	7,888	0.9	0	–	–	–	0	–
Invalid/blank votes	16,467	–	–	14,909	–	–	–	–
Total	882,176	100	7	882,176	100	7	14	+1
Registered voters/turnout	1,400,298	63.0	–	1,400,298	63.0	–	–	–
Source: Federal Returning Officer

Constituency members
#	Constituency	Previous member	Elected member	Party	Votes	%	Margin	Runner-up
12	Wismar – Nordwestmecklenburg – Parchim	Iris Hoffmann	Karin Strenz	CDU	45,383	33.7	4,964	Martina Bunge
13	Schwerin – Ludwigslust	Hans-Joachim Hacker	Dietrich Monstadt	CDU	34,633	29.3	952	Dietmar Bartsch
14	Rostock	Christian Kleiminger	Steffen Bockhahn	LINKE	41,539	32.3	7,022	Peter Stein
15	Stralsund – Nordvorpommern – Rügen	Angela Merkel	Angela Merkel	CDU	57,865	49.3	26,930	Marianne Linke
16	Greifswald – Demmin – Ostvorpommern	Ulrich Adam	Ulrich Adam	CDU	46,202	38.0	10,777	Peter Ritter
17	Bad Doberan – Güstrow – Müritz	Dirk Manzewski	Eckhardt Rehberg	CDU	45,176	34.7	9,575	Heidrun Bluhm
18	Neubrandenburg – Mecklenburg-Strelitz – Uecker-Randow	Susanne Jaffke-Witt	Christoph Poland	CDU	38,102	33.0	251	Torsten Koplin

List members
LINKE	SPD	FDP	GRÜNE
Dietmar Bartsch; Heidrun Bluhm; Martina Bunge	Hans-Joachim Hacker; Sonja Steffen	Christian Ahrendt	Harald Terpe

=== Hamburg ===
Party	Constituency			Party list			Total seats	+/–
Party	Votes	%	Seats	Votes	%	Seats	Total seats	+/–
Christian Democratic Union (CDU)	288,404	32.6	3	246,667	27.8	1	4	0
Social Democratic Party (SPD)	296,589	33.6	3	242,942	27.4	1	4	−2
Alliance 90/The Greens (GRÜNE)	128,440	14.5	0	138,454	15.6	2	2	0
Free Democratic Party (FDP)	69,968	7.9	0	117,143	13.2	2	2	+1
The Left (DIE LINKE)	86,119	9.7	0	99,096	11.2	1	1	0
Pirate Party Germany	–	–	–	23,168	2.6	0	0	New
National Democratic Party	9,181	1.0	0	7,679	0.9	0	0	0
Pensioners' Party	–	–	–	6,572	0.7	0	0	New
Ecological Democratic Party	1,899	0.2	0	2,988	0.3	0	0	New
German People's Union	–	–	–	1,184	0.1	0	0	New
Marxist–Leninist Party	158	0.0	0	445	0.1	0	0	0
Civil Rights Movement Solidarity	651	0.1	0	–	–	–	0	0
Others & Independents	2,249	0.3	0	–	–	–	0	–
Invalid/blank votes	12,395	–	–	9,715	–	–	–	–
Total	896,053	100	6	896,053	100	7	13	−1
Registered voters/turnout	1,256,634	71.3	–	1,256,634	71.3	–	–	–
Source: Federal Returning Officer

Constituency members
#	Constituency	Previous member	Elected member	Party	Votes	%	Margin	Runner-up
19	Hamburg-Mitte	Johannes Kahrs	Johannes Kahrs	SPD	56,809	34.5	13,222	David Erkalp
20	Hamburg-Altona	Olaf Scholz	Olaf Scholz	SPD	46,522	36.0	7,553	Marcus Weinberg
21	Hamburg-Eimsbüttel	Niels Annen	Rüdiger Kruse	CDU	43,714	31.2	7,196	Krista Sager
22	Hamburg-Nord	Christian Carstensen	Dirk Fischer	CDU	61,873	34.3	8,404	Christian Carstensen
23	Hamburg-Wandsbek	Ortwin Runde	Jürgen Klimke	CDU	53,958	36.5	2,498	Ingo Egloff
24	Hamburg-Bergedorf – Harburg	Hans-Ulrich Klose	Hans-Ulrich Klose	SPD	54,965	39.0	8,662	Wolfgang Müller-Kallweit

List members
GRÜNE	FDP	CDU
Krista Sager; Manuel Sarrazin	Sylvia Canel; Burkhardt Müller-Sönksen	Marcus Weinberg
SPD	LINKE	
Aydan Özoğuz	Jan van Aken	

=== Lower Saxony ===
Party	Constituency			Party list			Total seats	+/–
Party	Votes	%	Seats	Votes	%	Seats	Total seats	+/–
Christian Democratic Union (CDU)	1,703,363	38.5	16	1,471,530	33.2	5	21	0
Social Democratic Party (SPD)	1,581,443	35.8	14	1,297,940	29.3	5	19	−8
Free Democratic Party (FDP)	350,420	7.9	0	588,401	13.3	9	9	+3
Alliance 90/The Greens (GRÜNE)	370,188	8.4	0	475,742	10.7	7	7	+2
The Left (DIE LINKE)	331,141	7.5	0	380,373	8.6	6	6	+3
Pirate Party Germany	4,214	0.1	0	87,046	2.0	0	0	New
National Democratic Party	60,811	1.4	0	53,909	1.2	0	0	0
Human Environment Animal Protection Party	–	–	–	34,658	0.8	0	0	0
Alliance 21/RRP	14,204	0.3	0	31,977	0.7	0	0	New
Ecological Democratic Party	–	–	–	5,364	0.1	0	0	New
German People's Union	–	–	–	4,318	0.1	0	0	New
Marxist–Leninist Party	294	0.0	0	1,353	0.0	0	0	0
Party of Bible-abiding Christians	1,253	0.0	0	–	–	–	0	0
Civil Rights Movement Solidarity	307	0.0	0	–	–	–	0	0
Others & Independents	5,265	0.1	0	–	–	–	0	–
Invalid/blank votes	59,446	–	–	49,738	–	–	–	–
Total	4,482,349	100	30	4,482,349	100	32	62	0
Registered voters/turnout	6,112,110	73.3	–	6,112,110	73.3	–	–	–
Source: Federal Returning Officer

Constituency members
#	Constituency	Previous member	Elected member	Party	Votes	%	Margin	Runner-up
25	Aurich – Emden	Garrelt Duin	Garrelt Duin	SPD	57,876	44.4	24,170	Reinhard Hegewald
26	Unterems	Gitta Connemann	Gitta Connemann	CDU	73,405	45.2	25,924	Keno Borde
27	Friesland – Wilhelmshaven – Wittmund	Karin Evers-Meyer	Karin Evers-Meyer	SPD	51,851	39.9	9,640	Hans-Werner Kammer
28	Oldenburg – Ammerland	Gesine Multhaupt	Thomas Kossendey	CDU	55,610	35.5	6,590	Gesine Multhaupt
29	Delmenhorst – Wesermarsch – Oldenburg-Land	Holger Ortel	Astrid Grotelüschen	CDU	56,273	35.3	899	Holger Ortel
30	Cuxhaven – Stade II	New seat	Enak Ferlemann	CDU	51,654	38.6	1,173	Thurid Küber
31	Stade I – Rotenburg II	New seat	Martina Krogmann	CDU	62,035	44.2	15,184	Margrit Wetzel
32	Mittelems	Hermann Kues	Hermann Kues	CDU	91,378	54.6	47,875	Dieter Steinecke
33	Cloppenburg – Vechta	Franz-Josef Holzenkamp	Franz-Josef Holzenkamp	CDU	91,686	62.3	63,633	Gabriele Groneberg
34	Diepholz – Nienburg I	Rolf Kramer	Axel Knoerig	CDU	52,599	37.5	4,286	Rolf Kramer
35	Osterholz – Verden	New seat	Andreas Mattfeldt	CDU	53,070	37.1	683	Joachim Stünker
36	Rotenburg I – Heidekreis	New seat	Reinhard Grindel	CDU	48,344	40.2	5,949	Lars Klingbeil
37	Harburg	New seat	Michael Grosse-Brömer	CDU	59,657	40.6	14,655	Monika Griefahn
38	Lüchow-Dannenberg – Lüneburg	Hedi Wegener	Eckhard Pols	CDU	43,229	33.3	2,818	Hiltrud Lotze
39	Osnabrück-Land	Georg Schirmbeck	Georg Schirmbeck	CDU	63,175	44.2	17,147	Rainer Spiering
40	Stadt Osnabrück	Martin Schwanholz	Mathias Middelberg	CDU	54,522	38.4	7,543	Martin Schwanholz
41	Nienburg II – Schaumburg	Sebastian Edathy	Sebastian Edathy	SPD	58,639	41.4	5,935	Christopher Wuttke
42	Stadt Hannover I	Gerd Andres	Kerstin Tack	SPD	50,592	39.0	7,971	Rita Pawelski
43	Stadt Hannover II	Edelgard Bulmahn	Edelgard Bulmahn	SPD	55,068	39.6	10,534	Ursula von der Leyen
44	Hannover-Land I	Caren Marks	Caren Marks	SPD	67,178	38.7	867	Sebastian Lechner
45	Celle – Uelzen	Peter Struck	Henning Otte	CDU	68,572	44.2	18,465	Kirsten Lühmann
46	Gifhorn – Peine	Hubertus Heil	Hubertus Heil	SPD	64,365	40.5	5,538	Ewa Klamt
47	Hameln-Pyrmont – Holzminden	Gabriele Lösekrug-Möller	Gabriele Lösekrug-Möller	SPD	55,842	39.6	6,055	Hans Peter Thul
48	Hannover-Land II	Matthias Miersch	Matthias Miersch	SPD	73,215	40.4	7,642	Maria Flachsbarth
49	Hildesheim	Bernhard Brinkmann	Bernhard Brinkmann	SPD	64,555	39.0	4,179	Eckart von Klaeden
50	Salzgitter – Wolfenbüttel	Sigmar Gabriel	Sigmar Gabriel	SPD	69,631	44.9	19,112	Jochen-Konrad Fromme
51	Braunschweig	Carola Reimann	Carola Reimann	SPD	53,572	38.8	5,988	Carsten Müller
52	Helmstedt – Wolfsburg	Hans-Jürgen Uhl	Günter Lach	CDU	52,427	39.4	6,363	Heinz-Joachim Barchmann
53	Goslar – Northeim – Osterode	Wilhelm Priesmeier	Wilhelm Priesmeier	SPD	60,107	39.1	5,656	Hans Georg Faust
54	Göttingen	Thomas Oppermann	Thomas Oppermann	SPD	60,483	36.8	3,980	Hartwig Fischer

List members
FDP	GRÜNE	LINKE
Florian Bernschneider; Nicole Bracht-Bendt; Angelika Brunkhorst; Patrick Döring; Hans-Michael Goldmann; Lutz Knopek; Carl-Ludwig Thiele; Serkan Tören; Claudia Winterstein	Viola von Cramon-Taubadel; Thilo Hoppe; Katja Keul; Sven-Christian Kindler; Brigitte Pothmer; Dorothea Steiner; Jürgen Trittin	Herbert Behrens; Diether Dehm; Heidrun Dittrich; Jutta Krellmann; Dorothée Menzner; Herbert Schui
CDU	SPD	
Hartwig Fischer; Maria Flachsbarth; Eckart von Klaeden; Ursula von der Leyen; Rita Pawelski	Heinz-Joachim Barchmann; Lars Klingbeil; Kirsten Lühmann; Holger Ortel; Martin Schwanholz	

=== Bremen ===
Party	Constituency			Party list			Total seats	+/–
Party	Votes	%	Seats	Votes	%	Seats	Total seats	+/–
Social Democratic Party (SPD)	121,467	36.0	2	102,419	30.2	0	2	0
Christian Democratic Union (CDU)	92,441	27.4	0	80,964	23.9	1	1	0
Alliance 90/The Greens (GRÜNE)	48,549	14.4	0	52,283	15.4	1	1	0
The Left (DIE LINKE)	42,873	12.7	0	48,369	14.3	1	1	+1
Free Democratic Party (FDP)	24,437	7.2	0	35,968	10.6	1	1	+1
Pirate Party Germany	–	–	–	8,174	2.4	0	0	New
Alliance 21/RRP	1,563	0.5	0	4,144	1.2	0	0	New
National Democratic Party	4,626	1.4	0	3,612	1.1	0	0	0
German People's Union	–	–	–	1,030	0.3	0	0	New
Party of Bible-abiding Christians	–	–	–	855	0.3	0	0	0
The Republicans	–	–	–	577	0.2	0	0	0
Marxist–Leninist Party	343	0.1	0	216	0.1	0	0	0
Others & Independents	1,480	0.4	0	–	–	–	0	–
Invalid/blank votes	5,248	–	–	4,416	–	–	–	–
Total	343,027	100	2	343,027	100	4	6	+2
Registered voters/turnout	487,978	70.3	–	487,978	70.3	–	–	–
Source: Federal Returning Officer

Constituency members
#	Constituency	Previous member	Elected member	Party	Votes	%	Margin	Runner-up
55	Bremen I	Volker Kröning	Carsten Sieling	SPD	62,588	33.7	9,333	Rita Mohr-Lüllmann
56	Bremen II – Bremerhaven	Uwe Beckmeyer	Uwe Beckmeyer	SPD	58,879	38.7	16,693	Bernd Neumann

List members
CDU	GRÜNE	LINKE	FDP
Bernd Neumann	Marieluise Beck	Agnes Alpers	Torsten Staffeldt

=== Brandenburg ===
Party	Constituency			Party list			Total seats	+/–
Party	Votes	%	Seats	Votes	%	Seats	Total seats	+/–
The Left (DIE LINKE)	410,330	29.7	4	395,566	28.5	2	6	+1
Social Democratic Party (SPD)	397,016	28.7	5	348,216	25.1	0	5	−5
Christian Democratic Union (CDU)	342,692	24.8	1	327,454	23.6	4	5	+1
Free Democratic Party (FDP)	99,769	7.2	0	129,642	9.3	2	2	+1
Alliance 90/The Greens (GRÜNE)	76,546	5.5	0	84,567	6.1	1	1	0
National Democratic Party	46,792	3.4	0	35,396	2.6	0	0	0
Pirate Party Germany	–	–	–	34,832	2.5	0	0	New
German People's Union	–	–	–	13,042	0.9	0	0	New
Free Voters	–	–	–	11,243	0.8	0	0	New
The Republicans	–	–	–	3,084	0.2	0	0	0
Civil Rights Movement Solidarity	–	–	–	2,889	0.2	0	0	0
Marxist–Leninist Party	–	–	–	1,621	0.1	0	0	0
Free Union	915	0.1	0	–	–	–	0	New
Others & Independents	7,905	0.6	0	–	–	–	0	–
Invalid/blank votes	43,337	–	–	37,750	–	–	–	–
Total	1,425,302	100	10	1,425,302	100	9	19	−2
Registered voters/turnout	2,128,715	67.0	–	2,128,715	67.0	–	–	–
Source: Federal Returning Officer

Constituency members
#	Constituency	Previous member	Elected member	Party	Votes	%	Margin	Runner-up
57	Prignitz – Ostprignitz-Ruppin – Havelland I	Ernst Bahr	Dagmar Ziegler	SPD	33,532	32.1	1,334	Kirsten Tackmann
58	Uckermark – Barnim I	Markus Meckel	Sabine Stüber	LINKE	32,791	32.0	5,117	Markus Meckel
59	Oberhavel – Havelland II	Angelika Krüger-Leißner	Angelika Krüger-Leißner	SPD	48,621	29.2	2,533	Uwe Feiler
60	Märkisch-Oderland – Barnim II	Petra Bierwirth	Dagmar Enkelmann	LINKE	62,523	37.0	22,660	Hans-Georg von der Marwitz
61	Brandenburg an der Havel – Potsdam-Mittelmark I – Havelland III – Teltow-Fläming I	Margrit Spielmann	Frank-Walter Steinmeier	SPD	40,957	32.9	5,473	Diana Golze
62	Potsdam – Potsdam-Mittelmark II – Teltow-Fläming II	Andrea Wicklein	Andrea Wicklein	SPD	48,720	28.7	205	Rolf Kutzmutz
63	Dahme-Spreewald – Teltow-Fläming III – Oberspreewald-Lausitz I	Peter Danckert	Peter Danckert	SPD	53,384	32.4	10,036	Steffen Kühne
64	Frankfurt (Oder) – Oder-Spree	Jörg Vogelsänger	Thomas Nord	LINKE	43,589	32.3	5,119	Jörg Vogelsänger
65	Cottbus – Spree-Neiße	Steffen Reiche	Wolfgang Nešković	LINKE	37,224	30.0	2,695	Steffen Reiche
66	Elbe-Elster – Oberspreewald-Lausitz II	Stephan Hilsberg	Michael Stübgen	CDU	35,073	28.9	749	André Brie

List members
CDU	LINKE	FDP	GRÜNE
Jens Koeppen; Hans-Georg von der Marwitz; Katherina Reiche; Andrea Voßhoff	Diana Golze; Kirsten Tackmann	Heinz Lanfermann; Martin Neumann	Cornelia Behm

=== Saxony-Anhalt ===
Party	Constituency			Party list			Total seats	+/–
Party	Votes	%	Seats	Votes	%	Seats	Total seats	+/–
The Left (DIE LINKE)	383,800	32.0	5	389,456	32.4	1	6	+1
Christian Democratic Union (CDU)	388,171	32.3	4	362,311	30.1	1	5	0
Social Democratic Party (SPD)	237,189	19.8	0	202,850	16.9	3	3	−7
Free Democratic Party (FDP)	94,139	7.8	0	124,247	10.3	2	2	0
Alliance 90/The Greens (GRÜNE)	55,547	4.6	0	61,734	5.1	1	1	0
Pirate Party Germany	–	–	–	28,780	2.4	0	0	New
National Democratic Party	30,183	2.5	0	26,584	2.2	0	0	0
German People's Union	–	–	–	3,529	0.3	0	0	New
Marxist–Leninist Party	3,039	0.3	0	3,181	0.3	0	0	0
Others & Independents	8,709	0.7	0	–	–	–	0	–
Invalid/blank votes	25,944	–	–	24,049	–	–	–	–
Total	1,226,721	100	9	1,226,721	100	8	17	−6
Registered voters/turnout	2,028,572	60.5	–	2,028,572	60.5	–	–	–
Source: Federal Returning Officer

Constituency members
#	Constituency	Previous member	Elected member	Party	Votes	%	Margin	Runner-up
67	Altmark	Marko Mühlstein	Katrin Kunert	LINKE	36,910	33.4	2,409	Hans-Heinrich Jordan
68	Börde – Jerichower Land	New seat	Manfred Behrens	CDU	46,686	32.7	5,646	Thomas Waldheim
69	Harz	Andreas Steppuhn	Heike Brehmer	CDU	46,632	33.0	2,680	Elke Reinke
70	Magdeburg	Uwe Küster	Rosemarie Hein	LINKE	48,069	32.0	1,588	Bernd Heynemann
71	Dessau – Wittenberg	New seat	Ulrich Petzold	CDU	43,424	36.0	6,615	Jörg Schindler
72	Anhalt	Engelbert Wistuba	Jan Korte	LINKE	44,087	31.6	365	Kees de Vries
73	Halle	Christel Riemann-Hanewinckel	Petra Sitte	LINKE	46,272	33.7	3,842	Christoph Bergner
74	Burgenland – Saalekreis	Maik Reichel	Dieter Stier	CDU	41,281	33.0	1,671	Roland Claus
75	Mansfeld	Silvia Schmidt	Harald Koch	LINKE	47,051	35.2	4,037	Uda Heller

List members
SPD	FDP	LINKE
Burkhard Lischka; Silvia Schmidt; Waltraud Wolff	Jens Ackermann; Cornelia Pieper	Roland Claus
CDU	GRÜNE	
Christoph Bergner	Undine Kurth	

=== Berlin ===
Party	Constituency			Party list			Total seats	+/–
Party	Votes	%	Seats	Votes	%	Seats	Total seats	+/–
Christian Democratic Union (CDU)	452,542	26.3	5	393,180	22.8	1	6	+1
The Left (DIE LINKE)	355,640	20.7	4	348,661	20.2	1	5	+1
Social Democratic Party (SPD)	418,045	24.3	2	348,082	20.2	3	5	−3
Alliance 90/The Greens (GRÜNE)	298,277	17.4	1	299,535	17.4	3	4	+1
Free Democratic Party (FDP)	123,780	7.2	0	198,516	11.5	3	3	+1
Pirate Party Germany	–	–	–	58,062	3.4	0	0	New
National Democratic Party	34,488	2.0	0	27,799	1.6	0	0	0
Human Environment Animal Protection Party	–	–	–	23,528	1.4	0	0	0
The Republicans	–	–	–	5,921	0.3	0	0	0
The Violets	875	0.1	0	5,492	0.3	0	0	New
Civil Rights Movement Solidarity	10,946	0.6	0	4,709	0.3	0	0	0
Ecological Democratic Party	–	–	–	3,220	0.2	0	0	New
German People's Union	–	–	–	2,275	0.1	0	0	New
German Communist Party	929	0.1	0	1,894	0.1	0	0	New
Socialist Equality Party	–	–	–	1,420	0.1	0	0	0
Marxist–Leninist Party	901	0.1	0	1,111	0.1	0	0	0
Family Party	1,416	0.1	0	–	–	–	0	0
Others & Independents	20,920	1.2	0	–	–	–	0	–
Invalid/blank votes	34,080	–	–	29,434	–	–	–	–
Total	1,752,839	100	12	1,752,839	100	11	23	+1
Registered voters/turnout	2,471,665	70.9	–	2,471,665	70.9	–	–	–
Source: Federal Returning Officer

Constituency members
#	Constituency	Previous member	Elected member	Party	Votes	%	Margin	Runner-up
76	Berlin-Mitte	Jörg-Otto Spiller	Eva Högl	SPD	33,943	26.0	5,183	Christian Burholt
77	Berlin-Pankow	Wolfgang Thierse	Stefan Liebich	LINKE	47,070	28.8	2,301	Wolfgang Thierse
78	Berlin-Reinickendorf	Detlef Dzembritzki	Frank Steffel	CDU	50,554	39.0	15,014	Jörg Stroedter
79	Berlin-Spandau – Charlottenburg North	Swen Schulz	Kai Wegner	CDU	44,994	36.4	3,943	Swen Schulz
80	Berlin-Steglitz-Zehlendorf	Karl-Georg Wellmann	Karl-Georg Wellmann	CDU	66,075	38.8	20,384	Klaus Uwe Benneter
81	Berlin-Charlottenburg-Wilmersdorf	Petra-Evelyne Merkel	Petra-Evelyne Merkel	SPD	47,340	32.0	2,791	Ingo Schmitt
82	Berlin-Tempelhof-Schöneberg	Mechthild Rawert	Jan-Marco Luczak	CDU	54,971	32.5	10,465	Renate Künast
83	Berlin-Neukölln	Ditmar Staffelt	Stefanie Vogelsang	CDU	39,618	30.8	4,450	Fritz Felgentreu
84	Berlin-Friedrichshain-Kreuzberg – Prenzlauer Berg East	Hans-Christian Ströbele	Hans-Christian Ströbele	GRÜNE	73,897	46.7	46,101	Halina Wawzyniak
85	Berlin-Treptow-Köpenick	Gregor Gysi	Gregor Gysi	LINKE	62,880	44.8	33,756	Niels Korte
86	Berlin-Marzahn-Hellersdorf	Petra Pau	Petra Pau	LINKE	60,236	47.7	35,673	Monika Grütters
87	Berlin-Lichtenberg	Gesine Lötzsch	Gesine Lötzsch	LINKE	61,874	47.4	37,846	Andreas Geisel

List members
SPD	GRÜNE	FDP
Mechthild Rawert; Swen Schulz; Wolfgang Thierse	Renate Künast; Elisabeth Paus; Wolfgang Wieland	Hellmut Königshaus; Lars Lindemann; Martin Lindner
CDU	LINKE	
Monika Grütters	Halina Wawzyniak	

=== North Rhine-Westphalia ===
Party	Constituency			Party list			Total seats	+/–
Party	Votes	%	Seats	Votes	%	Seats	Total seats	+/–
Christian Democratic Union (CDU)	3,706,284	39.6	37	3,111,478	33.1	8	45	−1
Social Democratic Party (SPD)	3,286,593	35.1	27	2,678,956	28.5	12	39	−15
Free Democratic Party (FDP)	832,146	8.9	0	1,394,554	14.9	20	20	+7
Alliance 90/The Greens (GRÜNE)	728,745	7.8	0	945,831	10.1	14	14	+4
The Left (DIE LINKE)	669,045	7.1	0	789,814	8.4	11	11	+4
Pirate Party Germany	–	–	–	158,585	1.7	0	0	New
National Democratic Party	112,709	1.2	0	88,690	0.9	0	0	0
Human Environment Animal Protection Party	2,217	0.0	0	59,731	0.6	0	0	0
Family Party	5,269	0.1	0	45,106	0.5	0	0	0
Pensioners' Party	–	–	–	33,821	0.4	0	0	New
The Republicans	2,768	0.0	0	30,015	0.3	0	0	0
Alliance 21/RRP	–	–	–	12,952	0.1	0	0	New
Alliance for Germany	2,550	0.0	0	9,367	0.1	0	0	0
Ecological Democratic Party	2,676	0.0	0	8,866	0.1	0	0	New
German People's Union	–	–	–	7,358	0.1	0	0	New
Centre Party	–	–	–	6,087	0.1	0	0	0
Marxist–Leninist Party	6,636	0.1	0	4,268	0.0	0	0	0
Civil Rights Movement Solidarity	2,662	0.0	0	2,396	0.0	0	0	0
Socialist Equality Party	–	–	–	1,537	0.0	0	0	0
The Violets	446	0.0	0	–	–	–	0	New
Others & Independents	6,019	0.1	0	–	–	–	0	–
Invalid/blank votes	127,085	–	–	104,438	–	–	–	–
Total	9,493,850	100	64	9,493,850	100	65	129	−1
Registered voters/turnout	13,288,291	71.4	–	13,288,291	71.4	–	–	–
Source: Federal Returning Officer

Constituency members
#	Constituency	Previous member	Elected member	Party	Votes	%	Margin	Runner-up
88	Aachen	Ulla Schmidt	Rudolf Henke	CDU	50,703	39.4	12,180	Ulla Schmidt
89	Kreis Aachen	Achim Großmann	Helmut Brandt	CDU	63,511	40.2	9,306	Martin Peters
90	Heinsberg	Leo Dautzenberg	Leo Dautzenberg	CDU	65,143	50.4	34,032	Norbert Spinrath
91	Düren	Thomas Rachel	Thomas Rachel	CDU	65,662	46.4	22,007	Dietmar Nietan
92	Erftkreis I	Gabriele Frechen	Willi Zylajew	CDU	69,845	39.4	6,358	Gabriele Frechen
93	Euskirchen – Erftkreis II	Wolf Bauer	Detlef Seif	CDU	75,290	43.6	25,255	Helga Kühn-Mengel
94	Cologne I	Martin Dörmann	Martin Dörmann	SPD	43,837	35.0	1,743	Ursula Heinen-Esser
95	Cologne II	Lale Akgün	Michael Paul	CDU	59,710	34.9	4,239	Lale Akgün
96	Cologne III	Rolf Mützenich	Rolf Mützenich	SPD	47,625	35.9	9,532	Artur Tybussek
97	Bonn	Ulrich Kelber	Ulrich Kelber	SPD	55,251	33.3	2,577	Stephan Eisel
98	Rhein-Sieg-Kreis I	Elisabeth Winkelmeier-Becker	Elisabeth Winkelmeier-Becker	CDU	73,959	44.9	31,391	Dietmar Tendler
99	Rhein-Sieg-Kreis II	Norbert Röttgen	Norbert Röttgen	CDU	80,363	50.3	40,874	Ulrike Merten
100	Oberbergischer Kreis	Klaus-Peter Flosbach	Klaus-Peter Flosbach	CDU	71,759	48.4	30,594	Michaela Engelmeier
101	Rheinisch-Bergischer Kreis	Wolfgang Bosbach	Wolfgang Bosbach	CDU	82,523	50.0	38,531	Lasse Pütz
102	Leverkusen – Cologne IV	Karl Lauterbach	Karl Lauterbach	SPD	53,517	37.1	2,275	Thomas Portz
103	Wuppertal I	Manfred Zöllmer	Manfred Zöllmer	SPD	51,180	35.8	2,159	Peter Hintze
104	Solingen – Remscheid – Wuppertal II	Jürgen Kucharczyk	Jürgen Hardt	CDU	62,365	39.0	7,455	Jürgen Kucharczyk
105	Mettmann I	Michaela Noll	Michaela Noll	CDU	66,300	44.5	15,981	Peer Steinbrück
106	Mettmann II	Kerstin Griese	Peter Beyer	CDU	48,276	39.8	5,103	Kerstin Griese
107	Düsseldorf I	Hildegard Müller	Thomas Jarzombek	CDU	68,749	43.5	23,624	Michael Müller
108	Düsseldorf II	Karin Kortmann	Beatrix Philipp	CDU	50,233	37.7	5,938	Karin Kortmann
109	Neuss I	Hermann Gröhe	Hermann Gröhe	CDU	70,787	47.8	27,173	Hubert Eßer
110	Mönchengladbach	Günter Krings	Günter Krings	CDU	55,784	45.6	21,932	Hermann-Josef Krichel-Mäurer
111	Krefeld I – Neuss II	Willy Wimmer	Ansgar Heveling	CDU	62,639	42.3	19,552	Bernd Scheelen
112	Viersen	Uwe Schummer	Uwe Schummer	CDU	79,359	48.9	37,668	Udo Schiefner
113	Kleve	Ronald Pofalla	Ronald Pofalla	CDU	76,480	48.9	30,190	Barbara Hendricks
114	Wesel I	Hans-Ulrich Krüger	Sabine Weiss	CDU	57,576	38.5	351	Hans-Ulrich Krüger
115	Krefeld II – Wesel II	Siegmund Ehrmann	Siegmund Ehrmann	SPD	50,636	39.6	5,730	Kerstin Radomski
116	Duisburg I	Petra Weis	Bärbel Bas	SPD	53,363	42.2	13,362	Thomas Mahlberg
117	Duisburg II	Johannes Pflug	Mahmut Özdemir	SPD	44,436	47.4	19,657	Volker Mosblech
118	Oberhausen – Wesel III	Wolfgang Grotthaus	Michael Groschek	SPD	65,189	44.6	25,188	Marie-Luise Dött
119	Mülheim – Essen I	Anton Schaaf	Anton Schaaf	SPD	57,547	41.4	12,894	Andreas Schmidt
120	Essen II	Rolf Hempelmann	Rolf Hempelmann	SPD	49,023	46.1	20,055	Jutta Eckenbach
121	Essen III	Petra Hinz	Petra Hinz	SPD	57,055	38.6	3,786	Matthias Hauer
122	Recklinghausen I	Frank Schwabe	Frank Schwabe	SPD	52,627	43.1	15,123	Philipp Mißfelder
123	Recklinghausen II	Waltraud Lehn	Michael Groß	SPD	58,984	42.6	14,963	Astrid Timmermann-Fechter
124	Gelsenkirchen	Joachim Poß	Joachim Poß	SPD	64,623	54.3	33,612	Wolfgang Meckelburg
125	Steinfurt I – Borken I	Jens Spahn	Jens Spahn	CDU	63,123	44.5	20,387	Ingrid Arndt-Brauer
126	Bottrop – Recklinghausen III	Dieter Grasedieck	Michael Gerdes	SPD	62,810	42.8	14,520	Sven Volmering
127	Borken II	Johannes Röring	Johannes Röring	CDU	79,254	54.2	41,930	Christoph Pries
128	Coesfeld – Steinfurt II	Karl Schiewerling	Karl Schiewerling	CDU	73,636	50.8	36,785	Angelica Schwall-Düren
129	Steinfurt III	Reinhold Hemker	Anja Karliczek	CDU	61,444	43.3	2,765	Reinhold Hemker
130	Münster	Christoph Strässer	Sybille Benning	CDU	63,819	39.3	10,790	Christoph Strässer
131	Warendorf	Peter Paziorek	Reinhold Sendker	CDU	75,187	49.0	25,191	Bernhard Daldrup
132	Gütersloh	Hubert Deittert	Ralph Brinkhaus	CDU	74,149	44.7	20,640	Klaus Brandner
133	Bielefeld	Rainer Wend	Lena Strothmann	CDU	64,621	36.3	3,216	Guntram Schneider
134	Herford – Minden-Lübbecke II	Wolfgang Spanier	Stefan Schwartze	SPD	62,644	38.5	1,400	Wolfgang Rußkamp
135	Minden-Lübbecke I	Lothar Ibrügger	Steffen Kampeter	CDU	61,751	42.5	4,190	Achim Post
136	Lippe I	Dirk Becker	Dirk Becker	SPD	50,688	40.2	4,241	Cajus Julius Caesar
137	Höxter – Lippe II	Jürgen Herrmann	Jürgen Herrmann	CDU	71,813	46.1	22,664	Werner Böhler
138	Paderborn	Gerhard Wächter	Carsten Linnemann	CDU	88,754	52.1	45,634	Ute Berg
139	Hagen – Ennepe-Ruhr-Kreis I	René Röspel	René Röspel	SPD	63,980	43.0	14,087	Carmen Knollmann
140	Ennepe-Ruhr-Kreis II	Christel Humme	Christel Humme	SPD	54,845	40.9	14,082	Ralf Brauksiepe
141	Bochum I	Axel Schäfer	Axel Schäfer	SPD	65,810	43.3	18,780	Norbert Lammert
142	Herne – Bochum II	Gerd Bollmann	Gerd Bollmann	SPD	64,331	51.3	30,638	Ingrid Fischbach
143	Dortmund I	Marco Bülow	Marco Bülow	SPD	60,839	41.2	20,216	Steffen Kanitz
144	Dortmund II	Ulla Burchardt	Ulla Burchardt	SPD	59,141	42.4	18,519	Erich G. Fritz
145	Unna I	Rolf Stöckel	Oliver Kaczmarek	SPD	62,638	42.6	14,936	Hubert Hüppe
146	Hamm – Unna II	Dieter Wiefelspütz	Dieter Wiefelspütz	SPD	72,446	43.9	18,358	Laurenz Meyer
147	Soest	Bernhard Schulte-Drüggelte	Bernhard Schulte-Drüggelte	CDU	74,725	45.8	27,142	Wolfgang Hellmich
148	Hochsauerlandkreis	Friedrich Merz	Patrick Sensburg	CDU	77,687	51.7	37,677	Karsten Rudolph
149	Siegen-Wittgenstein	Willi Brase	Volkmar Klein	CDU	64,217	41.5	3,717	Willi Brase
150	Olpe – Märkischer Kreis I	Hartmut Schauerte	Matthias Heider	CDU	70,705	47.4	28,432	Petra Crone
151	Märkischer Kreis II	Dagmar Freitag	Dagmar Freitag	SPD	59,521	41.0	6,770	Christel Voßbeck-Kayser

List members
FDP	GRÜNE	SPD
Daniel Bahr; Claudia Bögel; Marco Buschmann; Helga Daub; Bijan Djir-Sarai; Jörg van Essen; Ulrike Flach; Otto Fricke; Paul Friedhoff; Werner Hoyer; Heiner Kamp; Michael Kauch; Gudrun Kopp; Christian Lindner; Gabi Molitor; Petra Müller; Gisela Piltz; Frank Schäffler; Johannes Vogel; Guido Westerwelle	Volker Beck; Katja Dörner; Kai Gehring; Britta Haßelmann; Bettina Herlitzius; Bärbel Höhn; Maria Klein-Schmeink; Ute Koczy; Oliver Krischer; Markus Kurth; Kerstin Müller; Friedrich Ostendorff; Hermann E. Ott; Frithjof Schmidt	Ingrid Arndt-Brauer; Klaus Brandner; Willi Brase; Petra Crone; Barbara Hendricks; Franz Müntefering; Dietmar Nietan; Bernd Scheelen; Ulla Schmidt; Angelica Schwall-Düren; Peer Steinbrück; Christoph Strässer
LINKE	CDU	
Matthias Birkwald; Sevim Dağdelen; Inge Höger; Andrej Hunko; Ulla Jelpke; Ursula Lötzer; Niema Movassat; Ingrid Remmers; Paul Schäfer; Kathrin Vogler; Sahra Wagenknecht	Ralf Brauksiepe; Marie-Luise Dött; Ingrid Fischbach; Erich G. Fritz; Ursula Heinen-Esser; Peter Hintze; Norbert Lammert; Philipp Mißfelder	

=== Saxony ===
Party	Constituency			Party list			Total seats	+/–
Party	Votes	%	Seats	Votes	%	Seats	Total seats	+/–
Christian Democratic Union (CDU)	888,018	39.5	16	800,898	35.6	0	16	+2
The Left (DIE LINKE)	543,805	24.2	0	551,461	24.5	8	8	0
Social Democratic Party (SPD)	339,102	15.1	0	328,753	14.6	5	5	−3
Free Democratic Party (FDP)	230,005	10.2	0	299,135	13.3	4	4	0
Alliance 90/The Greens (GRÜNE)	136,047	6.0	0	151,283	6.7	2	2	0
National Democratic Party	91,451	4.1	0	89,611	4.0	0	0	0
Civil Rights Movement Solidarity	12,382	0.6	0	18,789	0.8	0	0	0
The Republicans	–	–	–	7,148	0.3	0	0	0
Marxist–Leninist Party	436	0.0	0	5,281	0.2	0	0	0
Party of Bible-abiding Christians	1,290	0.1	0	–	–	–	0	0
Others & Independents	7,142	0.3	0	–	–	–	0	–
Invalid/blank votes	36,275	–	–	33,594	–	–	–	–
Total	2,285,953	100	16	2,285,953	100	19	35	−1
Registered voters/turnout	3,518,195	65.0	–	3,518,195	65.0	–	–	–
Source: Federal Returning Officer

Constituency members
#	Constituency	Previous member	Elected member	Party	Votes	%	Margin	Runner-up
152	Nordsachsen	Manfred Kolbe	Marian Wendt	CDU	44,147	40.9	16,387	Peter Porsch
153	Leipzig I	Rainer Fornahl	Bettina Kudla	CDU	42,704	33.3	8,689	Barbara Höll
154	Leipzig II	Gunter Weißgerber	Thomas Feist	CDU	41,101	28.8	4,984	Mike Nagler
155	Leipzig-Land	Katharina Landgraf	Katharina Landgraf	CDU	60,969	41.7	27,925	Axel Troost
156	Meißen	New seat	Thomas de Maizière	CDU	62,290	45.2	32,867	Hendrik Thalheim
157	Bautzen I	New seat	Maria Michalk	CDU	64,325	42.3	26,084	Caren Lay
158	Görlitz	Michael Kretschmer	Michael Kretschmer	CDU	62,338	42.4	26,552	Ilja Seifert
159	Sächsische Schweiz-Osterzgebirge	Klaus Brähmig	Klaus Brähmig	CDU	62,530	45.1	34,297	Monika Knoche
160	Dresden I	Andreas Lämmel	Andreas Lämmel	CDU	56,749	36.6	19,569	Katja Kipping
161	Dresden II – Bautzen II	Arnold Vaatz	Arnold Vaatz	CDU	55,401	36.4	25,722	Klaus Sühl
162	Mittelsachsen	New seat	Veronika Bellmann	CDU	61,579	43.6	28,835	Lothar Schmidt
163	Chemnitz	Detlef Müller	Frank Heinrich	CDU	45,876	34.1	8,443	Michael Leutert
164	Chemnitzer Umland – Erzgebirgskreis II	New seat	Marco Wanderwitz	CDU	54,065	41.2	30,932	Jörn Wunderlich
165	Erzgebirgskreis I	New seat	Günter Baumann	CDU	63,211	40.3	26,045	Andrea Schrutek
166	Zwickau	Michael Luther	Carsten Körber	CDU	55,605	38.8	15,340	Sabine Zimmermann
167	Vogtlandkreis	Robert Hochbaum	Robert Hochbaum	CDU	55,128	40.9	21,542	Janina Pfau

List members
LINKE	SPD	FDP	GRÜNE
Barbara Höll; Katja Kipping; Caren Lay; Michael Leutert; Ilja Seifert; Axel Troost; Jörn Wunderlich; Sabine Zimmermann	Wolfgang Gunkel; Daniela Kolbe; Rolf Schwanitz; Wolfgang Tiefensee; Marlies Volkmer	Reiner Deutschmann; Joachim Günther; Heinz-Peter Haustein; Jan Mücke	Stephan Kühn; Monika Lazar

=== Hesse ===
Party	Constituency			Party list			Total seats	+/–
Party	Votes	%	Seats	Votes	%	Seats	Total seats	+/–
Christian Democratic Union (CDU)	1,251,139	39.4	15	1,022,822	32.2	0	15	0
Social Democratic Party (SPD)	1,026,094	32.3	6	812,721	25.6	6	12	−4
Free Democratic Party (FDP)	305,043	9.6	0	527,432	16.6	8	8	+3
Alliance 90/The Greens (GRÜNE)	287,044	9.0	0	381,948	12.0	6	6	+1
The Left (DIE LINKE)	225,775	7.1	0	271,455	8.5	4	4	+2
Pirate Party Germany	3,866	0.1	0	66,708	2.1	0	0	New
National Democratic Party	44,260	1.4	0	35,929	1.1	0	0	0
Human Environment Animal Protection Party	14,670	0.5	0	31,917	1.0	0	0	0
The Republicans	6,863	0.2	0	19,240	0.6	0	0	0
Civil Rights Movement Solidarity	1,357	0.0	0	3,746	0.1	0	0	0
German People's Union	–	–	–	2,516	0.1	0	0	New
Marxist–Leninist Party	489	0.0	0	1,137	0.0	0	0	0
Alliance of the Centre	396	0.0	0	–	–	–	0	New
Others & Independents	5,043	0.2	0	–	–	–	0	–
Invalid/blank votes	72,602	–	–	67,070	–	–	–	–
Total	3,244,641	100	21	3,244,641	100	24	45	+2
Registered voters/turnout	4,398,919	73.8	–	4,398,919	73.8	–	–	–
Source: Federal Returning Officer

Constituency members
#	Constituency	Previous member	Elected member	Party	Votes	%	Margin	Runner-up
168	Waldeck	Alfred Hartenbach	Ullrich Meßmer	SPD	51,737	37.8	3,323	Thomas Viesehon
169	Kassel	Hans Eichel	Ulrike Gottschalck	SPD	59,621	38.0	11,978	Jürgen Gehb
170	Werra-Meißner – Hersfeld-Rotenburg	Michael Roth	Michael Roth	SPD	53,275	40.4	7,564	Helmut Heiderich
171	Schwalm-Eder	Gerd Höfer	Edgar Franke	SPD	56,519	40.3	9,466	Bernd Siebert
172	Marburg	Sören Bartol	Sören Bartol	SPD	51,712	38.9	4,390	Stefan Heck
173	Lahn-Dill	Helga Lopez	Sibylle Pfeiffer	CDU	60,214	41.6	12,317	Dagmar Schmidt
174	Gießen	Rüdiger Veit	Helge Braun	CDU	59,441	36.7	4,110	Rüdiger Veit
175	Fulda	Michael Brand	Michael Brand	CDU	86,084	49.8	44,696	Claudia Blum
176	Hochtaunus	Holger Haibach	Holger Haibach	CDU	62,748	45.2	27,491	Hans-Joachim Schabedoth
177	Wetterau I	Nina Hauer	Lucia Puttrich	CDU	73,702	41.0	14,282	Nina Hauer
178	Rheingau-Taunus – Limburg	Klaus-Peter Willsch	Klaus-Peter Willsch	CDU	75,224	46.1	30,097	Martin Rabanus
179	Wiesbaden	Heidemarie Wieczorek-Zeul	Kristina Schröder	CDU	53,416	40.8	10,665	Heidemarie Wieczorek-Zeul
180	Hanau	Sascha Raabe	Peter Tauber	CDU	68,704	39.4	9,291	Sascha Raabe
181	Main-Taunus	Heinz Riesenhuber	Heinz Riesenhuber	CDU	72,680	47.5	36,051	Nicole Ritter
182	Frankfurt am Main I	Gregor Amann	Matthias Zimmer	CDU	45,866	35.2	6,719	Gregor Amann
183	Frankfurt am Main II	Erika Steinbach	Erika Steinbach	CDU	55,027	35.8	9,953	Ulli Nissen
184	Groß-Gerau	Gerold Reichenbach	Franz Josef Jung	CDU	45,410	36.3	437	Gerold Reichenbach
185	Offenbach	Klaus Lippold	Peter Wichtel	CDU	62,281	40.2	17,739	Uta Zapf
186	Darmstadt	Brigitte Zypries	Brigitte Zypries	SPD	60,581	35.0	45	Andreas Storm
187	Odenwald	Patricia Lips	Patricia Lips	CDU	69,191	40.4	18,394	Detlev Blitz
188	Bergstraße	Michael Meister	Michael Meister	CDU	64,472	44.4	19,569	Christine Lambrecht

List members
FDP	SPD	GRÜNE	LINKE
Mechthild Dyckmans; Wolfgang Gerhardt; Heinrich Leonhard Kolb; Hans-Joachim Otto; Stefan Ruppert; Björn Sänger; Christoph Schnurr; Hermann Otto Solms	Christine Lambrecht; Sascha Raabe; Gerold Reichenbach; Rüdiger Veit; Heidemarie Wieczorek-Zeul; Uta Zapf	Priska Hinz; Tom Koenigs; Nicole Maisch; Omid Nouripour; Wolfgang Strengmann-Kuhn; Daniela Wagner	Christine Buchholz; Werner Dreibus; Wolfgang Gehrcke; Sabine Leidig

=== Thuringia ===
Party	Constituency			Party list			Total seats	+/–
Party	Votes	%	Seats	Votes	%	Seats	Total seats	+/–
Christian Democratic Union (CDU)	407,357	33.1	7	383,778	31.2	0	7	+2
The Left (DIE LINKE)	357,428	29.1	2	354,875	28.8	3	5	0
Social Democratic Party (SPD)	255,060	20.7	0	216,593	17.6	3	3	−3
Free Democratic Party (FDP)	94,685	7.7	0	120,635	9.8	2	2	+1
Alliance 90/The Greens (GRÜNE)	63,030	5.1	0	73,838	6.0	1	1	0
National Democratic Party	43,588	3.5	0	39,603	3.2	0	0	0
Pirate Party Germany	–	–	–	31,031	2.5	0	0	New
Ecological Democratic Party	1,416	0.1	0	5,086	0.4	0	0	New
The Republicans	–	–	–	4,339	0.4	0	0	0
Marxist–Leninist Party	582	0.0	0	1,991	0.2	0	0	0
Others & Independents	6,698	0.5	0	–	–	–	0	–
Invalid/blank votes	17,920	–	–	15,995	–	–	–	–
Total	1,247,764	100	9	1,247,764	100	9	18	0
Registered voters/turnout	1,913,559	65.2	–	1,913,559	65.2	–	–	–
Source: Federal Returning Officer

Constituency members
#	Constituency	Previous member	Elected member	Party	Votes	%	Margin	Runner-up
189	Eichsfeld – Nordhausen – Unstrut-Hainich-Kreis I	Manfred Grund	Manfred Grund	CDU	57,882	43.0	24,877	Alexander Scharff
190	Eisenach – Wartburgkreis – Unstrut-Hainich-Kreis II	Ernst Kranz	Christian Hirte	CDU	44,903	34.8	9,237	Anja Müller
191	Kyffhäuserkreis – Sömmerda – Weimarer Land I	Peter Albach	Johannes Selle	CDU	42,674	33.9	16,749	Kersten Naumann
192	Gotha – Ilm-Kreis	Petra Heß	Tankred Schipanski	CDU	40,063	29.1	3,031	Petra Heß
193	Erfurt – Weimar – Weimarer Land II	Carsten Schneider	Antje Tillmann	CDU	45,931	30.8	2,881	Frank Spieth
194	Gera – Jena – Saale-Holzland-Kreis	Volker Blumentritt	Ralph Lenkert	LINKE	49,344	30.4	2,754	Roland Richwien
195	Greiz – Altenburger Land	Volkmar Vogel	Volkmar Vogel	CDU	42,988	37.4	9,316	Frank Tempel
196	Sonneberg – Saalfeld-Rudolstadt – Saale-Orla-Kreis	Gerhard Botz	Carola Stauche	CDU	46,726	31.9	906	Norbert Schneider
197	Suhl – Schmalkalden-Meiningen – Hildburghausen	Iris Gleicke	Jens Petermann	LINKE	41,361	32.2	1,761	Alexander Kästner

List members
LINKE	SPD	FDP	GRÜNE
Luc Jochimsen; Kersten Steinke; Frank Tempel	Iris Gleicke; Steffen-Claudio Lemme; Carsten Schneider	Patrick Kurth; Peter Röhlinger	Katrin Göring-Eckardt

=== Rhineland-Palatinate ===
Party	Constituency			Party list			Total seats	+/–
Party	Votes	%	Seats	Votes	%	Seats	Total seats	+/–
Christian Democratic Union (CDU)	903,528	41.4	13	767,487	35.0	0	13	+1
Social Democratic Party (SPD)	640,617	29.4	2	520,990	23.8	6	8	−3
Free Democratic Party (FDP)	231,938	10.6	0	364,673	16.6	5	5	+1
Alliance 90/The Greens (GRÜNE)	174,941	8.0	0	211,971	9.7	3	3	+1
The Left (DIE LINKE)	177,323	8.1	0	205,180	9.4	3	3	+1
Pirate Party Germany	3,188	0.1	0	41,728	1.9	0	0	New
National Democratic Party	34,514	1.6	0	26,077	1.2	0	0	0
Family Party	3,140	0.1	0	22,279	1.0	0	0	0
The Republicans	3,631	0.2	0	18,208	0.8	0	0	0
Ecological Democratic Party	2,384	0.1	0	6,334	0.3	0	0	New
Party of Bible-abiding Christians	–	–	–	5,823	0.3	0	0	0
German People's Union	–	–	–	1,729	0.1	0	0	New
Marxist–Leninist Party	210	0.0	0	650	0.0	0	0	0
The Violets	833	0.0	0	–	–	–	0	New
Civil Rights Movement Solidarity	304	0.0	0	–	–	–	0	0
Others & Independents	4,009	0.2	0	–	–	–	0	–
Invalid/blank votes	52,988	–	–	40,419	–	–	–	–
Total	2,233,548	100	15	2,233,548	100	17	32	+1
Registered voters/turnout	3,103,878	72.0	–	3,103,878	72.0	–	–	–
Source: Federal Returning Officer

Constituency members
#	Constituency	Previous member	Elected member	Party	Votes	%	Margin	Runner-up
198	Neuwied	Sabine Bätzing	Erwin Rüddel	CDU	66,214	39.2	4,670	Sabine Bätzing
199	Ahrweiler	Wilhelm Josef Sebastian	Mechthild Heil	CDU	62,145	45.5	28,158	Andrea Nahles
200	Koblenz	Michael Fuchs	Michael Fuchs	CDU	59,853	44.1	21,773	Ursula Mogg
201	Mosel/Rhein-Hunsrück	Peter Bleser	Peter Bleser	CDU	60,105	47.7	30,246	Marcus Heintel
202	Kreuznach	Julia Klöckner	Julia Klöckner	CDU	61,167	47.0	23,835	Fritz Rudolf Körper
203	Bitburg	Peter Rauen	Patrick Schnieder	CDU	53,705	46.1	25,663	Elke Leonhard
204	Trier	Bernhard Kaster	Bernhard Kaster	CDU	61,594	45.7	26,646	Manfred Nink
205	Montabaur	Joachim Hörster	Joachim Hörster	CDU	65,215	43.2	20,799	Björn Walden
206	Mainz	Michael Hartmann	Ute Granold	CDU	68,081	36.3	10,743	Michael Hartmann
207	Worms	Klaus Hagemann	Klaus Hagemann	CDU	54,255	37.6	2,363	Ludwig Tauscher
208	Ludwigshafen/Frankenthal	Doris Barnett	Maria Böhmer	CDU	57,736	38.4	9,023	Doris Barnett
209	Neustadt – Speyer	Norbert Schindler	Norbert Schindler	CDU	71,481	44.6	31,077	Wolfgang Ressmann
210	Kaiserslautern	Gustav Herzog	Gustav Herzog	SPD	55,070	34.6	2,759	Xaver Jung
211	Pirmasens	Anita Schäfer	Anita Schäfer	CDU	50,035	39.4	15,963	Sabine Wilhelm
212	Südpfalz	Ralf Göbel	Thomas Gebhart	CDU	61,994	40.7	19,707	Heinz Schmitt

List members
SPD	FDP	GRÜNE	LINKE
Doris Barnett; Sabine Bätzing-Lichtenthäler; Michael Hartmann; Fritz Rudolf Körper; Andrea Nahles; Manfred Nink	Rainer Brüderle; Edmund Geisen; Manuel Höferlin; Elke Hoff; Volker Wissing	Ulrike Höfken; Tabea Rößner; Josef Winkler	Kathrin Senger-Schäfer; Alexander Ulrich; Katrin Werner

=== Bavaria ===
Party	Constituency			Party list			Total seats	+/–
Party	Votes	%	Seats	Votes	%	Seats	Total seats	+/–
Christian Social Union in Bavaria (CSU)	3,191,000	48.2	45	2,830,238	42.5	0	45	−1
Social Democratic Party (SPD)	1,331,177	20.1	0	1,120,018	16.8	16	16	−8
Free Democratic Party (FDP)	700,960	10.6	0	976,379	14.7	14	14	+5
Alliance 90/The Greens (GRÜNE)	675,888	10.2	0	719,265	10.8	10	10	+3
The Left (DIE LINKE)	386,476	5.8	0	429,371	6.5	6	6	+3
Pirate Party Germany	24,102	0.4	0	135,790	2.0	0	0	New
National Democratic Party	111,662	1.7	0	87,591	1.3	0	0	0
Ecological Democratic Party	83,568	1.3	0	75,866	1.1	0	0	New
The Republicans	13,564	0.2	0	54,588	0.8	0	0	0
Alliance 21/RRP	22,179	0.3	0	48,458	0.7	0	0	New
Bavaria Party	32,324	0.5	0	48,311	0.7	0	0	0
Family Party	3,921	0.1	0	44,421	0.7	0	0	0
Human Environment Animal Protection Party	–	–	–	43,215	0.6	0	0	0
The Violets	2,064	0.0	0	13,872	0.2	0	0	New
Party of Bible-abiding Christians	921	0.0	0	9,262	0.1	0	0	0
Christian Centre	–	–	–	6,826	0.1	0	0	0
German People's Union	–	–	–	3,491	0.1	0	0	New
Civil Rights Movement Solidarity	5,466	0.1	0	3,305	0.0	0	0	0
Marxist–Leninist Party	540	0.0	0	1,769	0.0	0	0	0
Free Union	5,206	0.1	0	–	–	–	0	New
Others & Independents	34,779	0.5	0	–	–	–	0	–
Invalid/blank votes	94,735	–	–	68,496	–	–	–	–
Total	6,720,532	100	45	6,720,532	100	46	91	+2
Registered voters/turnout	9,382,583	71.6	–	9,382,583	71.6	–	–	–
Source: Federal Returning Officer

Constituency members
#	Constituency	Previous member	Elected member	Party	Votes	%	Margin	Runner-up
213	Altötting	Stephan Mayer	Stephan Mayer	CSU	67,284	60.7	50,560	Werner Groß
214	Erding – Ebersberg	Maximilian Lehmer	Maximilian Lehmer	CSU	67,518	48.9	43,116	Ewald Schurer
215	Freising	Franz Obermeier	Franz Obermeier	CSU	69,229	46.9	43,821	Michael Stanglmaier
216	Fürstenfeldbruck	Gerda Hasselfeldt	Gerda Hasselfeldt	CSU	91,947	48.9	56,096	Peter Falk
217	Ingolstadt	Horst Seehofer	Reinhard Brandl	CSU	99,482	57.2	72,657	Ursula Engelen-Kefer
218	Munich North	Axel Berg	Johannes Singhammer	CSU	57,161	36.5	1,470	Axel Berg
219	Munich East	Herbert Frankenhauser	Herbert Frankenhauser	CSU	61,412	36.4	16,495	Claudia Tausend
220	Munich South	Peter Gauweiler	Peter Gauweiler	CSU	58,849	38.2	15,014	Christian Vorländer
221	Munich West/Centre	Hans-Peter Uhl	Hans-Peter Uhl	CSU	63,075	36.8	15,974	Roland Fischer
222	Munich Land	Georg Fahrenschon	Florian Hahn	CSU	83,856	45.7	48,051	Ingrid Lenz-Aktas
223	Rosenheim	Daniela Ludwig	Daniela Ludwig	CSU	82,305	51.5	59,264	Angelika Graf
224	Starnberg	Ilse Aigner	Ilse Aigner	CSU	101,261	54.0	71,610	Klaus Barthel
225	Traunstein	Peter Ramsauer	Peter Ramsauer	CSU	76,741	54.6	55,335	Bärbel Kofler
226	Weilheim	Alexander Dobrindt	Alexander Dobrindt	CSU	94,302	52.0	68,408	Angelica Dullinger
227	Deggendorf	Bartholomäus Kalb	Bartholomäus Kalb	CSU	49,398	52.9	34,062	Rita Hagl
228	Landshut	Wolfgang Götzer	Wolfgang Götzer	CSU	84,953	50.5	59,616	Harald Unfried
229	Passau	Andreas Scheuer	Andreas Scheuer	CSU	54,275	46.5	32,206	Max Stadler
230	Rottal-Inn	Max Straubinger	Max Straubinger	CSU	54,904	53.6	36,984	Florian Pronold
231	Straubing	Ernst Hinsken	Ernst Hinsken	CSU	61,572	55.4	36,650	Michael Adam
232	Amberg	Alois Karl	Alois Karl	CSU	71,148	47.3	40,561	Christian Beyer
233	Regensburg	Maria Eichhorn	Peter Aumer	CSU	75,653	44.7	40,446	Karl Söllner
234	Schwandorf	Klaus Hofbauer	Karl Holmeier	CSU	72,791	51.3	38,470	Marianne Schieder
235	Weiden	Albert Rupprecht	Albert Rupprecht	CSU	54,891	44.9	30,630	Werner Schieder
236	Bamberg	Thomas Silberhorn	Thomas Silberhorn	CSU	62,548	49.1	36,504	Andreas Schwarz
237	Bayreuth	Hartmut Koschyk	Hartmut Koschyk	CSU	58,848	50.9	34,928	Anette Kramme
238	Coburg	Hans Michelbach	Hans Michelbach	CSU	55,174	48.4	26,292	Carl-Christian Dressel
239	Hof	Hans-Peter Friedrich	Hans-Peter Friedrich	CSU	57,632	46.5	23,869	Petra Ernstberger
240	Kulmbach	Karl-Theodor zu Guttenberg	Karl-Theodor zu Guttenberg	CSU	86,658	68.1	67,941	Claus Stenglein
241	Ansbach	Josef Göppel	Josef Göppel	CSU	80,239	47.4	43,106	Helga Koch
242	Erlangen	Stefan Müller	Stefan Müller	CSU	60,685	45.1	28,416	Martina Stamm-Fibich
243	Fürth	Christian Schmidt	Christian Schmidt	CSU	76,897	43.3	32,392	Marlene Rupprecht
244	Nuremberg North	Dagmar Wöhrl	Dagmar Wöhrl	CSU	48,943	36.6	7,697	Günter Gloser
245	Nuremberg South	Renate Blank	Michael Frieser	CSU	47,519	38.6	10,360	Martin Burkert
246	Roth	Marlene Mortler	Marlene Mortler	CSU	75,280	44.6	34,816	Hannedore Nowotny
247	Aschaffenburg	Norbert Geis	Norbert Geis	CSU	56,491	42.7	31,348	Andreas Parr
248	Bad Kissingen	Eduard Lintner	Dorothee Bär	CSU	85,574	53.7	57,087	Susanne Kastner
249	Main-Spessart	Wolfgang Zöller	Wolfgang Zöller	CSU	75,542	52.4	46,883	Bernd Rützel
250	Schweinfurt	Michael Glos	Michael Glos	CSU	66,253	46.4	38,459	Frank Hofmann
251	Würzburg	Paul Lehrieder	Paul Lehrieder	CSU	73,800	44.0	34,745	Marion Reuther
252	Augsburg-Stadt	Christian Ruck	Christian Ruck	CSU	56,644	42.2	30,376	Heinz Paula
253	Augsburg-Land	Eduard Oswald	Eduard Oswald	CSU	92,508	53.0	65,081	Maria Hackl
254	Donau-Ries	Hans Raidel	Ulrich Lange	CSU	69,102	52.6	48,201	Gabriele Fograscher
255	Neu-Ulm	Georg Nüßlein	Georg Nüßlein	CSU	82,046	50.7	57,069	Karl-Heinz Brunner
256	Oberallgäu	Gerd Müller	Gerd Müller	CSU	83,181	53.0	63,088	Thomas Hartmann
257	Ostallgäu	Kurt Rossmanith	Stephan Stracke	CSU	85,429	51.1	62,570	Rolf Spitz

List members
SPD	FDP	GRÜNE	LINKE
Klaus Barthel; Martin Burkert; Petra Ernstberger; Gabriele Fograscher; Günter Gloser; Angelika Graf; Frank Hofmann; Susanne Kastner; Bärbel Kofler; Anette Kramme; Heinz Paula; Florian Pronold; Marlene Rupprecht; Marianne Schieder; Werner Schieder; Ewald Schurer	Rainer Erdel; Miriam Gruß; Sebastian Körber; Sabine Leutheusser-Schnarrenberger; Erwin Lotter; Horst Meierhofer; Jimmy Schulz; Marina Schuster; Joachim Spatz; Max Stadler; Rainer Stinner; Stephan Thomae; Daniel Volk	Ekin Deligöz; Hans-Josef Fell; Thomas Gambke; Anton Hofreiter; Uwe Kekeritz; Agnes Krumwiede; Jerzy Montag; Claudia Roth; Elisabeth Scharfenberg; Christine Scheel	Eva Bulling-Schröter; Klaus Ernst; Nicole Gohlke; Kornelia Möller; Alexander Süßmair; Harald Weinberg

=== Baden-Württemberg ===
Party	Constituency			Party list			Total seats	+/–
Party	Votes	%	Seats	Votes	%	Seats	Total seats	+/–
Christian Democratic Union (CDU)	2,307,250	42.5	37	1,874,481	34.4	0	37	+
Social Democratic Party (SPD)	1,285,617	23.7	1	1,051,198	19.3	14	15	−8
Free Democratic Party (FDP)	645,560	11.9	0	1,022,958	18.8	15	15	+6
Alliance 90/The Greens (GRÜNE)	694,760	12.8	0	755,648	13.9	11	11	+3
The Left (DIE LINKE)	345,551	6.4	0	389,637	7.2	6	6	+3
Pirate Party Germany	11,400	0.2	0	112,006	2.1	0	0	New
National Democratic Party	89,204	1.6	0	61,575	1.1	0	0	0
The Republicans	3,235	0.1	0	48,693	0.9	0	0	0
Human Environment Animal Protection Party	–	–	–	37,823	0.7	0	0	0
Ecological Democratic Party	13,187	0.2	0	24,525	0.5	0	0	New
Party of Bible-abiding Christians	8,588	0.2	0	24,430	0.4	0	0	0
Alliance for Germany	–	–	–	13,648	0.3	0	0	0
The Violets	1,023	0.0	0	12,593	0.2	0	0	New
Marxist–Leninist Party	3,007	0.1	0	3,640	0.1	0	0	0
German People's Union	–	–	–	3,473	0.1	0	0	New
Alliance of the Centre	–	–	–	2,889	0.1	0	0	New
Civil Rights Movement Solidarity	819	0.0	0	2,872	0.1	0	0	0
Others & Independents	15,148	0.3	0	–	–	–	0	–
Invalid/blank votes	105,893	–	–	88,153	–	–	–	–
Total	5,530,242	100	38	5,530,242	100	46	84	+8
Registered voters/turnout	7,633,818	72.4	–	7,633,818	72.4	–	–	–
Source: Federal Returning Officer

Constituency members
#	Constituency	Previous member	Elected member	Party	Votes	%	Margin	Runner-up
258	Stuttgart I	Johann-Henrich Krummacher	Stefan Kaufmann	CDU	48,518	34.4	6,402	Cem Özdemir
259	Stuttgart II	Ute Kumpf	Karin Maag	CDU	44,002	34.5	10,477	Ute Kumpf
260	Böblingen	Clemens Binninger	Clemens Binninger	CDU	82,344	45.1	45,794	Franziska Engehausen
261	Esslingen	Markus Grübel	Markus Grübel	CDU	53,829	43.5	18,433	Karin Roth
262	Nürtingen	Michael Hennrich	Michael Hennrich	CDU	66,116	43.3	29,206	Rainer Arnold
263	Göppingen	Klaus Riegert	Klaus Riegert	CDU	55,049	43.1	21,133	Sascha Binder
264	Waiblingen	Joachim Pfeiffer	Joachim Pfeiffer	CDU	69,575	43.0	25,504	Hermann Scheer
265	Ludwigsburg	Matthias Wissmann	Steffen Bilger	CDU	61,328	39.9	26,610	Jan Mönikes
266	Neckar-Zaber	Eberhard Gienger	Eberhard Gienger	CDU	70,606	42.0	31,176	Thorsten Majer
267	Heilbronn	Thomas Strobl	Thomas Strobl	CDU	73,308	44.2	31,824	Josip Juratovic
268	Schwäbisch Hall – Hohenlohe	Christian von Stetten	Christian von Stetten	CDU	65,474	43.3	32,868	Annette Sawade
269	Backnang – Schwäbisch Gmünd	Norbert Barthle	Norbert Barthle	CDU	55,492	44.7	24,590	Christian Lange
270	Aalen – Heidenheim	Georg Brunnhuber	Roderich Kiesewetter	CDU	70,599	45.0	30,648	Claudia Sünder
271	Karlsruhe-Stadt	Ingo Wellenreuther	Ingo Wellenreuther	CDU	53,872	38.1	16,027	Johannes Jung
272	Karlsruhe-Land	Axel Fischer	Axel Fischer	CDU	68,951	45.2	29,930	Ingo Juchler
273	Rastatt	Peter Götz	Peter Götz	CDU	68,652	48.0	35,373	Nicolette Kressl
274	Heidelberg	Karl A. Lamers	Karl A. Lamers	CDU	57,963	36.1	10,280	Lothar Binding
275	Mannheim	Lothar Mark	Egon Jüttner	CDU	48,137	36.56	8,292	Stefan Rebmann
276	Odenwald – Tauber	Kurt Segner	Alois Gerig	CDU	75,337	50.3	45,360	Gabriele Teichmann
277	Rhein-Neckar	Bernd Schmidbauer	Stephan Harbarth	CDU	59,755	42.3	24,329	Lars Castellucci
278	Bruchsal – Schwetzingen	Olav Gutting	Olav Gutting	CDU	64,659	46.9	32,134	Werner Henn
279	Pforzheim	Gunther Krichbaum	Gunther Krichbaum	CDU	62,224	40.7	27,280	Katja Mast
280	Calw	Hans-Joachim Fuchtel	Hans-Joachim Fuchtel	CDU	64,808	46.3	36,553	Saskia Esken
281	Freiburg	Gernot Erler	Gernot Erler	SPD	51,192	33.0	6,443	Daniel Sander
282	Lörrach – Müllheim	Marion Caspers-Merk	Armin Schuster	CDU	58,282	37.9	8,691	Jana Zirra
283	Emmendingen – Lahr	Peter Weiß	Peter Weiß	CDU	61,427	42.1	26,088	Johannes Fechner
284	Offenburg	Wolfgang Schäuble	Wolfgang Schäuble	CDU	65,336	47.2	38,284	Elvira Drobinski-Weiß
285	Rottweil – Tuttlingen	Volker Kauder	Volker Kauder	CDU	66,104	48.0	41,709	Ernst Burgbacher
286	Schwarzwald-Baar	Siegfried Kauder	Siegfried Kauder	CDU	54,172	47.4	32,337	Friedrich Scheerer
287	Konstanz	Andreas Jung	Andreas Jung	CDU	59,256	43.1	29,543	Peter Friedrich
288	Waldshut	Thomas Dörflinger	Thomas Dörflinger	CDU	50,967	41.5	15,941	Rita Schwarzelühr-Sutter
289	Reutlingen	Ernst-Reinhard Beck	Ernst-Reinhard Beck	CDU	60,753	42.7	29,358	Sebastian Weigle
290	Tübingen	Annette Widmann-Mauz	Annette Widmann-Mauz	CDU	55,188	38.9	24,628	Winfried Hermann
291	Ulm	Annette Schavan	Annette Schavan	CDU	67,798	42.8	31,923	Hilde Mattheis
292	Biberach	Franz Romer	Josef Rief	CDU	48,662	42.7	22,387	Martin Gerster
293	Bodensee	New seat	Lothar Riebsamen	CDU	54,169	45.0	30,582	Jochen Jehle
294	Ravensburg	New seat	Andreas Schockenhoff	CDU	56,931	44.8	34,401	Anne Jenter
295	Zollernalb – Sigmaringen	Thomas Bareiß	Thomas Bareiß	CDU	62,858	49.4	41,163	Angela Godawa

List members
FDP	SPD	GRÜNE	LINKE
Ernst Burgbacher; Heinz Golombeck; Birgit Homburger; Pascal Kober; Sibylle Laurischk; Harald Leibrecht; Michael Georg Link; Patrick Meinhardt; Dirk Niebel; Birgit Reinemund; Erik Schweickert; Werner Simmling; Judith Skudelny; Florian Toncar; Hartfrid Wolff	Rainer Arnold; Lothar Binding; Elvira Drobinski-Weiß; Peter Friedrich; Martin Gerster; Josip Juratovic; Nicolette Kressl; Ute Kumpf; Christian Lange; Katja Mast; Hilde Mattheis; Karin Roth; Hermann Scheer; Ute Vogt	Kerstin Andreae; Birgitt Bender; Alexander Bonde; Agnieszka Brugger; Winfried Hermann; Ingrid Hönlinger; Memet Kılıç; Sylvia Kotting-Uhl; Fritz Kuhn; Beate Müller-Gemmeke; Gerhard Schick	Karin Binder; Annette Groth; Heike Hänsel; Ulrich Maurer; Richard Pitterle; Michael Schlecht

=== Saarland ===
Party	Constituency			Party list			Total seats	+/–
Party	Votes	%	Seats	Votes	%	Seats	Total seats	+/–
Christian Democratic Union (CDU)	207,864	35.7	4	179,289	30.7	0	4	+1
Social Democratic Party (SPD)	182,340	31.3	0	144,464	24.7	2	2	−2
The Left (DIE LINKE)	107,088	18.4	0	123,880	21.2	2	2	0
Free Democratic Party (FDP)	42,107	7.2	0	69,427	11.9	1	1	0
Alliance 90/The Greens (GRÜNE)	30,671	5.3	0	39,550	6.8	1	1	+1
Family Party	4,102	0.7	0	8,912	1.5	0	0	0
Pirate Party Germany	–	–	–	8,620	1.5	0	0	New
National Democratic Party	8,033	1.4	0	7,399	1.3	0	0	0
Alliance 21/RRP	–	–	–	3,074	0.5	0	0	New
Marxist–Leninist Party	323	0.1	0	252	0.0	0	0	0
Invalid/blank votes	13,666	–	–	11,327	–	–	–	–
Total	596,194	100	4	596,194	100	6	10	0
Registered voters/turnout	808,554	73.7	–	808,554	73.7	–	–	–
Source: Federal Returning Officer

Constituency members
#	Constituency	Previous member	Elected member	Party	Votes	%	Margin	Runner-up
296	Saarbrücken	Elke Ferner	Anette Hübinger	CDU	45,748	31.8	2,011	Elke Ferner
297	Saarlouis	Ottmar Schreiner	Peter Altmaier	CDU	58,297	37.5	7,104	Ottmar Schreiner
298	St. Wendel	Rainer Tabillion	Nadine Schön	CDU	55,727	40.1	12,817	Rainer Tabillion
299	Homburg	Astrid Klug	Alexander Funk	CDU	48,092	33.4	3,592	Astrid Klug

List members
SPD	LINKE	FDP	GRÜNE
Elke Ferner; Ottmar Schreiner	Oskar Lafontaine; Thomas Lutze	Oliver Luksic	Markus Tressel

== Gallery ==
CDU-CSU vote

SPD vote

FDP vote

Linke vote

Grüne vote

PIRATEN vote
