= Burgbacher =

Burgbacher is a surname. Notable people with the surname include:

- Ernst Burgbacher (born 1949), German politician
- Fritz Burgbacher (1900–1978), German politician
