= Siegfried Kauder =

German Bundestag politician

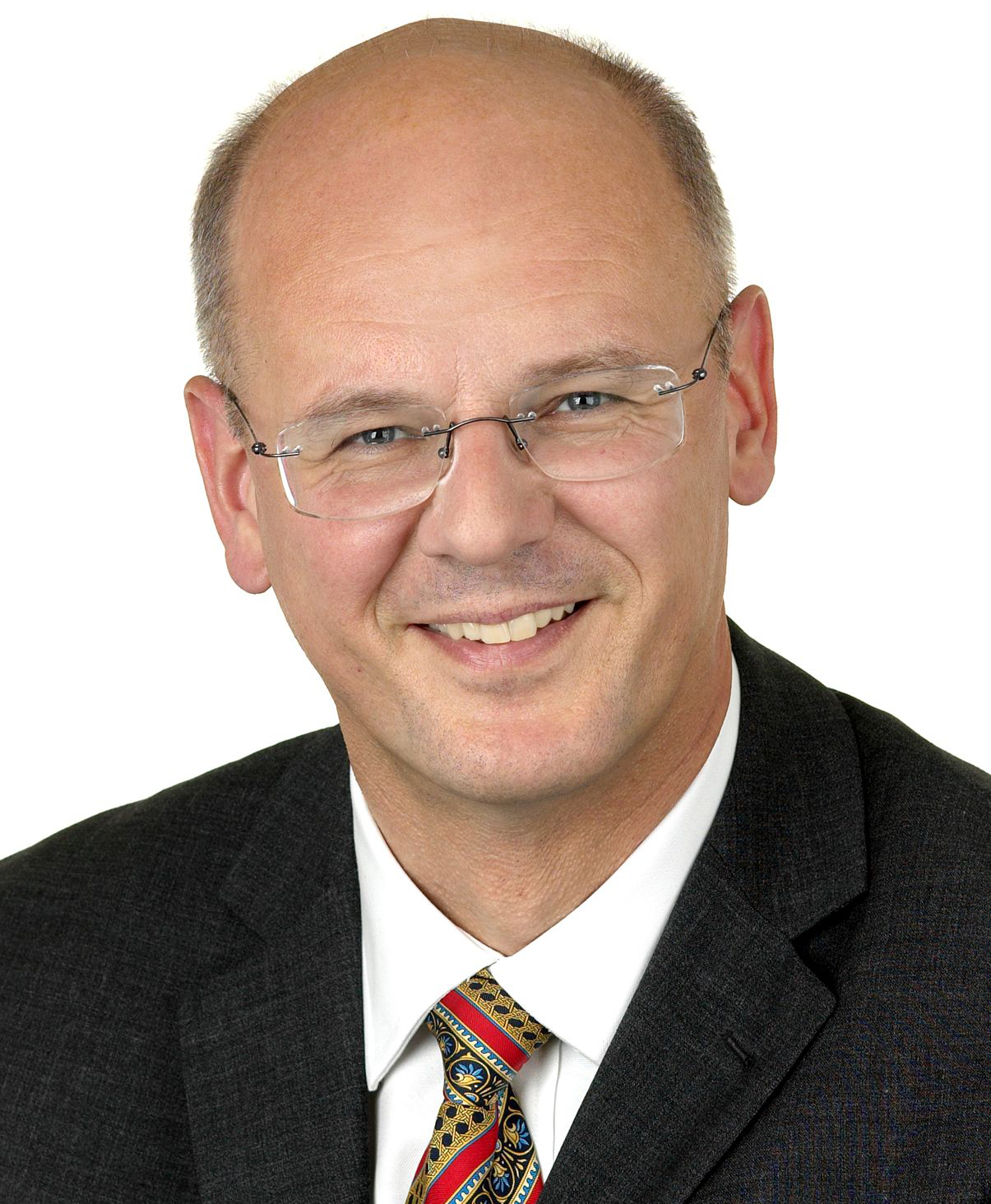
- Siegfried Kauder (2005)

Personal details
- Born: 20 November 1950 (age 75) Eigeltingen, West Germany
- Party: Independent politician formerly CDU
- Relatives: Volker Kauder (brother)
- Education: University of Freiburg

Siegfried Kauder (born 20 November 1950) is a German politician serving as a member of the Bundestag from 2002 to 2013. Kauder studied German law at University of Freiburg. He has served as chairman of the German Ausschuss für Recht und Verbraucherschutz from 2009 to 2013.

German politician Volker Kauder is a brother of Siegfried Kauder.
