= Greifswald – Demmin – Ostvorpommern =

Defunct federal electoral district of Germany

The constituency in Mecklenburg-Vorpommern.

Greifswald – Demmin – Ostvorpommern was a constituency in Mecklenburg-Vorpommern for the elections to the German Bundestag from 1990 to 2013.

== History ==
The constituency was formed after German reunification for the 1990 Bundestag elections under the name Greifswald - Wolgast - Demmin and received the constituency number 268.

The constituency was last contested at the 2009 election after which the state lost one Member of the Bundestag.

The area of the Greifswald – Demmin – Ostvorpommern constituency was divided into three new constituencies:

- Vorpommern-Rügen – Vorpommern-Greifswald I
- Mecklenburgische Seenplatte I – Vorpommern-Greifswald II
- Mecklenburg Lake District II - Rostock District III

== Geography ==
The constituency covered Greifswald, Demmin and Ostvorpommern district.

== Members ==
Election	Member	Party	%
1990	Ulrich Adam	CDU	52.6
1994	Ulrich Adam	CDU	49.0
1998	Ulrich Adam	CDU	39.5
2002	Ulrich Adam	CDU	38.1
2005	Ulrich Adam	CDU	37.2
2009	Matthias Lietz	CDU	38.0

== Election results ==
=== 2009 German federal election ===
Candidate	Political party	% of votes	% of party votes
Matthias Lietz	CDU	38.0	36.8
Peter Ritter	Die Linke	29.2	28.1
Katharina Feike	SPD	13.2	12.3
Christian Bartelt	FDP	8.6	10.4
Anne Klatt	Alliance 90 / The Greens	4.7	5.1
Michael Andrejewski	NPD	4.6	4.3
—	Pirates	—	2.4
—	REP	—	0.2
—	MLPD	—	0.2
Susanne Wiest	Independent	1.2	—
Jürgen van Raemdonck	Independent	0.5	—
