= Angelika Graf =

German politician (born 1947)

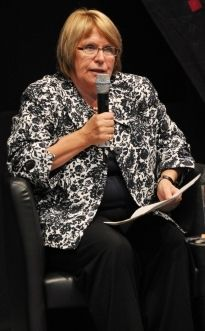
Angelika Graf at the German Seniors' Day (2009) in Leipzig

Angelika Graf, née Bachmann, (born May 10, 1947, in Munich) is a German politician. She is a member of the Social Democratic Party of Germany.

== Life and career ==
After graduating from Städtisches Luisengymnasium in Munich in 1966, Graf studied mathematics and physics at Technical University of Munich.

From 1971 to 1976, she worked as a programmer at Siemens AG and Papierwerke Waldhof-Aschaffenburg in Raubling. After the birth of her first daughter, she was a housewife until 1991. She then worked as a pedagogical employee at Diakonisches Werk in Rosenheim. From 1992 to 1993, she was also the publisher of a monthly county newspaper.

Angelika Graf is divorced and has two daughters.

== Party ==
Graf has been a member of the SPD since 1977; she has held various (honorary) offices since then. She was, among other things. Local and sub-district chairwoman, deputy district chairwoman of Upper Bavaria, local councillor in Raubling (district of Rosenheim), district councillor and currently city councillor in Rosenheim since 2008. She was also a board member of the Bavarian Working Group of Social Democratic Women (AsF). Graf has been a state board member of the Bayern-SPD since 2005 and was the state chairwoman of the AG 60 plus Bayern for many years; in 2007 she was elected to the federal board of the AG 60 plus. Since August 2011, she has been the federal chairwoman of the Arbeitsgemeinschaft SPD 60 plus. As chairwoman of the SPD Seniors, she criticized, among other things, the planned lowering of the pension level within the statutory pension insurance scheme.

== Member of Parliament ==
Angelika Graf was a Member of the German Bundestag from 1994 to 2013 – most recently as a member of the Committees on Health and Human Rights and Humanitarian Aid. In the 15th and 16th legislative periods (2002–2005 and 2008–2009), Graf was deputy spokesperson of the SPD parliamentary group for family, senior citizens, women and youth. Since the 16th legislative period (2005), she has been the SPD parliamentary group's deputy spokesperson for human rights and humanitarian aid. In the Committee on Health, she was the responsible rapporteur for drugs and addiction, prevention and Europe and thus also the SPD parliamentary group's Commissioner for Drugs.

Angelika Graf has always entered the German Bundestag via the state list Bavaria into the German Bundestag. Her constituency was Rosenheim.

== Civic engagement ==
- Chairwoman of the association "Gesicht Zeigen – Rosenheimer Bündnis gegen Rechts"
- Board member of HELP - Hilfe zur Selbsthilfe
- Member of the advisory board of the Treatment Center for Torture Victims.
- Member of IG Metall
- Member of the Workers' Welfare Association
- Member of the BUNDes
- Member of the association Frauenennotruf Rosenheim
- Member of the initiative Alternative living in old age

== Awards ==
- 2007: Bavarian Order of Merit
- 2015: Federal Cross of Merit on ribbon

== Literature ==
- Kürschners Volkshandbuch Deutscher Bundestag 15. Wahlperiode
