= Jörg Schindler =

German politician

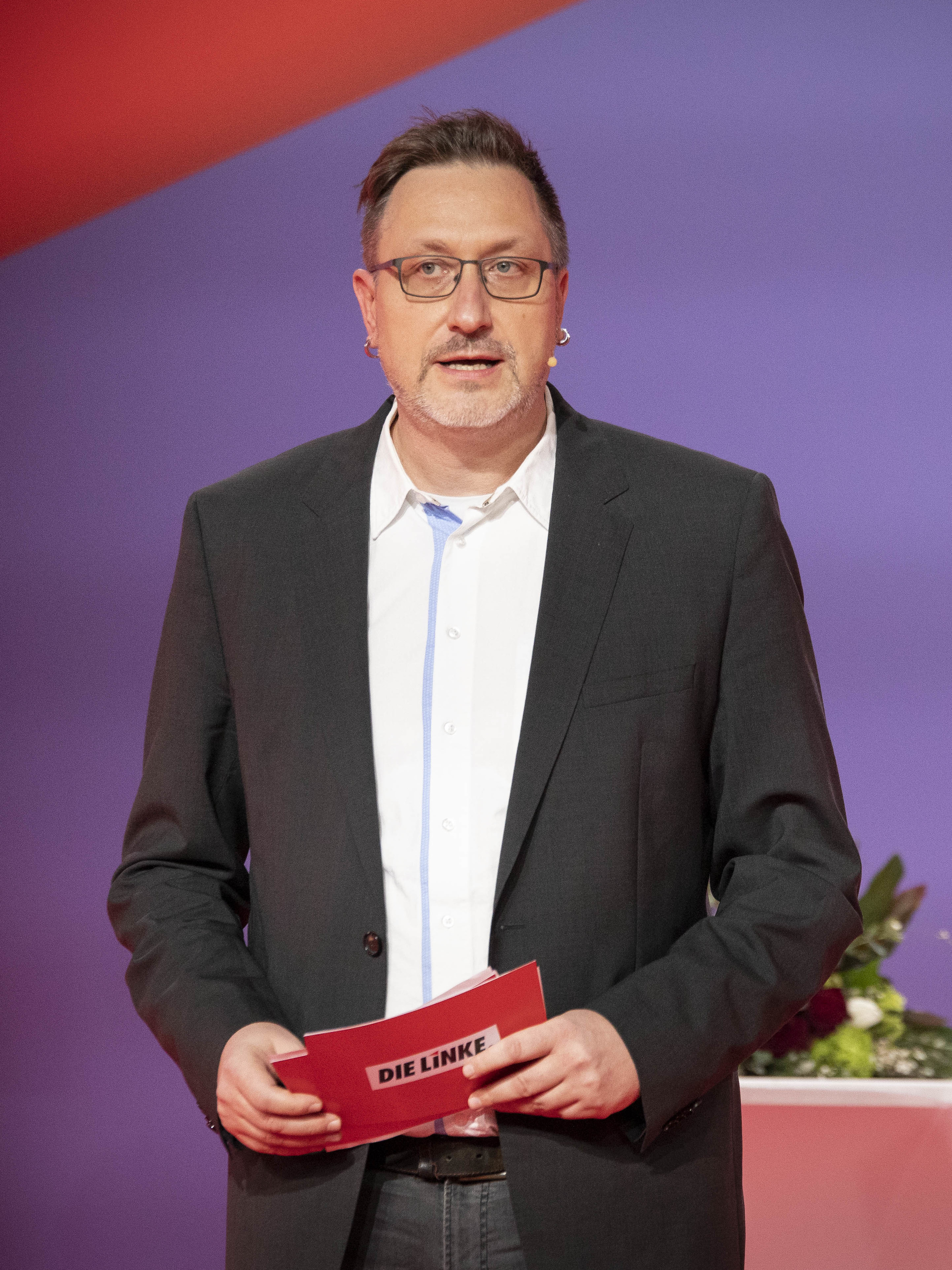
- Schindler in 2021

Federal Director of The Left
- Incumbent
- Assumed office 9 June 2018
- Preceded by: Matthias Höhn

Personal details
- Born: Jörg Schindler; 15 January 1972 (age 54) Borna, East Germany
- Party: The Left
- Education: University of Erlangen–Nuremberg

Jörg Schindler (born 15 January 1972) is a German politician and lawyer of The Left who is serving as federal director of the party since 2018.

== Legal career ==
Schindler was born in Borna near Leipzig, where he attended elementary and high school. He completed military service from 1990 to 1991 and began studying law at the University of Erlangen–Nuremberg in 1991, passing the first state examination in 1991. From 1996 to 1997 he further studied political science at FAU, then from 1997 to 1999 social sciences at the University of Duisburg-Essen. During his time in Duisburg, he completed a legal clerkship at the Higher Regional Court of Düsseldorf, district of Duisburg. He completed the second state examination in 1999.

Schindler has worked as a lawyer since 1999. He moved to Wittenberg in Saxony-Anhalt after gaining employment in a law form there. From 2001 to 2004, he was a partner in the local firm Rettler & Schindler. In 2011 he became a partner in the regional and later national law firm Schindler Elmenthaler Attorneys. Since 2017, he has been a specialist lawyer in labour rights.

== Political career ==
During his studies, Schindler was involved in the Socialist University Association (SHB) at the University of Erlangen–Nuremberg and in the student council of the law faculty. At the University of Duisburg-Essen he was a member of the Left List and speaker for higher education policy in the General Students' Committee. Schindler was a member of the youth association JungdemokratInnen/Junge Linke; from 1999 to 2002, he was a member of its federal executive board.

Schindler joined the Party of Democratic Socialism (PDS) in 2005. From 2007 to 2018, he was chairman of the Land Wittenberg branch of The Left and a member of the district council, where he chaired the party faction. From 2009 to 2014 he was a member of the city council of Wittenberg. He was deputy state chairman of The Left in Saxony-Anhalt until 2018.

Schindler stood for the Bundestag in the Dessau – Wittenberg constituency in the 2009, 2013, and 2017 federal elections, but failed to be elected each time. In 2009 and 2013 he placed second, winning 30.5% and 21.9% of votes respectively; in 2017 he placed third with 18.2%.

Within the party, Schindler is a member of the Socialist Left faction and was one of its federal speakers until 2018.

On 9 June 2018, Schindler was elected federal director of The Left at the Leipzig party congress. He narrowly defeated Frank Tempel for the position, winning 280 votes (48.4%) to Tempel's 277 (47.8%). He was re-elected to this position in February 2021.
