= Erich G. Fritz =

German politician

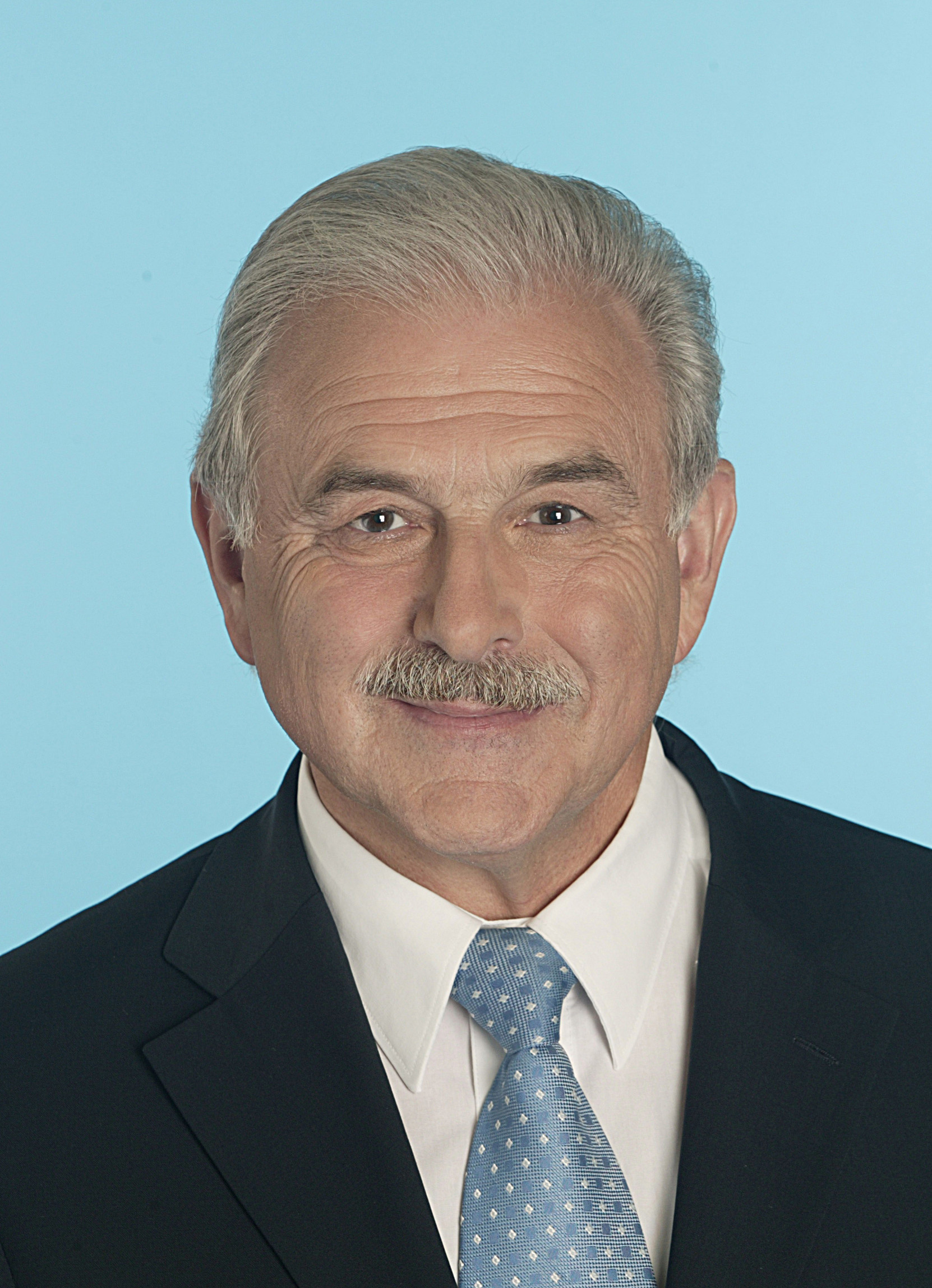
- Erich G. Fritz in 2005

Member of the Bundestag
- In office 1990–2013

Personal details
- Born: 9 December 1946 (age 79) Teisendorf, West Germany (now Germany)
- Party: CDU

Erich G. Fritz (born 9 December 1946) is a German politician of the Christian Democratic Union (CDU) and former member of the German Bundestag.

== Life ==
Fritz joined the CDU in 1976. From 1985 to 2009 he was chairman of the Dortmund CDU district association and from 1986 to 2012 he was a member of the Ruhr CDU district executive, most recently as deputy chairman. He is honorary chairman of the Dortmund CDU district association. From 1979 to 1990 Fritz was a member of Dortmund City Council. From 1990 to 2013 he was a member of the German Bundestag. From 1991 to 1998 he was deputy chairman of the Commission of Enquiry on the Protection of Humanity and the Environment and from 1994 to 2002 foreign trade spokesman for the CDU/CSU parliamentary group.
