= Ulrich Adam =

German politician and member of the CDU

Member of the Bundestag; for Greifswald – Demmin – Ostvorpommern
- In office 20 December 1990 – 27 October 2009
- Preceded by: Constituency established
- Succeeded by: Matthew Lietz

Personal details
- Born: 9 June 1950 (age 76) Teterow, East Germany
- Party: Christian Democratic Union
- Children: 2
- Education: University of Rostock; Freiberg University of Mining and Technology

Ulrich Adam (born 9 June 1950) is a German politician and member of the CDU. A mathematician and economist by profession, he was a directly elected member of the German Bundestag from 1990 to 2009. He didn't run for the elections in 2009. Ulrich Adam holds a Federal Cross of Merit.
