= Markus Grübel =

German politician (born 1959)

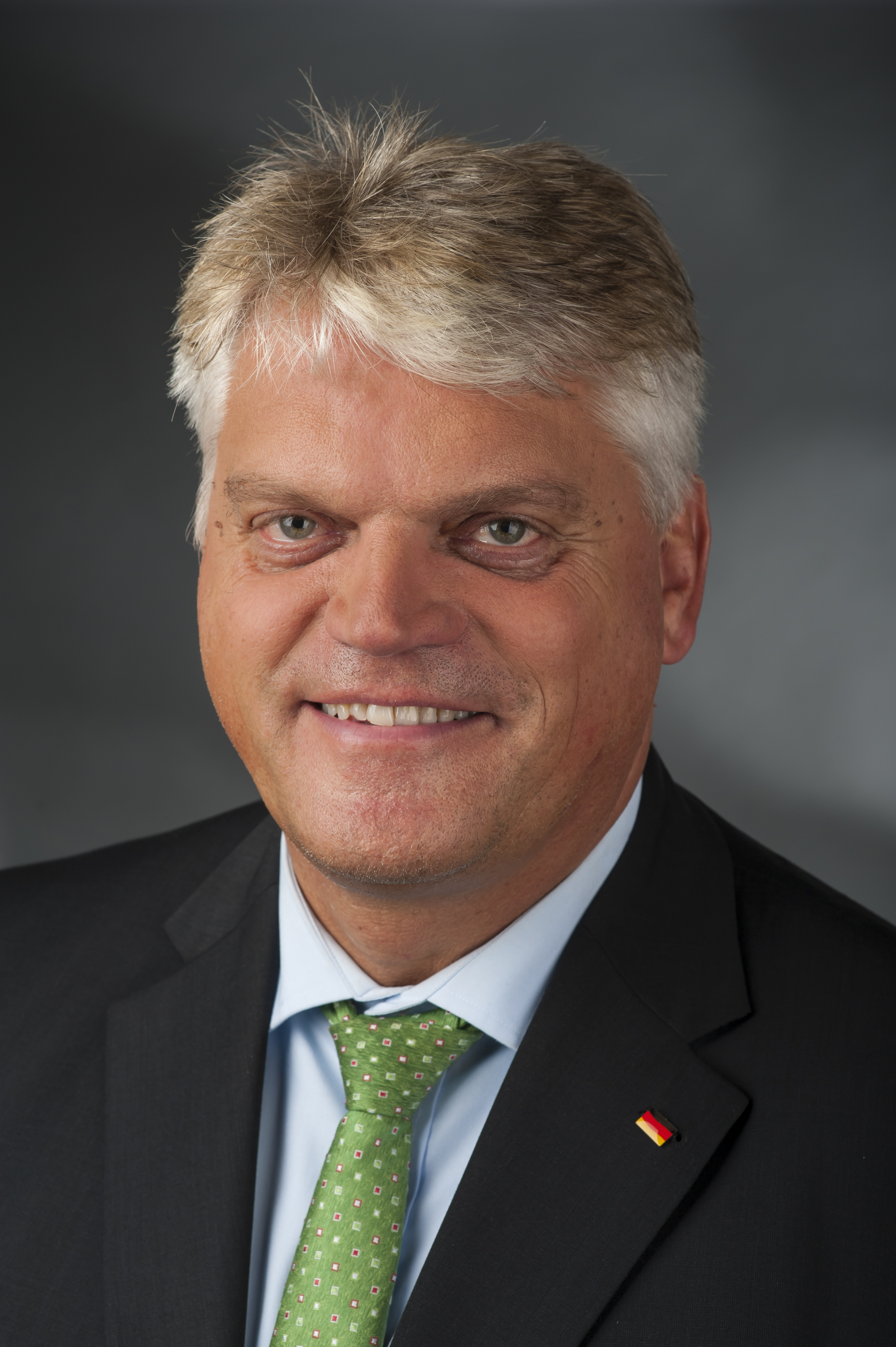
- Grübel in 2014

Member of the Bundestag; for Esslingen
- In office 17 October 2002 – 25 March 2025
- Preceded by: Siegmar Mosdorf
- Succeeded by: David Preisendanz

Personal details
- Born: 15 October 1959 (age 66) Esslingen am Neckar, West Germany (now Germany)
- Party: Christian Democratic Union

Markus Grübel (born 15 October 1959) is a German politician of the Christian Democratic Union (CDU) who served as a member of the Bundestag from the state of Baden-Württemberg from 2002 to 2025.

== Political career ==
Grübel first became a member of the Bundestag in the 2002 German federal election in electoral district Esslingen.

From 2002 until 2013, Grübel served on the Committee on Family Affairs, Senior Citizens, Women and Youth. In addition to his work in parliament, he chaired an independent inquiry into allegations of child abuse involving the Roman Catholic Diocese of Rottenburg-Stuttgart from 2011 until 2014.

In the negotiations to form a Grand Coalition of Chancellor Angela Merkel's Christian Democrats (CDU together with the Bavarian CSU) and the SPD following the 2013 federal elections, Grübel was part of the CDU/CSU delegation in the working group on families, women and equality, led by Annette Widmann-Mauz and Manuela Schwesig.

From 2013 until 2018, Grübel served as Parliamentary State Secretary at the Federal Ministry of Defence under the leadership of minister Ursula von der Leyen.

From 2018 to 2021, Grübel was a member of the Committee on Foreign Affairs and the Subcommittee on Civilian Crisis Prevention. From 2021 elections, he served on the Defence Committee. He was also a member of the German delegation to the Franco-German Parliamentary Assembly from 2019 to 2025.

In addition to his parliamentary mandate, Grübel served as Commissioner for Global Freedom of Religion at the Federal Ministry for Economic Cooperation and Development in the government of Chancellor Angela Merkel from 2018 to 2021.

In September 2023, Grübel announced that he would not stand in the 2025 federal elections but instead resign from active politics by the end of the parliamentary term.

== Other activities ==
- Center for International Peace Operations (ZIF), Member of the Supervisory Board

== Political positions ==
In June 2017, Grübel voted against Germany's introduction of same-sex marriage.

Ahead of the 2021 national elections, Grübel endorsed Markus Söder as the Christian Democrats' joint candidate to succeed Chancellor Angela Merkel.
