= Diana Golze =

German politician (born 1975)

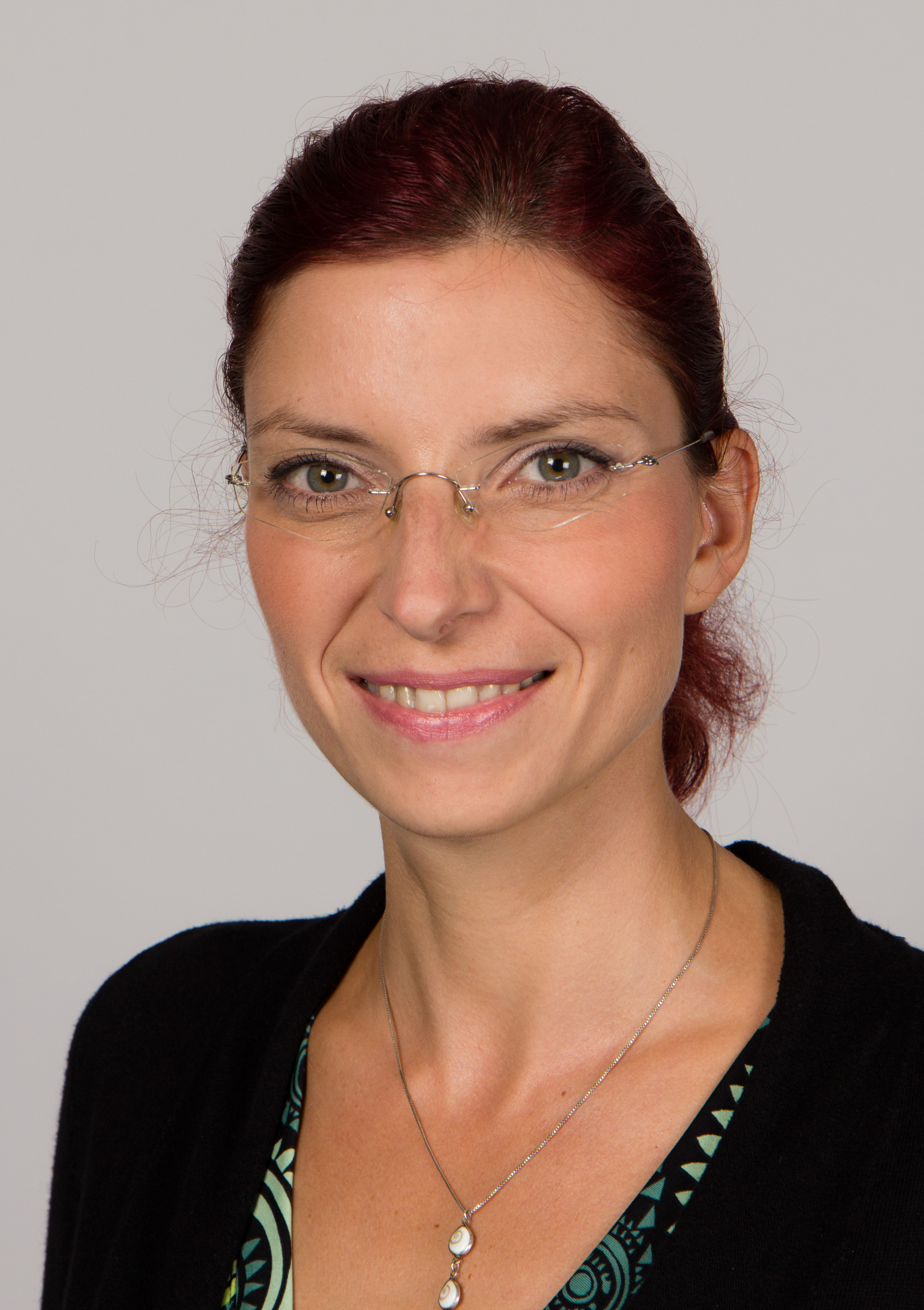

Member of the German Bundestag
- In office 2005–2014

Health Minister of Brandenburg
- Incumbent
- Assumed office 2018

Personal details
- Born: Diana Hertha Golze; 18 June 1975 (age 50) Schwedt, Germany
- Party: The Left
- Education: Technische Universität Berlin
- Occupation: Politician

Diana Hertha Golze (née Gnorski; born 18 June 1975) is a German politician from Die Linke. She was a Member of the Bundestag from 2005 to 2014.

== Career ==
She resigned from the Bundestag on 6 November 2014.

She was Health Minister of Brandenburg until 2018.
