= Neubrandenburg – Mecklenburg-Strelitz – Uecker-Randow =

Defunct federal electoral district of Germany

The constituency in Mecklenburg-Vorpommern.

Neubrandenburg – Mecklenburg-Strelitz – Uecker-Randow was a constituency in Mecklenburg-Vorpommern for the elections to the German Bundestag from 2002 to 2013.

== History ==
The constituency was formed for the 2002 federal elections and bore the constituency number 17. The constituency was last contested at the 2009 election after which the state lost one Member of the Bundestag.

The area of the Greifswald – Demmin – Ostvorpommern constituency was divided into two new constituencies:

- Mecklenburgische Seenplatte I – Vorpommern-Greifswald II
- Mecklenburg Lake District II - Rostock District III

== Geography ==
The constituency covered the city of Neubrandenburg and the districts of Mecklenburg-Strelitz and Uecker-Randow.

== Members ==
Election	Member	Party	%
2002	Götz-Peter Lohmann	SPD	37.8
2005	Susanne Jaffke	CDU	31.3
2009	Christoph Poland	CDU	33.0

== Election results ==
=== 2009 German federal election ===
Candidate	Political party	% of first votes	% of second votes
Christoph Poland	CDU	33.0	33.4
Torsten Koplin	Die Linke	32.8	31:3
Dennis Pinzke	SPD	17.0	15.6
Dietrich Eckard Krause	FDP	6.9	8.5
Tino Müller	NPD	5.0	4.6
Nicolas Mantseris	Alliance 90 / The Greens	3.9	4.1
Michael Waldow	Independent	1.0	-
Volkmar Munz	Independent	0.4	-
-	Pirates	-	2.1
-	MLPD	-	0.2
-	REP	-	0.2
