= Max Stadler =

German politician

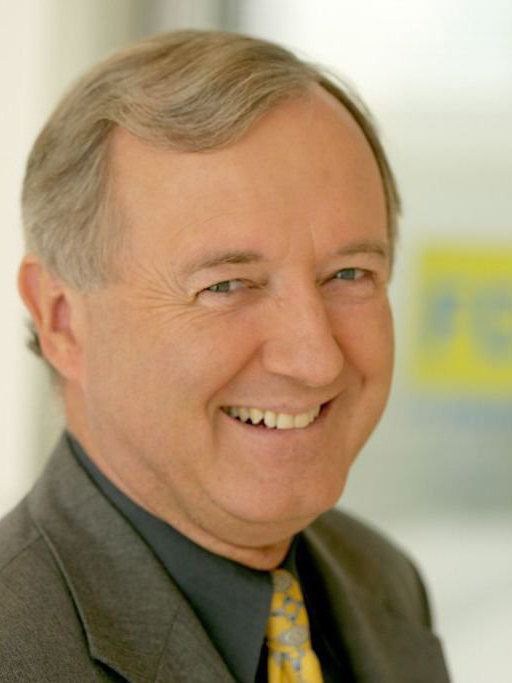

Max Josef Stadler (23 March 1949 in Passau – 12 May 2013 in Thyrnau) was a German politician. He was a Free Democratic Party member of the Bundestag from 1994 until his death.
