= Franz Obermeier =

Franz Obermeier (born February 13, 1967 in Kelheim, Germany) is a German Romance philologist and librarian.

== Life and Work ==
Obermeier studied Romance philology and Slavic studies at the University of Regensburg as well as in Trento and Rome. He qualified as a French translator in 1991 and obtained his Master's degree in 1992. In 1994, he received his doctorate from the University of Regensburg. In the same year he began training as a librarian at the library of Freiburg University. He passed the qualifying examination in 1996 at the University of Applied Sciences for Library and Information Science in Cologne (Fachhochschule für Bibliotheks- und Dokumentationswesen). From 1997 to 1999 he was the scientific librarian at Eichstätt-Ingolstadt University. In 1999, he moved to the Kiel University Library, where he is responsible for managing numerous subject areas. He is also a conference interpreter for the meetings of the International Federation of Library Associations and Institutions. Obermeier's work focuses primarily on early European travel accounts from and about Brazil and the region around La Plata (Argentina, Uruguay, and Paraguay), and he publishes critical scholarly editions of these works. He is also a researcher at the CERES Research Center, which studies the Spanish Renaissance in its broader European context.

== Selected publications ==
- Obermeier, Franz (1995). Französische Brasilienreiseberichte im 17. Jahrhundert. Claude d’Abbeville: Histoire de la mission, 1614, Yves d’Evreux: Suitte de l’histoire, 1615 [French Accounts of Travels in Brazil in the Seventeenth Century]. Abhandlungen zur Sprache und Literatur. Vol. 83. Bonn: Romanistischer Verlag. ISBN 3-86143-035-5.
- Obermeier, Franz; Kramer, Roswitha (2000). Brasilien in Illustrationen des 16. Jahrhunderts [Brazil in Sixteenth-Century Illustrations]. Americana Eystettensia, Series B. Vol. 11. Frankfurt am Main: Vervuert. ISBN 3-89354-960-9.
- Obermeier, Franz (2002). "Hans Stadens Wahrhaftige Historia 1557 und die Literatur der Zeit" [Hans Staden's True History (1557) and the Literature of His Time]. Wolfenbütteler Notizen zur Buchgeschichte. 27 (1): 43–80.
- Obermeier, Franz (2003). "Die Illustrationen zu Schmidels Südamerikareisebericht von 1567 bis heute" [The Illustrations of Schmidel's Account of His South American Travels, from 1567 to the Present]. Jahresbericht des Historischen Vereins für Straubing und Umgebung. 105: 119–163.
- Obermeier, Franz, ed. (2005). Fronteras e identidades – identidades e fronteiras. Civilización y barbarie – sertão e litoral [Frontiers and Identities – Identities and Frontiers. Civilization and Barbarism – Hinterland and Coast]. Frankfurt am Main: Lang. ISBN 3-631-52877-9.
- Staden, Hans (2007). Obermeier, Franz (ed.). Warhaftige Historia. Zwei Reisen nach Brasilien (1548–1555) [True History: Two Voyages to Brazil (1548–1555)] (Critical ed.). Kiel: Westensee-Verlag. ISBN 3-931368-70-X.
- Obermeier, Franz; Schiffner, Manfred, eds. (2008). Die Warhaftige Historia – das erste Brasilienbuch. Akten des Wolfhager Kongresses zu 450 Jahren Hans-Staden-Rezeption [The True History – The First Book about Brazil. Proceedings of the Wolfhagen Conference Marking 450 Years of the Reception of Hans Staden]. Fontes Americanae. Vol. 2. Kiel: Westensee-Verlag. ISBN 3-931368-68-8.
- Schmidel, Ulrich (2008). Obermeier, Franz (ed.). Reise in die La Plata-Gegend (1534–1554) [Journey to the Río de la Plata Region (1534–1554)] (Critical ed.). Kiel: Westensee-Verlag. ISBN 978-3-931368-16-6.
- Schmidel, Ulrich (2008). Obermeier, Franz (ed.). Reise in die La Plata-Gegend 1534–1554. Das Stuttgarter Autograph in moderner Fassung [Journey to the Río de la Plata Region, 1534–1554: The Stuttgart Autograph Manuscript in a Modernized Version]. Straubinger Hefte. Vol. 58. Straubing: Johannes-Turmair-Gymnasium.
- Obermeier, Franz (2009). "Die französischen Aufklärer und Brasilien" [The French Enlightenment Thinkers and Brazil]. Literaturwissenschaftliches Jahrbuch. 50: 81–113.
- Obermeier, Franz (2010). "Wie und mit welchen Mitteln erforschte man südamerikanische Indianersprachen?" [How and with What Means Were South American Indigenous Languages Studied?]. Wolfenbütteler Notizen zur Buchgeschichte. 35 (2): 167–183.
- Obermeier, Franz (2011). "Ulrich Schmidels (Ulrico Schmidls) Reisebuch über die La Plata-Region und seine heutige Bedeutung" [Ulrich Schmidel's (Ulrico Schmidl's) Travel Account of the Río de la Plata Region and Its Significance Today]. Jahresbericht des Historischen Vereins für Straubing und Umgebung. 113: 157–188.
- Deutschsprachige Brasilienliteratur 1500–1900. Bibliografisches Verzeichnis [German-Language Literature on Brazil, 1500–1900: A Bibliography]. With additional contributors. São Leopoldo: Oikos. 2011. ISBN 978-85-7843-158-7.
- Evreux, Yves d' (2012). Obermeier, Franz (ed.). Voyage au nord du Brésil (1615) [Voyage to Northern Brazil (1615)] (Critical ed.). Kiel: Westensee-Verlag. ISBN 3-931368-43-2.
- Obermeier, Franz (2012). "Reisebericht-Illustrationen und Lektüremöglichkeiten in der frühen lateinamerikanischen Kolonialzeit" [Illustrations in Travel Accounts and Ways of Reading Them in the Early Latin American Colonial Period]. In Luber, Susanne (ed.). Reise-Bilder. Beiträge zur Visualisierung von Reiseerfahrung [Travel Images: Contributions to the Visualization of Travel Experiences]. Eutiner Forschungen. Vol. 6. Eutiner Landesbibliothek. pp. 13–48. ISBN 978-3-939643-07-4.
- Obermeier, Franz (2018). "Brasilien in Halle. Ein hessischer Brasilienreisender in der Sammlung der Marienbibliothek: Hans Stadens Warhaftige Historia von 1557" [Brazil in Halle: A Hessian Traveler to Brazil in the Collection of the Marienbibliothek: Hans Staden's True History of 1557]. In Eckle, Jutta (ed.). Erlebte Fremde. Reiseberichte aus der Frühen Neuzeit in der Marienbibliothek zu Halle an der Saale [Encounters with Foreign Lands: Early Modern Travel Accounts in the Marienbibliothek in Halle an der Saale]. Kostbarkeiten und Raritäten aus der alten Büchersammlung. Vol. 5. Halle an der Saale: Freundeskreis der Marienbibliothek zu Halle e. V. pp. 13–32. ISBN 978-3-00-058806-8.
