= Klaus Brandner (politician) =

German politician and member of the SPD

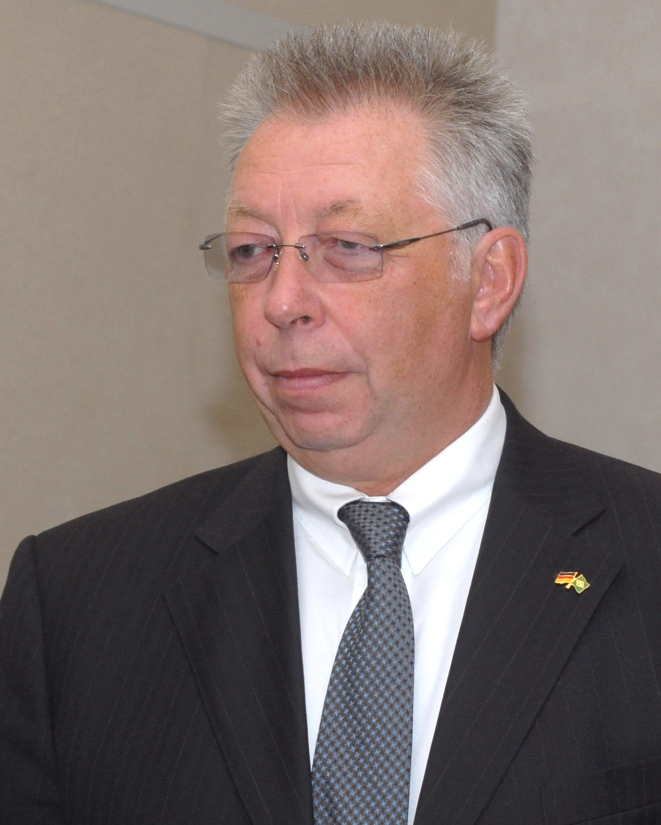
Klaus Brandner

Klaus Brandner (born 13 January 1949 in Kalletal) is a German politician and member of the SPD.
