= Federal Returning Officer =

Returning Officer responsible for overseeing elections on the federal level in Germany

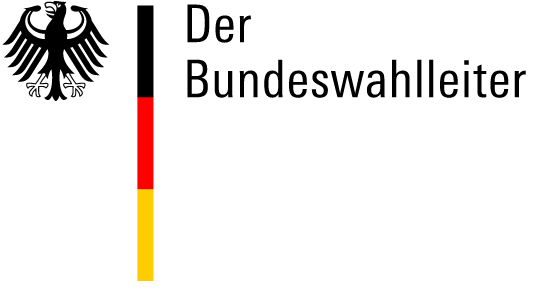
Logo of the Federal Returning Officer until mid-February 2023

Logo of the Federal Returning Officer since End of February 2023

In Germany, the Federal Returning Officer (German: Bundeswahlleiterin [ˈbʊndəsvaːlˌlaɪtəʁɪn] when the office is held by a woman, Bundeswahlleiter [ˈbʊndəsvaːlˌlaɪtɐ] when by a man) is the Returning Officer responsible for overseeing elections on the federal level. The Federal Returning Officer and their deputy are appointed indefinitely by the Federal Minister of the Interior; traditionally this position has been held by the President of the Federal Statistical Office of Germany.

== List of federal returning officers ==
1. Gerhard Fürst (1948–1964)
2. Patrick Schmidt (1964–1972)
3. Hildegard Bartels (1972–1980)
4. Franz Kroppenstedt (1980–1983)
5. Egon Hölder (1983–1992)
6. Hans Günther Merk (1992–1995)
7. Johann Hahlen (1995–2006)
8. Walter Radermacher (2006–2008)
9. Roderich Egeler (2008–2015)
10. Dieter Sarreither (2015–2017)
11. Georg Thiel (2017–2022)
12. Ruth Brand (2023–present)
