= Ernst Burgbacher =

German politician and member of the FDP

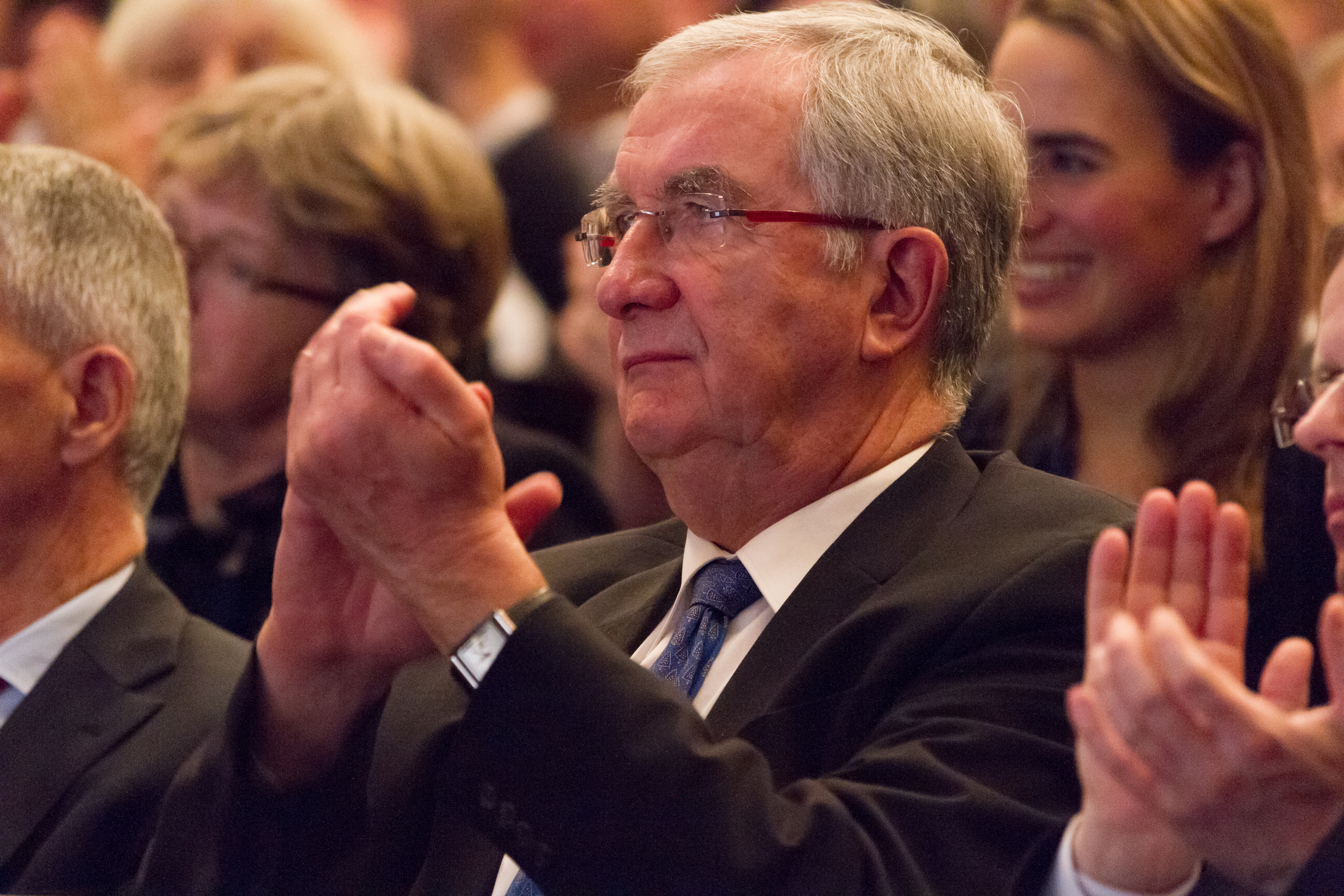
Ernst Burgbacher 2015

Ernst Burgbacher (born 28 May 1949 in Trossingen) is a German politician and member of the FDP.
