= List of members of the 13th Bundestag =

13th Bundestag
←	12th	14th	→
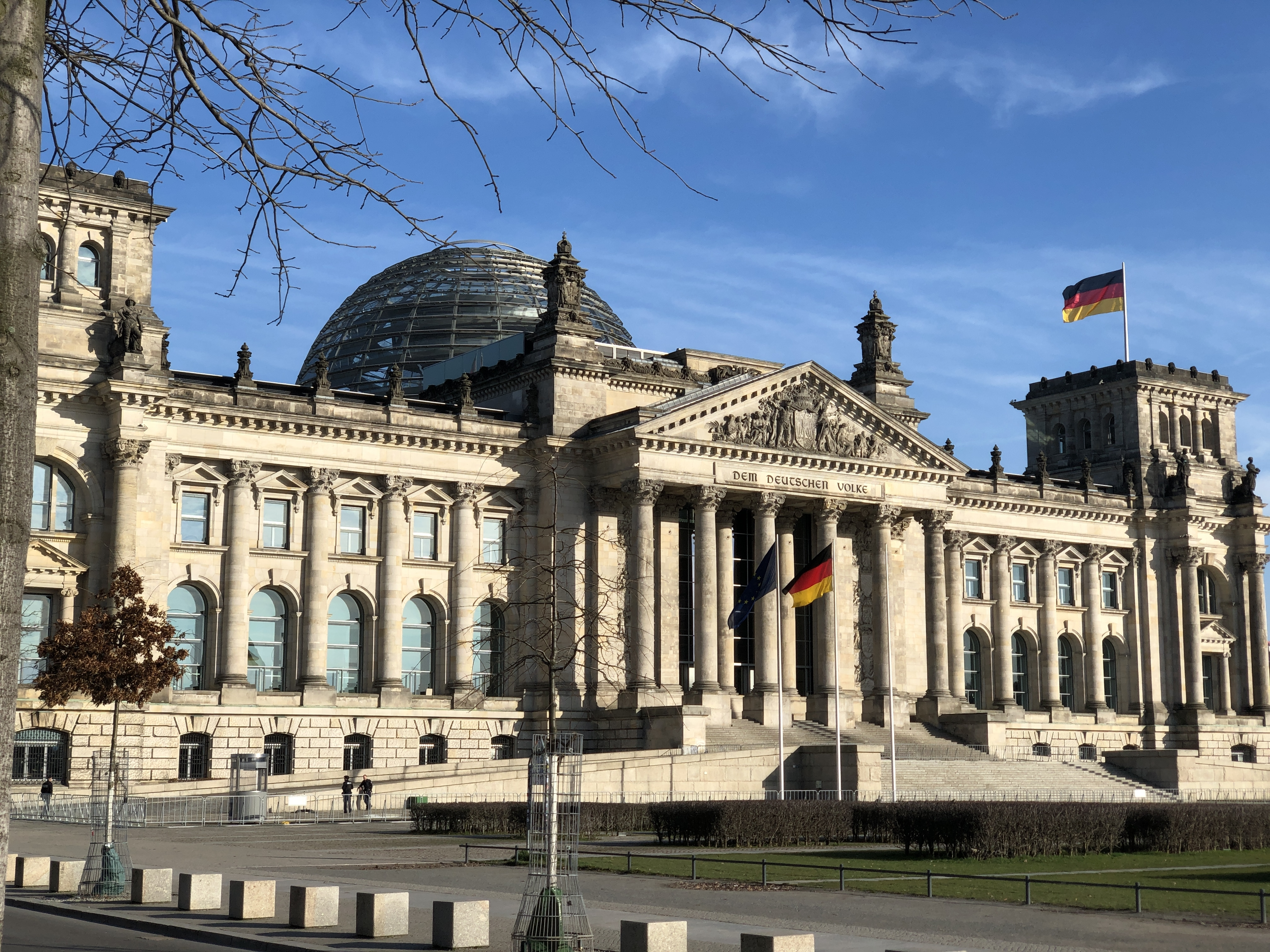
- Reichstag building in 2020

Overview
- Legislative body: Bundestag
- Jurisdiction: Germany
- Meeting place: Reichstag building, Berlin

Bundestag
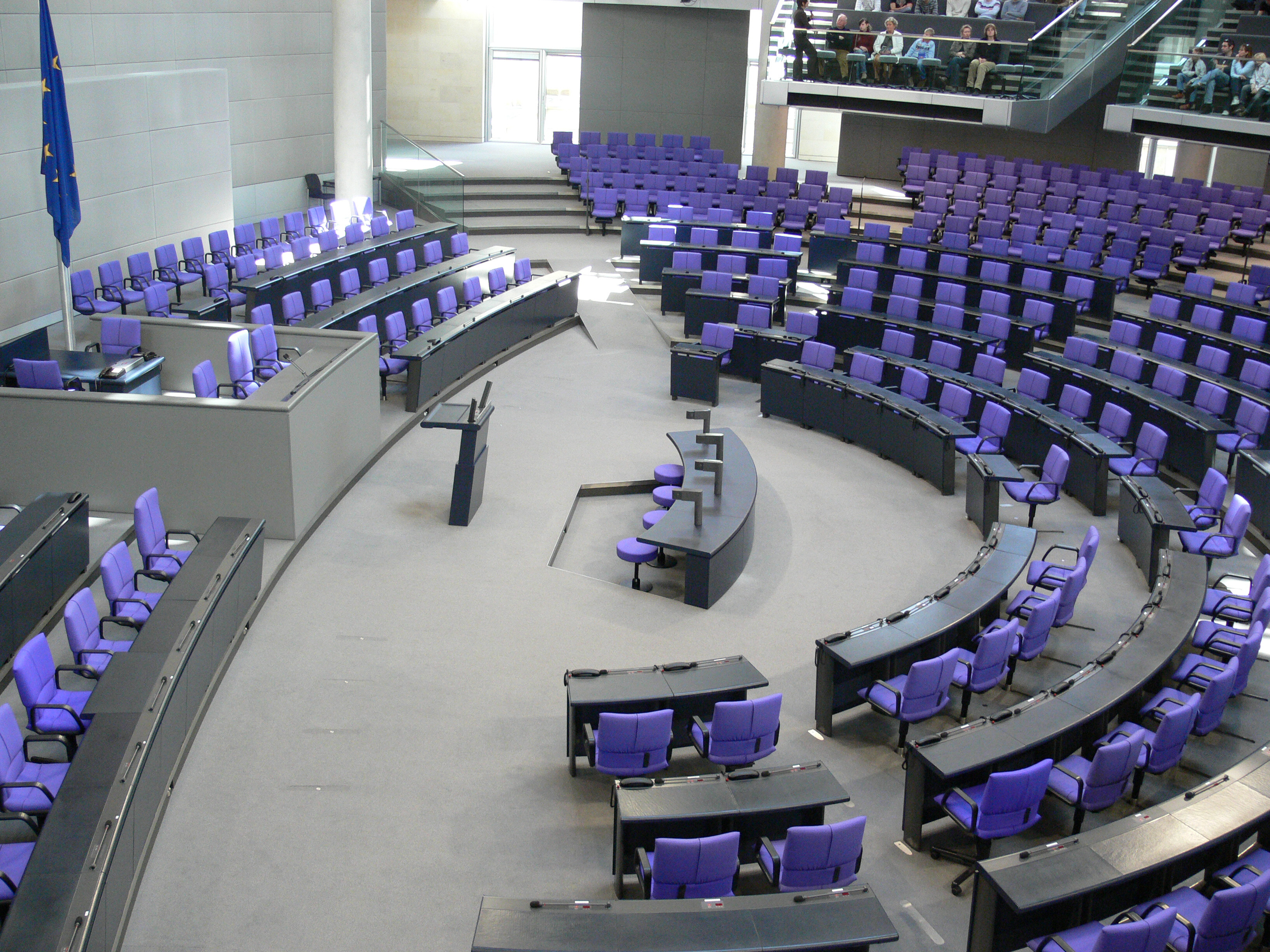
- Members: 672

This is a list of members of the 13th Bundestag – the lower house of parliament of the Federal Republic of Germany, whose members were in office from 1994 until 1998.

== Summary ==
This summary includes changes in the numbers of the five caucuses (CDU/CSU, SPD, Greens, FDP, Party of Democratic Socialism):

Time	Reason of change	CDU/CSU	SPD	Greens	FDP	PDS	Others	Total number
1994	First meeting	294	252	49	47	30		672
8 October 1996	Kurt Neumann leaves the SPD caucus and becomes unaffiliated	294	251	49	47	30	1	672
17 December 1996	Vera Lengsfeld leaves the Greens caucus and become members of CDU/CSU	295	251	48	47	30	1	672

== Members ==
State	No.	Constituency	Member	Party
Schleswig-Holstein	1	Flensburg – Schleswig	Wolfgang Börnsen	CDU
Schleswig-Holstein	2	Nordfriesland – Dithmarschen-Nord	Peter Harry Carstensen	CDU
Schleswig-Holstein	3	Steinburg – Dithmarschen-Süd	Dietrich Austermann	CDU
Schleswig-Holstein	4	Rendsburg-Eckernförde	Gerhard Stoltenberg	CDU
Schleswig-Holstein	5	Kiel	Norbert Gansel (Note: Norbert Gansel resigned on 16 June 1997.)	SPD
Schleswig-Holstein	6	Plön – Neumünster	Helmut Lamp	CDU
Schleswig-Holstein	7	Pinneberg	Gert Willner	CDU
Schleswig-Holstein	8	Segeberg – Stormarn-Nord	Peter Kurt Würzbach	CDU
Schleswig-Holstein	9	Ostholstein	Rolf Olderog	CDU
Schleswig-Holstein	10	Herzogtum Lauenburg – Stormarn-Süd	Michael von Schmude	CDU
Schleswig-Holstein	11	Lübeck	Reinhold Hiller	SPD
Schleswig-Holstein	List		Lieselott Blunck	SPD
Schleswig-Holstein	List		Eckart Kuhlwein	SPD
Schleswig-Holstein	List		Ulrike Mehl	SPD
Schleswig-Holstein	List		Manfred Opel	SPD
Schleswig-Holstein	List		Cornelie Sonntag-Wolgast	SPD
Schleswig-Holstein	List		Antje-Marie Steen	SPD
Schleswig-Holstein	List		Franz Thönnes	SPD
Schleswig-Holstein	List		Wolfgang Wodarg	SPD
Schleswig-Holstein	List		Michael Bürsch (Note: Michael Bürsch took office on 17 June 1997, to succeed Norbert Gansel.)	SPD
Schleswig-Holstein	List		Angelika Beer	Greens
Schleswig-Holstein	List		Rainder Steenblock (Note: Rainder Steenblock resigned on 1 June 1996.)	Greens
Schleswig-Holstein	List		Egbert Nitsch (Note: Egbert Nitsch took office on 4 June 1996, to succeed Rainder Steenblock.)	Greens
Schleswig-Holstein	List		Jürgen Koppelin	FDP
Schleswig-Holstein	List		Edzard Schmidt-Jortzig	FDP
Schleswig-Holstein	List		Anke Eymer	CDU
Hamburg	12	Hamburg-Mitte	Freimut Duve	SPD
Hamburg	13	Hamburg-Altona	Marliese Dobberthien	SPD
Hamburg	14	Hamburg-Eimsbüttel	Angelika Mertens	SPD
Hamburg	15	Hamburg-Nord	Dirk Fischer	CDU
Hamburg	16	Hamburg-Wandsbek	Peter Zumkley	SPD
Hamburg	17	Hamburg-Bergedorf	Rolf Niese	SPD
Hamburg	18	Hamburg-Harburg	Hans-Ulrich Klose	SPD
Hamburg	List		Klaus Francke	CDU
Hamburg	List		Volker Rühe	CDU
Hamburg	List		Birgit Schnieber-Jastram	CDU
Hamburg	List		Gunnar Uldall	CDU
Hamburg	List		Amke Dietert-Scheuer	Greens
Hamburg	List		Kristin Heyne	Greens
Hamburg	List		Rainer Funke	FDP
Lower Saxony	19	Aurich – Emden	Jann-Peter Janssen	SPD
Lower Saxony	20	Unterems	Rudolf Seiters	CDU
Lower Saxony	21	Friesland – Wilhelmshaven	Gabriele Iwersen	SPD
Lower Saxony	22	Oldenburg – Ammerland	Dietmar Schütz	SPD
Lower Saxony	23	Delmenhorst – Wesermarsch – Oldenburg-Land	Margitta Terborg	SPD
Lower Saxony	24	Cuxhaven	Annette Faße	SPD
Lower Saxony	25	Stade – Rotenburg I	Horst Eylmann	CDU
Lower Saxony	26	Mittelems	Hermann Kues	CDU
Lower Saxony	27	Cloppenburg – Vechta	Manfred Carstens	CDU
Lower Saxony	28	Diepholz	Walter Link	CDU
Lower Saxony	29	Verden – Osterholz	Arne Börnsen (Note: Arne Börnsen resigned on 6 January 1998.)	SPD
Lower Saxony	30	Soltau-Fallingbostel – Rotenburg II	Heinz-Günter Bargfrede	CDU
Lower Saxony	31	Lüneburg – Lüchow-Dannenberg	Kurt-Dieter Grill	CDU
Lower Saxony	32	Osnabrück-Land	Reinhard von Schorlemer	CDU
Lower Saxony	33	Stadt Osnabrück	Karl-Heinz Hornhues	CDU
Lower Saxony	34	Nienburg – Schaumburg	Ernst Kastning	SPD
Lower Saxony	35	Harburg	Rudolf Meyer	CDU
Lower Saxony	36	Stadt Hannover I	Gerd Andres	SPD
Lower Saxony	37	Stadt Hannover II	Edelgard Bulmahn	SPD
Lower Saxony	38	Hannover-Land I	Dietmar Kansy	CDU
Lower Saxony	39	Celle – Uelzen	Klaus-Jürgen Hedrich	CDU
Lower Saxony	40	Gifhorn – Peine	Engelbert Nelle	CDU
Lower Saxony	41	Hameln-Pyrmont – Holzminden	Brigitte Schulte	SPD
Lower Saxony	42	Hannover-Land II	Herbert Lattmann	CDU
Lower Saxony	43	Hildesheim	Hermann Rappe	SPD
Lower Saxony	44	Salzgitter – Wolfenbüttel	Wilhelm Schmidt	SPD
Lower Saxony	45	Braunschweig	Leyla Onur	SPD
Lower Saxony	46	Helmstedt – Wolfsburg	Heinrich-Wilhelm Ronsöhr	CDU
Lower Saxony	47	Goslar	Jürgen Sikora	CDU
Lower Saxony	48	Northeim – Osterode	Edith Niehuis	SPD
Lower Saxony	49	Göttingen	Rita Süssmuth	CDU
Lower Saxony	List		Arne Fuhrmann	SPD
Lower Saxony	List		Monika Ganseforth	SPD
Lower Saxony	List		Günter Graf	SPD
Lower Saxony	List		Ingomar Hauchler	SPD
Lower Saxony	List		Monika Heubaum	SPD
Lower Saxony	List		Detlev von Larcher	SPD
Lower Saxony	List		Volker Neumann	SPD
Lower Saxony	List		Kurt Palis	SPD
Lower Saxony	List		Reinhold Robbe	SPD
Lower Saxony	List		Horst Schild	SPD
Lower Saxony	List		Ernst Schwanhold	SPD
Lower Saxony	List		Bodo Seidenthal	SPD
Lower Saxony	List		Peter Struck	SPD
Lower Saxony	List		Inge Wettig-Danielmeier	SPD
Lower Saxony	List		Eva Folta (Note: Eva Folta took office on 9 January 1998, to succeed Arne Börnsen.)	SPD
Lower Saxony	List		Gertrud Dempwolf	CDU
Lower Saxony	List		Heinz Dieter Eßmann	CDU
Lower Saxony	List		Carl-Detlev Freiherr von Hammerstein	CDU
Lower Saxony	List		Eckart von Klaeden	CDU
Lower Saxony	List		Eva-Maria Kors	CDU
Lower Saxony	List		Thomas Kossendey	CDU
Lower Saxony	List		Erich Maaß	CDU
Lower Saxony	List		Friedbert Pflüger	CDU
Lower Saxony	List		Marlies Pretzlaff	CDU
Lower Saxony	List		Erika Schuchardt	CDU
Lower Saxony	List		Wilfried Seibel	CDU
Lower Saxony	List		Günther Bredehorn	FDP
Lower Saxony	List		Walter Hirche	FDP
Lower Saxony	List		Detlef Kleinert	FDP
Lower Saxony	List		Lisa Peters	FDP
Lower Saxony	List		Carl-Ludwig Thiele	FDP
Lower Saxony	List		Gila Altmann	Greens
Lower Saxony	List		Manuel Kiper	Greens
Lower Saxony	List		Helmut Lippelt	Greens
Lower Saxony	List		Ursula Schönberger	Greens
Lower Saxony	List		Waltraud Schoppe	Greens
Lower Saxony	List		Rolf Köhne	PDS
Bremen	50	Bremen-Ost	Volker Kröning	SPD
Bremen	51	Bremen-West	Konrad Kunick	SPD
Bremen	52	Bremerhaven – Bremen-Nord	Ilse Janz	SPD
Bremen	List		Bernd Neumann	CDU
Bremen	List		Michael Teiser	CDU
Bremen	List		Marieluise Beck	Greens
North Rhine-Westphalia	53	Aachen	Armin Laschet	CDU
North Rhine-Westphalia	54	Kreis Aachen	Achim Großmann	SPD
North Rhine-Westphalia	55	Heinsberg	Karl H. Fell (Note: Karl H. Fell died on 5 December 1996.)	CDU
North Rhine-Westphalia	56	Düren	Thomas Rachel	CDU
North Rhine-Westphalia	57	Erftkreis I	Klaus Lennartz	SPD
North Rhine-Westphalia	58	Euskirchen – Erftkreis II	Wolf Bauer	CDU
North Rhine-Westphalia	59	Cologne I	Volkmar Schultz	SPD
North Rhine-Westphalia	60	Cologne II	Heribert Blens	CDU
North Rhine-Westphalia	61	Cologne III	Konrad Gilges	SPD
North Rhine-Westphalia	62	Cologne IV	Günter Oesinghaus	SPD
North Rhine-Westphalia	63	Bonn	Editha Limbach	CDU
North Rhine-Westphalia	64	Rhein-Sieg-Kreis I	Andreas Krautscheid	CDU
North Rhine-Westphalia	65	Rhein-Sieg-Kreis II	Norbert Röttgen	CDU
North Rhine-Westphalia	66	Oberbergischer Kreis	Horst Waffenschmidt	CDU
North Rhine-Westphalia	67	Rheinisch-Bergischer Kreis I	Wolfgang Bosbach	CDU
North Rhine-Westphalia	68	Leverkusen – Rheinisch-Bergischer Kreis II	Johannes Singer	SPD
North Rhine-Westphalia	69	Wuppertal I	Rudolf Dreßler	SPD
North Rhine-Westphalia	70	Wuppertal II	Willfried Penner	SPD
North Rhine-Westphalia	71	Solingen – Remscheid	Hans-Werner Bertl	SPD
North Rhine-Westphalia	72	Mettmann I	Joseph-Theodor Blank	CDU
North Rhine-Westphalia	73	Mettmann II	Heinz Schemken	CDU
North Rhine-Westphalia	74	Düsseldorf I	Wolfgang Schulhoff	CDU
North Rhine-Westphalia	75	Düsseldorf II	Volker Jung	SPD
North Rhine-Westphalia	76	Neuss I	Bertold Mathias Reinartz	CDU
North Rhine-Westphalia	77	Neuss II	Willy Wimmer	CDU
North Rhine-Westphalia	78	Mönchengladbach	Hans-Wilhelm Pesch	CDU
North Rhine-Westphalia	79	Krefeld	Dieter Pützhofen	CDU
North Rhine-Westphalia	80	Viersen	Julius Louven	CDU
North Rhine-Westphalia	81	Kleve	Ronald Pofalla	CDU
North Rhine-Westphalia	82	Wesel I	Uwe Jens	SPD
North Rhine-Westphalia	83	Wesel II	Peter Enders	SPD
North Rhine-Westphalia	84	Duisburg I	Helmut Wieczorek	SPD
North Rhine-Westphalia	85	Duisburg II	Günter Schluckebier	SPD
North Rhine-Westphalia	86	Oberhausen	Dieter Schanz	SPD
North Rhine-Westphalia	87	Mülheim	Dieter Schloten	SPD
North Rhine-Westphalia	88	Essen I	Otto Reschke	SPD
North Rhine-Westphalia	89	Essen II	Rolf Hempelmann	SPD
North Rhine-Westphalia	90	Essen III	Ingrid Becker-Inglau	SPD
North Rhine-Westphalia	91	Recklinghausen I	Jochen Welt	SPD
North Rhine-Westphalia	92	Recklinghausen II – Borken I	Waltraud Lehn	SPD
North Rhine-Westphalia	93	Gelsenkirchen I	Joachim Poß	SPD
North Rhine-Westphalia	94	Gelsenkirchen II – Recklinghausen III	Norbert Formanski	SPD
North Rhine-Westphalia	95	Bottrop – Recklinghausen IV	Dieter Grasedieck	SPD
North Rhine-Westphalia	96	Borken II	Elke Wülfing	CDU
North Rhine-Westphalia	97	Coesfeld – Steinfurt I	Werner Lensing	CDU
North Rhine-Westphalia	98	Steinfurt II	Reinhold Hemker	SPD
North Rhine-Westphalia	99	Münster	Ruprecht Polenz	CDU
North Rhine-Westphalia	100	Warendorf	Peter Paziorek	CDU
North Rhine-Westphalia	101	Gütersloh	Hubert Deittert	CDU
North Rhine-Westphalia	102	Bielefeld	Günter Rixe	SPD
North Rhine-Westphalia	103	Herford	Wolfgang Spanier	SPD
North Rhine-Westphalia	104	Minden-Lübbecke	Lothar Ibrügger	SPD
North Rhine-Westphalia	105	Lippe I	Karl Hermann Haack	SPD
North Rhine-Westphalia	106	Höxter – Lippe II	Meinolf Michels	CDU
North Rhine-Westphalia	107	Paderborn	Friedhelm Ost	CDU
North Rhine-Westphalia	108	Hagen	Dietmar Thieser (Note: Dietmar Thieser resigned on 19 December 1996.)	SPD
North Rhine-Westphalia	109	Ennepe-Ruhr-Kreis I	Adolf Ostertag	SPD
North Rhine-Westphalia	110	Bochum I	Klaus Hasenfratz	SPD
North Rhine-Westphalia	111	Bochum II – Ennepe-Ruhr-Kreis II	Klaus Lohmann	SPD
North Rhine-Westphalia	112	Herne	Dieter Maaß	SPD
North Rhine-Westphalia	113	Dortmund I	Hans-Eberhard Urbaniak	SPD
North Rhine-Westphalia	114	Dortmund II	Wolfgang Weiermann	SPD
North Rhine-Westphalia	115	Dortmund III	Ulla Burchardt	SPD
North Rhine-Westphalia	116	Unna I	Ulrich Böhme (Note: Ulrich Böhme died on 6 February 1996.)	SPD
North Rhine-Westphalia	117	Hamm – Unna II	Dieter Wiefelspütz	SPD
North Rhine-Westphalia	118	Soest	Jürgen Augustinowitz	CDU
North Rhine-Westphalia	119	Hochsauerlandkreis	Friedrich Merz	CDU
North Rhine-Westphalia	120	Siegen-Wittgenstein I	Paul Breuer	CDU
North Rhine-Westphalia	121	Olpe – Siegen-Wittgenstein II	Hartmut Schauerte	CDU
North Rhine-Westphalia	122	Märkischer Kreis I	Cornelia Yzer	CDU
North Rhine-Westphalia	123	Märkischer Kreis II	Lisa Seuster	SPD
North Rhine-Westphalia	List		Norbert Blüm	CDU
North Rhine-Westphalia	List		Jochen Borchert	CDU
North Rhine-Westphalia	List		Renate Diemers	CDU
North Rhine-Westphalia	List		Ilse Falk	CDU
North Rhine-Westphalia	List		Leni Fischer	CDU
North Rhine-Westphalia	List		Erich G. Fritz	CDU
North Rhine-Westphalia	List		Reinhard Göhner	CDU
North Rhine-Westphalia	List		Hermann Gröhe	CDU
North Rhine-Westphalia	List		Horst Günther	CDU
North Rhine-Westphalia	List		Peter Hintze	CDU
North Rhine-Westphalia	List		Hubert Hüppe	CDU
North Rhine-Westphalia	List		Steffen Kampeter	CDU
North Rhine-Westphalia	List		Irmgard Karwatzki	CDU
North Rhine-Westphalia	List		Norbert Königshofen	CDU
North Rhine-Westphalia	List		Karl Lamers	CDU
North Rhine-Westphalia	List		Norbert Lammert	CDU
North Rhine-Westphalia	List		Karl-Josef Laumann	CDU
North Rhine-Westphalia	List		Wolfgang Lohmann	CDU
North Rhine-Westphalia	List		Claire Marienfeld (Note: Claire Marienfeld resigned on 28 April 1995.)	CDU
North Rhine-Westphalia	List		Erwin Marschewski	CDU
North Rhine-Westphalia	List		Beatrix Philipp	CDU
North Rhine-Westphalia	List		Winfried Pinger	CDU
North Rhine-Westphalia	List		Jürgen Rüttgers	CDU
North Rhine-Westphalia	List		Andreas Schmidt	CDU
North Rhine-Westphalia	List		Hans Peter Schmitz	CDU
North Rhine-Westphalia	List		Wolfgang Vogt	CDU
North Rhine-Westphalia	List		Bernd Wilz	CDU
North Rhine-Westphalia	List		Wolfgang Meckelburg (Note: Wolfgang Meckelburg took office on 2 May 1995, to succeed Claire Marienfeld.)	CDU
North Rhine-Westphalia	List		Detlef Helling (Note: Detlef Helling took office on 11 December 1996, to succeed Karl H. Fell.)	CDU
North Rhine-Westphalia	List		Hans Berger	SPD
North Rhine-Westphalia	List		Hans Gottfried Bernrath (Note: Hans Gottfried Bernrath resigned on 31 December 1994.)	SPD
North Rhine-Westphalia	List		Friedhelm Julius Beucher	SPD
North Rhine-Westphalia	List		Anni Brandt-Elsweier	SPD
North Rhine-Westphalia	List		Wolf-Michael Catenhusen	SPD
North Rhine-Westphalia	List		Dagmar Freitag	SPD
North Rhine-Westphalia	List		Anke Fuchs	SPD
North Rhine-Westphalia	List		Katrin Fuchs	SPD
North Rhine-Westphalia	List		Dieter Heistermann	SPD
North Rhine-Westphalia	List		Barbara Hendricks	SPD
North Rhine-Westphalia	List		Hans-Peter Kemper	SPD
North Rhine-Westphalia	List		Marianne Klappert	SPD
North Rhine-Westphalia	List		Ingrid Matthäus-Maier	SPD
North Rhine-Westphalia	List		Michael Müller	SPD
North Rhine-Westphalia	List		Rudolf Purps	SPD
North Rhine-Westphalia	List		Margot von Renesse	SPD
North Rhine-Westphalia	List		Bernd Scheelen	SPD
North Rhine-Westphalia	List		Dagmar Schmidt	SPD
North Rhine-Westphalia	List		Ulla Schmidt	SPD
North Rhine-Westphalia	List		Regina Schmidt-Zadel	SPD
North Rhine-Westphalia	List		Walter Schöler	SPD
North Rhine-Westphalia	List		Reinhard Schultz	SPD
North Rhine-Westphalia	List		Angelica Schwall-Düren	SPD
North Rhine-Westphalia	List		Josef Vosen (Note: Josef Vosen resigned on 3 June 1998.)	SPD
North Rhine-Westphalia	List		Hildegard Wester	SPD
North Rhine-Westphalia	List		Christoph Zöpel	SPD
North Rhine-Westphalia	List		Eike Hovermann (Note: Eike Hovermann took office on 13 January 1995, to succeed Hans Gottfried Bernrath.)	SPD
North Rhine-Westphalia	List		Uwe Göllner (Note: Uwe Göllner took office on 12 February 1996, to succeed Ulrich Böhme.)	SPD
North Rhine-Westphalia	List		Helga Kühn-Mengel (Note: Helga Kühn-Mengel took office on 23 December 1996, to succeed Dietmar Thieser.)	SPD
North Rhine-Westphalia	List		Gerd Bauer (Note: Gerd Bauer took office on 3 June 1998, to succeed Josef Vosen.)	SPD
North Rhine-Westphalia	List		Ina Albowitz	FDP
North Rhine-Westphalia	List		Jörg van Essen	FDP
North Rhine-Westphalia	List		Paul Friedhoff	FDP
North Rhine-Westphalia	List		Hans-Dietrich Genscher	FDP
North Rhine-Westphalia	List		Burkhard Hirsch	FDP
North Rhine-Westphalia	List		Werner Hoyer	FDP
North Rhine-Westphalia	List		Karl-Hans Laermann	FDP
North Rhine-Westphalia	List		Otto Graf Lambsdorff	FDP
North Rhine-Westphalia	List		Heinz Lanfermann (Note: Heinz Lanfermann resigned on 7 February 1996.)	FDP
North Rhine-Westphalia	List		Jürgen Möllemann	FDP
North Rhine-Westphalia	List		Günther Friedrich Nolting	FDP
North Rhine-Westphalia	List		Irmgard Schwaetzer	FDP
North Rhine-Westphalia	List		Guido Westerwelle (Note: Guido Westerwelle took office on 8 February 1996, to succeed Heinz Lanfermann.)	FDP
North Rhine-Westphalia	List		Volker Beck	Greens
North Rhine-Westphalia	List		Annelie Buntenbach	Greens
North Rhine-Westphalia	List		Michaele Hustedt	Greens
North Rhine-Westphalia	List		Kerstin Müller	Greens
North Rhine-Westphalia	List		Winfried Nachtwei	Greens
North Rhine-Westphalia	List		Christa Nickels	Greens
North Rhine-Westphalia	List		Simone Probst	Greens
North Rhine-Westphalia	List		Irmingard Schewe-Gerigk	Greens
North Rhine-Westphalia	List		Wolfgang Schmitt	Greens
North Rhine-Westphalia	List		Manfred Such	Greens
North Rhine-Westphalia	List		Ludger Volmer	Greens
North Rhine-Westphalia	List		Ulla Jelpke	PDS
Hesse	124	Waldeck	Alfred Hartenbach	SPD
Hesse	125	Kassel	Gerhard Rübenkönig	SPD
Hesse	126	Werra-Meißner	Joachim Tappe	SPD
Hesse	127	Schwalm-Eder	Gerd Höfer	SPD
Hesse	128	Hersfeld	Berthold Wittich	SPD
Hesse	129	Marburg	Brigitte Lange	SPD
Hesse	130	Lahn-Dill	Erika Lotz	SPD
Hesse	131	Gießen	Erwin Horn	SPD
Hesse	132	Fulda	Alfred Dregger	CDU
Hesse	133	Hochtaunus	Bärbel Sothmann	CDU
Hesse	134	Wetterau	Christian Schwarz-Schilling	CDU
Hesse	135	Rheingau-Taunus – Limburg	Michael Jung	CDU
Hesse	136	Wiesbaden	Hannelore Rönsch	CDU
Hesse	137	Hanau	Manfred Kanther	CDU
Hesse	138	Frankfurt am Main I – Main-Taunus	Heinz Riesenhuber	CDU
Hesse	139	Frankfurt am Main II	Joachim Gres	CDU
Hesse	140	Frankfurt am Main III	Erika Steinbach	CDU
Hesse	141	Groß-Gerau	Heinz-Adolf Hörsken (Note: Heinz-Adolf Hörsken died on 23 February 1996.)	CDU
Hesse	142	Offenbach	Klaus Lippold	CDU
Hesse	143	Darmstadt	Andreas Storm	CDU
Hesse	144	Odenwald	Wolfgang Steiger	CDU
Hesse	145	Bergstraße	Michael Meister	CDU
Hesse	List		Barbara Imhof	SPD
Hesse	List		Dorothea Marx	SPD
Hesse	List		Bernd Reuter	SPD
Hesse	List		Gudrun Schaich-Walch	SPD
Hesse	List		Werner Schuster	SPD
Hesse	List		Dietrich Sperling	SPD
Hesse	List		Adelheid Tröscher	SPD
Hesse	List		Karsten Voigt	SPD
Hesse	List		Norbert Wieczorek	SPD
Hesse	List		Heidemarie Wieczorek-Zeul	SPD
Hesse	List		Uta Zapf	SPD
Hesse	List		Anneliese Augustin	CDU
Hesse	List		Friedrich Bohl	CDU
Hesse	List		Wilhelm Dietzel	CDU
Hesse	List		Christian Lenzer	CDU
Hesse	List		Adolf Roth	CDU
Hesse	List		Bernd Siebert	CDU
Hesse	List		Helmut Heiderich (Note: Helmut Heiderich took office on 26 February 1996, to succeed Heinz-Adolf Hörsken.)	CDU
Hesse	List		Matthias Berninger	Greens
Hesse	List		Joschka Fischer	Greens
Hesse	List		Marina Steindor	Greens
Hesse	List		Antje Vollmer	Greens
Hesse	List		Margareta Wolf	Greens
Hesse	List		Gisela Babel	FDP
Hesse	List		Wolfgang Gerhardt	FDP
Hesse	List		Heinrich Kolb	FDP
Hesse	List		Hermann Otto Solms	FDP
Hesse	List		Gerhard Zwerenz	PDS
Rhineland-Palatinate	146	Neuwied	Ulrich Schmalz	CDU
Rhineland-Palatinate	147	Ahrweiler	Wilhelm Josef Sebastian	CDU
Rhineland-Palatinate	148	Koblenz	Karl-Heinz Scherhag	CDU
Rhineland-Palatinate	149	Cochem	Peter Bleser	CDU
Rhineland-Palatinate	150	Kreuznach	Fritz Rudolf Körper	SPD
Rhineland-Palatinate	151	Bitburg	Peter Rauen	CDU
Rhineland-Palatinate	152	Trier	Franz Peter Basten	CDU
Rhineland-Palatinate	153	Montabaur	Joachim Hörster	CDU
Rhineland-Palatinate	154	Mainz	Hans-Otto Wilhelm	CDU
Rhineland-Palatinate	155	Worms	Klaus Hagemann	SPD
Rhineland-Palatinate	156	Frankenthal	Horst Sielaff	SPD
Rhineland-Palatinate	157	Ludwigshafen	Helmut Kohl	CDU
Rhineland-Palatinate	158	Neustadt – Speyer	Norbert Schindler	CDU
Rhineland-Palatinate	159	Kaiserslautern	Hansjörg Schäfer	SPD
Rhineland-Palatinate	160	Pirmasens	Klaus-Dieter Uelhoff	CDU
Rhineland-Palatinate	161	Südpfalz	Heiner Geißler	CDU
Rhineland-Palatinate	List		Doris Barnett	SPD
Rhineland-Palatinate	List		Karl Diller	SPD
Rhineland-Palatinate	List		Ludwig Eich	SPD
Rhineland-Palatinate	List		Elke Leonhard	SPD
Rhineland-Palatinate	List		Ursula Mogg	SPD
Rhineland-Palatinate	List		Eckhart Pick	SPD
Rhineland-Palatinate	List		Rudolf Scharping	SPD
Rhineland-Palatinate	List		Heinz Schmitt	SPD
Rhineland-Palatinate	List		Hans Wallow	SPD
Rhineland-Palatinate	List		Lydia Westrich	SPD
Rhineland-Palatinate	List		Maria Böhmer	CDU
Rhineland-Palatinate	List		Hansjürgen Doss	CDU
Rhineland-Palatinate	List		Susanne Tiemann	CDU
Rhineland-Palatinate	List		Helmut Schäfer	FDP
Rhineland-Palatinate	List		Dieter Thomae	FDP
Rhineland-Palatinate	List		Ulrike Höfken	Greens
Rhineland-Palatinate	List		Christian Sterzing	Greens
Baden-Württemberg	162	Stuttgart-Süd	Roland Sauer	CDU
Baden-Württemberg	163	Stuttgart-Nord	Erika Reinhardt	CDU
Baden-Württemberg	164	Böblingen	Brigitte Baumeister	CDU
Baden-Württemberg	165	Esslingen	Otto Hauser	CDU
Baden-Württemberg	166	Nürtingen	Elmar Müller	CDU
Baden-Württemberg	167	Göppingen	Klaus Riegert	CDU
Baden-Württemberg	168	Waiblingen	Paul Laufs	CDU
Baden-Württemberg	169	Ludwigsburg	Matthias Wissmann	CDU
Baden-Württemberg	170	Neckar-Zaber	Renate Hellwig	CDU
Baden-Württemberg	171	Heilbronn	Egon Susset	CDU
Baden-Württemberg	172	Schwäbisch Hall – Hohenlohe	Wolfgang von Stetten	CDU
Baden-Württemberg	173	Backnang – Schwäbisch Gmünd	Dieter Schulte	CDU
Baden-Württemberg	174	Aalen – Heidenheim	Georg Brunnhuber	CDU
Baden-Württemberg	175	Karlsruhe-Stadt	Norbert Rieder	CDU
Baden-Württemberg	176	Karlsruhe-Land	Klaus Bühler	CDU
Baden-Württemberg	177	Rastatt	Peter Götz	CDU
Baden-Württemberg	178	Heidelberg	Karl A. Lamers	CDU
Baden-Württemberg	179	Mannheim I	Egon Jüttner	CDU
Baden-Württemberg	180	Mannheim II	Klaus Dieter Reichardt	CDU
Baden-Württemberg	181	Odenwald – Tauber	Siegfried Hornung	CDU
Baden-Württemberg	182	Rhein-Neckar	Bernd Schmidbauer	CDU
Baden-Württemberg	183	Pforzheim	Roland Richter	CDU
Baden-Württemberg	184	Calw	Hans-Joachim Fuchtel	CDU
Baden-Württemberg	185	Freiburg	Sigrun Löwisch	CDU
Baden-Württemberg	186	Lörrach – Müllheim	Ortrun Schätzle	CDU
Baden-Württemberg	187	Emmendingen – Lahr	Rainer Haungs (Note: Rainer Haungs died on 18 January 1996.)	CDU
Baden-Württemberg	188	Offenburg	Wolfgang Schäuble	CDU
Baden-Württemberg	189	Rottweil – Tuttlingen	Volker Kauder	CDU
Baden-Württemberg	190	Schwarzwald-Baar	Meinrad Belle	CDU
Baden-Württemberg	191	Konstanz	Hans-Peter Repnik	CDU
Baden-Württemberg	192	Waldshut	Werner Dörflinger	CDU
Baden-Württemberg	193	Reutlingen	Anton Pfeifer	CDU
Baden-Württemberg	194	Tübingen	Claus-Peter Grotz	CDU
Baden-Württemberg	195	Ulm	Heinz Seiffert	CDU
Baden-Württemberg	196	Biberach	Alois Graf von Waldburg-Zeil	CDU
Baden-Württemberg	197	Ravensburg – Bodensee	Andreas Schockenhoff	CDU
Baden-Württemberg	198	Zollernalb – Sigmaringen	Dietmar Schlee	CDU
Baden-Württemberg	List		Brigitte Adler	SPD
Baden-Württemberg	List		Robert Antretter	SPD
Baden-Württemberg	List		Hermann Bachmaier	SPD
Baden-Württemberg	List		Rudolf Bindig	SPD
Baden-Württemberg	List		Hans Martin Bury	SPD
Baden-Württemberg	List		Marion Caspers-Merk	SPD
Baden-Württemberg	List		Peter Conradi	SPD
Baden-Württemberg	List		Herta Däubler-Gmelin	SPD
Baden-Württemberg	List		Peter Dreßen	SPD
Baden-Württemberg	List		Gernot Erler	SPD
Baden-Württemberg	List		Liesel Hartenstein	SPD
Baden-Württemberg	List		Klaus Kirschner	SPD
Baden-Württemberg	List		Nicolette Kressl	SPD
Baden-Württemberg	List		Christa Lörcher	SPD
Baden-Württemberg	List		Jürgen Meyer	SPD
Baden-Württemberg	List		Siegmar Mosdorf	SPD
Baden-Württemberg	List		Doris Odendahl	SPD
Baden-Württemberg	List		Karin Rehbock-Zureich	SPD
Baden-Württemberg	List		Hermann Scheer	SPD
Baden-Württemberg	List		Jörg Tauss	SPD
Baden-Württemberg	List		Siegfried Vergin	SPD
Baden-Württemberg	List		Ute Vogt	SPD
Baden-Württemberg	List		Konstanze Wegner	SPD
Baden-Württemberg	List		Matthias Weisheit	SPD
Baden-Württemberg	List		Gert Weisskirchen	SPD
Baden-Württemberg	List		Olaf Feldmann	FDP
Baden-Württemberg	List		Gisela Frick	FDP
Baden-Württemberg	List		Helmut Haussmann	FDP
Baden-Württemberg	List		Ulrich Heinrich	FDP
Baden-Württemberg	List		Birgit Homburger	FDP
Baden-Württemberg	List		Klaus Kinkel	FDP
Baden-Württemberg	List		Roland Kohn	FDP
Baden-Württemberg	List		Wolfgang Weng	FDP
Baden-Württemberg	List		Uschi Eid	Greens
Baden-Württemberg	List		Rita Grießhaber	Greens
Baden-Württemberg	List		Monika Knoche	Greens
Baden-Württemberg	List		Angelika Köster-Loßack	Greens
Baden-Württemberg	List		Oswald Metzger	Greens
Baden-Württemberg	List		Cem Özdemir	Greens
Baden-Württemberg	List		Jürgen Rochlitz	Greens
Baden-Württemberg	List		Rezzo Schlauch	Greens
Baden-Württemberg	List		Winfried Wolf	PDS
Baden-Württemberg	List		Franz Romer (Note: Franz Romer took office on 1 February 1996, to succeed Rainer Haungs.)	CDU
Bavaria	199	Altötting	Josef Hollerith	CSU
Bavaria	200	Freising	Albert Probst	CSU
Bavaria	201	Fürstenfeldbruck	Gerda Hasselfeldt	CSU
Bavaria	202	Ingolstadt	Horst Seehofer	CSU
Bavaria	203	Munich Centre	Ulrike Mascher	SPD
Bavaria	204	Munich North	Johannes Singhammer	CSU
Bavaria	205	Munich East	Herbert Frankenhauser	CSU
Bavaria	206	Munich South	Erich Riedl	CSU
Bavaria	207	Munich West	Kurt Faltlhauser (Note: Kurt Faltlhauser resigned on 20 November 1995.)	CSU
Bavaria	208	Munich Land	Martin Mayer	CSU
Bavaria	209	Rosenheim	Wolfgang Zeitlmann	CSU
Bavaria	210	Starnberg	Wolfgang Gröbl	CSU
Bavaria	211	Traunstein	Peter Ramsauer	CSU
Bavaria	212	Weilheim	Michaela Geiger	CSU
Bavaria	213	Deggendorf	Bartholomäus Kalb	CSU
Bavaria	214	Landshut	Wolfgang Götzer	CSU
Bavaria	215	Passau	Klaus Rose	CSU
Bavaria	216	Rottal-Inn	Max Straubinger	CSU
Bavaria	217	Straubing	Ernst Hinsken	CSU
Bavaria	218	Amberg	Rudolf Kraus	CSU
Bavaria	219	Regensburg	Benno Zierer	CSU
Bavaria	220	Schwandorf	Dionys Jobst	CSU
Bavaria	221	Weiden	Simon Wittmann (Note: Simon Wittmann resigned on 21 August 1996.)	CSU
Bavaria	222	Bamberg	Gerhard Scheu	CSU
Bavaria	223	Bayreuth	Hartmut Koschyk	CSU
Bavaria	224	Coburg	Otto Regenspurger	CSU
Bavaria	225	Hof	Jürgen Warnke	CSU
Bavaria	226	Kulmbach	Bernd Protzner	CSU
Bavaria	227	Ansbach	Carl-Dieter Spranger	CSU
Bavaria	228	Erlangen	Gerhard Friedrich	CSU
Bavaria	229	Fürth	Christian Schmidt	CSU
Bavaria	230	Nuremberg North	Dagmar Wöhrl	CSU
Bavaria	231	Nuremberg South	Renate Blank	CSU
Bavaria	232	Roth	Hansgeorg Hauser	CSU
Bavaria	233	Aschaffenburg	Norbert Geis	CSU
Bavaria	234	Bad Kissingen	Eduard Lintner	CSU
Bavaria	235	Main-Spessart	Wolfgang Zöller	CSU
Bavaria	236	Schweinfurt	Michael Glos	CSU
Bavaria	237	Würzburg	Wolfgang Bötsch	CSU
Bavaria	238	Augsburg-Stadt	Christian Ruck	CSU
Bavaria	239	Augsburg-Land	Eduard Oswald	CSU
Bavaria	240	Donau-Ries	Hans Raidel	CSU
Bavaria	241	Neu-Ulm	Theo Waigel	CSU
Bavaria	242	Oberallgäu	Gerd Müller	CSU
Bavaria	243	Ostallgäu	Kurt Rossmanith	CSU
Bavaria	List		Klaus Barthel	SPD
Bavaria	List		Hans Büttner	SPD
Bavaria	List		Petra Ernstberger	SPD
Bavaria	List		Gabriele Fograscher	SPD
Bavaria	List		Günter Gloser	SPD
Bavaria	List		Peter Glotz (Note: Peter Glotz resigned on 24 September 1996.)	SPD
Bavaria	List		Angelika Graf	SPD
Bavaria	List		Uwe Hiksch	SPD
Bavaria	List		Frank Hofmann	SPD
Bavaria	List		Brunhilde Irber	SPD
Bavaria	List		Susanne Kastner	SPD
Bavaria	List		Walter Kolbow	SPD
Bavaria	List		Horst Kubatschka	SPD
Bavaria	List		Robert Leidinger	SPD
Bavaria	List		Heide Mattischeck	SPD
Bavaria	List		Martin Pfaff	SPD
Bavaria	List		Georg Pfannenstein	SPD
Bavaria	List		Otto Schily	SPD
Bavaria	List		Horst Schmidbauer	SPD
Bavaria	List		Erika Simm	SPD
Bavaria	List		Sigrid Skarpelis-Sperk	SPD
Bavaria	List		Ludwig Stiegler	SPD
Bavaria	List		Jella Teuchner	SPD
Bavaria	List		Uta Titze-Stecher	SPD
Bavaria	List		Günter Verheugen	SPD
Bavaria	List		Verena Wohlleben	SPD
Bavaria	List		Hanna Wolf	SPD
Bavaria	List		Heidemarie Wright	SPD
Bavaria	List		Marlene Rupprecht (Note: Marlene Rupprecht took office on 25 September 1996, to succeed Peter Glotz.)	SPD
Bavaria	List		Albert Dess	CSU
Bavaria	List		Maria Eichhorn	CSU
Bavaria	List		Helmut Jawurek	CSU
Bavaria	List		Peter Keller	CSU
Bavaria	List		Hans Klein (Note: Hans Klein died on 26 November 1996.)	CSU
Bavaria	List		Hans Michelbach	CSU
Bavaria	List		Matthäus Strebl (Note: Matthäus Strebl took office on 20 November 1995, to succeed Kurt Faltlhauser.)	CSU
Bavaria	List		Fritz Wittmann (Note: Fritz Wittmann took office on 22 August 1996, to succeed Simon Wittmann.)	CSU
Bavaria	List		Marion Seib (Note: Marion Seib took office on 27 November 1996, to succeed Hans Klein.)	CSU
Bavaria	List		Hildebrecht Braun	FDP
Bavaria	List		Horst Friedrich	FDP
Bavaria	List		Ulrich Irmer	FDP
Bavaria	List		Sabine Leutheusser-Schnarrenberger	FDP
Bavaria	List		Cornelia Schmalz-Jacobsen	FDP
Bavaria	List		Max Stadler	FDP
Bavaria	List		Elisabeth Altmann	Greens
Bavaria	List		Gerald Häfner	Greens
Bavaria	List		Halo Saibold	Greens
Bavaria	List		Christine Scheel	Greens
Bavaria	List		Albert Schmidt	Greens
Bavaria	List		Helmut Wilhelm	Greens
Bavaria	List		Eva Bulling-Schröter	PDS
Saarland	244	Saarbrücken I	Oskar Lafontaine (Note: Oskar Lafontaine resigned on 17 November 1994.)	SPD
Saarland	245	Saarbrücken II	Jutta Müller	SPD
Saarland	246	Saarlouis	Ottmar Schreiner	SPD
Saarland	247	St. Wendel	Hans-Georg Wagner	SPD
Saarland	248	Homburg	Lothar Fischer	SPD
Saarland	List		Peter Altmaier	CDU
Saarland	List		Peter Jacoby	CDU
Saarland	List		Helmut Rauber	CDU
Saarland	List		Klaus Töpfer (Note: Klaus Töpfer resigned on 28 February 1998.)	CDU
Saarland	List		Annegret Kramp-Karrenbauer (Note: Annegret Kramp-Karrenbauer took office on 1 March 1998, to succeed Klaus Töpfer.)	CDU
Saarland	List		Elke Ferner (Note: Elke Ferner took office on 21 November 1994, to succeed Oskar Lafontaine.)	SPD
Berlin	249	Berlin-Tiergarten – Wedding – Nord-Charlottenburg	Jörg-Otto Spiller	SPD
Berlin	250	Berlin-Reinickendorf	Diethard Schütze	CDU
Berlin	251	Berlin-Spandau	Heinrich Lummer	CDU
Berlin	252	Berlin-Zehlendorf – Steglitz	Gero Pfennig	CDU
Berlin	253	Berlin-Charlottenburg – Wilmersdorf	Dietrich Mahlo	CDU
Berlin	254	Berlin-Kreuzberg – Schöneberg	Kurt Neumann	SPD
Berlin	255	Berlin-Tempelhof	Rupert Scholz	CDU
Berlin	256	Berlin-Neukölln	Dankward Buwitt	CDU
Berlin	257	Berlin-Mitte – Prenzlauer Berg	Stefan Heym (Note: Stefan Heym resigned on 11 October 1995.)	PDS
Berlin	258	Berlin-Hohenschönhausen – Pankow – Weißensee	Manfred Müller	PDS
Berlin	259	Berlin-Friedrichshain – Lichtenberg	Christa Luft	PDS
Berlin	260	Berlin-Köpenick – Treptow	Siegfried Scheffler	SPD
Berlin	261	Berlin-Hellersdorf – Marzahn	Gregor Gysi	PDS
Berlin	List		Wolfgang Behrendt	SPD
Berlin	List		Ingrid Holzhüter	SPD
Berlin	List		Siegrun Klemmer	SPD
Berlin	List		Thomas Krüger	SPD
Berlin	List		Renate Rennebach	SPD
Berlin	List		Wolfgang Thierse	SPD
Berlin	List		Sabine Bergmann-Pohl	CDU
Berlin	List		Jochen Feilcke	CDU
Berlin	List		Wilma Glücklich	CDU
Berlin	List		Franziska Eichstädt-Bohlig	Greens
Berlin	List		Andrea Fischer	Greens
Berlin	List		Gerd Poppe	Greens
Berlin	List		Günter Rexrodt	FDP
Berlin	List		Klaus Röhl	FDP
Berlin	List		Hanns-Peter Hartmann (Note: Hanns-Peter Hartmann took office on 25 November 1995, to succeed Stefan Heym.)	PDS
Mecklenburg-Vorpommern	262	Wismar – Gadebusch – Grevesmühlen – Doberan – Bützow	Hans-Otto Schmiedeberg	CDU
Mecklenburg-Vorpommern	263	Schwerin – Hagenow	Hans-Joachim Hacker	SPD
Mecklenburg-Vorpommern	264	Güstrow – Sternberg – Lübz – Parchim – Ludwigslust	Günter Marten	CDU
Mecklenburg-Vorpommern	265	Rostock	Christine Lucyga	SPD
Mecklenburg-Vorpommern	266	Rostock-Land – Ribnitz-Damgarten – Teterow – Malchin	Werner Kuhn	CDU
Mecklenburg-Vorpommern	267	Stralsund – Rügen – Grimmen	Angela Merkel	CDU
Mecklenburg-Vorpommern	268	Greifswald – Wolgast – Demmin	Ulrich Adam	CDU
Mecklenburg-Vorpommern	269	Neubrandenburg – Altentreptow – Waren – Röbel	Paul Krüger	CDU
Mecklenburg-Vorpommern	270	Neustrelitz – Strasburg – Pasewalk – Ueckermünde – Anklam	Susanne Jaffke	CDU
Mecklenburg-Vorpommern	List		Willibald Jacob	PDS
Mecklenburg-Vorpommern	List		Andrea Lederer	PDS
Mecklenburg-Vorpommern	List		Günther Maleuda	PDS
Mecklenburg-Vorpommern	List		Tilo Braune	SPD
Mecklenburg-Vorpommern	List		Christel Deichmann	SPD
Mecklenburg-Vorpommern	List		Rainer Ortleb	FDP
Brandenburg	271	Neuruppin – Kyritz – Wittstock – Pritzwalk – Perleberg	Ernst Bahr	SPD
Brandenburg	272	Prenzlau – Angermünde – Schwedt – Templin – Gransee	Markus Meckel	SPD
Brandenburg	273	Oranienburg – Nauen	Wolfgang Ilte	SPD
Brandenburg	274	Eberswalde – Bernau – Bad Freienwalde	Bodo Teichmann	SPD
Brandenburg	275	Brandenburg a.d. Havel – Rathenow – Belzig	Hans-Hinrich Knaape	SPD
Brandenburg	276	Potsdam	Emil Schnell	SPD
Brandenburg	277	Fürstenwalde – Strausberg – Seelow	Mathias Schubert	SPD
Brandenburg	278	Luckenwalde – Zossen – Jüterbog – Königs Wusterhausen	Herbert Meißner	SPD
Brandenburg	279	Frankfurt (Oder) – Eisenhüttenstadt – Beeskow	Winfried Mante	SPD
Brandenburg	280	Cottbus – Guben – Forst	Werner Labsch	SPD
Brandenburg	281	Senftenberg – Calau – Spremberg	Albrecht Papenroth	SPD
Brandenburg	282	Bad Liebenwerda – Finsterwalde – Herzberg – Lübben – Luckau	Stephan Hilsberg	SPD
Brandenburg	List		Rainer Eppelmann	CDU
Brandenburg	List		Ulf Fink	CDU
Brandenburg	List		Ulrich Junghanns	CDU
Brandenburg	List		Manfred Koslowski	CDU
Brandenburg	List		Michael Stübgen	CDU
Brandenburg	List		Michael Wonneberger	CDU
Brandenburg	List		Maritta Böttcher	PDS
Brandenburg	List		Dagmar Enkelmann	PDS
Brandenburg	List		Rolf Kutzmutz	PDS
Brandenburg	List		Klaus-Jürgen Warnick	PDS
Brandenburg	List		Jürgen Türk	FDP
Saxony-Anhalt	283	Altmark	Reinhard Weis	SPD
Saxony-Anhalt	284	Elbe-Havel-Gebiet und Haldensleben – Wolmirstedt	Peter Letzgus	CDU
Saxony-Anhalt	285	Harz und Vorharzgebiet	Monika Brudlewsky	CDU
Saxony-Anhalt	286	Magdeburg	Uwe Küster	SPD
Saxony-Anhalt	287	Magdeburg – Schönebeck – Wanzleben – Staßfurt	Hartmut Büttner	CDU
Saxony-Anhalt	288	Wittenberg – Gräfenhainichen – Jessen – Roßlau – Zerbst	Ulrich Petzold	CDU
Saxony-Anhalt	289	Dessau – Bitterfeld	Wolfgang Krause	CDU
Saxony-Anhalt	290	Bernburg – Aschersleben – Quedlinburg	Reiner Krziskewitz	CDU
Saxony-Anhalt	291	Halle-Altstadt	Christel Hanewinckel	SPD
Saxony-Anhalt	292	Halle-Neustadt – Saalkreis – Köthen	Manfred Lischewski	CDU
Saxony-Anhalt	293	Merseburg – Querfurt – Weißenfels	Clemens Schwalbe	CDU
Saxony-Anhalt	294	Zeitz – Hohenmölsen – Naumburg – Nebra	Margarete Späte	CDU
Saxony-Anhalt	295	Eisleben – Hettstedt – Sangerhausen	Frederick Schulze	CDU
Saxony-Anhalt	List		Eberhard Brecht	SPD
Saxony-Anhalt	List		Manfred Hampel	SPD
Saxony-Anhalt	List		Sabine Kaspereit	SPD
Saxony-Anhalt	List		Ilse Schumann	SPD
Saxony-Anhalt	List		Wolfgang Bierstedt	PDS
Saxony-Anhalt	List		Petra Bläss	PDS
Saxony-Anhalt	List		Heidi Knake-Werner	PDS
Saxony-Anhalt	List		Uwe-Jens Rössel	PDS
Saxony-Anhalt	List		Uwe Lühr	FDP
Saxony-Anhalt	List		Steffi Lemke	Greens
Thuringia	296	Nordhausen – Worbis – Heiligenstadt	Manfred Grund	CDU
Thuringia	297	Eisenach – Mühlhausen	Manfred Heise	CDU
Thuringia	298	Sömmerda – Artern – Sondershausen – Langensalza	Johannes Selle	CDU
Thuringia	299	Gotha – Arnstadt	Gerhard Päselt	CDU
Thuringia	300	Erfurt	Norbert Otto	CDU
Thuringia	301	Weimar – Apolda – Erfurt-Land	Heinz-Jürgen Kronberg	CDU
Thuringia	302	Jena – Rudolstadt – Stadtroda	Roland Richwien (Note: Roland Richwien resigned on 4 November 1997.)	CDU
Thuringia	303	Gera-Stadt – Eisenberg – Gera-Land I	Hans-Ulrich Köhler	CDU
Thuringia	304	Altenburg – Schmölln – Greiz – Gera-Land II	Harald Kahl	CDU
Thuringia	305	Saalfeld – Pößneck – Schleiz – Lobenstein – Zeulenroda	Kersten Wetzel	CDU
Thuringia	306	Meiningen – Bad Salzungen – Hildburghausen – Sonneberg	Arnulf Kriedner	CDU
Thuringia	307	Suhl – Schmalkalden – Ilmenau – Neuhaus	Claudia Nolte	CDU
Thuringia	List		Iris Gleicke	SPD
Thuringia	List		Christoph Matschie	SPD
Thuringia	List		Gerhard Neumann	SPD
Thuringia	List		Edelbert Richter	SPD
Thuringia	List		Gisela Schröter	SPD
Thuringia	List		Wieland Sorge	SPD
Thuringia	List		Ludwig Elm	PDS
Thuringia	List		Ruth Fuchs	PDS
Thuringia	List		Gerhard Jüttemann	PDS
Thuringia	List		Rosel Neuhäuser	PDS
Thuringia	List		Vera Lengsfeld	Greens
Thuringia	List		Karlheinz Guttmacher	FDP
Thuringia	List		Elke Holzapfel (Note: Elke Holzapfel took office on 5 November 1997, to succeed Roland Richwien.)	CDU
Saxony	308	Delitzsch – Eilenburg – Torgau – Wurzen	Angelika Pfeiffer	CDU
Saxony	309	Leipzig I	Hermann Pohler	CDU
Saxony	310	Leipzig II	Gerhard Schulz	CDU
Saxony	311	Leipzig-Land – Borna – Geithain	Rolf Rau	CDU
Saxony	312	Döbeln – Grimma – Oschatz	Manfred Kolbe	CDU
Saxony	313	Meißen – Riesa – Großenhain	Hans-Dirk Bierling	CDU
Saxony	314	Hoyerswerda – Kamenz – Weißwasser	Ulrich Klinkert	CDU
Saxony	315	Görlitz – Zittau – Niesky	Georg Janovsky	CDU
Saxony	316	Bautzen – Löbau	Gottfried Haschke	CDU
Saxony	317	Pirna – Sebnitz – Bischofswerda	Klaus Brähmig	CDU
Saxony	318	Dresden I	Christa Reichard	CDU
Saxony	319	Dresden II	Johannes Nitsch	CDU
Saxony	320	Dresden-Land – Freital – Dippoldiswalde	Rainer Jork	CDU
Saxony	321	Freiberg – Brand-Erbisdorf – Flöha – Marienberg	Joachim Schmidt	CDU
Saxony	322	Glauchau – Rochlitz – Hohenstein-Ernstthal – Hainichen	Gottfried Tröger	CDU
Saxony	323	Chemnitz I	Rudolf Meinl	CDU
Saxony	324	Chemnitz II – Chemnitz-Land	Bernd Klaußner	CDU
Saxony	325	Annaberg – Stollberg – Zschopau	Wolfgang Engelmann	CDU
Saxony	326	Aue – Schwarzenberg – Klingenthal	Wolfgang Dehnel	CDU
Saxony	327	Zwickau – Werdau	Michael Luther	CDU
Saxony	328	Reichenbach – Plauen – Auerbach – Oelsnitz	Rudolf Braun	CDU
Saxony	List		Iris Follak	SPD
Saxony	List		Jelena Hoffmann	SPD
Saxony	List		Renate Jäger	SPD
Saxony	List		Christine Kurzhals (Note: Christine Kurzhals died on 4 May 1998.)	SPD
Saxony	List		Christian Müller	SPD
Saxony	List		Richard Schuhmann	SPD
Saxony	List		Rolf Schwanitz	SPD
Saxony	List		Gerald Thalheim	SPD
Saxony	List		Gunter Weißgerber	SPD
Saxony	List		Jens Heinzig (Note: Jens Heinzig took office on 13 May 1998, to succeed Christine Kurzhals.)	SPD
Saxony	List		Heinrich Graf von Einsiedel	PDS
Saxony	List		Uwe-Jens Heuer	PDS
Saxony	List		Barbara Höll	PDS
Saxony	List		Heidemarie Lüth	PDS
Saxony	List		Christina Schenk	PDS
Saxony	List		Steffen Tippach	PDS
Saxony	List		Antje Hermenau	Greens
Saxony	List		Werner Schulz	Greens
Saxony	List		Joachim Günther	FDP

== See also ==
- Politics of Germany
- List of Bundestag Members
