= Dortmund II =

German federal electoral constituency

142 Dortmund II
- Electoral district for the Bundestag
- Dortmund II in 2025
- State: North Rhine-Westphalia
- Population: 304,800 (2019)
- Electorate: 199,317 (2021)
- Major settlements: Dortmund (partial)
- Area: 154.4 km^{2}

Current electoral district
- Created: 1949
- Party: SPD
- Member: Sabine Poschmann
- Elected: 2013, 2017, 2021, 2025

Dortmund II is an electoral constituency (German: Wahlkreis) represented in the Bundestag. It elects one member via first-past-the-post voting. Under the current constituency numbering system, it is designated as constituency 142. It is located in the Ruhr region of North Rhine-Westphalia, comprising the eastern part of the city of Dortmund.

Dortmund II was created for the inaugural 1949 federal election. Since 2013, it has been represented by Sabine Poschmann of the Social Democratic Party (SPD).

== Geography ==
Dortmund II is located in the Ruhr region of North Rhine-Westphalia. As of the 2021 federal election, it comprises the Stadtbezirke of 1 Eving, 2 Scharnhorst, 3 Brackel, 4 Aplerbeck, and 5 Hörde and the Stadtteil of Innenstadt-Nord from 0 Innenstadt.

== History ==
Dortmund II was created in 1949. In the 1949 election, it was North Rhine-Westphalia constituency 57 in the numbering system. From 1953 through 1961, it was number 116. From 1965 through 1976, it was number 115. From 1980 through 1998, it was number 114. From 2002 through 2009, it was number 144. In the 2013 through 2021 elections, it was number 143. From the 2025 election, it has been number 142.

Originally, the constituency comprised the southern part of the independent city of Dortmund. From 1980 through 1998, it comprised the Stadtbezirke of 1 Eving, 2 Scharnhorst, 3 Brackel, and 9 Mengede, as well as the Stadtteil of Innenstadt-Nord from 0 Innenstadt. It acquired its current borders in the 2002 election.

Election	No.	Name	Borders
1949	57	Dortmund II	Dortmund city (only southern parts)
1953	116	Dortmund II	Dortmund city (only southern parts)
1957	116	Dortmund II	Dortmund city (only southern parts)
1961	116	Dortmund II	Dortmund city (only southern parts)
1965	115	Dortmund II	Dortmund city (only southern parts)
1969	115	Dortmund II	Dortmund city (only southern parts)
1972	115	Dortmund II	Dortmund city (only southern parts)
1976	115	Dortmund II	Dortmund city (only southern parts)
1980	114	Dortmund II	Dortmund city (only 0 Innenstadt (only Innenstadt-Nord Stadtteil), 1 Eving, 2 Scharnhorst, 3 Brackel, and 9 Mengede Stadtbezirke)
1983	114	Dortmund II	Dortmund city (only 0 Innenstadt (only Innenstadt-Nord Stadtteil), 1 Eving, 2 Scharnhorst, 3 Brackel, and 9 Mengede Stadtbezirke)
1987	114	Dortmund II	Dortmund city (only 0 Innenstadt (only Innenstadt-Nord Stadtteil), 1 Eving, 2 Scharnhorst, 3 Brackel, and 9 Mengede Stadtbezirke)
1990	114	Dortmund II	Dortmund city (only 0 Innenstadt (only Innenstadt-Nord Stadtteil), 1 Eving, 2 Scharnhorst, 3 Brackel, and 9 Mengede Stadtbezirke)
1994	114	Dortmund II	Dortmund city (only 0 Innenstadt (only Innenstadt-Nord Stadtteil), 1 Eving, 2 Scharnhorst, 3 Brackel, and 9 Mengede Stadtbezirke)
1998	114	Dortmund II	Dortmund city (only 0 Innenstadt (only Innenstadt-Nord Stadtteil), 1 Eving, 2 Scharnhorst, 3 Brackel, and 9 Mengede Stadtbezirke)
2002	144	Dortmund II	Dortmund city (only 0 Innenstadt (only Innenstadt-Nord Stadtteil), 1 Eving, 2 Scharnhorst, 3 Brackel, 4 Aplerbeck, and 5 Hörde Stadtbezirke)
2005	144	Dortmund II	Dortmund city (only 0 Innenstadt (only Innenstadt-Nord Stadtteil), 1 Eving, 2 Scharnhorst, 3 Brackel, 4 Aplerbeck, and 5 Hörde Stadtbezirke)
2009	144	Dortmund II	Dortmund city (only 0 Innenstadt (only Innenstadt-Nord Stadtteil), 1 Eving, 2 Scharnhorst, 3 Brackel, 4 Aplerbeck, and 5 Hörde Stadtbezirke)
2013	143	Dortmund II	Dortmund city (only 0 Innenstadt (only Innenstadt-Nord Stadtteil), 1 Eving, 2 Scharnhorst, 3 Brackel, 4 Aplerbeck, and 5 Hörde Stadtbezirke)
2017	143	Dortmund II	Dortmund city (only 0 Innenstadt (only Innenstadt-Nord Stadtteil), 1 Eving, 2 Scharnhorst, 3 Brackel, 4 Aplerbeck, and 5 Hörde Stadtbezirke)
2021	143	Dortmund II	Dortmund city (only 0 Innenstadt (only Innenstadt-Nord Stadtteil), 1 Eving, 2 Scharnhorst, 3 Brackel, 4 Aplerbeck, and 5 Hörde Stadtbezirke)
2025	142	Dortmund II	Dortmund city (only 0 Innenstadt (only Innenstadt-Nord Stadtteil), 1 Eving, 2 Scharnhorst, 3 Brackel, 4 Aplerbeck, and 5 Hörde Stadtbezirke)

== Members ==
The constituency has been held continuously by the Social Democratic Party (SPD) since its creation. It was first represented by Dietrich Keuning from 1949 to 1961, when he was succeeded by Willi Beuster until 1969. Friedhelm Dohmann then served a single term. Hans-Eberhard Urbaniak was elected in 1982 and was representative until 1980. Alfred Meininghaus served two terms from 1980 to 1987. Wolfgang Weiermann was then representative from 1987 to 2002. Ulla Burchardt served from 2002 to 2013. Sabine Poschmann was elected in 2013, and re-elected in 2017, 2021 and 2025.

Election	Member	Party	%
1949	Dietrich Keuning	SPD	41.4
1953	Dietrich Keuning	SPD	45.8
1957	Dietrich Keuning	SPD	49.7
1961	Willi Beuster	SPD	52.0
1965	Willi Beuster	SPD	60.6
1969	Friedhelm Dohmann	SPD	63.0
1972	Hans-Eberhard Urbaniak	SPD	69.4
1976	Hans-Eberhard Urbaniak	SPD	66.1
1980	Alfred Meininghaus	SPD	64.1
1983	Alfred Meininghaus	SPD	60.8
1987	Wolfgang Weiermann	SPD	60.7
1990	Wolfgang Weiermann	SPD	58.9
1994	Wolfgang Weiermann	SPD	60.0
1998	Wolfgang Weiermann	SPD	63.5
2002	Ulla Burchardt	SPD	60.0
2005	Ulla Burchardt	SPD	57.9
2009	Ulla Burchardt	SPD	42.4
2013	Sabine Poschmann	SPD	46.7
2017	Sabine Poschmann	SPD	38.8
2021	Sabine Poschmann	SPD	39.1
2025	Sabine Poschmann	SPD	32.4

== Election results ==
=== 2025 election ===
Federal election (2025): Dortmund II
Notes:	Blue background denotes the winner of the electorate vote. Pink background denotes a candidate elected from their party list. Yellow background denotes an electorate win by a list member, or other incumbent. A ✓ or ✗ denotes status of any incumbent, win or lose respectively.						
Party	Candidate	Votes	%	±%	Party votes	%	±%
SPD	✓ Sabine Poschmann	49,485	32.4	▼6.7	37,510	24.5	▼11.3
CDU	Michael Depenbrock	37,960	24.8	▲4.6	36,026	23.5	▲4.1
AfD	Matthias Helferich	28,240	18.5	▲10.2	27,597	18.0	▲10.1
Greens	Hannah Rosenbaum	15,742	10.3	▼4.4	17,291	11.3	▼3.9
Left	Sonja Lemke	13,794	9.0	▲4.9	15,577	10.2	▲5.7
BSW					7,330	4.8	
FDP	Nils Mehrer	4,047	2.6	▼4.6	5,405	3.5	▼6.0
PARTEI	Nadja Reigl	3,503	2.3	▼0.1	1,247	0.8	▼0.9
Tierschutzpartei				▼2.5	2,642	1.7	▼0.3
Volt				▼0.3	852	0.6	▲0.3
FW				▼0.9	491	0.3	▼0.3
Team Todenhöfer					368	0.2	▼0.8
dieBasis					330	0.2	▼0.5
PdF					226	0.1	▲0.1
BD					176	0.1	
MLPD				▼0.1	80	0.1	0.0
MERA25					78	0.1	
Values					64	0.0	
Pirates							▼0.4
Gesundheitsforschung							▼0.1
Humanists							▼0.1
ÖDP							▼0.1
Bündnis C							0.0
SGP							0.0
Informal votes		1,537			1,018		
Total valid votes		152,771			153,290		
Turnout		154,308	78.9	▲6.8			
SPD hold	Majority	11,525	7.6	▼3.7			

=== 2021 election ===
Federal election (2021): Dortmund II
Notes:	Blue background denotes the winner of the electorate vote. Pink background denotes a candidate elected from their party list. Yellow background denotes an electorate win by a list member, or other incumbent. A ✓ or ✗ denotes status of any incumbent, win or lose respectively.						
Party	Candidate	Votes	%	±%	Party votes	%	±%
SPD	✓ Sabine Poschmann	55,695	39.1	▲0.3	51,080	35.8	▲3.1
CDU	Michael Depenbrock	28,897	20.3	▼7.9	27,650	19.4	▼5.1
Greens	Anke Weber	21,028	14.8	▲8.4	21,714	15.2	▲8.1
AfD	Matthias Helferich	11,816	8.3	▼2.3	11,290	7.9	▼3.0
FDP	Frieder Löhrer	10,270	7.2	▲0.8	13,629	9.5	▼1.3
Left	Sonja Lemke	5,823	4.1	▼4.5	6,361	4.5	▼4.6
Tierschutzpartei	Stephanie Linde	3,589	2.5		2,943	2.1	▲1.1
PARTEI	Sandra Goerdt	3,446	2.4		2,426	1.7	▲0.6
Team Todenhöfer					1,516	1.1	
dieBasis					1,079	0.8	
FW	Iris Häger	1,318	0.9	▼0.1	839	0.6	▲0.2
Pirates					626	0.4	▼0.1
Volt	Nancy Meyer	425	0.3		354	0.2	
NPD					194	0.1	▼0.2
Gesundheitsforschung					191	0.1	0.0
LIEBE					168	0.1	
LfK					147	0.1	
Humanists					85	0.1	0.0
ÖDP					79	0.1	0.0
du.					78	0.1	
MLPD	Klara Kossack	139	0.1		60	0.0	0.0
DKP	Nils Märtin	111	0.1		68	0.0	0.0
V-Partei3					65	0.0	▼0.1
Bündnis C					65	0.0	
PdF					37	0.0	
LKR					25	0.0	
SGP					21	0.0	0.0
Informal votes		1,298			1,065		
Total valid votes		142,557			142,790		
Turnout		143,855	72.2	▲1.4			
SPD hold	Majority	26,798	18.8	▲8.2			

=== 2017 election ===
Federal election (2017): Dortmund II
Notes:	Blue background denotes the winner of the electorate vote. Pink background denotes a candidate elected from their party list. Yellow background denotes an electorate win by a list member, or other incumbent. A ✓ or ✗ denotes status of any incumbent, win or lose respectively.						
Party	Candidate	Votes	%	±%	Party votes	%	±%
SPD	✓ Sabine Poschmann	55,038	38.8	▼7.9	46,513	32.7	▼8.3
CDU	Steffen Kanitz	39,933	28.1	▼4.1	34,822	24.5	▼4.7
AfD	Matthias Helferich	15,074	10.6		15,510	10.9	▲6.8
Left	Celine Ellenore Erlenhofer	12,242	8.6	▲1.7	12,924	9.1	▲1.3
Greens	Ingrid Reuter	9,047	6.4	▼0.4	10,190	7.2	▼1.2
FDP	Sven Görgens	9,031	6.4	▲4.9	15,403	10.8	▲7.0
PARTEI					1,532	1.1	▲0.6
Tierschutzpartei					1,297	0.9	
AD-DEMOKRATEN					1,030	0.7	
Pirates					835	0.6	▼1.9
FW	Henning Müller-Späth	1,524	1.1	▲0.2	527	0.4	▼0.1
NPD					460	0.3	▼1.1
DiB					203	0.1	
Gesundheitsforschung					173	0.1	
BGE					163	0.1	
V-Partei³					152	0.1	
Volksabstimmung					148	0.1	▼0.1
DM					140	0.1	
MLPD					116	0.1	0.0
ÖDP					111	0.1	0.0
Die Humanisten					97	0.1	
DKP					57	0.0	
SGP					13	0.0	0.0
Informal votes		1,945			1,418		
Total valid votes		141,889			142,416		
Turnout		143,834	70.7	▲4.2			
SPD hold	Majority	15,105	10.7	▼3.8			

=== 2013 election ===
Federal election (2013): Dortmund II
Notes:	Blue background denotes the winner of the electorate vote. Pink background denotes a candidate elected from their party list. Yellow background denotes an electorate win by a list member, or other incumbent. A ✓ or ✗ denotes status of any incumbent, win or lose respectively.						
Party	Candidate	Votes	%	±%	Party votes	%	±%
SPD	Sabine Poschmann	63,388	46.7	▲4.4	55,683	40.9	▲5.3
CDU	Steffen Kanitz	43,688	32.2	▲3.1	39,604	29.1	▲4.8
Left	Hannelore Tölke	9,340	6.9	▼3.7	10,568	7.8	▼3.8
Greens	Katja Bender	9,228	6.8	▼2.0	11,328	8.3	▼2.8
AfD					5,571	4.1	
Pirates	Andrea Pieczka	4,036	3.0		3,322	2.4	▲0.7
NPD	Axel Thieme	2,741	2.0	▲0.3	1,894	1.4	▲0.2
FDP	Daniel Poznanski	2,014	1.5	▼5.2	5,139	3.8	▼7.7
PARTEI					643	0.5	
FW	Henning Müller-Späth	1,218	0.9		609	0.4	
PRO					311	0.2	
Volksabstimmung					297	0.2	▲0.1
BIG					241	0.2	
REP					160	0.1	▼0.1
Nichtwahler					129	0.1	
ÖDP					125	0.1	0.0
Party of Reason					122	0.1	
RRP					81	0.1	▼0.1
MLPD					71	0.1	0.0
Die Rechte					50	0.0	
PSG					33	0.0	0.0
BüSo					21	0.0	0.0
Informal votes		1,850			1,501		
Total valid votes		135,653			136,002		
Turnout		137,503	66.5	▼1.1			
SPD hold	Majority	19,700	14.5	▲1.2			

=== 2009 election ===
Federal election (2009): Dortmund II
Notes:	Blue background denotes the winner of the electorate vote. Pink background denotes a candidate elected from their party list. Yellow background denotes an electorate win by a list member, or other incumbent. A ✓ or ✗ denotes status of any incumbent, win or lose respectively.						
Party	Candidate	Votes	%	±%	Party votes	%	±%
SPD	✓ Ulla Burchardt	59,141	42.4	▼15.5	49,813	35.6	▼15.1
CDU	Erich G. Fritz	40,622	29.1	0.0	34,006	24.3	▼0.5
Left	Ulla Jelpke	14,819	10.6	▲5.2	16,104	11.5	▲5.0
Greens	Barbara Blotenberg	12,292	8.8	▲4.8	15,553	11.1	▲2.9
FDP	Daniel Poznanski	9,387	6.7	▲4.2	15,993	11.4	▲4.3
Pirates					2,383	1.7	
NPD	Cassandra Wächter	2,379	1.7	▲0.6	1,654	1.2	▲0.4
Tierschutzpartei					1,000	0.7	▲0.3
RENTNER					931	0.7	
Independent	Michael Balke	922	0.7				
FAMILIE					677	0.5	▲0.2
DVU					663	0.5	
RRP					275	0.2	
REP					263	0.2	▼0.2
Volksabstimmung					149	0.1	0.0
MLPD					101	0.1	0.0
ÖDP					70	0.1	
Centre					53	0.0	0.0
BüSo					42	0.0	0.0
PSG					25	0.0	▼0.1
Informal votes		1,605			1,412		
Total valid votes		139,562			139,755		
Turnout		141,167	67.6	▼7.0			
SPD hold	Majority	18,519	13.3	▼15.5			

=== 2005 election ===
Federal election (2005): Dortmund II
Notes:	Blue background denotes the winner of the electorate vote. Pink background denotes a candidate elected from their party list. Yellow background denotes an electorate win by a list member, or other incumbent. A ✓ or ✗ denotes status of any incumbent, win or lose respectively.						
Party	Candidate	Votes	%	±%	Party votes	%	±%
SPD	✓ Ulla Burchardt	88,135	57.9	▼2.1	77,452	50.8	▼3.7
CDU	Erich Fritz	44,293	29.1	▲2.0	37,827	24.8	▼0.1
Left	Helmut Eigen	8,271	5.4	▲3.8	9,954	6.5	▲4.9
Greens	Birgit Unger	6,088	4.0	▼1.5	12,555	8.2	▼1.0
FDP	Mauritz Faenger	3,907	2.6	▼2.3	10,689	7.1	▼0.1
NPD	Michael Melkis	1,622	1.1		1,251	0.8	▲0.5
Tierschutzpartei					559	0.4	▲0.1
REP					544	0.4	▼0.1
GRAUEN					530	0.3	▲0.1
Familie					421	0.3	▲0.1
MLPD					149	0.1	
From Now on... Democracy Through Referendum					119	0.1	
Socialist Equality Party					111	0.0	
PBC					87	0.1	
BüSo					66	0.0	
Centre					43	0.0	0.0
Informal votes		5,694			5,473		
Total valid votes		152,316			152,537		
Turnout		158,010	74.6	▼3.6			
SPD hold	Majority	43,842	28.8				
