= Mark Helfrich (politician) =

German politician

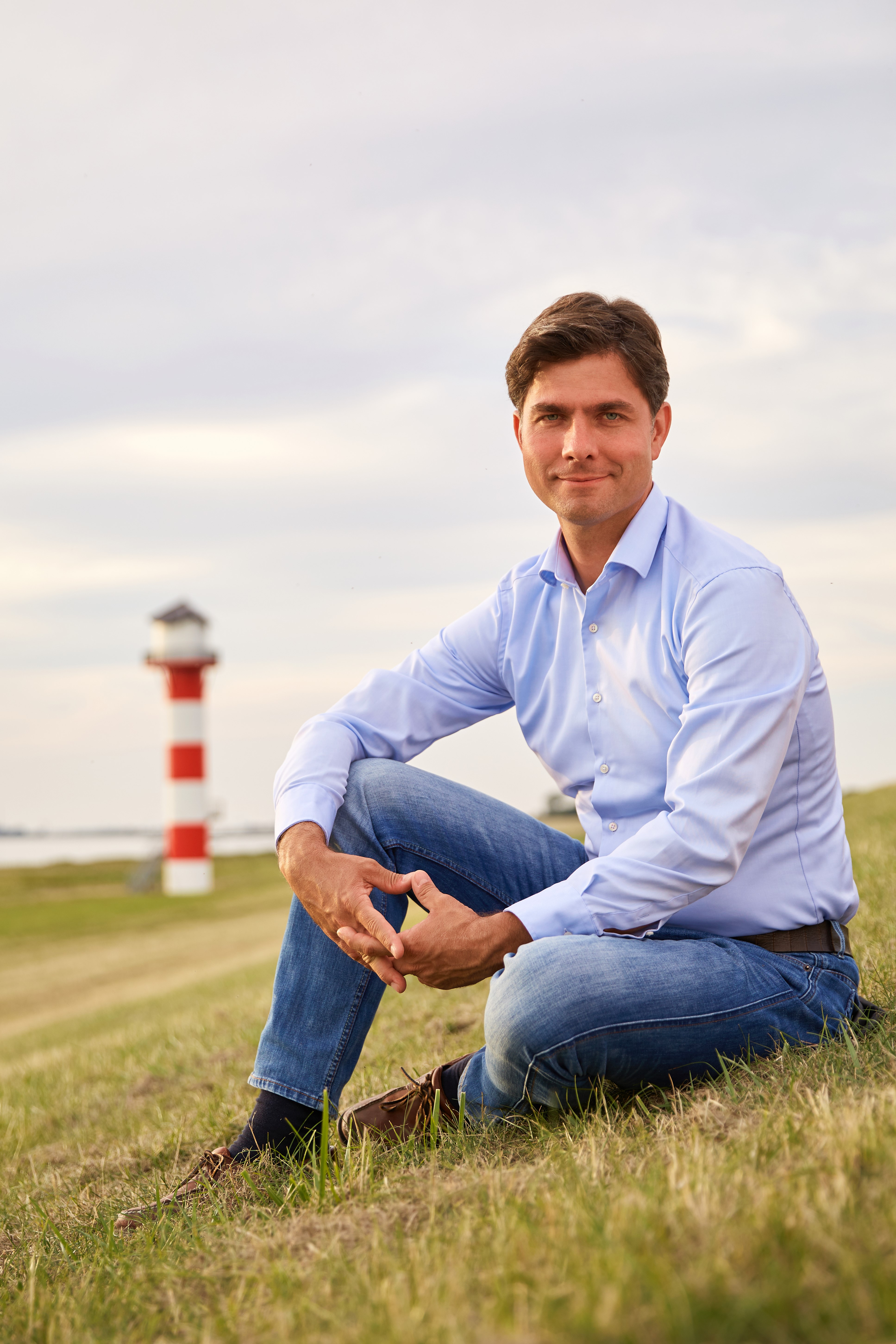
- Helfrich in 2021

Member of the Bundestag
- Incumbent
- Assumed office 22 September 2013
- Preceded by: Rolf Koschorrek
- Constituency: Steinburg – Dithmarschen Süd

Personal details
- Born: 8 September 1978 (age 47) Itzehoe, West Germany
- Party: CDU
- Occupation: Politician, businessman

Mark Helfrich (born 8 September 1978) is a German politician of the Christian Democratic Union (CDU) who has been serving as a member of the Bundestag from the state of Schleswig-Holstein since 2013.

== Early life ==
Helfrich studied in the Auguste Viktoria School in Itzehoe from 1989 to 1999, and also studied Business Studies from 2000 to 2004 at PFH Göttingen.

== Political career ==
In 1995, Helfrich joined the Junge Union and was district chairman of the JU Steinberg from 2000 to 2002. Since 2002, Helfrich has been a board member of the CDU Steinberg and served as treasurer from 2010 to 2014.

Helfrich became a member of the Bundestag in the 2013 German federal election, succeeding Rolf Koschorrek in the district of Steinburg – Dithmarschen Süd. Helfrich received 45.4% of the vote in his district, with a margin of around 11 points over his closest challenger from the SPD. From 2013 until 2014, he served on the Committee on Labor and Social Affairs as well as the Parliamentary Advisory Board on Sustainable Development.

In the 2017 German federal election, Helfrich received a slightly reduced 41.9% in his district. Since 2018, he has been a member of the Committee on European Union Affairs and the Committee on Economic and Energy Affairs.

In the 2021 German federal election, Helfrich barely won his seat, receiving 29.2% of the vote and winning by a margin of 52 votes. He has been serving as his parliamentary group's spokesperson for energy policy.

In the 2025 German federal election, Helfrich received 35.0% of the vote in his district, the most of any candidate in Schleswig-Holstein. Since May 13, 2025, Helfrich has taken over as chairman of the CDU state group in Schleswig-Holstein.

== Other activities ==
- Nuclear Waste Disposal Fund (KENFO), Alternate Member of the Board of Trustees (since 2025)
- Agora Energiewende, Member of the Council
- German Industry Initiative for Energy Efficiency (DENEFF), Member of the Parliamentary Advisory Board
- Rotary International, Member

== Political positions ==
Helfrich voted to approve the extension of the second Greek aid program on 27 February 2015, claiming that "it does not involve any new financial commitments and [...] does not involve a significant reduction in the reform commitments of the Hellenic Republic." He subsequently rejected the third Greek aid program and voted against it on 19 August 2015.

In June 2017, Helfrich voted against his parliamentary group's majority and in favor of Germany's introduction of same-sex marriage.
