= Manfred Müller =

Manfred Müller may refer to:

- Manfred Müller (bishop), German Roman Catholic bishop
- Manfred Müller (footballer), German footballer
- Manfred Müller (politician) (1943–2025), German politician
