= Steinburg – Dithmarschen Süd =

Federal electoral district of Germany

3 Steinburg – Dithmarschen Süd
- Electoral district for the Bundestag
- Steinburg – Dithmarschen Süd in 2025
- State: Schleswig-Holstein
- Population: 221,000 (2019)
- Electorate: 176,899 (2021)
- Major settlements: Itzehoe; Husum; Heide
- Area: 2,000.0 km^{2}

Current electoral district
- Created: 1965
- Party: CDU
- Member: Mark Helfrich
- Elected: 2013, 2017, 2021, 2025

Steinburg – Dithmarschen Süd (English: Steinburg – Dithmarschen South) is an electoral constituency (German: Wahlkreis) represented in the Bundestag. It elects one member via first-past-the-post voting. Under the current constituency numbering system, it is designated as constituency 3. It is located in central western Schleswig-Holstein, comprising the Steinburg district, the southern part of the Dithmarschen district, and part of the Segeberg district.

Steinburg – Dithmarschen Süd was created for the 1965 federal election. Since 2017, it has been represented by Mark Helfrich of the Christian Democratic Union (CDU).

== Geography ==
Steinburg – Dithmarschen Süd is located in central western Schleswig-Holstein. As of the 2021 federal election, it comprises the district of Steinburg, the southern part of the Dithmarschen district (specifically the urban municipality of Brunsbüttel, and the Ämter of Burg-Sankt Michaelisdonn, Marne-Nordsee, and Mitteldithmarschen), and the urban district of Bad Bramstedt and Amt of Bad Bramstedt-Land from the Segeberg district.

== History ==
Steinburg – Dithmarschen Süd was created in 1965, then known as Steinburg – Süderdithmarschen. It contained parts of the abolished constituencies of Steinburg and Norder- und Süderdithmarschen. Until 1972, it was constituency 4 in the numbering system. From 1972 until 2002, its name contained a hyphen between "Dithmarschen" and "Süd".

In the elections of 1965 and 1969, Steinburg – Süderdithmarschen consisted of the districts of Steinburg and Süderdithmarschen. After reform of the administrative divisions in Schleswig-Holstein, the constituency acquired its current name and configuration, containing Steinburg and the southern part of Dithmarschen. In 2002, Bad Bramstedt and Bad Bramstedt-Land became part of Steinburg – Dithmarschen Süd.

Election	No.	Name	Borders
1965	4	Steinburg – Süderdithmarschen	Steinburg district; Süderdithmarschen district
1969	4	Steinburg – Süderdithmarschen	Steinburg district; Süderdithmarschen district
1972	3	Steinburg – Dithmarschen-Süd	Steinburg district; Dithmarschen district (only Brunsbüttel municipality, Burg-Sankt Michaelisdonn Amt, Marne-Nordsee Amt, and Mitteldithmarschen Amt)
1976	3	Steinburg – Dithmarschen-Süd	Steinburg district; Dithmarschen district (only Brunsbüttel municipality, Burg-Sankt Michaelisdonn Amt, Marne-Nordsee Amt, and Mitteldithmarschen Amt)
1980	3	Steinburg – Dithmarschen-Süd	Steinburg district; Dithmarschen district (only Brunsbüttel municipality, Burg-Sankt Michaelisdonn Amt, Marne-Nordsee Amt, and Mitteldithmarschen Amt)
1983	3	Steinburg – Dithmarschen-Süd	Steinburg district; Dithmarschen district (only Brunsbüttel municipality, Burg-Sankt Michaelisdonn Amt, Marne-Nordsee Amt, and Mitteldithmarschen Amt)
1987	3	Steinburg – Dithmarschen-Süd	Steinburg district; Dithmarschen district (only Brunsbüttel municipality, Burg-Sankt Michaelisdonn Amt, Marne-Nordsee Amt, and Mitteldithmarschen Amt)
1990	3	Steinburg – Dithmarschen-Süd	Steinburg district; Dithmarschen district (only Brunsbüttel municipality, Burg-Sankt Michaelisdonn Amt, Marne-Nordsee Amt, and Mitteldithmarschen Amt)
1994	3	Steinburg – Dithmarschen-Süd	Steinburg district; Dithmarschen district (only Brunsbüttel municipality, Burg-Sankt Michaelisdonn Amt, Marne-Nordsee Amt, and Mitteldithmarschen Amt)
1998	3	Steinburg – Dithmarschen-Süd	Steinburg district; Dithmarschen district (only Brunsbüttel municipality, Burg-Sankt Michaelisdonn Amt, Marne-Nordsee Amt, and Mitteldithmarschen Amt)
2002	3	Steinburg – Dithmarschen Süd	Steinburg district; Dithmarschen district (only Brunsbüttel municipality, Burg-Sankt Michaelisdonn Amt, Marne-Nordsee Amt, and Mitteldithmarschen Amt); Segeberg district (only Bad Bramstedt municipality Bad Bramstedt-Land Amt)
2005	3	Steinburg – Dithmarschen Süd	Steinburg district; Dithmarschen district (only Brunsbüttel municipality, Burg-Sankt Michaelisdonn Amt, Marne-Nordsee Amt, and Mitteldithmarschen Amt); Segeberg district (only Bad Bramstedt municipality Bad Bramstedt-Land Amt)
2009	3	Steinburg – Dithmarschen Süd	Steinburg district; Dithmarschen district (only Brunsbüttel municipality, Burg-Sankt Michaelisdonn Amt, Marne-Nordsee Amt, and Mitteldithmarschen Amt); Segeberg district (only Bad Bramstedt municipality Bad Bramstedt-Land Amt)
2013	3	Steinburg – Dithmarschen Süd	Steinburg district; Dithmarschen district (only Brunsbüttel municipality, Burg-Sankt Michaelisdonn Amt, Marne-Nordsee Amt, and Mitteldithmarschen Amt); Segeberg district (only Bad Bramstedt municipality Bad Bramstedt-Land Amt)
2017	3	Steinburg – Dithmarschen Süd	Steinburg district; Dithmarschen district (only Brunsbüttel municipality, Burg-Sankt Michaelisdonn Amt, Marne-Nordsee Amt, and Mitteldithmarschen Amt); Segeberg district (only Bad Bramstedt municipality Bad Bramstedt-Land Amt)
2021	3	Steinburg – Dithmarschen Süd	Steinburg district; Dithmarschen district (only Brunsbüttel municipality, Burg-Sankt Michaelisdonn Amt, Marne-Nordsee Amt, and Mitteldithmarschen Amt); Segeberg district (only Bad Bramstedt municipality Bad Bramstedt-Land Amt)
2025	3	Steinburg – Dithmarschen Süd	Steinburg district; Dithmarschen district (only Brunsbüttel municipality, Burg-Sankt Michaelisdonn Amt, Marne-Nordsee Amt, and Mitteldithmarschen Amt); Segeberg district (only Bad Bramstedt municipality Bad Bramstedt-Land Amt)

== Members ==
The constituency has been held by the Christian Democratic Union (CDU) during all but three Bundestag terms since its creation in 1965. Its first representative was the CDU's Kai-Uwe von Hassel, who served from 1965 until 1980, when the constituency was won by the Social Democratic Party (SPD). It was then represented by Kurt Leuschner for a single term, before returning to the CDU in 1983. Between then and 1998, it was represented by Dietrich Austermann. The constituency was won by the SPD's Cornelie Sonntag-Wolgast in 1998. She was re-elected in 2002, but the constituency again returned to the CDU in 2002. It was then represented by Rolf Koschorrek until 2013. He was succeeded by Mark Helfrich, who was re-elected in 2017 and 2021.

Election	Member	Party	%
1965	Kai-Uwe von Hassel	CDU	52.2
1969	Kai-Uwe von Hassel	CDU	50.8
1972	Kai-Uwe von Hassel	CDU	48.9
1976	Kai-Uwe von Hassel	CDU	48.4
1980	Kurt Leuschner	SPD	48.1
1983	Dietrich Austermann	CDU	51.4
1987	Dietrich Austermann	CDU	47.4
1990	Dietrich Austermann	CDU	48.3
1994	Dietrich Austermann	CDU	47.4
1998	Cornelie Sonntag-Wolgast	SPD	48.8
2002	Cornelie Sonntag-Wolgast	SPD	45.8
2005	Rolf Koschorrek	CDU	44.9
2009	Rolf Koschorrek	CDU	39.8
2013	Mark Helfrich	CDU	45.4
2017	Mark Helfrich	CDU	41.9
2021	Mark Helfrich	CDU	29.2
2025	Mark Helfrich	CDU	35.0

== Election results ==
=== 2025 election ===
Federal election (2025): Steinburg – Dithmarschen Süd
Notes:	Blue background denotes the winner of the electorate vote. Pink background denotes a candidate elected from their party list. Yellow background denotes an electorate win by a list member, or other incumbent. A ✓ or ✗ denotes status of any incumbent, win or lose respectively.						
Party	Candidate	Votes	%	±%	Party votes	%	±%
CDU	✓ Mark Helfrich	50,928	35.0	▲5.8	42,612	29.2	▲4.9
SPD	Hauke Thießen	30,733	21.1	▼8.0	25,645	17.6	▼10.1
AfD	Ralf Kirbach	29,693	20.4	▲12.7	29,679	20.4	▲12.0
Greens	Fabian Faller	14,468	9.9	▼2.4	16,079	11.0	▼3.2
Left	Tobias Braunsdorf	8,709	6.0	▲2.8	9,684	6.6	▲3.3
FDP	Michael Wamser	5,647	3.9	▼10.4	7,447	5.1	▼8.6
BSW					5,355	3.7	New
SSW					4,991	3.4	▲0.9
FW	Jens Köster	3,120	2.1	▲0.2	1,552	1.1	▼0.2
Volt	Marco Schulz	2,137	1.5	New	1,233	0.8	▲0.7
PARTEI					1,213	0.8	▼0.2
BD					236	0.2	New
MLPD					45	<0.1	0.0
Informal votes		1,141			805		
Total valid votes		145,435			145,771		
Turnout		146,576	83.4	▲6.3			
CDU hold	Majority	20,195	13.9	▲13.9			

=== 2021 election ===
Federal election (2021): Steinburg – Dithmarschen Süd
Notes:	Blue background denotes the winner of the electorate vote. Pink background denotes a candidate elected from their party list. Yellow background denotes an electorate win by a list member, or other incumbent. A ✓ or ✗ denotes status of any incumbent, win or lose respectively.						
Party	Candidate	Votes	%	±%	Party votes	%	±%
CDU	✓ Mark Helfrich	39,431	29.2	▼12.7	32,842	24.3	▼11.9
SPD	Karin Thissen	39,379	29.2	▲3.0	37,468	27.7	▲5.0
FDP	Wolfgang Kubicki	19,315	14.3	▲3.3	18,492	13.7	▲0.5
Greens	Ingrid Nestle	16,686	12.4	▲5.6	19,237	14.2	▲4.3
AfD	Jan Voigt	10,429	7.7	▲0.1	11,303	8.4	▼0.2
Left	Michael Schilke	4,339	3.2	▼2.3	4,524	3.3	▼3.3
SSW					3,366	2.5	
Tierschutzpartei					1,719	1.3	
FW	Jens Köster	2,566	1.9	▲0.9	1,713	1.3	▲0.5
dieBasis	Stefan Habermann	2,040	1.5		1,712	1.3	
PARTEI					1,346	1.0	▼0.1
Team Todenhöfer					283	0.2	
V-Partei3	Robert Pilgrim	581	0.4		250	0.2	
Volt					226	0.2	
NPD					190	0.1	▼0.2
Humanists					118	0.1	
ÖDP					105	0.1	▼0.1
LKR	Mark Riemann	214	0.2		84	0.1	
du.					77	0.1	
DKP					29	0.0	
MLPD					25	0.0	0.0
Informal votes		1,319			1,190		
Total valid votes		134,980			135,109		
Turnout		136,299	77.0	▲2.3			
CDU hold	Majority	52	0.0	▼15.8			

=== 2017 election ===
Federal election (2017): Steinburg – Dithmarschen Süd
Notes:	Blue background denotes the winner of the electorate vote. Pink background denotes a candidate elected from their party list. Yellow background denotes an electorate win by a list member, or other incumbent. A ✓ or ✗ denotes status of any incumbent, win or lose respectively.						
Party	Candidate	Votes	%	±%	Party votes	%	±%
CDU	✓ Mark Helfrich	54,812	41.9	▼3.5	47,366	36.2	▼5.7
SPD	Karin Thissen	34,219	26.1	▼7.9	29,756	22.7	▼7.3
FDP	Wolfgang Kubicki	14,440	11.0	▲6.0	17,298	13.2	▲7.1
AfD	Rolf von Rhein	10,006	7.6	▲4.1	11,180	8.5	▲4.1
Greens	Ingrid Nestle	8,791	6.7	▲1.6	12,960	9.9	▲2.3
Left	Björn Thoroe	7,176	5.5	▲1.6	8,732	6.7	▲1.6
PARTEI					1,445	1.1	
FW	Helmut Unger	1,278	1.0		1,002	0.8	▲0.1
BGE					415	0.3	
NPD					471	0.4	▼0.5
ÖDP					191	0.1	
MLPD	Christian Kölle	161	0.1		62	0.0	0.0
Informal votes		1,134			1,139		
Total valid votes		130,883			130,878		
Turnout		132,017	74.7	▲3.2			
CDU hold	Majority	20,593	15.8	▲4.4			

=== 2013 election ===
Federal election (2013): Steinburg – Dithmarschen Süd
Notes:	Blue background denotes the winner of the electorate vote. Pink background denotes a candidate elected from their party list. Yellow background denotes an electorate win by a list member, or other incumbent. A ✓ or ✗ denotes status of any incumbent, win or lose respectively.						
Party	Candidate	Votes	%	±%	Party votes	%	±%
CDU	Mark Helfrich	56,669	45.4	▲5.5	52,408	41.9	▲7.2
SPD	Karin Thissen (Note: Thissen entered the Bundestag on the SPD list after the resignation of Hans-Peter Bartels in May 2015.)	42,476	34.0	▲4.2	37,502	30.0	▲5.0
Greens	Eka von Kalben	6,386	5.1	▼3.4	9,485	7.6	▼2.7
FDP	Wolfgang Kubicki	6,324	5.1	▼7.8	7,689	6.2	▼11.4
Left	Marcel Mansouri	4,909	3.9	▼3.2	6,286	5.0	▼2.8
AfD	Ulrike Trebesius	4,468	3.6		5,492	4.4	
Pirates	Patrick Breyer	2,674	2.1		2,709	2.2	▲0.1
NPD	Hans-Günther Adler	980	0.8	▼0.5	1,038	0.8	▼0.4
Tierschutzpartei					930	0.7	
FW					869	0.7	
Rentner					516	0.4	▼0.9
MLPD					34	0.0	0.0
Informal votes		1,523			1,451		
Total valid votes		124,886			124,958		
Turnout		126,409	71.5	▼0.7			
CDU hold	Majority	14,193	11.4	▲1.4			

=== 2009 election ===
Federal election (2009): Steinburg – Dithmarschen Süd
Notes:	Blue background denotes the winner of the electorate vote. Pink background denotes a candidate elected from their party list. Yellow background denotes an electorate win by a list member, or other incumbent. A ✓ or ✗ denotes status of any incumbent, win or lose respectively.						
Party	Candidate	Votes	%	±%	Party votes	%	±%
CDU	✓ Rolf Koschorrek	49,779	39.8	▼5.1	43,480	34.7	▼4.3
SPD	Jörn Thießen	37,277	29.8	▼11.4	31,282	25.0	▼11.3
FDP	Jürgen Koppelin	16,037	12.8	▲8.4	21,970	17.5	▲6.8
Greens	Bernd Voß	10,665	8.5	▲5.3	12,899	10.3	▲3.7
Left	Dieter Cwielong	8,896	7.1	▲3.5	9,808	7.8	▲3.2
Pirates					2,549	2.0	
Rentner					1,604	1.3	
NPD	Helmut Günter Radunski	1,603	1.3	▲0.2	1,512	1.2	0.0
Independent	Jürgen Peter	715	0.6				
DVU					142	0.1	
MLPD					44	0.0	0.0
Informal votes		3,348			3,030		
Total valid votes		124,972			125,290		
Turnout		128,320	72.3	▼6.2			
CDU hold	Majority	12,502	10.0	▲6.3			

=== 2005 election ===
Federal election (2005): Steinburg – Dithmarschen Süd
Notes:	Blue background denotes the winner of the electorate vote. Pink background denotes a candidate elected from their party list. Yellow background denotes an electorate win by a list member, or other incumbent. A ✓ or ✗ denotes status of any incumbent, win or lose respectively.						
Party	Candidate	Votes	%	±%	Party votes	%	±%
CDU	Rolf Koschorrek	61,471	44.9	▲1.9	53,340	39.0	▲0.4
SPD	Rolf Koschorrek	56,428	41.2	▼4.6	49,715	36.3	▼4.9
FDP	Jürgen Koppelin	6,024	4.4	▼1.6	14,701	10.7	▲1.9
Left	Ernst Molkenthin	4,899	3.6	▲2.3	6,288	4.6	▲3.3
Greens	Bernd Voß	4,480	3.3	▼0.6	8,979	6.6	▼1.1
Familie	Matthias Kortüm	2,143	1.6		2,129	1.6	
NPD	Helmut Radunski	1,471	1.1		1,665	1.2	▲0.9
MLPD					89	0.1	
Informal votes		2,098			2,108		
Total valid votes		136,916			136,906		
Turnout		139,014	78.5	▼1.4			
CDU gain from SPD	Majority	5,043	3.7				

=== 2002 election ===
Federal election (2002): Steinburg – Dithmarschen Süd
Notes:	Blue background denotes the winner of the electorate vote. Pink background denotes a candidate elected from their party list. Yellow background denotes an electorate win by a list member, or other incumbent. A ✓ or ✗ denotes status of any incumbent, win or lose respectively.						
Party	Candidate	Votes	%	±%	Party votes	%	±%
SPD	✓ Cornelie Sonntag-Wolgast	63,559	45.8	▼2.1	57,200	41.2	▼3.4
CDU	Dietrich Austermann	59,689	43	▼1.7	53,495	38.5	▲0.7
FDP	Jürgen Koppelin	8,261	6.0	▲3.3	12,250	8.8	▲1.1
Greens	Bernd Voß	5,314	3.8	▲0.6	10,664	7.7	▲2.5
Schill					2,189	1.6	New
PDS	Klaus Roosen	1,765	1.3	▲0.1	1,770	1.3	▲0.1
Die Heimat					437	0.3	▲0.1
GRAUEN					308	0.2	0.0
PBC					275	0.2	New
Independent	Marian Tutlewski	218	0.2	New			
REP					194	0.1	▼0.1
Informal votes		1,689			1,713		
Total valid votes		138,806			138,782		
Turnout		140,495	79.8	▼2.3			
SPD hold	Majority	3,870	2.8				
