= Sabine Poschmann =

German politician

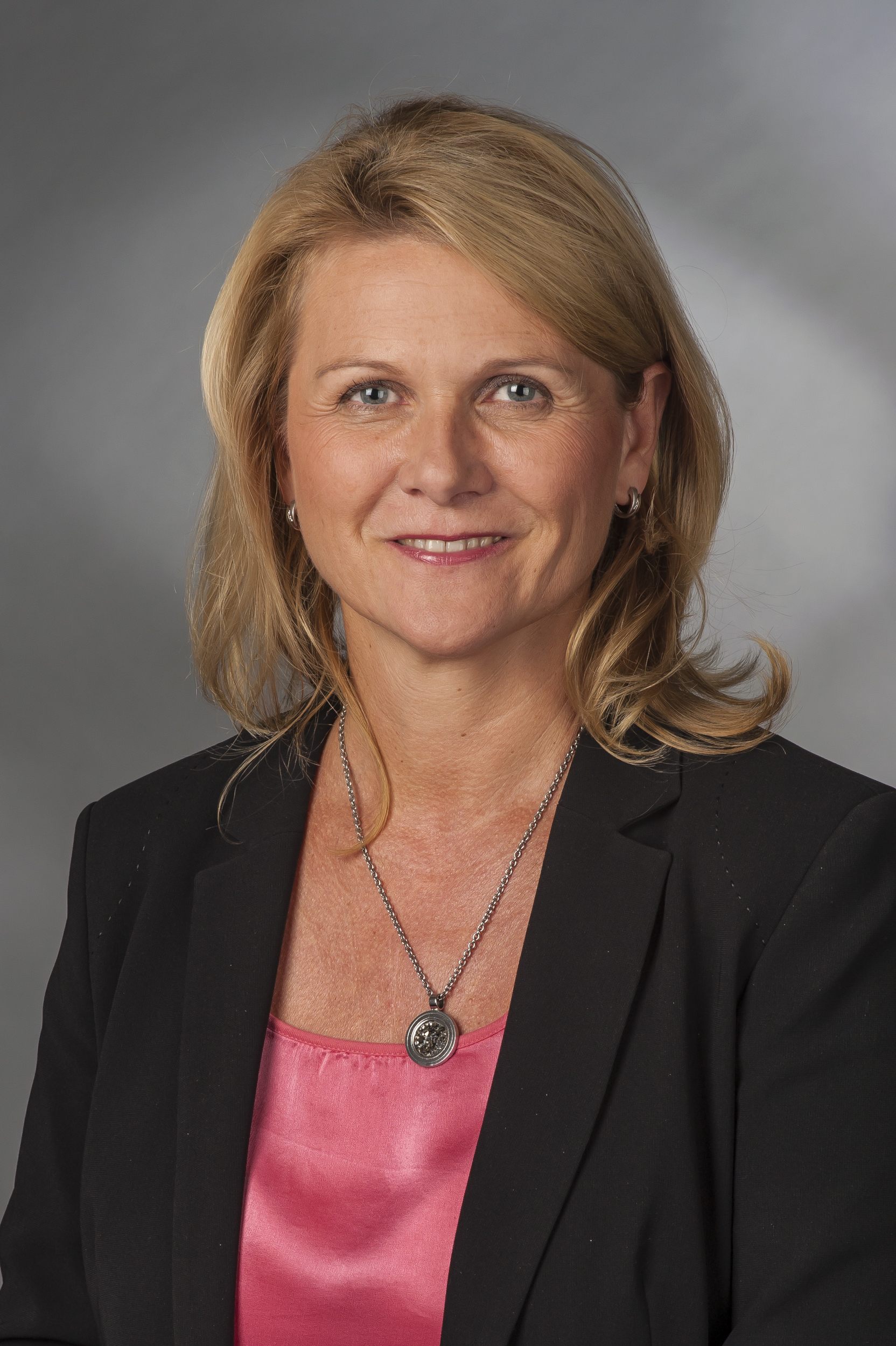
- Poschmann in 2014

Member of the Bundestag
- Incumbent
- Assumed office 2013
- Preceded by: Ulla Burchardt

Personal details
- Born: 4 October 1968 (age 57) Castrop-Rauxel, West Germany (now Germany)
- Party: SPD
- Children: 1

Sabine Poschmann (born 4 October 1968) is a German politician of the Social Democratic Party (SPD) who has been serving as a member of the Bundestag from the state of North Rhine-Westphalia since 2013.

In addition to her parliamentary work, Poschmann has been serving as Parliamentary State Secretary at the Federal Ministry for Housing, Urban Development and Building in the coalition government of Chancellor Friedrich Merz since 2025.

== Political career ==
Poschmann first became a member of the Bundestag in the 2013 German federal election, representing Dortmund. She is a member of the Committee on Economic Affairs and Energy. In this capacity, she is her parliamentary group's rapporteur on small and medium-sized enterprises and self-employment. She also served on the Subcommittee on Regional Development from 2014 until 2017.

In the negotiations to form a so-called traffic light coalition of the SPD, the Green Party and the Free Democratic Party (FDP) following the 2021 federal elections, Poschmann was part of her party's delegation in the working group on economic affairs, co-chaired by Carsten Schneider, Cem Özdemir and Michael Theurer.

Since the 2021 elections, Poschmann has been serving as her parliamentary group's spokesperson for sports.

== Other activities ==
- Business Forum of the Social Democratic Party of Germany, Member of the Political Advisory Board (since 2020)
