= Karl H. Fell =

German politician

Member of the Bundestag
- In office 1987–1996

Personal details
- Born: 16 December 1936 Erkelenz, West Germany (now Germany)
- Died: 5 December 1996 (aged 59) Bonn
- Party: CDU

Karl H. Fell was a German politician of the Christian Democratic Union (CDU) and former member of the German Bundestag.

== Life ==
In 1964 Fell became a member of the CDU. He was represented in numerous party committees. From 26 July 1970 to 29 May 1985, Fell was a member of the state parliament of North Rhine-Westphalia. He was directly elected. He was a member of the German Bundestag from 1987 until his death on 5 December 1996.
