= Cornelie Sonntag-Wolgast =

German politician and journalist (born 1942)

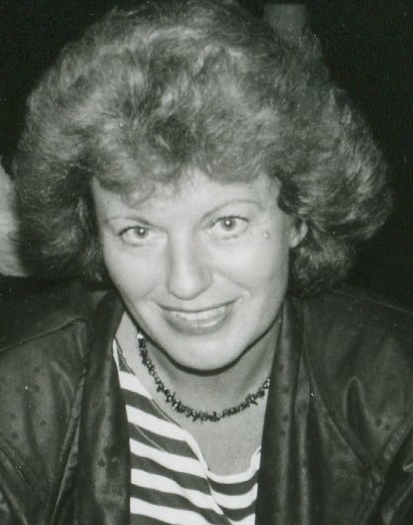
- Cornelie Sonntag-Wolgast around 1980

Member of the Bundestag
- In office 14 June 1988 – 18 October 2005
- Constituency: Steinburg – Dithmarschen Süd (1998–2005); Schleswig-Holstein (1990–1998)

Parliamentary State Secretary at the Federal Ministry of the Interior
- In office October 1998 – 2002

Chair of the Bundestag Committee on Internal Affairs
- In office 2002–2005

Personal details
- Born: Cornelie Sonntag; 29 August 1942 (age 84) Nuremberg, Gau Franconia, Nazi Germany
- Party: Social Democratic Party
- Spouse: Thomas Wolgast (m. 1969–2022)
- Education: University of Hamburg
- Occupation: Journalist, politician

Cornelie Sonntag-Wolgast (née Sonntag; born 29 August 1942) is a German journalist and politician of the Social Democratic Party (SPD). She was a member of the Bundestag from 14 June 1988 to October 2005, representing Schleswig-Holstein via the state list from 1990 and the Steinburg–Dithmarschen Süd constituency by direct mandate from 1998. She was Parliamentary State Secretary at the Federal Ministry of the Interior from 1998 to 2002 and chaired the Bundestag's Committee on Internal Affairs from 2002 to 2005.

== Early life and education ==
Sonntag-Wolgast was born in Nuremberg, the daughter of a merchant and a pianist, and grew up in Hamburg. She completed her Abitur in 1962 at the Charlotte-Paulsen-Gymnasium in the Hamburg district of Wandsbek, then studied German literature, comparative literature and musicology in Hamburg and Erlangen. In 1969 she received a doctorate from the University of Hamburg with a dissertation on the medieval text Sibots Frauenzucht.

== Journalism career ==
Sonntag-Wolgast trained as a journalist at the Hamburger Morgenpost and remained there as an editor. In 1972 she moved to Norddeutscher Rundfunk (NDR) as a freelance local reporter, becoming a salaried editor for state politics in 1975. She produced current-affairs programmes, presented political magazine shows and delivered on-air commentary, later serving as deputy head of the Zeitfunk unit in NDR's political department. She belonged to the media trade union IG Medien.

== Political career ==
Sonntag-Wolgast joined the SPD in 1971. In 1979 she was part of the campaign team of Klaus Matthiesen, the SPD's lead candidate in Schleswig-Holstein, and in 1987 she stood as the SPD's candidate in the Bundestag constituency of Steinburg–Dithmarschen Süd. From 1991 to 1993 she was spokesperson of the SPD's federal party executive.

=== Member of the Bundestag ===
On 14 June 1988 Sonntag-Wolgast entered the Bundestag as a successor to the outgoing member Heide Simonis. She returned via the Schleswig-Holstein state list in 1990 and 1994 and won the Steinburg–Dithmarschen Süd constituency directly in 1998. She left the Bundestag in October 2005.

She was a member of the Committee on Internal Affairs and a deputy member of the Transport Committee, later also deputy member of the Committee on Regional Planning, Building and Urban Development and of the Enquete Commission on "The Future of the Media in Business and Society". From 1994 to 1998 she was deputy spokesperson of the SPD parliamentary group's working group on internal affairs, and from 1997 she sat on the group's executive board. She was a delegate to the 9th, 10th, 11th and 12th Federal Conventions that elected the Federal President. Her committee work centred on migration and asylum policy and on media policy.

=== Parliamentary State Secretary ===
Sonntag-Wolgast was Parliamentary State Secretary at the Federal Ministry of the Interior under Interior Minister Otto Schily from October 1998 to 2002. In January 2000 she said Germany should consider a coordinated European or global approach to immigration policy, accounting for demographic change and the social insurance system, and argued against a national immigration law that encouraged inward migration given labour-market conditions at the time. During Bundestag debate on an immigration bill, she said Germany needed time and a European framework, while deputising for Schily, who was attending an event in Munich.

She is quoted in an academic case study of the 2000–2001 Independent Commission on Immigration chaired by Rita Süssmuth. In May 2000, after several human rights organisations declined to attend a government "Alliance for Democracy and Tolerance" event over deportation policy, Sonntag-Wolgast said she regretted the absences.

=== Chair of the Committee on Internal Affairs ===
Sonntag-Wolgast chaired the Bundestag's Committee on Internal Affairs from 2002 until she left parliament in 2005. In November 2002 she said she saw no route toward withdrawing Germany's reservation to the Convention on the Rights of the Child, citing state-government concerns that removing it could increase the number of children sent to Germany for economic reasons. In January 2005, after German states agreed to attach language and self-sufficiency conditions to the free immigration of Jewish immigrants from the former Soviet Union, she said she understood the reasoning behind the conditions but asked for more time given the sensitivity of the issue, adding that Germany's capacity to integrate new arrivals had not been fully used.

== Later activities ==
Sonntag-Wolgast appeared as a guest commentator on political television programmes, including Unter den Linden and Talk vor Mitternacht in 2003 and Münchner Runde in 2004. In 2008 she published a book, Willst du dir das wirklich antun? (Do You Really Want to Do This to Yourself?).

== Personal life ==
Sonntag-Wolgast married the journalist Thomas Wolgast (1943–2022) in 1969 until his death. She divides her time between Spain and Germany's North Sea coast and plays the violin.
