= Christine Kurzhals =

German politician (1950–1998)

- Official portrait, 1994

Member of the Bundestag for Saxony
- In office 10 November 1994 – 4 May 1998
- Succeeded by: Jens Heinzig
- Constituency: State list

Personal details
- Born: Christine Mierl; 31 May 1950 Böhlen, Saxony, East Germany
- Died: 4 May 1998 (aged 47) Leipzig, Saxony, Germany
- Party: Independent (until 1989); SPD (GDR) (1989–1990); SPD (after 1990)
- Spouse: Herr Kurzhals
- Children: 2

Christine Kurzhals (née Mierl; 31 May 1950 – 4 May 1998) was a German engineer and politician who served in the Bundestag from 1994 until her death in 1998. A member of the Social Democratic Party from Saxony, she was prominent for her role in the inner reunification process.

== Biography ==
Christine Kurzhals (née Mierl) was born on 31 May 1950 in the town of Böhlen in Saxony, then part of East Germany. She took an apprenticeship as a mechanical draftsman after completing secondary school, working for three years. She later attended a technical college, receiving a degree in chemical engineering and further qualifications in surveying technology. After graduating, Kurzhals worked as a surveying technician for five years and then as an engineer at a chemical plant for three years. She also lectured students in surveying technology. Kurzhals was married with two children.

Kurzhals was politically unaffiliated until 1989, when she joined the newly-formed East German Social Democratic Party (SPD). In December 1989, she co-founded the SPD branch in the town of Borna, serving as its chair and a member of the executive committee. At some point, she was also a member of the local city council. In 1990, she began working as a lay judge at the district court in Borna.

In the 1994 election, Kurzhals was elected to the Bundestag on the unified SPD's state list. She was a member of the Committees on Labour and Social Affairs; Family, Seniors, Women and Youth; Transport; and Posts and Telecommunications. She was also a member of the advisory board of the Regulatory Authority for Telecommunications and Postal Services, the regulatory council at the Federal Ministry of Posts and Telecommunications, and the board of trustees of the Federal Agency for Civic Education. Kurzhals was most prominent for her role in the inner reunification process, being involved in the integration of the dissolved National People's Army of East Germany and serving as a deputy member of the Enquete Commission on Overcoming the Consequences of the SED Dictatorship in the Process of German Unification.

Kurzhals died in office on 4 May 1998 in Leipzig. She was succeeded by Jens Heinzig, and was eulogized in the Bundestag by its president Rita Süssmuth.
