= Heinz Lanfermann =

German politician (1950–2024)

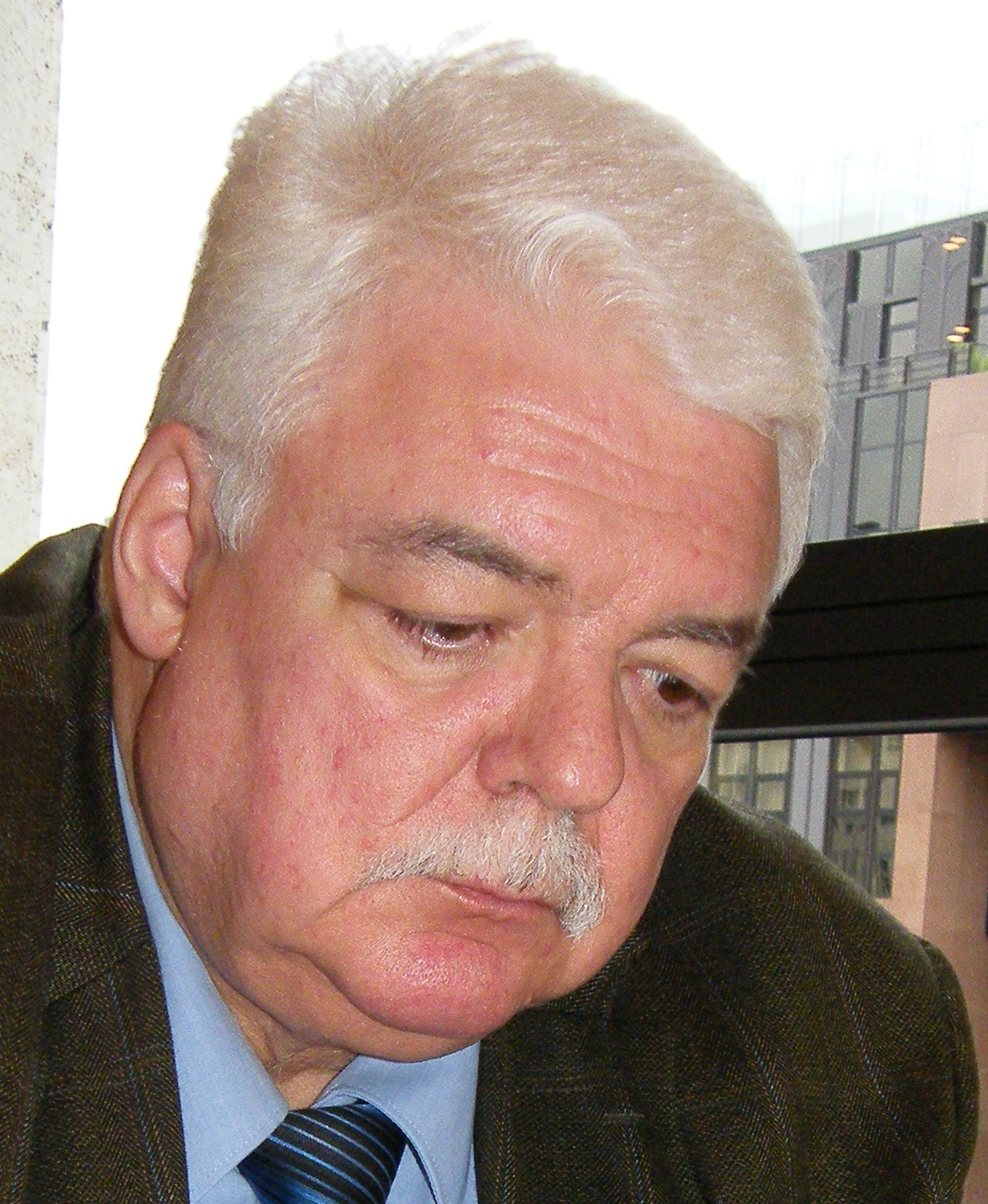
- Lanfermann in 2010

Member of the Bundestag for the FDP Bundestag faction
- In office 18 October 2005 – 22 October 2013
- In office 10 November 1994 – 7 February 1996

Personal details
- Born: 27 May 1950 Oberhausen, North Rhine-Westphalia, West Germany
- Died: 21 June 2024 (aged 74) Potsdam, Brandenburg, Germany
- Party: FDP
- Education: University of Bonn
- Occupation: Lawyer

Heinz Lanfermann (27 May 1950 – 21 June 2024) was a German politician. A member of the Free Democratic Party, he served in the Bundestag from 1994 to 1996 and again from 2005 to 2013.

Lanfermann died in Potsdam on 21 June 2024, at the age of 74.
