= Helga Kühn-Mengel =

German politician (born 1947)

Federal Government Commissioner for Patient Affairs
- In office 2004–2009

Member of the German Bundestag
- In office 1996–2009

Personal details
- Born: 1 July 1947 (age 79) Duisburg, Germany
- Party: Social Democratic Party

Helga Kühn-Mengel née Kühn (born 1 July 1947 in Duisburg) is a German politician. She was a Member of the German Bundestag from 1996 to 2009 and from 2013 to 2017 and Federal Government Commissioner for Patient Affairs from 2004 to 2009.

== Life and education ==
After graduating from Abitur in 1967 from Erzbischöfliches Gymnasium in Brühl, Kühn-Mengel studied psychology at University of Cologne, which she completed in 1972 with a Diplom degree in psychology. She then worked in Cologne, first at the research association "Das körperbehinderte Kind" and then at the Centre for Early Intervention and Early Treatment.

Kühn-Mengel is married and has three children.

== Political career ==
She has been a member of the SPD since 1972 and has been honorary chairwoman of the Brühl local SPD association since 2004.

Kühn-Mengel has been a member of the district council of the Rhein-Erft-Kreis since 1984.

On 23 December 1996, she replaced Dietmar Thieser in the German Bundestag.

From 1998 to 2002 she was Commissioner for the Disabled and from October 2002 to January 2004 she was spokesperson for the SPD German Bundestag working group on health and social security. She was also a member of the SPD parliamentary group executive from November 2002 to November 2004. Kühn-Mengel always ran on the state list North Rhine-Westphalia into the Bundestag.

In the 2009 Bundestag election, Kühn-Mengel was defeated by Detlef Seif in the Euskirchen - Erftkreis II constituency (CDU) and also failed to re-enter the Bundestag via the state list.

Kühn-Mengel was re-elected as a candidate in 2012 at the constituency assembly of her Bundestag constituency. Her opponent Melanie Taprogge was clearly defeated.

In the 2013 Bundestag election, she succeeded via the state list North Rhine-Westphalia to re-enter the Bundestag.

== Public offices ==
On 1 January 2004, she was appointed to the newly created office of Federal Government Commissioner for Patients' Affairs. Her successor on 19 November 2009 was Wolfgang Zöller (CSU) was appointed as her successor on 19 November 2009.

In the 18th legislative period of the German Bundestag, which began in 2013, she was a member of the Committee on Health.

== Honours ==
Kühn-Mengel was honoured with the Marie-Juchacz-Plakette of the Workers' Welfare Association (AWO), where she was Chairwoman of the AWO Regional Association Rhein-Erft and Euskirchen and sits on the Federal Executive Committee on an honorary basis.

On 14 June 2012, she was awarded the Federal Cross of Merit on Ribbon in Berlin.
