= Gerd Bauer =

German politician (1950–2023)

Member of the Landtag of Saarland
- In office 9 November 1994 – 16 September 2001
- Succeeded by: Bernd Wegner

Personal details
- Born: 30 August 1950 Saarbrücken, Saar Protectorate
- Died: 24 August 2023 (aged 72)
- Party: CDU
- Education: Saarland University

Gerd Bauer (30 August 1950 – 24 August 2023) was a German politician. A member of the Christian Democratic Union, he served in the Landtag of Saarland from 1994 to 2001.

Bauer died on 24 August 2023, at the age of 72.
