= Manfred Müller (politician) =

German politician (1943–2025)

Member of the Bundestag for Berlin-Hohenschönhausen – Pankow – Weißensee
- In office 10 November 1994 – 17 October 2002

Personal details
- Born: 27 February 1943; Weißensee, Germany
- Died: June 2025 (aged 82)
- Political party: PDS

Manfred Müller (27 February 1943 – June 2025) was a German politician who was a member of the Party of Democratic Socialism, he served in the Bundestag from 1994 to 2002.

Müller died in June 2025, at the age of 82.
