= Wolfgang Weiermann =

German politician (1935–2021)

Wolfgang Weiermann (8 September 1935 – 17 May 2021) was a German politician for the SPD.

== Life and politics ==
Weiermann was born 1935 in Dortmund and was a steelworker and member of the IG Metall, the world's biggest industry union. Weiermann was a council member for the city of Dortmund from 1969 to 1987. He was a member of the German Bundestag from 1987 to 2002. In parliament he represented the Dortmund II constituency. In the late-1990s, he was a member of the Bundestag Committee on Economics and Technology.

Weiermann became a member of the SPD in 1955, and was a member of the German Bundestag, the federal diet, from 1987 to 2002.
