= Jürgen Koppelin =

German politician (born 1945)

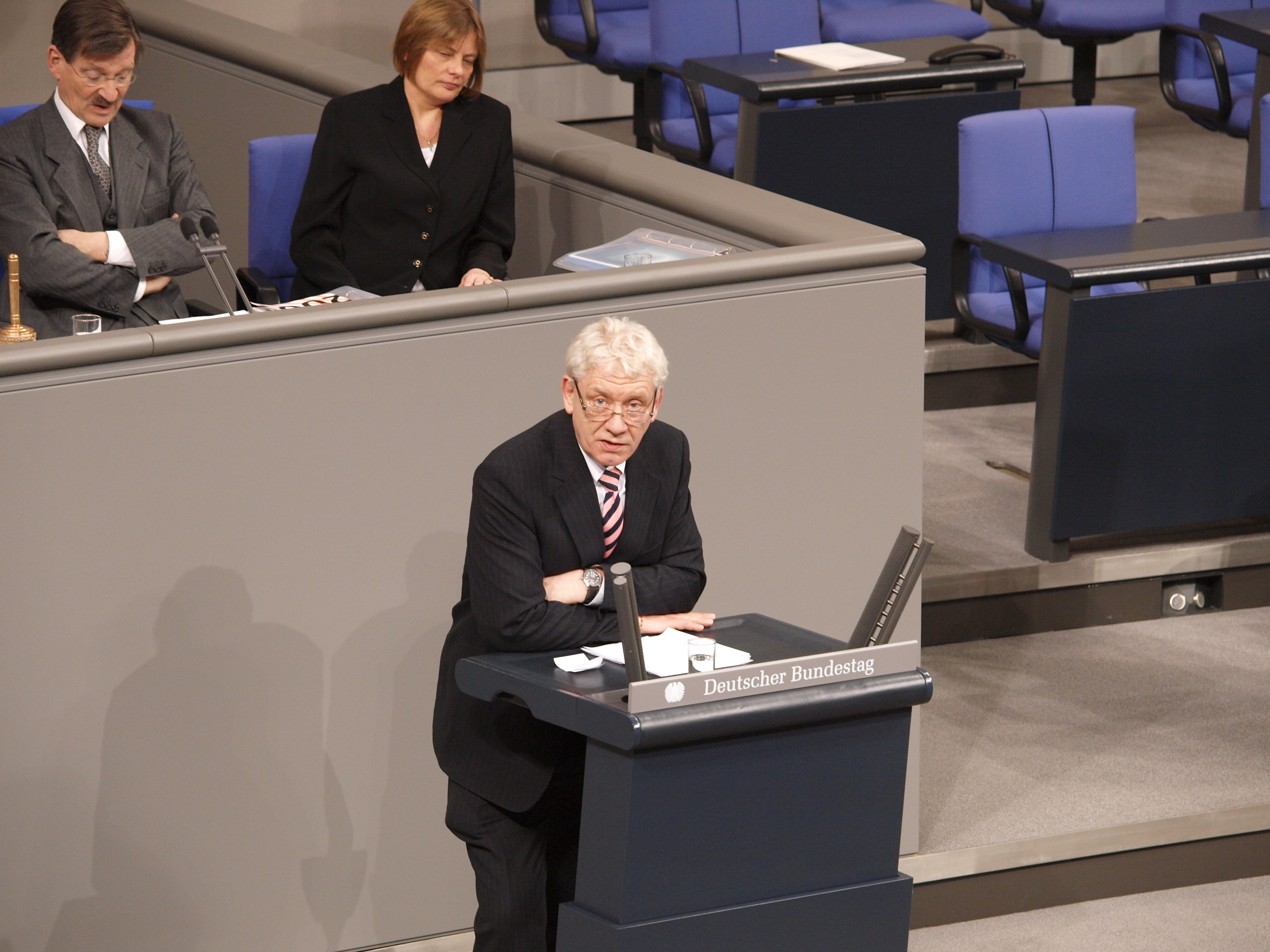
Jürgen Koppelin speaking in the Bundestag

Jürgen Koppelin (born 14 September 1945) is a German politician (FDP) who was a member of the Bundestag, the German parliament, from 1990 to 2013.

== Early career ==
Koppelin was born in Wesselburen. He is a banker by profession. From 1965 to 1969 he served in the German Luftwaffe.

== Political career ==
Koppelin has been a member of his party since 1962. He was Parliamentary Manager for the FDP parliamentary group and speaker for fiscal politics from 1998 to 2009. In addition, he was deputy chairman of the FDP parliamentary group from October 2009 to May 2011. Koppelin acted as chairman of his party in Schleswig-Holstein from 1993 to November 2011.

== Other activities ==
- TellSell Consulting, member of the advisory board
