= Rolf Koschorrek =

German politician (1956–2020)

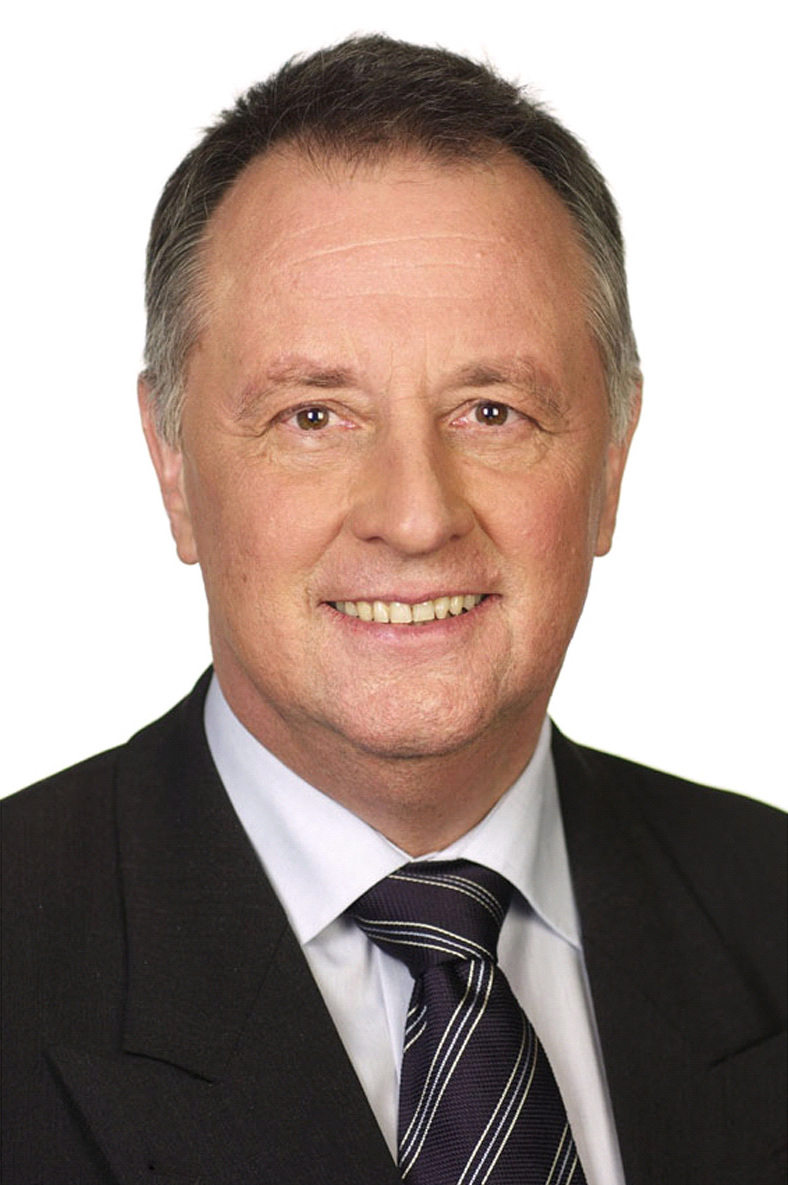
Koschorrek (2010)

Rolf Koschorrek (17 June 1956 - 12 January 2020) was a German politician and a member of the Christian Democratic Union of Germany (CDU) party from 1983.

Koschorrek was born in Bad Bramstedt, West Germany. After studying Dentistry in Göttingen, he worked as a dental technician and dentist, becoming a politician in 1990. From 2005 until 2013 he was a member of the German Bundestag. In 2013 Koschorrek was not re-nominated as a member of the Bundestag for his electoral district, apparently because of his many other commitments.

Koschorrek was the father of one daughter. He died in Berlin, aged 63.
