= Ulla Burchardt =

German politician and member of the SPD

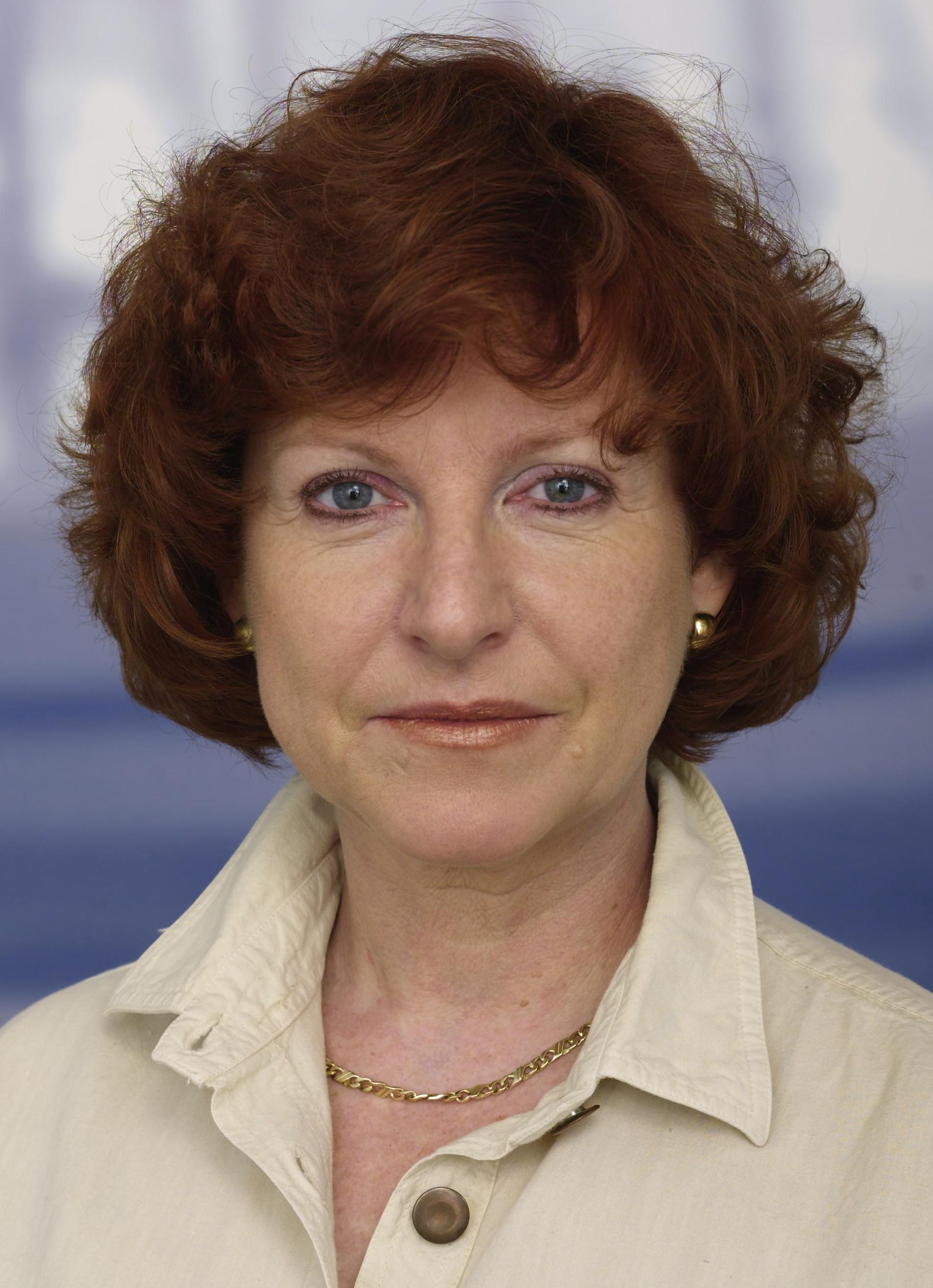
Ulla Burchardt

Ursula "Ulla" Burchardt (born 22 April 1954 in Dortmund, North Rhine-Westphalia) is a German politician and member of the SPD.

== Political career ==
Burchardt was first elected to the German Bundestag in the 1994 elections. Throughout her time in parliament, she was a member of the Committee on Education, Research and Technology; from 2009, she served as the committee's chairwoman.

In addition to her committee assignments, Burchardt also served as chairwoman of the German-Italian Parliamentary Friendship Group from 2003 until 2013. She did not run for re-election in the 2013 elections.

== Other activities ==
- Friedrich Ebert Foundation (FES), Member of the Board of Trustees
- Max Planck Institute of Molecular Physiology, Member of the Board of Trustees
- Technische Universität Berlin, Member of the Board of Trustees (since 2016)
- German Council for Sustainable Development (RNE), Member (2016–2022, appointed ad personam by Chancellor Angela Merkel)
- German National Association for Student Affairs, Member of the Board of Trustees (2009-2013)
- Berlin Social Science Center (WZB), Member of the Board of Trustees (2002-2013)
