= List of members of the 14th Bundestag =

14th Bundestag
| ← | 13th | 15th | → |
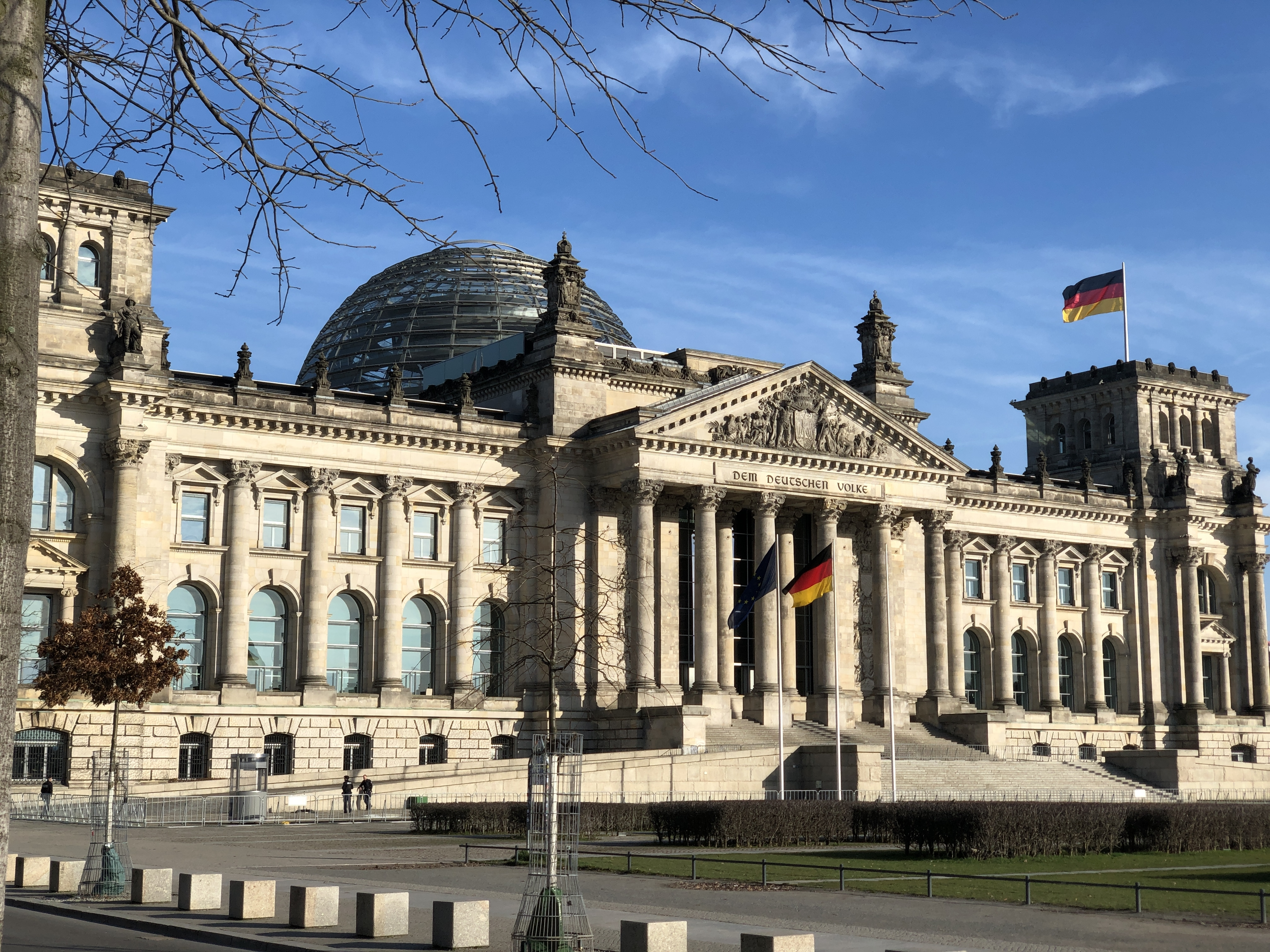
- Reichstag building in 2020

Overview
- Legislative body: Bundestag
- Jurisdiction: Germany
- Meeting place: Reichstag building, Berlin

Bundestag
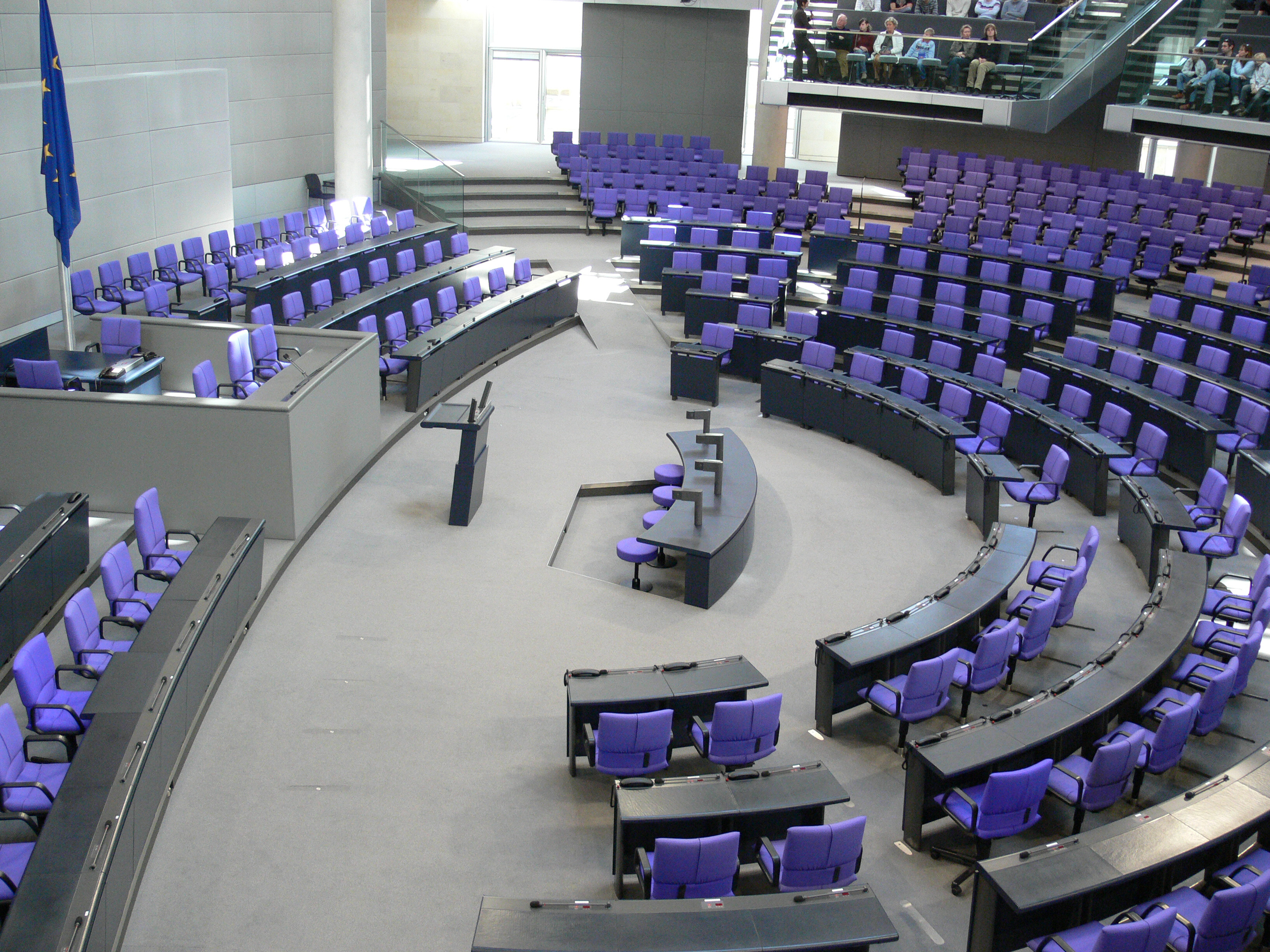
- Members: 666

This is a list of members of the 14th Bundestag – the lower house of parliament of the Federal Republic of Germany, whose members were in office from 1998 until 2002.

== Summary ==
This summary includes changes in the numbers of the five caucuses (CDU/CSU, SPD, Greens, FDP, Party of Democratic Socialism):

| Time | Reason of change | SPD | CDU/CSU | Greens | FDP | PDS | Others | Total number |
|---|---|---|---|---|---|---|---|---|
| 1998 | First meeting | 298 | 245 | 47 | 43 | 36 | | 669 |
| 5 October 1999 | Uwe Hiksch leaves the SPD caucus and becomes member of PDS | 297 | 245 | 47 | 43 | 37 | | 669 |
| 9 August 2000 | Ilse Schumann dies; her seat is vacated permanently because it is an overhang seat | 296 | 245 | 47 | 43 | 37 | | 668 |
| 6 June 2001 | Olaf Scholz resigns; his seat is vacated permanently because it is an overhang seat | 295 | 245 | 47 | 43 | 37 | | 667 |
| 30 June 2001 | Eberhard Brecht resigns; his seat is vacated permanently because it is an overhang seat | 294 | 245 | 47 | 43 | 37 | | 666 |
| 15 November 2001 | Christa Lörcher leaves the SPD caucus and becomes unaffiliated | 293 | 245 | 47 | 43 | 37 | 1 | 666 |

== Members ==
| State | No. | Constituency | Member | Party |
|---|---|---|---|---|
| Schleswig-Holstein | 1 | Flensburg – Schleswig | Wolfgang Wodarg | SPD |
| Schleswig-Holstein | 2 | Nordfriesland – Dithmarschen-Nord | Manfred Opel | SPD |
| Schleswig-Holstein | 3 | Steinburg – Dithmarschen-Süd | Cornelie Sonntag-Wolgast | SPD |
| Schleswig-Holstein | 4 | Rendsburg-Eckernförde | Ulrike Mehl | SPD |
| Schleswig-Holstein | 5 | Kiel | Hans-Peter Bartels | SPD |
| Schleswig-Holstein | 6 | Plön – Neumünster | Michael Bürsch | SPD |
| Schleswig-Holstein | 7 | Pinneberg | Ernst Dieter Rossmann | SPD |
| Schleswig-Holstein | 8 | Segeberg – Stormarn-Nord | Franz Thönnes | SPD |
| Schleswig-Holstein | 9 | Ostholstein | Antje-Marie Steen | SPD |
| Schleswig-Holstein | 10 | Herzogtum Lauenburg – Stormarn-Süd | Thomas Sauer | SPD |
| Schleswig-Holstein | 11 | Lübeck | Reinhold Hiller | SPD |
| Schleswig-Holstein | List | | Dietrich Austermann | CDU |
| Schleswig-Holstein | List | | Otto Bernhardt | CDU |
| Schleswig-Holstein | List | | Wolfgang Börnsen | CDU |
| Schleswig-Holstein | List | | Peter Harry Carstensen | CDU |
| Schleswig-Holstein | List | | Anke Eymer | CDU |
| Schleswig-Holstein | List | | Michael von Schmude | CDU |
| Schleswig-Holstein | List | | Angelika Volquartz | CDU |
| Schleswig-Holstein | List | | Gert Willner (Note: Gert Willner died on 23 March 2000.) | CDU |
| Schleswig-Holstein | List | | Peter Kurt Würzbach | CDU |
| Schleswig-Holstein | List | | Helmut Lamp (Note: Helmut Lamp took office on 28 March 2000, to succeed Gert Willner.) | CDU |
| Schleswig-Holstein | List | | Jürgen Koppelin | FDP |
| Schleswig-Holstein | List | | Edzard Schmidt-Jortzig | FDP |
| Schleswig-Holstein | List | | Angelika Beer | Greens |
| Schleswig-Holstein | List | | Klaus Müller (Note: Klaus Müller resigned on 31 March 2000.) | Greens |
| Schleswig-Holstein | List | | Grietje Staffelt (Note: Grietje Staffelt took office on 3 April 2000, to succeed Klaus Müller.) | Greens |
| Hamburg | 12 | Hamburg-Mitte | Johannes Kahrs | SPD |
| Hamburg | 13 | Hamburg-Altona | Olaf Scholz (Note: Olaf Scholz resigned on 6 June 2001.) | SPD |
| Hamburg | 14 | Hamburg-Eimsbüttel | Angelika Mertens | SPD |
| Hamburg | 15 | Hamburg-Nord | Anke Hartnagel | SPD |
| Hamburg | 16 | Hamburg-Wandsbek | Peter Zumkley | SPD |
| Hamburg | 17 | Hamburg-Bergedorf | Rolf Niese | SPD |
| Hamburg | 18 | Hamburg-Harburg | Hans-Ulrich Klose | SPD |
| Hamburg | List | | Dirk Fischer | CDU |
| Hamburg | List | | Volker Rühe | CDU |
| Hamburg | List | | Birgit Schnieber-Jastram (Note: Birgit Schnieber-Jastram resigned on 7 November 2001.) | CDU |
| Hamburg | List | | Gunnar Uldall (Note: Gunnar Uldall resigned on 6 November 2001.) | CDU |
| Hamburg | List | | Klaus Francke (Note: Klaus Francke took office on 7 November 2001, to succeed Gunnar Uldall.) | CDU |
| Hamburg | List | | Antje Blumenthal (Note: Antje Blumenthal took office on 8 November 2001, to succeed Birgit Schnieber-Jastram.) | CDU |
| Hamburg | List | | Kristin Heyne (Note: Kristin Heyne died on 30 January 2002.) | Greens |
| Hamburg | List | | Amke Dietert-Scheuer (Note: Amke Dietert-Scheuer took office on 5 February 2002, to succeed Kristin Heyne.) | Greens |
| Hamburg | List | | Rainer Funke | FDP |
| Lower Saxony | 19 | Aurich – Emden | Jann-Peter Janssen | SPD |
| Lower Saxony | 20 | Unterems | Rudolf Seiters | CDU |
| Lower Saxony | 21 | Friesland – Wilhelmshaven | Gabriele Iwersen | SPD |
| Lower Saxony | 22 | Oldenburg – Ammerland | Dietmar Schütz (Note: Dietmar Schütz resigned on 31 October 2001.) | SPD |
| Lower Saxony | 23 | Delmenhorst – Wesermarsch – Oldenburg-Land | Holger Ortel | SPD |
| Lower Saxony | 24 | Cuxhaven | Annette Faße | SPD |
| Lower Saxony | 25 | Stade – Rotenburg I | Margrit Wetzel | SPD |
| Lower Saxony | 26 | Mittelems | Hermann Kues | CDU |
| Lower Saxony | 27 | Cloppenburg – Vechta | Manfred Carstens | CDU |
| Lower Saxony | 28 | Diepholz | Detlev von Larcher | SPD |
| Lower Saxony | 29 | Verden – Osterholz | Joachim Stünker | SPD |
| Lower Saxony | 30 | Soltau-Fallingbostel – Rotenburg II | Kurt Palis | SPD |
| Lower Saxony | 31 | Lüneburg – Lüchow-Dannenberg | Arne Fuhrmann | SPD |
| Lower Saxony | 32 | Osnabrück-Land | Reinhard von Schorlemer | CDU |
| Lower Saxony | 33 | Stadt Osnabrück | Ernst Schwanhold | SPD |
| Lower Saxony | 34 | Nienburg – Schaumburg | Sebastian Edathy | SPD |
| Lower Saxony | 35 | Harburg | Monika Griefahn | SPD |
| Lower Saxony | 36 | Stadt Hannover I | Gerd Andres | SPD |
| Lower Saxony | 37 | Stadt Hannover II | Edelgard Bulmahn | SPD |
| Lower Saxony | 38 | Hannover-Land I | Monika Ganseforth | SPD |
| Lower Saxony | 39 | Celle – Uelzen | Peter Struck | SPD |
| Lower Saxony | 40 | Gifhorn – Peine | Hubertus Heil | SPD |
| Lower Saxony | 41 | Hameln-Pyrmont – Holzminden | Brigitte Schulte | SPD |
| Lower Saxony | 42 | Hannover-Land II | Horst Schild | SPD |
| Lower Saxony | 43 | Hildesheim | Bernhard Brinkmann | SPD |
| Lower Saxony | 44 | Salzgitter – Wolfenbüttel | Wilhelm Schmidt | SPD |
| Lower Saxony | 45 | Braunschweig | Leyla Onur | SPD |
| Lower Saxony | 46 | Helmstedt – Wolfsburg | Bodo Seidenthal | SPD |
| Lower Saxony | 47 | Goslar | Peter Eckardt | SPD |
| Lower Saxony | 48 | Northeim – Osterode | Edith Niehuis | SPD |
| Lower Saxony | 49 | Göttingen | Inge Wettig-Danielmeier | SPD |
| Lower Saxony | List | | Sylvia Bonitz | CDU |
| Lower Saxony | List | | Hans Georg Faust | CDU |
| Lower Saxony | List | | Jochen-Konrad Fromme | CDU |
| Lower Saxony | List | | Kurt-Dieter Grill | CDU |
| Lower Saxony | List | | Carl-Detlev Freiherr von Hammerstein | CDU |
| Lower Saxony | List | | Klaus-Jürgen Hedrich | CDU |
| Lower Saxony | List | | Karl-Heinz Hornhues | CDU |
| Lower Saxony | List | | Dietmar Kansy | CDU |
| Lower Saxony | List | | Eckart von Klaeden | CDU |
| Lower Saxony | List | | Eva-Maria Kors | CDU |
| Lower Saxony | List | | Thomas Kossendey | CDU |
| Lower Saxony | List | | Martina Krogmann | CDU |
| Lower Saxony | List | | Walter Link | CDU |
| Lower Saxony | List | | Erich Maaß | CDU |
| Lower Saxony | List | | Friedbert Pflüger | CDU |
| Lower Saxony | List | | Marlies Pretzlaff | CDU |
| Lower Saxony | List | | Heinrich-Wilhelm Ronsöhr | CDU |
| Lower Saxony | List | | Erika Schuchardt | CDU |
| Lower Saxony | List | | Werner Siemann | CDU |
| Lower Saxony | List | | Rita Süssmuth | CDU |
| Lower Saxony | List | | Hans Forster | SPD |
| Lower Saxony | List | | Günter Graf | SPD |
| Lower Saxony | List | | Monika Heubaum | SPD |
| Lower Saxony | List | | Volker Neumann | SPD |
| Lower Saxony | List | | Reinhold Robbe | SPD |
| Lower Saxony | List | | Gerhard Schröder | SPD |
| Lower Saxony | List | | Hedi Wegener | SPD |
| Lower Saxony | List | | Heino Wiese | SPD |
| Lower Saxony | List | | Carola Reimann (Note: Carola Reimann took office on 22 February 2000, to succeed Ernst Schwanhold.) | SPD |
| Lower Saxony | List | | Gabriele Lösekrug-Möller (Note: Gabriele Lösekrug-Möller took office on 1 November 2001, to succeed Dietmar Schütz.) | SPD |
| Lower Saxony | List | | Hans-Michael Goldmann | FDP |
| Lower Saxony | List | | Walter Hirche | FDP |
| Lower Saxony | List | | Ina Lenke | FDP |
| Lower Saxony | List | | Carl-Ludwig Thiele | FDP |
| Lower Saxony | List | | Gila Altmann | Greens |
| Lower Saxony | List | | Thea Dückert | Greens |
| Lower Saxony | List | | Helmut Lippelt | Greens |
| Lower Saxony | List | | Jürgen Trittin | Greens |
| Lower Saxony | List | | Heidi Lippmann | PDS |
| Bremen | 50 | Bremen-Ost | Volker Kröning | SPD |
| Bremen | 51 | Bremen-West | Konrad Kunick | SPD |
| Bremen | 52 | Bremerhaven – Bremen-Nord | Ilse Janz | SPD |
| Bremen | List | | Bernd Neumann | CDU |
| Bremen | List | | Marieluise Beck | Greens |
| North Rhine-Westphalia | 53 | Aachen | Ulla Schmidt | SPD |
| North Rhine-Westphalia | 54 | Kreis Aachen | Achim Großmann | SPD |
| North Rhine-Westphalia | 55 | Heinsberg | Leo Dautzenberg | CDU |
| North Rhine-Westphalia | 56 | Düren | Dietmar Nietan | SPD |
| North Rhine-Westphalia | 57 | Erftkreis I | Klaus Lennartz | SPD |
| North Rhine-Westphalia | 58 | Euskirchen – Erftkreis II | Wolf Bauer | CDU |
| North Rhine-Westphalia | 59 | Cologne I | Volkmar Schultz | SPD |
| North Rhine-Westphalia | 60 | Cologne II | Anke Fuchs | SPD |
| North Rhine-Westphalia | 61 | Cologne III | Konrad Gilges | SPD |
| North Rhine-Westphalia | 62 | Cologne IV | Günter Oesinghaus | SPD |
| North Rhine-Westphalia | 63 | Bonn | Norbert Hauser (Note: Norbert Hauser resigned on 9 April 2002.) | CDU |
| North Rhine-Westphalia | 64 | Rhein-Sieg-Kreis I | Uwe Göllner | SPD |
| North Rhine-Westphalia | 65 | Rhein-Sieg-Kreis II | Norbert Röttgen | CDU |
| North Rhine-Westphalia | 66 | Oberbergischer Kreis | Friedhelm Julius Beucher | SPD |
| North Rhine-Westphalia | 67 | Rheinisch-Bergischer Kreis I | Wolfgang Bosbach | CDU |
| North Rhine-Westphalia | 68 | Leverkusen – Rheinisch-Bergischer Kreis II | Ernst Küchler | SPD |
| North Rhine-Westphalia | 69 | Wuppertal I | Rudolf Dreßler (Note: Rudolf Dreßler resigned on 31 August 2000.) | SPD |
| North Rhine-Westphalia | 70 | Wuppertal II | Willfried Penner (Note: Willfried Penner resigned on 11 May 2000.) | SPD |
| North Rhine-Westphalia | 71 | Solingen – Remscheid | Hans-Werner Bertl | SPD |
| North Rhine-Westphalia | 72 | Mettmann I | Lilo Friedrich | SPD |
| North Rhine-Westphalia | 73 | Mettmann II | Regina Schmidt-Zadel | SPD |
| North Rhine-Westphalia | 74 | Düsseldorf I | Michael Müller | SPD |
| North Rhine-Westphalia | 75 | Düsseldorf II | Volker Jung | SPD |
| North Rhine-Westphalia | 76 | Neuss I | Hermann Gröhe | CDU |
| North Rhine-Westphalia | 77 | Neuss II | Willy Wimmer | CDU |
| North Rhine-Westphalia | 78 | Mönchengladbach | Hildegard Wester | SPD |
| North Rhine-Westphalia | 79 | Krefeld | Bernd Scheelen | SPD |
| North Rhine-Westphalia | 80 | Viersen | Julius Louven | CDU |
| North Rhine-Westphalia | 81 | Kleve | Ronald Pofalla | CDU |
| North Rhine-Westphalia | 82 | Wesel I | Uwe Jens | SPD |
| North Rhine-Westphalia | 83 | Wesel II | Peter Enders | SPD |
| North Rhine-Westphalia | 84 | Duisburg I | Helmut Wieczorek | SPD |
| North Rhine-Westphalia | 85 | Duisburg II | Johannes Pflug | SPD |
| North Rhine-Westphalia | 86 | Oberhausen | Wolfgang Grotthaus | SPD |
| North Rhine-Westphalia | 87 | Mülheim | Dieter Schloten | SPD |
| North Rhine-Westphalia | 88 | Essen I | Hans-Günter Bruckmann | SPD |
| North Rhine-Westphalia | 89 | Essen II | Rolf Hempelmann | SPD |
| North Rhine-Westphalia | 90 | Essen III | Ingrid Becker-Inglau | SPD |
| North Rhine-Westphalia | 91 | Recklinghausen I | Jochen Welt | SPD |
| North Rhine-Westphalia | 92 | Recklinghausen II – Borken I | Waltraud Lehn | SPD |
| North Rhine-Westphalia | 93 | Gelsenkirchen I | Joachim Poß | SPD |
| North Rhine-Westphalia | 94 | Gelsenkirchen II – Recklinghausen III | Norbert Formanski | SPD |
| North Rhine-Westphalia | 95 | Bottrop – Recklinghausen IV | Dieter Grasedieck | SPD |
| North Rhine-Westphalia | 96 | Borken II | Elke Wülfing | CDU |
| North Rhine-Westphalia | 97 | Coesfeld – Steinfurt I | Werner Lensing | CDU |
| North Rhine-Westphalia | 98 | Steinfurt II | Reinhold Hemker | SPD |
| North Rhine-Westphalia | 99 | Münster | Ruprecht Polenz | CDU |
| North Rhine-Westphalia | 100 | Warendorf | Peter Paziorek | CDU |
| North Rhine-Westphalia | 101 | Gütersloh | Hubert Deittert | CDU |
| North Rhine-Westphalia | 102 | Bielefeld | Rainer Wend | SPD |
| North Rhine-Westphalia | 103 | Herford – Minden-Lübbecke I | Wolfgang Spanier | SPD |
| North Rhine-Westphalia | 104 | Minden-Lübbecke II | Lothar Ibrügger | SPD |
| North Rhine-Westphalia | 105 | Lippe I | Karl Hermann Haack | SPD |
| North Rhine-Westphalia | 106 | Höxter – Lippe II | Meinolf Michels | CDU |
| North Rhine-Westphalia | 107 | Paderborn | Friedhelm Ost | CDU |
| North Rhine-Westphalia | 108 | Hagen | René Röspel | SPD |
| North Rhine-Westphalia | 109 | Ennepe-Ruhr-Kreis I | Adolf Ostertag | SPD |
| North Rhine-Westphalia | 110 | Bochum I | Klaus Hasenfratz | SPD |
| North Rhine-Westphalia | 111 | Bochum II – Ennepe-Ruhr-Kreis II | Christel Humme | SPD |
| North Rhine-Westphalia | 112 | Herne – Bochum III | Dieter Maaß | SPD |
| North Rhine-Westphalia | 113 | Dortmund I | Hans-Eberhard Urbaniak | SPD |
| North Rhine-Westphalia | 114 | Dortmund II | Wolfgang Weiermann | SPD |
| North Rhine-Westphalia | 115 | Dortmund III | Ulla Burchardt | SPD |
| North Rhine-Westphalia | 116 | Unna I | Rolf Stöckel | SPD |
| North Rhine-Westphalia | 117 | Hamm – Unna II | Dieter Wiefelspütz | SPD |
| North Rhine-Westphalia | 118 | Soest | Eike Hovermann | SPD |
| North Rhine-Westphalia | 119 | Hochsauerlandkreis | Friedrich Merz | CDU |
| North Rhine-Westphalia | 120 | Siegen-Wittgenstein I | Marianne Klappert | SPD |
| North Rhine-Westphalia | 121 | Olpe – Siegen-Wittgenstein II | Hartmut Schauerte | CDU |
| North Rhine-Westphalia | 122 | Märkischer Kreis I | Dagmar Freitag | SPD |
| North Rhine-Westphalia | 123 | Märkischer Kreis II | Dieter Dzewas | SPD |
| North Rhine-Westphalia | List | | Joseph-Theodor Blank | CDU |
| North Rhine-Westphalia | List | | Heribert Blens | CDU |
| North Rhine-Westphalia | List | | Norbert Blüm | CDU |
| North Rhine-Westphalia | List | | Jochen Borchert | CDU |
| North Rhine-Westphalia | List | | Ralf Brauksiepe | CDU |
| North Rhine-Westphalia | List | | Paul Breuer | CDU |
| North Rhine-Westphalia | List | | Cajus Julius Caesar | CDU |
| North Rhine-Westphalia | List | | Renate Diemers | CDU |
| North Rhine-Westphalia | List | | Marie-Luise Dött | CDU |
| North Rhine-Westphalia | List | | Ilse Falk | CDU |
| North Rhine-Westphalia | List | | Ingrid Fischbach | CDU |
| North Rhine-Westphalia | List | | Erich G. Fritz | CDU |
| North Rhine-Westphalia | List | | Reinhard Göhner | CDU |
| North Rhine-Westphalia | List | | Ursula Heinen-Esser | CDU |
| North Rhine-Westphalia | List | | Peter Hintze | CDU |
| North Rhine-Westphalia | List | | Hubert Hüppe | CDU |
| North Rhine-Westphalia | List | | Steffen Kampeter | CDU |
| North Rhine-Westphalia | List | | Irmgard Karwatzki | CDU |
| North Rhine-Westphalia | List | | Norbert Königshofen | CDU |
| North Rhine-Westphalia | List | | Karl Lamers | CDU |
| North Rhine-Westphalia | List | | Norbert Lammert | CDU |
| North Rhine-Westphalia | List | | Karl-Josef Laumann | CDU |
| North Rhine-Westphalia | List | | Ursula Lietz | CDU |
| North Rhine-Westphalia | List | | Wolfgang Lohmann | CDU |
| North Rhine-Westphalia | List | | Erwin Marschewski | CDU |
| North Rhine-Westphalia | List | | Wolfgang Meckelburg | CDU |
| North Rhine-Westphalia | List | | Beatrix Philipp | CDU |
| North Rhine-Westphalia | List | | Dieter Pützhofen (Note: Dieter Pützhofen resigned on 1 October 1999.) | CDU |
| North Rhine-Westphalia | List | | Thomas Rachel | CDU |
| North Rhine-Westphalia | List | | Jürgen Rüttgers (Note: Jürgen Rüttgers resigned on 5 June 2000.) | CDU |
| North Rhine-Westphalia | List | | Heinz Schemken | CDU |
| North Rhine-Westphalia | List | | Andreas Schmidt | CDU |
| North Rhine-Westphalia | List | | Hans Peter Schmitz | CDU |
| North Rhine-Westphalia | List | | Wolfgang Schulhoff | CDU |
| North Rhine-Westphalia | List | | Horst Günther (Note: Horst Günther took office on 1 October 1999, to succeed Dieter Pützhofen.) | CDU |
| North Rhine-Westphalia | List | | Bernd Wilz (Note: Bernd Wilz took office on 14 June 2000, to succeed Jürgen Rüttgers.) | CDU |
| North Rhine-Westphalia | List | | Detlef Helling (Note: Detlef Helling took office on 10 April 2002, to succeed Norbert Hauser.) | CDU |
| North Rhine-Westphalia | List | | Kurt Bodewig | SPD |
| North Rhine-Westphalia | List | | Klaus Brandner | SPD |
| North Rhine-Westphalia | List | | Anni Brandt-Elsweier | SPD |
| North Rhine-Westphalia | List | | Willi Brase | SPD |
| North Rhine-Westphalia | List | | Rainer Brinkmann | SPD |
| North Rhine-Westphalia | List | | Wolf-Michael Catenhusen | SPD |
| North Rhine-Westphalia | List | | Barbara Hendricks | SPD |
| North Rhine-Westphalia | List | | Hans-Peter Kemper | SPD |
| North Rhine-Westphalia | List | | Karin Kortmann | SPD |
| North Rhine-Westphalia | List | | Helga Kühn-Mengel | SPD |
| North Rhine-Westphalia | List | | Ingrid Matthäus-Maier (Note: Ingrid Matthäus-Maier resigned on 1 July 1999.) | SPD |
| North Rhine-Westphalia | List | | Ulrike Merten | SPD |
| North Rhine-Westphalia | List | | Franz Müntefering | SPD |
| North Rhine-Westphalia | List | | Margot von Renesse | SPD |
| North Rhine-Westphalia | List | | Dagmar Schmidt | SPD |
| North Rhine-Westphalia | List | | Walter Schöler | SPD |
| North Rhine-Westphalia | List | | Reinhard Schultz | SPD |
| North Rhine-Westphalia | List | | Angelica Schwall-Düren | SPD |
| North Rhine-Westphalia | List | | Christoph Zöpel | SPD |
| North Rhine-Westphalia | List | | Ingrid Arndt-Brauer (Note: Ingrid Arndt-Brauer took office on 1 July 1999, to succeed Ingrid Matthäus-Maier.) | SPD |
| North Rhine-Westphalia | List | | Kerstin Griese (Note: Kerstin Griese took office on 11 May 2000, to succeed Willfried Penner.) | SPD |
| North Rhine-Westphalia | List | | Ulrich Kelber (Note: Ulrich Kelber took office on 1 September 2000, to succeed Rudolf Dreßler.) | SPD |
| North Rhine-Westphalia | List | | Jörg van Essen | FDP |
| North Rhine-Westphalia | List | | Ulrike Flach | FDP |
| North Rhine-Westphalia | List | | Paul Friedhoff | FDP |
| North Rhine-Westphalia | List | | Werner Hoyer | FDP |
| North Rhine-Westphalia | List | | Gudrun Kopp | FDP |
| North Rhine-Westphalia | List | | Jürgen Möllemann (Note: Jürgen Möllemann resigned on 5 June 2000.) | FDP |
| North Rhine-Westphalia | List | | Günther Friedrich Nolting | FDP |
| North Rhine-Westphalia | List | | Detlef Parr | FDP |
| North Rhine-Westphalia | List | | Gerhard Schüßler | FDP |
| North Rhine-Westphalia | List | | Irmgard Schwaetzer | FDP |
| North Rhine-Westphalia | List | | Guido Westerwelle | FDP |
| North Rhine-Westphalia | List | | Ina Albowitz (Note: Ina Albowitz took office on 5 June 2000, to succeed Jürgen Möllemann.) | FDP |
| North Rhine-Westphalia | List | | Volker Beck | Greens |
| North Rhine-Westphalia | List | | Annelie Buntenbach | Greens |
| North Rhine-Westphalia | List | | Michaele Hustedt | Greens |
| North Rhine-Westphalia | List | | Reinhard Loske | Greens |
| North Rhine-Westphalia | List | | Kerstin Müller | Greens |
| North Rhine-Westphalia | List | | Winfried Nachtwei | Greens |
| North Rhine-Westphalia | List | | Christa Nickels | Greens |
| North Rhine-Westphalia | List | | Simone Probst | Greens |
| North Rhine-Westphalia | List | | Irmingard Schewe-Gerigk | Greens |
| North Rhine-Westphalia | List | | Christian Simmert | Greens |
| North Rhine-Westphalia | List | | Ludger Volmer | Greens |
| North Rhine-Westphalia | List | | Ulla Jelpke | PDS |
| North Rhine-Westphalia | List | | Ursula Lötzer | PDS |
| Hesse | 124 | Waldeck | Alfred Hartenbach | SPD |
| Hesse | 125 | Kassel | Gerhard Rübenkönig | SPD |
| Hesse | 126 | Werra-Meißner | Joachim Tappe | SPD |
| Hesse | 127 | Schwalm-Eder | Gerd Höfer | SPD |
| Hesse | 128 | Hersfeld | Michael Roth | SPD |
| Hesse | 129 | Marburg | Brigitte Lange | SPD |
| Hesse | 130 | Lahn-Dill | Erika Lotz | SPD |
| Hesse | 131 | Gießen | Rüdiger Veit | SPD |
| Hesse | 132 | Fulda | Martin Hohmann | CDU |
| Hesse | 133 | Hochtaunus | Bärbel Sothmann | CDU |
| Hesse | 134 | Wetterau | Nina Hauer | SPD |
| Hesse | 135 | Rheingau-Taunus – Limburg | Klaus-Peter Willsch | CDU |
| Hesse | 136 | Wiesbaden | Heidemarie Wieczorek-Zeul | SPD |
| Hesse | 137 | Hanau | Bernd Reuter | SPD |
| Hesse | 138 | Frankfurt am Main I – Main-Taunus | Heinz Riesenhuber | CDU |
| Hesse | 139 | Frankfurt am Main II | Gudrun Schaich-Walch | SPD |
| Hesse | 140 | Frankfurt am Main III | Rita Streb-Hesse | SPD |
| Hesse | 141 | Groß-Gerau | Norbert Wieczorek | SPD |
| Hesse | 142 | Offenbach | Uta Zapf | SPD |
| Hesse | 143 | Darmstadt | Walter Hoffmann | SPD |
| Hesse | 144 | Odenwald | Adelheid Tröscher | SPD |
| Hesse | 145 | Bergstraße | Christine Lambrecht | SPD |
| Hesse | List | | Friedrich Bohl | CDU |
| Hesse | List | | Wilhelm Dietzel (Note: Wilhelm Dietzel resigned on 12 April 1999.) | CDU |
| Hesse | List | | Jürgen Gehb | CDU |
| Hesse | List | | Manfred Kanther (Note: Manfred Kanther resigned on 25 January 2000.) | CDU |
| Hesse | List | | Klaus Lippold | CDU |
| Hesse | List | | Michael Meister | CDU |
| Hesse | List | | Hannelore Rönsch | CDU |
| Hesse | List | | Adolf Roth | CDU |
| Hesse | List | | Christian Schwarz-Schilling | CDU |
| Hesse | List | | Bernd Siebert | CDU |
| Hesse | List | | Erika Steinbach | CDU |
| Hesse | List | | Andreas Storm | CDU |
| Hesse | List | | Gerald Weiß | CDU |
| Hesse | List | | Wolfgang Steiger (Note: Wolfgang Steiger took office on 15 April 1999, to succeed Wilhelm Dietzel.) | CDU |
| Hesse | List | | Helmut Heiderich (Note: Helmut Heiderich took office 26 January 2000, to succeed Manfred Kanther.) | CDU |
| Hesse | List | | Matthias Berninger | Greens |
| Hesse | List | | Joschka Fischer | Greens |
| Hesse | List | | Antje Vollmer | Greens |
| Hesse | List | | Margareta Wolf | Greens |
| Hesse | List | | Wolfgang Gerhardt | FDP |
| Hesse | List | | Heinrich Kolb | FDP |
| Hesse | List | | Hans-Joachim Otto | FDP |
| Hesse | List | | Hermann Otto Solms | FDP |
| Hesse | List | | Barbara Imhof | SPD |
| Hesse | List | | Werner Schuster (Note: Werner Schuster died on 10 May 2001.) | SPD |
| Hesse | List | | Klaus Wiesehügel | SPD |
| Hesse | List | | Frank Schmidt (Note: Frank Schmidt took office on 14 May 2001, to succeed Werner Schuster.) | SPD |
| Hesse | List | | Fred Gebhardt (Note: Fred Gebhardt died on 15 August 2000.) | PDS |
| Hesse | List | | Pia Maier (Note: Pia Maier took office on 31 August 2000, to succeed Fred Gebhardt.) | PDS |
| Rhineland-Palatinate | 146 | Neuwied | Ludwig Eich | SPD |
| Rhineland-Palatinate | 147 | Ahrweiler | Wilhelm Josef Sebastian | CDU |
| Rhineland-Palatinate | 148 | Koblenz | Karl-Heinz Scherhag | CDU |
| Rhineland-Palatinate | 149 | Cochem | Peter Bleser | CDU |
| Rhineland-Palatinate | 150 | Kreuznach | Fritz Rudolf Körper | SPD |
| Rhineland-Palatinate | 151 | Bitburg | Peter Rauen | CDU |
| Rhineland-Palatinate | 152 | Trier | Karl Diller | SPD |
| Rhineland-Palatinate | 153 | Montabaur | Rudolf Scharping | SPD |
| Rhineland-Palatinate | 154 | Mainz | Eckhart Pick | SPD |
| Rhineland-Palatinate | 155 | Worms | Klaus Hagemann | SPD |
| Rhineland-Palatinate | 156 | Frankenthal | Gustav Herzog | SPD |
| Rhineland-Palatinate | 157 | Ludwigshafen | Doris Barnett | SPD |
| Rhineland-Palatinate | 158 | Neustadt – Speyer | Norbert Schindler | CDU |
| Rhineland-Palatinate | 159 | Kaiserslautern | Hansjörg Schäfer | SPD |
| Rhineland-Palatinate | 160 | Pirmasens | Lydia Westrich | SPD |
| Rhineland-Palatinate | 161 | Südpfalz | Heiner Geißler | CDU |
| Rhineland-Palatinate | List | | Maria Böhmer | CDU |
| Rhineland-Palatinate | List | | Hansjürgen Doss | CDU |
| Rhineland-Palatinate | List | | Joachim Hörster | CDU |
| Rhineland-Palatinate | List | | Helmut Kohl | CDU |
| Rhineland-Palatinate | List | | Anita Schäfer | CDU |
| Rhineland-Palatinate | List | | Susanne Tiemann | CDU |
| Rhineland-Palatinate | List | | Hans-Otto Wilhelm | CDU |
| Rhineland-Palatinate | List | | Werner Wittlich | CDU |
| Rhineland-Palatinate | List | | Elke Leonhard | SPD |
| Rhineland-Palatinate | List | | Ursula Mogg | SPD |
| Rhineland-Palatinate | List | | Andrea Nahles | SPD |
| Rhineland-Palatinate | List | | Birgit Roth | SPD |
| Rhineland-Palatinate | List | | Heinz Schmitt | SPD |
| Rhineland-Palatinate | List | | Rainer Brüderle | FDP |
| Rhineland-Palatinate | List | | Marita Sehn | FDP |
| Rhineland-Palatinate | List | | Dieter Thomae | FDP |
| Rhineland-Palatinate | List | | Ulrike Höfken | Greens |
| Rhineland-Palatinate | List | | Christian Sterzing | Greens |
| Baden-Württemberg | 162 | Stuttgart-Süd | Hans Jochen Henke | CDU |
| Baden-Württemberg | 163 | Stuttgart-Nord | Ute Kumpf | SPD |
| Baden-Württemberg | 164 | Böblingen | Brigitte Baumeister | CDU |
| Baden-Württemberg | 165 | Esslingen | Siegmar Mosdorf | SPD |
| Baden-Württemberg | 166 | Nürtingen | Elmar Müller | CDU |
| Baden-Württemberg | 167 | Göppingen | Klaus Riegert | CDU |
| Baden-Württemberg | 168 | Waiblingen | Paul Laufs | CDU |
| Baden-Württemberg | 169 | Ludwigsburg | Matthias Wissmann | CDU |
| Baden-Württemberg | 170 | Neckar-Zaber | Hans Martin Bury | SPD |
| Baden-Württemberg | 171 | Heilbronn | Thomas Strobl | CDU |
| Baden-Württemberg | 172 | Schwäbisch Hall – Hohenlohe | Wolfgang von Stetten | CDU |
| Baden-Württemberg | 173 | Backnang – Schwäbisch Gmünd | Norbert Barthle | CDU |
| Baden-Württemberg | 174 | Aalen – Heidenheim | Georg Brunnhuber | CDU |
| Baden-Württemberg | 175 | Karlsruhe-Stadt | Brigitte Wimmer | SPD |
| Baden-Württemberg | 176 | Karlsruhe-Land | Klaus Bühler | CDU |
| Baden-Württemberg | 177 | Rastatt | Peter Götz | CDU |
| Baden-Württemberg | 178 | Heidelberg | Lothar Binding | SPD |
| Baden-Württemberg | 179 | Mannheim I | Lothar Mark | SPD |
| Baden-Württemberg | 180 | Mannheim II | Konstanze Wegner | SPD |
| Baden-Württemberg | 181 | Odenwald – Tauber | Siegfried Hornung | CDU |
| Baden-Württemberg | 182 | Rhein-Neckar | Bernd Schmidbauer | CDU |
| Baden-Württemberg | 183 | Pforzheim | Ute Vogt | SPD |
| Baden-Württemberg | 184 | Calw | Hans-Joachim Fuchtel | CDU |
| Baden-Württemberg | 185 | Freiburg | Gernot Erler | SPD |
| Baden-Württemberg | 186 | Lörrach – Müllheim | Marion Caspers-Merk | SPD |
| Baden-Württemberg | 187 | Emmendingen – Lahr | Peter Weiß | CDU |
| Baden-Württemberg | 188 | Offenburg | Wolfgang Schäuble | CDU |
| Baden-Württemberg | 189 | Rottweil – Tuttlingen | Volker Kauder | CDU |
| Baden-Württemberg | 190 | Schwarzwald-Baar | Meinrad Belle | CDU |
| Baden-Württemberg | 191 | Konstanz | Hans-Peter Repnik | CDU |
| Baden-Württemberg | 192 | Waldshut | Thomas Dörflinger | CDU |
| Baden-Württemberg | 193 | Reutlingen | Anton Pfeifer | CDU |
| Baden-Württemberg | 194 | Tübingen | Herta Däubler-Gmelin | SPD |
| Baden-Württemberg | 195 | Ulm | Heinz Seiffert | CDU |
| Baden-Württemberg | 196 | Biberach | Franz Romer | CDU |
| Baden-Württemberg | 197 | Ravensburg – Bodensee | Andreas Schockenhoff | CDU |
| Baden-Württemberg | 198 | Zollernalb – Sigmaringen | Dietmar Schlee (Note: Dietmar Schlee died on 3 August 2002.) | CDU |
| Baden-Württemberg | List | | Brigitte Adler | SPD |
| Baden-Württemberg | List | | Rainer Arnold | SPD |
| Baden-Württemberg | List | | Hermann Bachmaier | SPD |
| Baden-Württemberg | List | | Rudolf Bindig | SPD |
| Baden-Württemberg | List | | Peter Dreßen | SPD |
| Baden-Württemberg | List | | Marga Elser | SPD |
| Baden-Württemberg | List | | Harald Friese | SPD |
| Baden-Württemberg | List | | Renate Gradistanac | SPD |
| Baden-Württemberg | List | | Klaus Kirschner | SPD |
| Baden-Württemberg | List | | Nicolette Kressl | SPD |
| Baden-Württemberg | List | | Christian Lange | SPD |
| Baden-Württemberg | List | | Christa Lörcher | SPD |
| Baden-Württemberg | List | | Jürgen Meyer | SPD |
| Baden-Württemberg | List | | Karin Rehbock-Zureich | SPD |
| Baden-Württemberg | List | | Hermann Scheer | SPD |
| Baden-Württemberg | List | | Jörg Tauss | SPD |
| Baden-Württemberg | List | | Matthias Weisheit | SPD |
| Baden-Württemberg | List | | Gert Weisskirchen | SPD |
| Baden-Württemberg | List | | Ernst Ulrich von Weizsäcker | SPD |
| Baden-Württemberg | List | | Uschi Eid | Greens |
| Baden-Württemberg | List | | Rita Grießhaber | Greens |
| Baden-Württemberg | List | | Winfried Hermann | Greens |
| Baden-Württemberg | List | | Monika Knoche | Greens |
| Baden-Württemberg | List | | Angelika Köster-Loßack | Greens |
| Baden-Württemberg | List | | Oswald Metzger | Greens |
| Baden-Württemberg | List | | Cem Özdemir | Greens |
| Baden-Württemberg | List | | Rezzo Schlauch | Greens |
| Baden-Württemberg | List | | Ernst Burgbacher | FDP |
| Baden-Württemberg | List | | Gisela Frick | FDP |
| Baden-Württemberg | List | | Helmut Haussmann | FDP |
| Baden-Württemberg | List | | Ulrich Heinrich | FDP |
| Baden-Württemberg | List | | Birgit Homburger | FDP |
| Baden-Württemberg | List | | Klaus Kinkel | FDP |
| Baden-Württemberg | List | | Dirk Niebel | FDP |
| Baden-Württemberg | List | | Axel Fischer | CDU |
| Baden-Württemberg | List | | Karl A. Lamers | CDU |
| Baden-Württemberg | List | | Erika Reinhardt | CDU |
| Baden-Württemberg | List | | Dorothea Störr-Ritter | CDU |
| Baden-Württemberg | List | | Annette Widmann-Mauz | CDU |
| Baden-Württemberg | List | | Heinz Wiese | CDU |
| Baden-Württemberg | List | | Egon Jüttner (Note: Egon Jüttner took office on 6 August 2002, to succeed Dietmar Schlee.) | CDU |
| Baden-Württemberg | List | | Winfried Wolf | PDS |
| Bavaria | 199 | Altötting | Josef Hollerith | CSU |
| Bavaria | 200 | Freising | Franz Obermeier | CSU |
| Bavaria | 201 | Fürstenfeldbruck | Gerda Hasselfeldt | CSU |
| Bavaria | 202 | Ingolstadt | Horst Seehofer | CSU |
| Bavaria | 203 | Munich Centre | Ulrike Mascher | SPD |
| Bavaria | 204 | Munich North | Axel Berg | SPD |
| Bavaria | 205 | Munich East | Herbert Frankenhauser | CSU |
| Bavaria | 206 | Munich South | Christoph Moosbauer | SPD |
| Bavaria | 207 | Munich West | Hans-Peter Uhl | CSU |
| Bavaria | 208 | Munich Land | Martin Mayer | CSU |
| Bavaria | 209 | Rosenheim | Wolfgang Zeitlmann | CSU |
| Bavaria | 210 | Starnberg | Ilse Aigner | CSU |
| Bavaria | 211 | Traunstein | Peter Ramsauer | CSU |
| Bavaria | 212 | Weilheim | Michaela Geiger (Note: Michaela Geiger died on 30 December 1998.) | CSU |
| Bavaria | 213 | Deggendorf | Bartholomäus Kalb | CSU |
| Bavaria | 214 | Landshut | Wolfgang Götzer | CSU |
| Bavaria | 215 | Passau | Klaus Rose | CSU |
| Bavaria | 216 | Rottal-Inn | Max Straubinger | CSU |
| Bavaria | 217 | Straubing | Ernst Hinsken | CSU |
| Bavaria | 218 | Amberg | Rudolf Kraus | CSU |
| Bavaria | 219 | Regensburg | Benno Zierer | CSU |
| Bavaria | 220 | Schwandorf | Klaus Hofbauer | CSU |
| Bavaria | 221 | Weiden | Georg Girisch | CSU |
| Bavaria | 222 | Bamberg | Gerhard Scheu | CSU |
| Bavaria | 223 | Bayreuth | Hartmut Koschyk | CSU |
| Bavaria | 224 | Coburg | Uwe Hiksch | SPD |
| Bavaria | 225 | Hof | Petra Ernstberger | SPD |
| Bavaria | 226 | Kulmbach | Bernd Protzner | CSU |
| Bavaria | 227 | Ansbach | Carl-Dieter Spranger | CSU |
| Bavaria | 228 | Erlangen | Gerhard Friedrich | CSU |
| Bavaria | 229 | Fürth | Christian Schmidt | CSU |
| Bavaria | 230 | Nuremberg North | Günter Gloser | SPD |
| Bavaria | 231 | Nuremberg South | Horst Schmidbauer | SPD |
| Bavaria | 232 | Roth | Hansgeorg Hauser | CSU |
| Bavaria | 233 | Aschaffenburg | Norbert Geis | CSU |
| Bavaria | 234 | Bad Kissingen | Eduard Lintner | CSU |
| Bavaria | 235 | Main-Spessart | Wolfgang Zöller | CSU |
| Bavaria | 236 | Schweinfurt | Michael Glos | CSU |
| Bavaria | 237 | Würzburg | Wolfgang Bötsch | CSU |
| Bavaria | 238 | Augsburg-Stadt | Christian Ruck | CSU |
| Bavaria | 239 | Augsburg-Land | Eduard Oswald | CSU |
| Bavaria | 240 | Donau-Ries | Hans Raidel | CSU |
| Bavaria | 241 | Neu-Ulm | Theo Waigel | CSU |
| Bavaria | 242 | Oberallgäu | Gerd Müller | CSU |
| Bavaria | 243 | Ostallgäu | Kurt Rossmanith | CSU |
| Bavaria | List | | Klaus Barthel | SPD |
| Bavaria | List | | Hans Büttner | SPD |
| Bavaria | List | | Gabriele Fograscher | SPD |
| Bavaria | List | | Angelika Graf | SPD |
| Bavaria | List | | Frank Hofmann | SPD |
| Bavaria | List | | Brunhilde Irber | SPD |
| Bavaria | List | | Susanne Kastner | SPD |
| Bavaria | List | | Walter Kolbow | SPD |
| Bavaria | List | | Anette Kramme | SPD |
| Bavaria | List | | Horst Kubatschka | SPD |
| Bavaria | List | | Robert Leidinger | SPD |
| Bavaria | List | | Heide Mattischeck | SPD |
| Bavaria | List | | Martin Pfaff | SPD |
| Bavaria | List | | Georg Pfannenstein | SPD |
| Bavaria | List | | Marlene Rupprecht | SPD |
| Bavaria | List | | Otto Schily | SPD |
| Bavaria | List | | Fritz Schösser | SPD |
| Bavaria | List | | Ewald Schurer | SPD |
| Bavaria | List | | Erika Simm | SPD |
| Bavaria | List | | Sigrid Skarpelis-Sperk | SPD |
| Bavaria | List | | Ludwig Stiegler | SPD |
| Bavaria | List | | Jella Teuchner | SPD |
| Bavaria | List | | Uta Titze-Stecher | SPD |
| Bavaria | List | | Günter Verheugen (Note: Günter Verheugen resigned on 16 September 1999.) | SPD |
| Bavaria | List | | Verena Wohlleben | SPD |
| Bavaria | List | | Hanna Wolf | SPD |
| Bavaria | List | | Heidemarie Wright | SPD |
| Bavaria | List | | Reinhold Strobl (Note: Reinhold Strobl took office on 17 September 1999, to succeed Günter Verheugen.) | SPD |
| Bavaria | List | | Renate Blank | CSU |
| Bavaria | List | | Albert Dess | CSU |
| Bavaria | List | | Maria Eichhorn | CSU |
| Bavaria | List | | Hans-Peter Friedrich | CSU |
| Bavaria | List | | Klaus Holetschek (Note: Klaus Holetschek resigned on 6 May 2002.) | CSU |
| Bavaria | List | | Hans Michelbach | CSU |
| Bavaria | List | | Johannes Singhammer | CSU |
| Bavaria | List | | Dagmar Wöhrl | CSU |
| Bavaria | List | | Aribert Wolf | CSU |
| Bavaria | List | | Matthäus Strebl (Note: Matthäus Strebl took office on 12 January 1999, to succeed Michaela Geiger.) | CSU |
| Bavaria | List | | Marion Seib (Note: Marion Seib took office on 7 May 2002, to succeed Klaus Holetschek.) | CSU |
| Bavaria | List | | Ekin Deligöz | Greens |
| Bavaria | List | | Hans-Josef Fell | Greens |
| Bavaria | List | | Claudia Roth (Note: Claudia Roth resigned on 31 March 2001.) | Greens |
| Bavaria | List | | Christine Scheel | Greens |
| Bavaria | List | | Albert Schmidt | Greens |
| Bavaria | List | | Helmut Wilhelm | Greens |
| Bavaria | List | | Gerald Häfner (Note: Gerald Häfner took office on 1 April 2001, to succeed Claudia Roth.) | Greens |
| Bavaria | List | | Hildebrecht Braun | FDP |
| Bavaria | List | | Horst Friedrich | FDP |
| Bavaria | List | | Ulrich Irmer | FDP |
| Bavaria | List | | Sabine Leutheusser-Schnarrenberger | FDP |
| Bavaria | List | | Max Stadler | FDP |
| Bavaria | List | | Eva Bulling-Schröter | PDS |
| Saarland | 244 | Saarbrücken I | Oskar Lafontaine (Note: Oskar Lafontaine resigned on 16 March 1999.) | SPD |
| Saarland | 245 | Saarbrücken II | Jutta Müller | SPD |
| Saarland | 246 | Saarlouis | Ottmar Schreiner | SPD |
| Saarland | 247 | St. Wendel | Hans-Georg Wagner | SPD |
| Saarland | 248 | Homburg | Lothar Fischer | SPD |
| Saarland | List | | Peter Altmaier | CDU |
| Saarland | List | | Peter Jacoby (Note: Peter Jacoby resigned on 19 October 1999.) | CDU |
| Saarland | List | | Helmut Rauber | CDU |
| Saarland | List | | Albrecht Feibel (Note: Albrecht Feibel took office on 29 October 1999, to succeed Peter Jacoby.) | CDU |
| Saarland | List | | Gudrun Roos (Note: Gudrun Roos took office on 29 March 1999, to succeed Oskar Lafontaine.) | SPD |
| Berlin | 249 | Berlin-Mitte – Prenzlauer Berg | Petra Pau | PDS |
| Berlin | 250 | Berlin-Tiergarten – Wedding – Nord-Charlottenburg | Jörg-Otto Spiller | SPD |
| Berlin | 251 | Berlin-Reinickendorf | Detlef Dzembritzki | SPD |
| Berlin | 252 | Berlin-Spandau | Wolfgang Behrendt | SPD |
| Berlin | 253 | Berlin-Zehlendorf – Steglitz | Renate Rennebach | SPD |
| Berlin | 254 | Berlin-Charlottenburg – Wilmersdorf | Siegrun Klemmer | SPD |
| Berlin | 255 | Berlin-Kreuzberg – Schöneberg | Eckhardt Barthel | SPD |
| Berlin | 256 | Berlin-Tempelhof | Ingrid Holzhüter | SPD |
| Berlin | 257 | Berlin-Neukölln | Ditmar Staffelt | SPD |
| Berlin | 258 | Berlin-Friedrichshain – Lichtenberg | Christa Luft | PDS |
| Berlin | 259 | Berlin-Köpenick – Treptow | Siegfried Scheffler | SPD |
| Berlin | 260 | Berlin-Hellersdorf – Marzahn | Gregor Gysi (Note: Gregor Gysi resigned on 1 February 2002.) | PDS |
| Berlin | 261 | Berlin-Hohenschönhausen – Pankow – Weißensee | Manfred Müller | PDS |
| Berlin | List | | Sabine Bergmann-Pohl | CDU |
| Berlin | List | | Dankward Buwitt | CDU |
| Berlin | List | | Siegfried Helias | CDU |
| Berlin | List | | Günter Nooke | CDU |
| Berlin | List | | Rupert Scholz | CDU |
| Berlin | List | | Diethard Schütze | CDU |
| Berlin | List | | Edeltraut Töpfer | CDU |
| Berlin | List | | Franziska Eichstädt-Bohlig | Greens |
| Berlin | List | | Andrea Fischer | Greens |
| Berlin | List | | Hans-Christian Ströbele | Greens |
| Berlin | List | | Wolfgang Thierse | SPD |
| Berlin | List | | Günter Rexrodt | FDP |
| Berlin | List | | Bärbel Grygier (Note: Bärbel Grygier took office on 8 February 2002, to succeed Gregor Gysi.) | PDS |
| Mecklenburg-Vorpommern | 262 | Wismar – Gadebusch – Grevesmühlen – Doberan – Bützow | Iris Hoffmann | SPD |
| Mecklenburg-Vorpommern | 263 | Schwerin – Hagenow | Hans-Joachim Hacker | SPD |
| Mecklenburg-Vorpommern | 264 | Güstrow – Sternberg – Lübz – Parchim – Ludwigslust | Christel Deichmann | SPD |
| Mecklenburg-Vorpommern | 265 | Rostock | Christine Lucyga | SPD |
| Mecklenburg-Vorpommern | 266 | Rostock-Land – Ribnitz-Damgarten – Teterow – Malchin | Dirk Manzewski | SPD |
| Mecklenburg-Vorpommern | 267 | Stralsund – Rügen – Grimmen | Angela Merkel | CDU |
| Mecklenburg-Vorpommern | 268 | Greifswald – Wolgast – Demmin | Ulrich Adam | CDU |
| Mecklenburg-Vorpommern | 269 | Neubrandenburg – Altentreptow – Waren – Röbel | Götz-Peter Lohmann | SPD |
| Mecklenburg-Vorpommern | 270 | Neustrelitz – Strasburg – Pasewalk – Ueckermünde – Anklam | Frank Hempel | SPD |
| Mecklenburg-Vorpommern | List | | Dietmar Bartsch | PDS |
| Mecklenburg-Vorpommern | List | | Heinrich Fink | PDS |
| Mecklenburg-Vorpommern | List | | Sabine Jünger | PDS |
| Mecklenburg-Vorpommern | List | | Angela Marquardt | PDS |
| Mecklenburg-Vorpommern | List | | Susanne Jaffke | CDU |
| Mecklenburg-Vorpommern | List | | Paul Krüger (Note: Paul Krüger resigned on 14 August 2001.) | CDU |
| Mecklenburg-Vorpommern | List | | Werner Kuhn (Note: Werner Kuhn took office on 15 August 2001, to succeed Paul Krüger.) | CDU |
| Brandenburg | 271 | Neuruppin – Kyritz – Wittstock – Pritzwalk – Perleberg | Ernst Bahr | SPD |
| Brandenburg | 272 | Prenzlau – Angermünde – Schwedt – Templin – Gransee | Markus Meckel | SPD |
| Brandenburg | 273 | Oranienburg – Nauen | Angelika Krüger-Leißner | SPD |
| Brandenburg | 274 | Eberswalde – Bernau – Bad Freienwalde | Petra Bierwirth | SPD |
| Brandenburg | 275 | Brandenburg a.d. Havel – Rathenow – Belzig | Margrit Spielmann | SPD |
| Brandenburg | 276 | Potsdam | Emil Schnell | SPD |
| Brandenburg | 277 | Fürstenwalde – Strausberg – Seelow | Mathias Schubert | SPD |
| Brandenburg | 278 | Luckenwalde – Zossen – Jüterbog – Königs Wusterhausen | Peter Danckert | SPD |
| Brandenburg | 279 | Frankfurt (Oder) – Eisenhüttenstadt – Beeskow | Winfried Mante | SPD |
| Brandenburg | 280 | Cottbus – Guben – Forst | Werner Labsch | SPD |
| Brandenburg | 281 | Senftenberg – Calau – Spremberg | Albrecht Papenroth | SPD |
| Brandenburg | 282 | Bad Liebenwerda – Finsterwalde – Herzberg – Lübben – Luckau | Stephan Hilsberg | SPD |
| Brandenburg | List | | Rainer Eppelmann | CDU |
| Brandenburg | List | | Ulf Fink | CDU |
| Brandenburg | List | | Katherina Reiche | CDU |
| Brandenburg | List | | Michael Stübgen | CDU |
| Brandenburg | List | | Andrea Voßhoff | CDU |
| Brandenburg | List | | Monika Balt | PDS |
| Brandenburg | List | | Maritta Böttcher | PDS |
| Brandenburg | List | | Wolfgang Gehrcke | PDS |
| Brandenburg | List | | Rolf Kutzmutz | PDS |
| Brandenburg | List | | Sylvia Voß | Greens |
| Brandenburg | List | | Jürgen Türk | FDP |
| Saxony-Anhalt | 283 | Altmark | Reinhard Weis | SPD |
| Saxony-Anhalt | 284 | Elbe-Havel-Gebiet und Haldensleben – Wolmirstedt | Waltraud Wolff | SPD |
| Saxony-Anhalt | 285 | Harz und Vorharzgebiet | Tobias Marhold | SPD |
| Saxony-Anhalt | 286 | Magdeburg | Uwe Küster | SPD |
| Saxony-Anhalt | 287 | Magdeburg – Schönebeck – Wanzleben – Staßfurt | Ulrich Kasparick | SPD |
| Saxony-Anhalt | 288 | Wittenberg – Gräfenhainichen – Jessen – Roßlau – Zerbst | Engelbert Wistuba | SPD |
| Saxony-Anhalt | 289 | Dessau – Bitterfeld | Ilse Schumann (Note: Ilse Schumann died on 9 August 2000.) | SPD |
| Saxony-Anhalt | 290 | Bernburg – Aschersleben – Quedlinburg | Eberhard Brecht (Note: Eberhard Brecht resigned on 30 June 2001.) | SPD |
| Saxony-Anhalt | 291 | Halle-Altstadt | Christel Hanewinckel | SPD |
| Saxony-Anhalt | 292 | Halle-Neustadt – Saalkreis – Köthen | Manfred Hampel | SPD |
| Saxony-Anhalt | 293 | Merseburg – Querfurt – Weißenfels | Sabine Kaspereit | SPD |
| Saxony-Anhalt | 294 | Zeitz – Hohenmölsen – Naumburg – Nebra | Eckhart Lewering | SPD |
| Saxony-Anhalt | 295 | Eisleben – Hettstedt – Sangerhausen | Silvia Schmidt | SPD |
| Saxony-Anhalt | List | | Monika Brudlewsky | CDU |
| Saxony-Anhalt | List | | Hartmut Büttner | CDU |
| Saxony-Anhalt | List | | Peter Letzgus | CDU |
| Saxony-Anhalt | List | | Manfred Lischewski | CDU |
| Saxony-Anhalt | List | | Clemens Schwalbe | CDU |
| Saxony-Anhalt | List | | Margarete Späte | CDU |
| Saxony-Anhalt | List | | Petra Bläss | PDS |
| Saxony-Anhalt | List | | Roland Claus | PDS |
| Saxony-Anhalt | List | | Heidemarie Ehlert | PDS |
| Saxony-Anhalt | List | | Heidi Knake-Werner (Note: Heidi Knake-Werner resigned on 17 February 2002.) | PDS |
| Saxony-Anhalt | List | | Uwe-Jens Rössel | PDS |
| Saxony-Anhalt | List | | Wolfgang Bierstedt (Note: Wolfgang Bierstedt took office on 18 February 2002, to succeed Heidi Knake-Werner.) | PDS |
| Saxony-Anhalt | List | | Cornelia Pieper (Note: Cornelia Pieper resigned on 31 May 2002.) | FDP |
| Saxony-Anhalt | List | | Gudrun Serowiecki (Note: Gudrun Serowiecki took office on 3 June 2002, to succeed Cornelia Pieper.) | FDP |
| Saxony-Anhalt | List | | Steffi Lemke | Greens |
| Thuringia | 296 | Nordhausen – Worbis – Heiligenstadt | Manfred Grund | CDU |
| Thuringia | 297 | Eisenach – Mühlhausen | Eckhard Ohl | SPD |
| Thuringia | 298 | Sömmerda – Artern – Sondershausen – Langensalza | Gisela Hilbrecht | SPD |
| Thuringia | 299 | Gotha – Arnstadt | Gerhard Neumann | SPD |
| Thuringia | 300 | Erfurt | Carsten Schneider | SPD |
| Thuringia | 301 | Weimar – Apolda – Erfurt-Land | Edelbert Richter | SPD |
| Thuringia | 302 | Jena – Rudolstadt – Stadtroda | Christoph Matschie | SPD |
| Thuringia | 303 | Gera-Stadt – Eisenberg – Gera-Land I | Karsten Schönfeld | SPD |
| Thuringia | 304 | Altenburg – Schmölln – Greiz – Gera-Land II | Peter Friedrich (Note: Peter Friedrich resigned on 13 September 2002.) | SPD |
| Thuringia | 305 | Saalfeld – Pößneck – Schleiz – Lobenstein – Zeulenroda | Christine Lehder | SPD |
| Thuringia | 306 | Meiningen – Bad Salzungen – Hildburghausen – Sonneberg | Wieland Sorge | SPD |
| Thuringia | 307 | Suhl – Schmalkalden – Ilmenau – Neuhaus | Iris Gleicke | SPD |
| Thuringia | List | | Manfred Heise | CDU |
| Thuringia | List | | Harald Kahl | CDU |
| Thuringia | List | | Vera Lengsfeld | CDU |
| Thuringia | List | | Bernward Müller | CDU |
| Thuringia | List | | Claudia Nolte | CDU |
| Thuringia | List | | Norbert Otto | CDU |
| Thuringia | List | | Ruth Fuchs | PDS |
| Thuringia | List | | Carsten Hübner | PDS |
| Thuringia | List | | Gerhard Jüttemann | PDS |
| Thuringia | List | | Kerstin Naumann | PDS |
| Thuringia | List | | Rosel Neuhäuser | PDS |
| Thuringia | List | | Katrin Göring-Eckardt | Greens |
| Thuringia | List | | Karlheinz Guttmacher | FDP |
| Saxony | 308 | Delitzsch – Eilenburg – Torgau – Wurzen | Richard Schuhmann | SPD |
| Saxony | 309 | Leipzig I | Rainer Fornahl | SPD |
| Saxony | 310 | Leipzig II | Gunter Weißgerber | SPD |
| Saxony | 311 | Leipzig-Land – Borna – Geithain | Jürgen Wieczorek | SPD |
| Saxony | 312 | Döbeln – Grimma – Oschatz | Manfred Kolbe (Note: Manfred Kolbe resigned on 2 October 2000.) | CDU |
| Saxony | 313 | Meißen – Riesa – Großenhain | Hans-Dirk Bierling | CDU |
| Saxony | 314 | Hoyerswerda – Kamenz – Weißwasser | Ulrich Klinkert | CDU |
| Saxony | 315 | Görlitz – Zittau – Niesky | Georg Janovsky | CDU |
| Saxony | 316 | Bautzen – Löbau | Gottfried Haschke | CDU |
| Saxony | 317 | Pirna – Sebnitz – Bischofswerda | Klaus Brähmig | CDU |
| Saxony | 318 | Dresden I | Christa Reichard | CDU |
| Saxony | 319 | Dresden II | Arnold Vaatz | CDU |
| Saxony | 320 | Dresden-Land – Freital – Dippoldiswalde | Rainer Jork | CDU |
| Saxony | 321 | Freiberg – Brand-Erbisdorf – Flöha – Marienberg | Joachim Schmidt | CDU |
| Saxony | 322 | Glauchau – Rochlitz – Hohenstein-Ernstthal – Hainichen | Simone Violka | SPD |
| Saxony | 323 | Chemnitz I | Jelena Hoffmann | SPD |
| Saxony | 324 | Chemnitz II – Chemnitz-Land | Gerald Thalheim | SPD |
| Saxony | 325 | Annaberg – Stollberg – Zschopau | Günter Baumann | CDU |
| Saxony | 326 | Aue – Schwarzenberg – Klingenthal | Wolfgang Dehnel | CDU |
| Saxony | 327 | Zwickau – Werdau | Michael Luther | CDU |
| Saxony | 328 | Reichenbach – Plauen – Auerbach – Oelsnitz | Rolf Schwanitz | SPD |
| Saxony | List | | Klaus Grehn | PDS |
| Saxony | List | | Barbara Höll | PDS |
| Saxony | List | | Evelyn Kenzler | PDS |
| Saxony | List | | Heidemarie Lüth | PDS |
| Saxony | List | | Christine Ostrowski | PDS |
| Saxony | List | | Christina Schenk | PDS |
| Saxony | List | | Täve Schur | PDS |
| Saxony | List | | Ilja Seifert | PDS |
| Saxony | List | | Iris Follak | SPD |
| Saxony | List | | Renate Jäger | SPD |
| Saxony | List | | Christian Müller | SPD |
| Saxony | List | | Barbara Wittig | SPD |
| Saxony | List | | Antje Hermenau | Greens |
| Saxony | List | | Werner Schulz | Greens |
| Saxony | List | | Joachim Günther | FDP |
| Saxony | List | | Klaus Haupt | FDP |
| Saxony | List | | Gerhard Schulz (Note: Gerhard Schulz took office on 5 October 2000, to succeed Manfred Kolbe.) | CDU |

== See also ==
- Politics of Germany
- List of Bundestag Members
