= Werner Schuster =

Werner Schuster may refer to:

- Werner Schuster (politician) (1939–2001), German physician and politician
- Werner Schuster (sportsman) (born 1969), Austrian ski jumping coach
