= Rainer Brinkmann =

Rainer Brinkmann may refer to:

- Rainer Brinkmann (admiral) (born 1958), German Navy admiral and Deputy Inspector of the Navy
- Rainer Brinkmann (politician) (born 1958), German politician of the Social Democratic Party
