= Klaus Francke =

German politician (1936–2020)

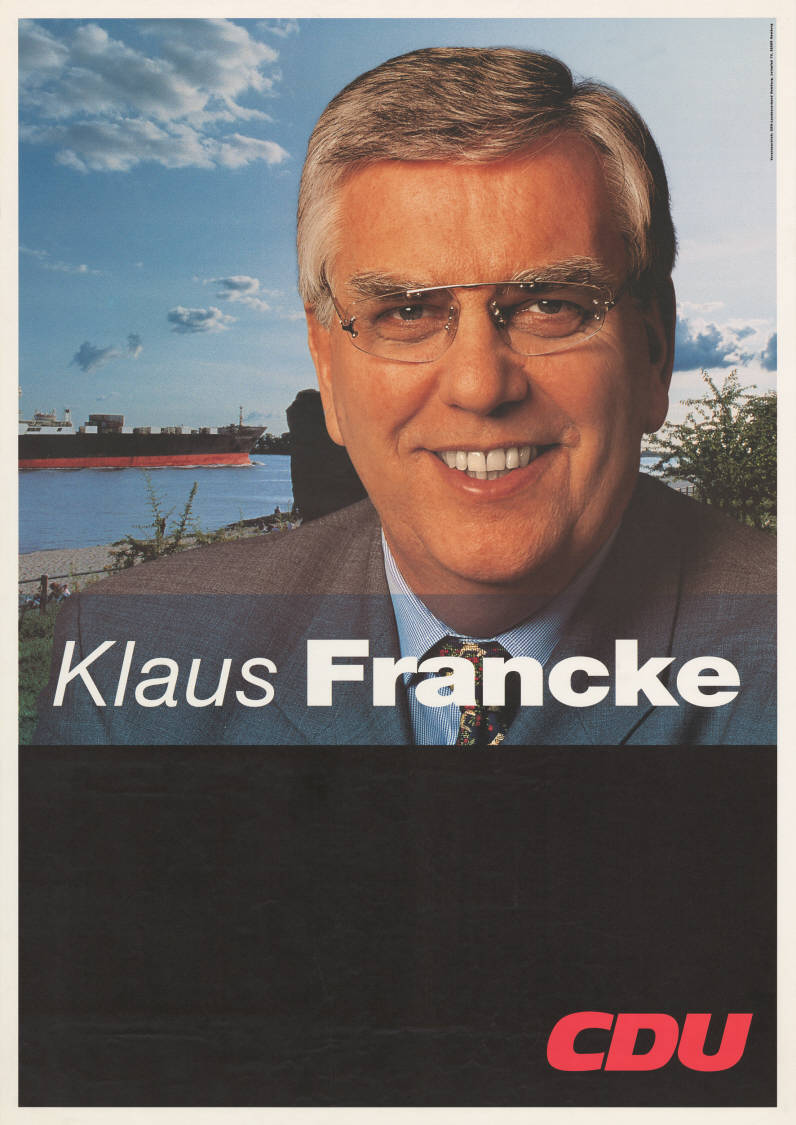
- Klaus Francke's candidate poster for the 1998 federal election

Member of the Bundestag
- In office 1976 – 1998, 2001-2002

Personal details
- Born: 17 July 1936 Hamburg, Germany
- Died: 28 June 2020 (aged 83) Hamburg, Germany
- Party: CDU

Klaus Francke (17 July 1936 – 28 June 2020) was a German politician of the Christian Democratic Union (CDU) and former member of the German Bundestag.

== Life ==
Francke joined the Junge Union and the CDU in 1956, and from 1964 to 1989 he was district chairman of the Hamburg-Wandsbek CDU district association and a member of the state executive board. From 1966 to 1978 he was a member of the Hamburg parliament. He was a member of the German Bundestag from 1976 to 1998, and on 7 November 2001 he again succeeded Gunnar Uldall in Parliament until 2002.
