= Axel Gedaschko =

German politician

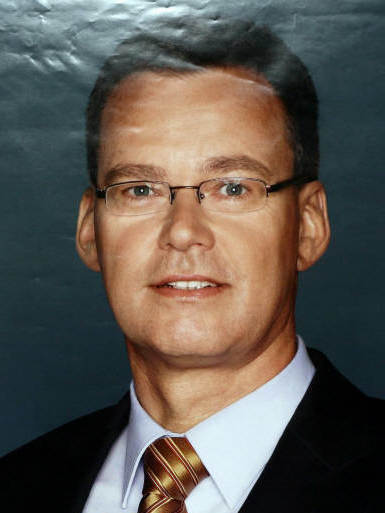
- Axel Gedaschko

Senator of Economic Affairs and Employment
- Incumbent
- Assumed office 2008
- Preceded by: Gunnar Uldall

Personal details
- Born: 1959 (age 66–67) Hamburg
- Party: CDU

Axel Gedaschko (born 1959) is a former German politician, representative of the German Christian Democratic Union.

Gedaschko was born 1959 in Hamburg and is father of two children. He studied law at the University of Hamburg and Göttingen.

From 2008 until 2010 Gedaschko was state minister of Economic Affairs and Employment in Hamburg. Since 2011, he has been the President of GdW – the Federal Association of German Housing and Real Estate Companies – representing around 3,000 housing enterprises and cooperatives across Germany.
