= Gabriele Fograscher =

German politician (born 1957)

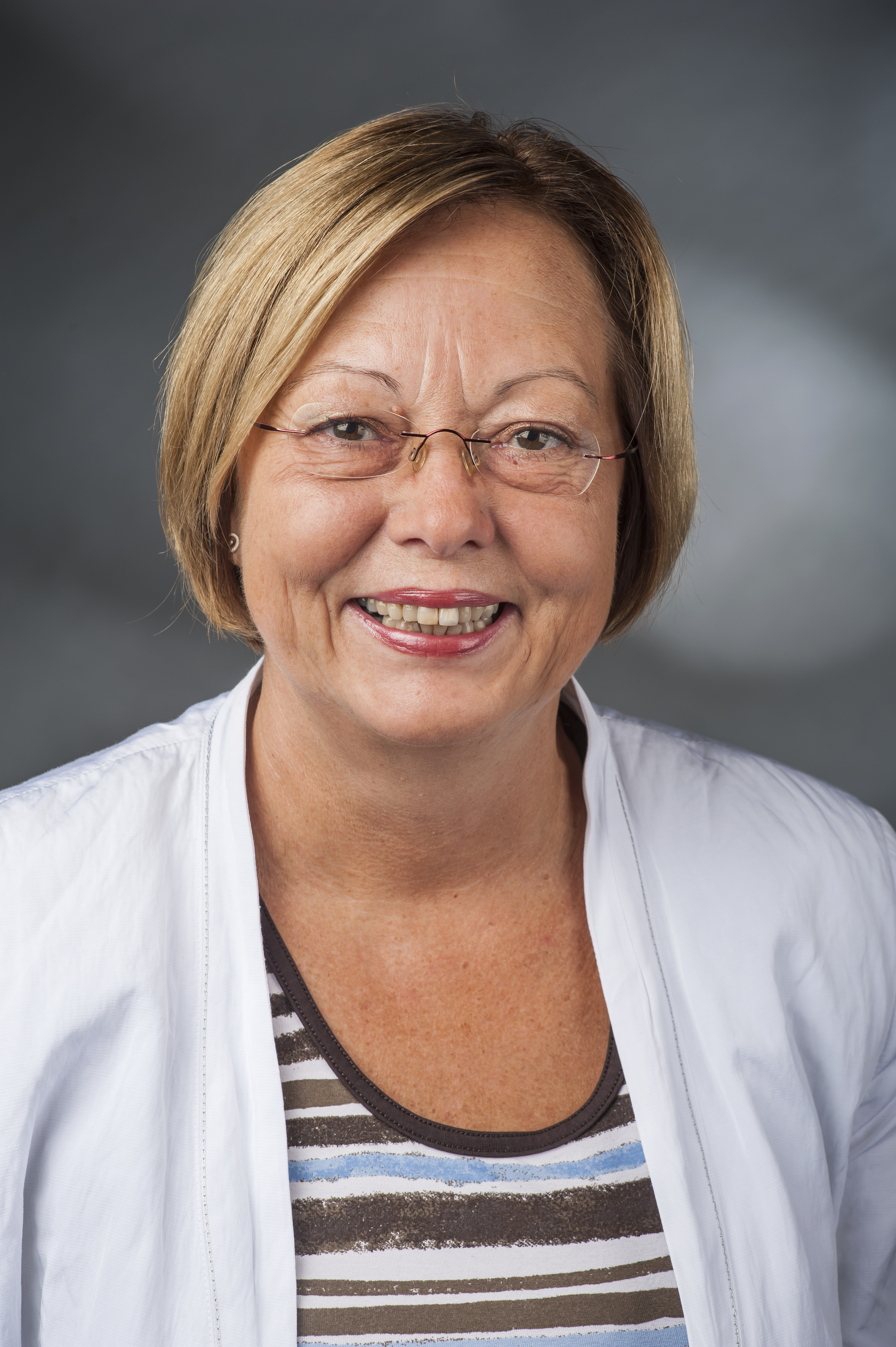

Member of the Bundestag for Bavaria
- In office 1994–2017

Personal details
- Born: 6 May 1957 (age 69) Nördlingen, Bavaria
- Party: Social Democratic Party of Germany (SPD)
- Children: 2

Gabriele Fograscher (born 6 May 1957 in Nördlingen) is a German politician and member of the Social Democratic Party of Germany (SPD).

== Early life and education ==
After completing her secondary education in 1974, Gabriele Fograscher trained as a home economics teacher, which she completed in 1978 with the state examination. In 1979, she passed the first teacher's examination at the State Institute for the Training of Specialist Teachers and, after completing a traineeship, also passed the second teacher's examination for the subjects of needlework and home economics in 1981. Since 1987, she has worked as an educator in the children's home Nördlingen of the Rummelsberger Anstalten.

Gabriele Fograscher is married and has two children.

== Political career ==
She was first elected to the German Bundestag in 1994. She was a full member of the Committee on Economic Cooperation and Development in the 13th Bundestag. From the 14th Bundestag was a full member of the Interior Committee. From November 2005, she was deputy spokeswoman for the SPD parliamentary group's working group on the interior, and from February 2006, spokeswoman for the working group on right-wing extremism. From October 2007, she is also a member of the executive committee of the SPD parliamentary group. In January 2014, her parliamentary group successfully proposed her for the Parliamentary Oversight Panel. She was also a member of the panel under Article 13(6) of the Basic Law and the panel under Section 23c(8) of the Customs Investigation Service Act and a deputy member of the Elections Committee.

Gabriele Fograscher always entered the Bundestag via the Bavarian state list. Her constituency was Donau-Ries. She declared that she would not run again in the 2017 Bundestag election.

She is a member of the advisory board of the Alliance for Democracy and Tolerance (German: Bündnis für Demokratie und Toleranz).
