= Heidi Knake-Werner =

German politician

Heidi Knake-Werner is a German politician (Die Linke). She served as a member of the German parliament ("Bundestag") between 1994 and 2002. Between 2002 and 2009 she was one of Berlin's more high-profile senators.

== Life ==
=== Provenance and early years ===
Heidi Knake was born in Tomaschow (as it was known at that time), a midsized industrial town to the south-west of Warsaw which had been in Congress Poland before the First World War, in Poland subsequently, and since 1939 part of Nazi Germany. However, by the time she was 2 extensive ethnic cleansing in what had again become Poland in 1945 had already removed most of the German-speaking population, and she grew up in Wilhelmshaven on Germany's north-western coast. Knake passed her Abitur (school final exams) in 1964 which opened the way to university-level education. She then progressed to the University of Göttingen, emerging in 1969 with a degree in Social Economics. There followed a period of post-graduate research and study at Oldenburg. It was from the university at Oldenburg that in 1978 she received her doctorate in Social Sciences, and where till 1987 she stayed on as a researcher into topics such as family, education and industrial sociology. That year she switched to the University of Bremen.

=== Communist ===
Heike Knake became a DGB (trades union) member in 1969, and has been a member of a succession of unions subsequently. She joined the Social Democratic Party ("Sozialdemokratische Partei Deutschlands" / SPD) in 1970, and became increasingly engaged politically, both within the party and in local politics more generally, serving for four years as a municipal councillor in Oldenburg. For some of this time she was the deputy leader of the SPD group on the council. However, at the height of the ructions over professional blocks for members of extremist political parties, in 1981 she resigned from the SPD and joined the German Communist Party. This came directly after the increasingly "moderate" SPD party executive had launched its own "party operation" ("Parteiordnungsverfahren") against the "renitente Linke" (loosely "reluctant left"). She remained a Communist Party member till 1989.

In 2009 Heidi Knake-Werner was asked about her decision to join the West German Communist Party:

- "I joined the Communist Party in the early 1980s not because of the German Democratic Republic but despite of it. For a West German leftist like me there were plenty of reasons to work for socialistic alternatives. I had been a member of the SPD and had seen how the party had helped to push the NATO Double-Track Decision, how it helped to push the Berufsverbote, how it had further and further abandoned Willy Brandt's vision of a democratic socialism."
- "…ich bin Anfang der 80er Jahre nicht wegen der DDR in die DKP eingetreten, sondern trotz der DDR. Für eine Westlinke wie mich gab es in jenen Jahren genügend Gründe, sich für gesellschaftliche Alternativen einzusetzen. Ich kam ja aus der SPD und hatte dort erlebt, wie die SPD den Nato-Doppelbeschluss mit vorangetrieben hat, wie sie Berufsverbote vorangetrieben hat, wie sie sich immer weiter von Willy Brandts Vorstellungen eines demokratischen Sozialismus verabschiedet hat."
Heidi Knake-Werner interviewed by Lars von Törne in 2009

The German Communist Party never gained electoral traction with West German voters, partly because of a widespread belief that across the "inner border" in East Germany the supposedly pro-communist ruling party was principally a tool of Soviet imperial expansionist ambitions. Sources are almost entirely silent about Heidi Knake-Werner's nine years as a member of the German Communist Party. In 1990 she changed her political allegiance again, joining the Party of Democratic Socialism (PDS), recently relaunched as a successor to the old East German Socialist Unity Party, as younger members of what had till recently been East Germany's ruling political establishment struggled to prepare for a democratic future, following the changes of 1989/90. Reunification took place suddenly, formally, in October 1990, and during the rest of that year it was still unusual for a western politician to join the PDS: most of the relatively small number who did so came not from the West German Communist Party but from the SPD. Her own transition gave Knake-Werner a reputation as a political maverick which she has subsequently seemed to relish.

=== Party of Democratic Socialism ===
At the second party conference of the PDS, held in Berlin on 26/27 January 1991, she was elected a member of the party executive, and was also one of just four PDS members from former West Germany to be voted onto the party presidium. Later that year she accepted an offer from the youthful PDS Bundestag member, Petra Bläss to work as a parliamentary researcher for the PDS group in the Bundestag. For Heidi Knake-Werner it was the start of a Bundestag career that would last for more than a decade. In 1994 Knake-Werner herself was elected to the Bundestag. She stood as a list-candidate from the "Aschersleben–Bernburg–Quedlinburg" electoral district where the party failed to clear the 5% hurdle necessary to send members to the Bundestag. However, in the recently re-established state of Saxony-Anhalt, the PDS received 18% of the total vote and was thereby entitled to nominate 4 additional members: Heidi Knake-Werner was one of those nominated.

=== Bundestag ===
During the 1994-1998 parliamentary session Knake-Werner was a deputy chairperson of the PDS parliamentary group, under the leadership of Gregor Gysi. In the Bundestag she took on responsibility for her party's "Labour market and social policy" portfolio. She also represented the PDS position to the parliamentary committee for "Labour and Social Affairs" and on the parliamentary "Health committee". That reflected several of the areas on which she had already focused while working before 1994 as a parliamentary researcher for Petra Bläss. Other themes in which she took a particular interest included pensions policy, family matters and gender equality, both in the workplace and more widely. She also engaged with more overtly feminist agenda issues such as the ongoing debates about abortion legislation, an issue on respect of which the country had inherited more conventionally "liberal" laws from communist East Germany than from capitalist West Germany. The carefully detailed nature of her numerous annotation included in party archives make it clear that she contributed extensively to the content and coherence of the party's position papers on many of these topics. During the 1994-1998 Bundestag session Heidi Knake-Werner was the author or co-author of 3 draft laws, 18 parliamentary motions, 3 motions for resolution, and 30 amendments as well as of 4 major question applications and 67 minor question applications. She delivered 56 speeches in plenary parliamentary sessions and issued 135 press statements. She was also a member of the PDS parliamentary delegation that took part in the Fourth International United Nations Women's Forum held in Beijing during the first part of September 1995.

In the 1998 General election Knake-Werner was re-elected. The PDS increased its share of the national vote from 4.4% to 5.1%. Breaking through to 5% hurdle significantly increased the party's strength in the Bundestag, notably in respect of appointments to parliamentary committees. In addition, for the first time the PDS was able to nominate a member to the Bundestag presidium. During the parliamentary session, till 2002, Knake-Werner served as a member of the executive of the PDS parliamentary group, and till October 2000 she was also deputy leader of the PDS Bundstag group. Then, as part of a general shake-up at the top of the parliamentary party that accompanied the unexpected resignation from the leadership of Gregor Gysi, in October 2000 she was, some felt, demoted when she became the parliamentary group's "First Parliamentary Business Leader" ("Erste Parlamentarische Geschäftsführerin"), remaining in post till January 2002. The PDS group were now able to send her as a full member to the Bundestag committee for "Labour and Social Affairs", of which till October 2000 she served as a deputy chairwoman. In respect of the deputy chairmanship role she was replaced when she became "First Parliamentary Business Leader" of the PDS, but she continued to play her part as the PDS member of the committee.

Separately, by 2002 she was serving as honorary chairwomen of the German-Portuguese parliamentary group. On 17 February 2002 Heidi Knake-Werner resigned from the Bundestag in order to take up new duties as a Berlin senator. Her successor in the Bundestag was Wolfgang Bierstedt.

=== Berlin senate ===
Between 17 January 2002 and November 2006 Heid Knake-Werner served as the Berlin senator for Health, Social affairs and Consumer protection. She switched portfolios on 23 November 2006, becoming the senator for Integration, Labour and Social affairs. In the Berlin election of September 2006 she was elected a member of the City Parliament ("Abgeordnetenhaus"), but half a year later she withdrew from the chamber in order to be able to focus on her ministerial duties. Then, on 15 October 2009, she resigned her office on grounds of age.

=== Later years ===
In October 2010 she was elected to chair the Berlin region Volkssolidarität ("People's Solidarity"), a welfare organisation for the over 65s which traces its origins back to East Berlin and the old German Democratic Republic, but which survived the traumas of reunification better than most of the state mandated East German institutions. In 2014 a further election confirmed her in office. By that time it was reported that the Berlin Volkssolidarität was operating around 70 day centers, retirement homes and other facilities in Berlin.
