= Eberhard Brecht =

German politician

Eberhard Brecht MdB
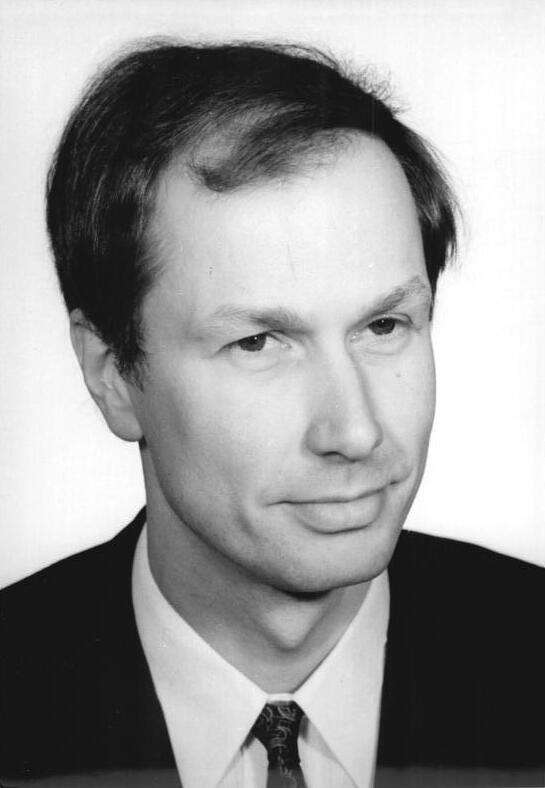
- Eberhard Brecht in 1990

Lord Mayor of Quedlinburg
- In office 30 June 2001 – 30 June 2015
- Preceded by: Wolfgang Scheller (acting)
- Succeeded by: Frank Ruch

Member of the Bundestag for Saxony-Anhalt
- Incumbent
- Assumed office 25 October 2019
- Preceded by: Burkhard Lischka
- Constituency: SPD List
- In office 20 December 1990 – 30 June 2001
- Preceded by: Constituency established
- Succeeded by: Constituency abolished
- Constituency: SPD List (1990–1998); Bernburg – Aschersleben – Quedlinburg (1998–2001)

Member of the Volkskammer for Halle
- In office 5 April 1990 – 2 October 1990
- Preceded by: Constituency established
- Succeeded by: Constituency abolished

Personal details
- Born: 20 February 1950 (age 76) Quedlinburg, East Germany (now Germany)
- Party: SPD
- Children: 3

Eberhard Brecht (born 20 February 1950) is a German politician. Born in Quedlinburg, Saxony-Anhalt, he represents the SPD. Eberhard Brecht has served as a member of the Bundestag from the state of Saxony-Anhalt from 1990 till 2001 and since 2019.

== Life ==
He was a member of the Volkskammer 1990 and the Bundestag from 1990 to 2001 and since October 2019. From 2001 to 2015 he was Lord Mayor of Quedlinburg. He is a member of the Defence Committee.
