= Paul Krüger (politician) =

German politician (born 1950)

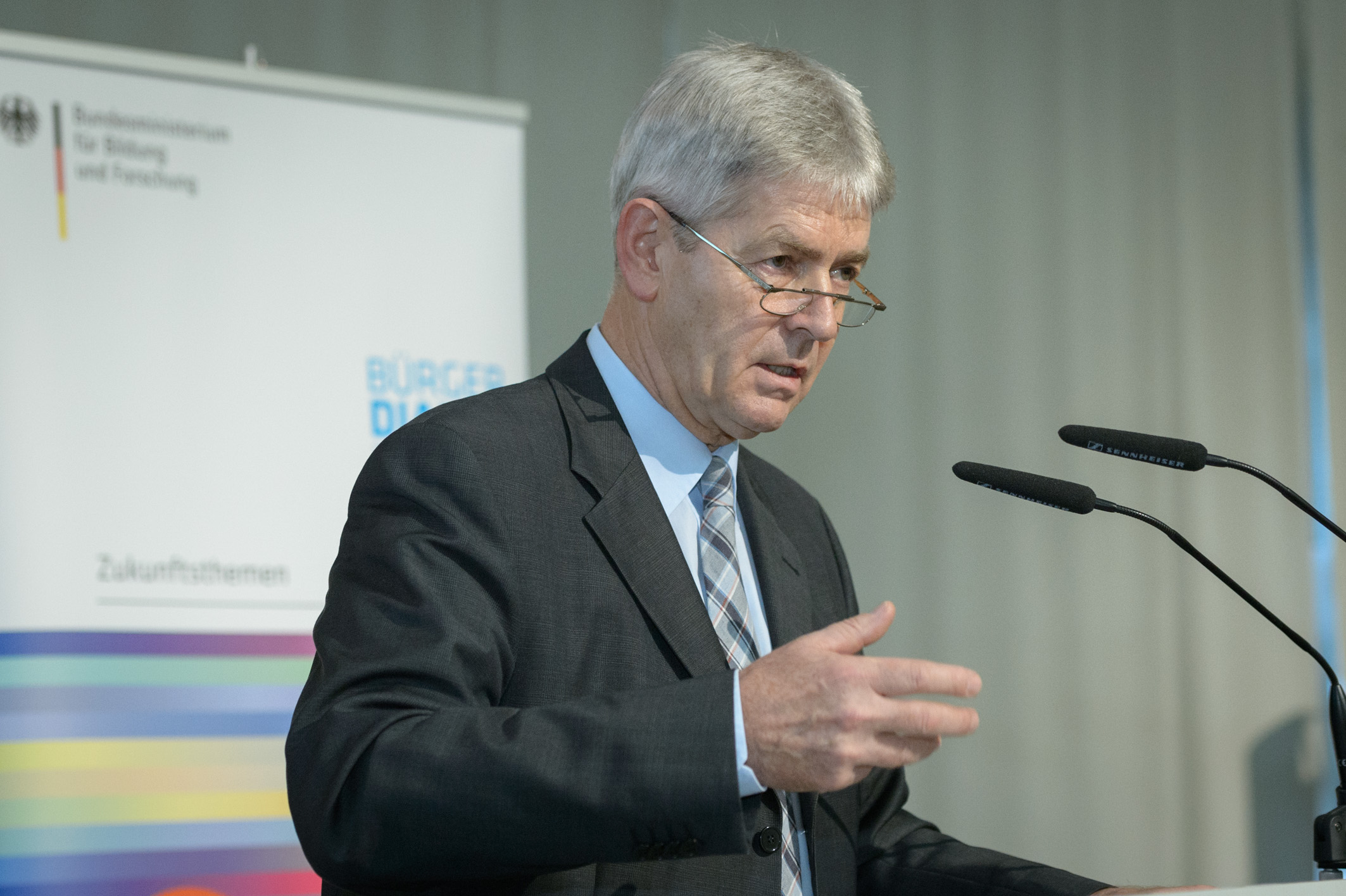
- Krüger in 2012

Lord Mayor of Neubrandenburg
- In office May 2001 – March 2015
- Preceded by: Gerd zu Jeddeloh
- Succeeded by: Silvio Witt

Minister for Education, Science, Research and Technology
- In office 13 May 1993 – 17 November 1994
- Chancellor: Helmut Kohl
- Preceded by: Matthias Wissmann
- Succeeded by: Jürgen Rüttgers

Member of the Bundestag; from Mecklenburg-Vorpommern
- In office 3 December 1990 – 14 August 2001
- Preceded by: Constituency established
- Succeeded by: Werner Kuhn
- Constituency: Volkskammer (1990); Neubrandenburg – Altentreptow – Waren – Röbel (1990–1998); State list (1998–2001)

Member of the Volkskammer; for Neubrandenburg
- In office 5 April 1990 – 2 December 1990
- Preceded by: Constituency established
- Succeeded by: Constituency abolished

Personal details
- Born: 7 March 1950 Güstrow, East Germany
- Party: Christian Democratic Union
- Children: 2
- Education: Hochschule Wismar
- Occupation: Engineer

Paul Krüger (born 7 March 1950) is a German engineer and politician of the Christian Democratic Union (CDU). He most notably served as Federal Minister for Education, Science, Research and Technology from 1993 to 1994 under Helmut Kohl. He has also been a Member of the Bundestag from 1990 to 2001, and Lord Mayor of Neubrandenburg from 2001 to 2015.

== Early life ==
Krüger was born on 7 March 1950 in Güstrow, which was then part of East Germany, as the son of a farmer and housewife. He attended a Polytechnic Secondary School, graduating in 1966. After graduating he began an apprenticeship as a lathe operator in Neubrandenburg, which he completed with in 1968. He decided to switch careers in 1969, attending Hochschule Wismar and studying mechanical engineering, completing his studies there in 1973 with a diploma in engineering. At the same school he started pursuing his higher level degrees, in 1975 graduating with a degree in mechanical engineering and in 1986 a Doctorate in Engineering. From 1973 to 1990 he worked as an engineer in a mechanical engineering company called VEB Lebensmittelgütermaschinenbau in Neubrandenburg, and in 1980 became a group leader for organization and software development in the company.

He joined politics by joining the Christian Democratic Union of East Germany, and upon the dissolution of East Germany became a member of the Christian Democratic Union of Germany in 1990. In 1990 he also became a CDU district executive in Neubrandenburg and a part of the CDU state executive committee of Mecklenburg.

== Political career ==
=== Volkshammer and Bundestag ===
Krüger was elected to the Volkskammer as part of district 11 (Neubrandenburg) in the 1990 East German general election for a few months before the reunification of Germany which led to its dissolution in October 1990. During those few months he was part of the Presidium of the Volkskammer and Managing Director of the CDU/DA parliamentary group.

He was elected to the Bundestag in the 1990 German federal election by direktmandat for Neubrandenburg - Altentreptow - Waren Röbel with 42.7% of the vote. He was again elected to that constituency in the 1994 German federal election with 43.1% of the vote, and in this session was a deputy chairman of the CDU/CSU parliamentary group. He had previously been Chairman of the Working Group of the Treuhandanstalt from March to May 1993. From 1998 to 2001 he was instead elected by state list for Mecklenburg-Western Pomerania. He formally resigned on 14 August 2001 in order to become Lord Mayor of Neubrandenburg. The last committee he served on was the Committee for the Affairs of the New States, which was one of the standing committees in that Bundestag period, as chairman of it since 1998.

=== Federal Minister for Education, Science, Research and Technology ===
On 13 May 1993, Krüger was appointed Federal Minister for Education, Science, Research and Technology in Helmut Kohl's cabinet.

Krüger said there was a "crisis not seen since 1945" that Germany was falling behind the United States and Japan in research and development and that funding for this was being rapidly cut. To combat this, he introduced funding for genetic research and to artificially produce drugs, like those to prevent hemophilia. He also focused on nuclear power, saying that there could be the responsible and safe usage of plants, as exemplified by the Niederaichbach Nuclear Power Plant where it was dismantled and no longer as radioactive. Another important thing in his term was the telecommunications infrastructure, where he pushed for the end of a monopoly, and said that with this telecommunications will contribute to a large percentage of the gross national product.

In particular, he tried to help science in the new federal states in the east, for example encouraging the building of Wendelstein 7-X in Greifswald.

He left office on 17 November 1994.

=== Mayor of Neubrandenburg ===
He became Lord Mayor of Neubrandenburg in May 2001. In the elections to become mayor, he had narrowly lost the majority against Thorsten Koplin (PDS) in the first round, which required a second round of voting which he won. He was re-elected in 2008 against Hans-Joachim Schröder. He decided not to run for re-election in March 2015, as he said he would step back at the age of 65.

After the economic collapse of the city following reunification, he attached importance to portfolio development based on the people already there. An important dispute that occurred during his time as mayor was not extending the contract with the housing company Neuwoges, and after it was reported he made this decision by Nordkurier there was a dispute between him and the city council and the CDU district executive, who accused him of "know-it-allism". Also of importance was the steep decline in population in the city, which was later rectified.

From 2003 until 2017 he was deputy state chairman of the CDU in Mecklenburg-Western Pomerania.

== Personal life ==
Krüger is a Catholic and is married with two children.

He, along with Angela Merkel, was one of the few East German politicians in politics at the time and so they often relied on moral support from one another. Thus, they became lifelong friends.

== Honours and awards ==
- Federal Cross of Merit, 1st class
