= Ina Albowitz =

German politician (born 1943)

Member of the Bundestag
- In office 20 December 1990 – 17 October 2002

Personal details
- Born: 26 April 1943 (age 83) Weimar, Greater German Reich
- Party: FDP

Ina Albowitz (born 26 August 1943) is a German politician of the Free Democratic Party (FDP) and former member of the German Bundestag.

== Life ==
From 1990 to 1998 Ina Albowitz was a member of the German Bundestag. From 1992 to 1998 she was Parliamentary Secretary of the FDP parliamentary group. On 6 June 2000 she rejoined the Bundestag as successor to the retired member of parliament Jürgen Möllemann.

== Literature ==
Herbst, Ludolf; Jahn, Bruno (2002). Vierhaus, Rudolf (ed.). Biographisches Handbuch der Mitglieder des Deutschen Bundestages. 1949–2002 [Biographical Handbook of the Members of the German Bundestag. 1949–2002] (in German). München: De Gruyter - De Gruyter Saur. p. 1715. ISBN 978-3-11-184511-1.
