= Antje Blumenthal =

German politician

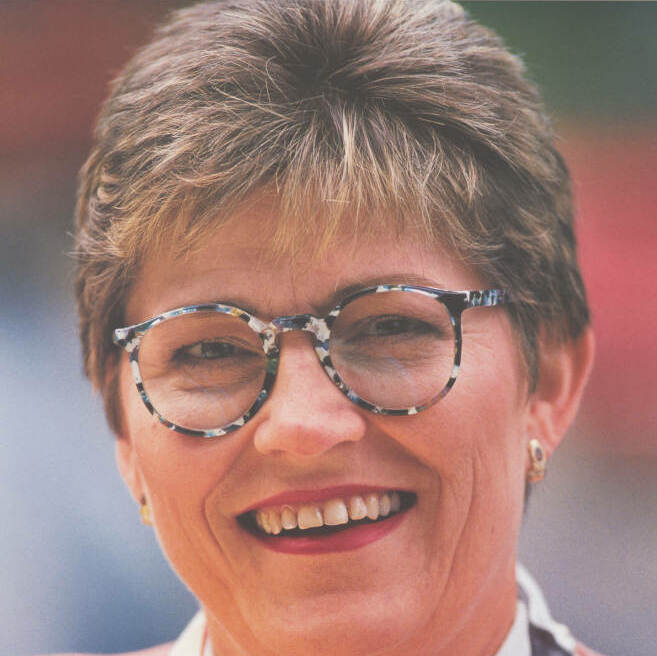
Antje Blumenthal

Antje Blumenthal (born 25 December 1947 in Itzehoe) is a German politician and member of the CDU. From 2001 to 2009, she was a member of the Bundestag.
