= Werner Kuhn (politician) =

German politician (born 1955)

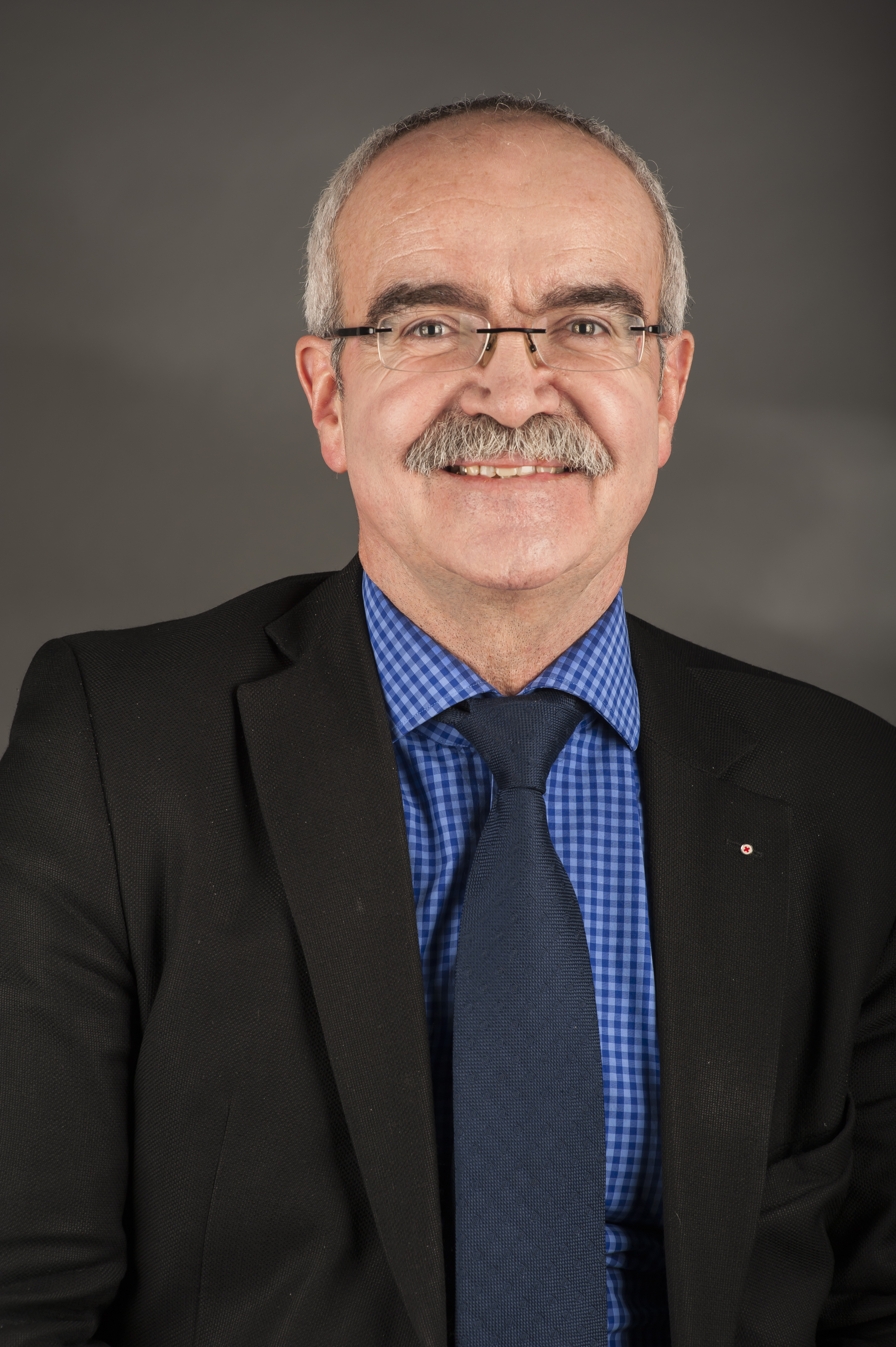
- Kuhn in 2014

Member of the European Parliament; for Germany
- In office 14 July 2009 – 1 July 2019

Member of the; Landtag of Mecklenburg-Vorpommern; for Nordvorpommern I
- In office 17 September 2006 – 16 July 2009
- Preceded by: Maika Friemann-Jennert
- Succeeded by: Torsten Renz

Member of the Bundestag; from Mecklenburg-Vorpommern
- In office 15 August 2001 – 8 October 2005
- Preceded by: Paul Krüger
- Succeeded by: Multi-member district
- Constituency: State list
- In office 10 November 1994 – 26 October 1998
- Preceded by: Elisabeth Grochtmann
- Succeeded by: Dirk Manzewski
- Constituency: Rostock-Land – Ribnitz-Damgarten – Teterow – Malchin

Personal details
- Born: 19 May 1955 (age 71) Zingst, East Germany
- Party: Christian Democratic Union
- Children: 3
- Education: University of Rostock

Werner Kuhn (born 19 May 1955) is a German politician who served as a Member of the European Parliament (MEP) from 2009 until 2019. He is a member of the Christian Democratic Union, part of the European People's Party.

== Parliamentary service ==
Kuhn has served in several of the Parliamentary committees. From 2014 he served as Vice-Chair of the Committee on Fisheries. He has also served on the Committee on Transport and Tourism, the delegation to the ACP–EU Joint Parliamentary Assembly and the Delegation for relations with Israel.
