= Wilhelm Dietzel =

German politician

Member of the Bundestag
- In office 1994–1999

Personal details
- Born: 23 July 1948 (age 77) Neudorf (Diemelstadt), West Germany (now Germany)
- Party: CDU
- Children: 3

Wilhelm Dietzel is a German politician of the Christian Democratic Union (CDU) and former member of the German Bundestag. He was Hesse's Minister for Environment, Agriculture and Forestry from 1999 to 2009.

== Life ==
Dietzel has been a member of the CDU since 1974. Dietzel was involved in local politics as a local councillor in Neudorf from 1972 to 1981, as a city councillor in Diemelstadt since 1977 and as a county councillor in the Waldeck-Frankenberg district from 1981 to 1989.

From 10 November 1994 to 1999 he was a member of the German Bundestag. He was elected via the state list of the CDU in Hesse. His successor was Wolfgang Steiger.

After the 1999 state elections in Hesse, Dietzel moved to the Hessian state government under Roland Koch on 7 April 1999 and became Hessian Minister for the Environment, Agriculture and Forestry, and since 5 April 2003 Minister for the Environment, Rural Areas and Consumer Protection. After the 2009 state elections he was succeeded by Silke Lautenschläger.
