= Gunnar Uldall =

German politician

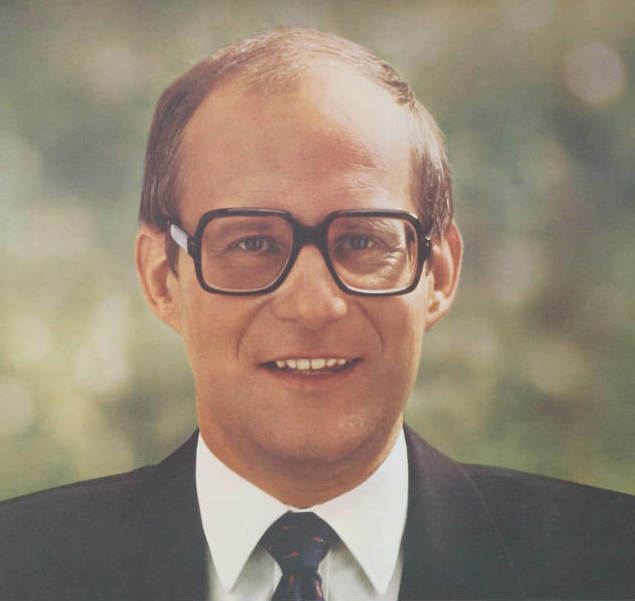

Senator of Economic Affairs and Employment
- In office 2001–2008
- Preceded by: Axel Gedaschko

Personal details
- Born: 17 November 1940 Hamburg
- Died: 14 November 2017 (aged 76) Hamburg
- Party: CDU
- Education: University of Hamburg

Gunnar Uldall (17 November 1940 – 14 November 2017) was a German politician and former state minister of Economy and Labour in Hamburg. He was a member of the Christian Democratic Union (CDU).

Uldall was born on 17 November 1940 in Hamburg, he was married with 3 children. After his Abitur in 1960 and his conscription to the armed forces (1960–1962), Uldall studied economics at the University of Hamburg and earned his degree in 1966. From 1966 he worked as a management consultant.

In 1962 Uldall became a member of the CDU and was elected to the Hamburg Parliament in 1966. He was a member of the state legislative until 1983, when he was elected to the German federal diet until 2001. From 2001 to 2008 Uldall was state minister of Economic Affairs and Employment.

Uldall died on 14 November 2017, shortly before his 77th birthday.
