= Werner Schuster (politician) =

German politician (1939–2001)

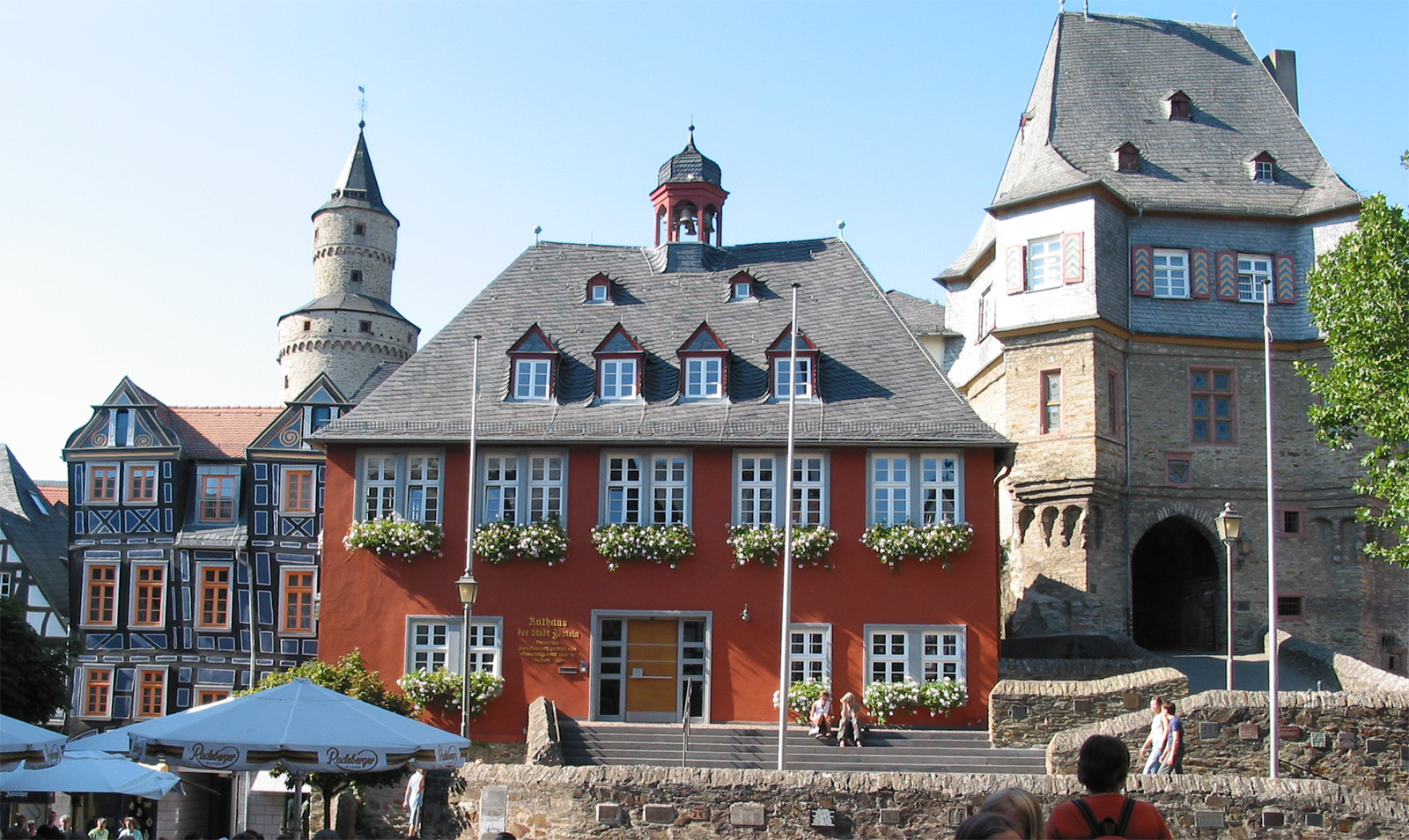
The Rathaus at Idstein, where Schuster was a city councillor from 1972 to 1989

Rudolf Werner Schuster (20 January 1939 – 9 May 2001) was a Tanganyika-born German physician, specialist in health informatics, and SPD politician.

Raised in a colonial East African household, Schuster studied medicine at the University of Tübingen in the 1960s and during his professional career worked mostly in health informatics and medical computer science. He was a city councillor at Idstein for seventeen years before serving as a member of the Bundestag from 1990 until his death. On the national stage, he concerned himself with health and Africa and the fight against AIDS.

== Early life ==
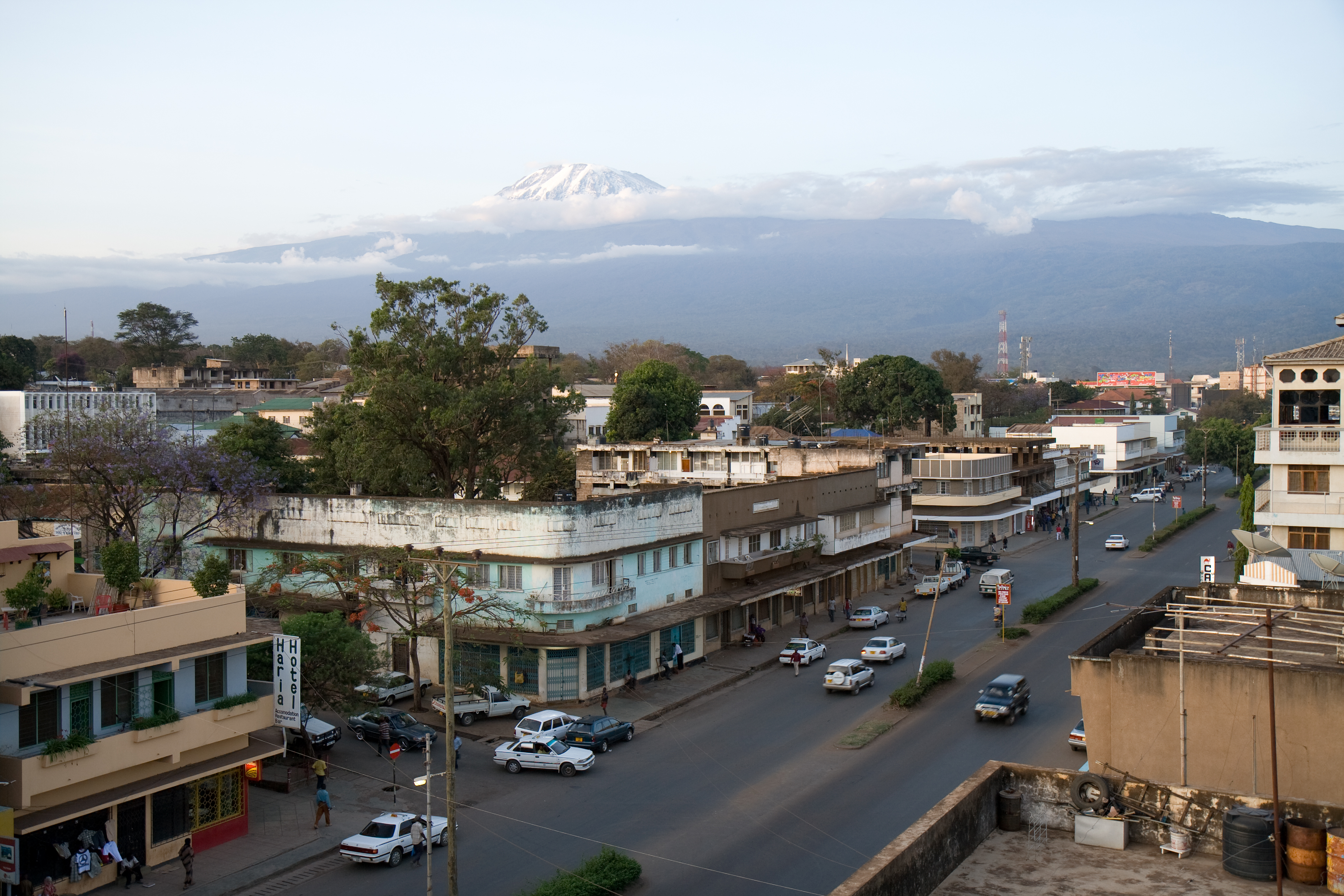
Moshi, Tanzania, with Mount Kilimanjaro in the background

Schuster was born in 1939 at Moshi in the Kilimanjaro Region of the Tanganyika Territory, now part of Tanzania, into a family of German settlers. He spent much of his childhood there before migrating to Germany with his parents, and all his life was able to speak Swahili.

In 1958 he gained his Abitur at the Gymnasium in Rosenheim, Upper Bavaria, and from 1959 to 1960 did his compulsory military service in the Mountain Infantry of the Bundeswehr. He then proceeded to Tübingen to study medicine. In 1966, he took the Staatsexamen, and the same year received his doctorate from the Physiological Institute in Tübingen.

== Medical and health informatics career ==
In 1970, Schuster gained his Approbation, or license to practice, at St Joseph's Hospital in Bremerhaven on the coast of the North Sea. From 1970 to 1983, he was head of the health department in the Hesse Centre for Data Processing at Wiesbaden. In 1971, he joined the Medical Emergency Service agency in Wiesbaden. In 1983, he received the medical computer science certificate of the Gesellschaft für medizinische Informatik und Statistik (Society for Medical Informatics and Statistics). From 1984, he worked in the municipal data processing centre at Giessen.

== Political career ==
In 1964, Schuster had joined the SPD. From 1972 to 1989, he was a city councillor at Idstein in the Taunus mountains and from 1975 to 1985 was leader of his political group. From 1985 to 1995 he was chairman of the SPD's Rheingau-Taunus-Kreis branch.

In 1985 he founded the Bürgerpartnerschaft Dritte Welt Idstein e.V. (Third World Civic Partnership Association Idstein) and later established a civic partnership between Idstein and his native Moshi. This association, later renamed Bürgerpartnerschaft Eine Welt e.V., Idstein / People Help People - One World, had the aim of achieving concrete development projects in Tanzania, focussing on the area of Moshi, at the foot of Mount Kilimanjaro. In Moshi itself, Schuster initiated the founding of a non-governmental organization called "Friends in Development Association". This sought to link its efforts to those of regional and national German NGOs.

In 1989 Schuster was elected to his local Kreistag, and at the federal election of 1990 he was sent to the Bundestag, representing Rheingau-Taunus/Limburg-Weilburg. As a member of parliament, Schuster was chiefly concerned with development and with health policy and took a particular interest in Africa and the fight against AIDS. He called for ten per cent of the gross national product of rich countries to be spent on combating poverty in the Third World.

In a debate in the Bundestag on 21 June 1991 on the situation in the Sudan, Schuster said that the bombing of United Nations and Red Cross supply depots by government forces in the south of the country was "completely perverse", and his position was supported on all sides of the chamber. After a trip to Rwanda in 1993, Schuster unsuccessfully called upon the German federal government led by Helmut Kohl to offer financial support for an enlarged United Nations peace-keeping force there. The next year, some eight hundred thousand people died in the Rwandan genocide. In matters of development policy, Schuster was respected across party boundaries. He was closely associated with Heidemarie Wieczorek-Zeul, who in 1998 became federal minister for economic cooperation and development under Gerhard Schröder, the new SPD Chancellor.

In December 1995, following the NATO bombing campaign in Bosnia, Schuster was one of only fifty-five SPD members of parliament who voted against sending four thousand German soldiers to join the IFOR international peacekeeping force in Bosnia, with the Bundestag approving the deployment by 543 votes to 107, with six abstentions and sixteen members absent.

He was married with three children. He died in Idstein on 9 May 2001, suffering from cancer of the liver.

In May 2003, on the initiative of the Bonn City Council, and in the presence of Heidemarie Wieczorek-Zeul and members of the Schuster family, a building at 201, Kaiserstrasse, was renamed the Dr. Werner Schuster Haus. It contains the offices of several NGOs with development objectives. Reinhard Hermle, chairman of VENRO (the Association of German Development NGOs), stated

On the eve of the second anniversary of the death of Werner Schuster, an outstanding figure in German development policy, we wish to honour him by the inauguration of the Dr Werner Schuster House. Anyone who had anything to do with him can tell of his constant and powerful commitment to greater justice in the world. His openness and his clarity were highly esteemed, and sometimes feared. His constituency did not end in the Taunus and the Rheingau. He wanted to bring the concerns and the needs of the poor, above all in Africa, into German politics. In that, he was a role model.
