= Petra Bläss =

German politician

Petra Bläss-Rafajlovski
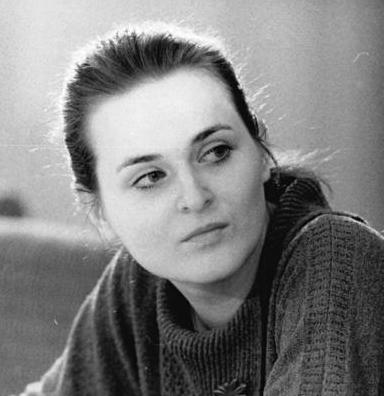
- Petra Bläss in 1990
- Born: Petra Bläss; 12 June 1964 (age 62); Leipzig, Saxony, GDR (East Germany)
- Occupations: Political activist Feminist activist Politician; Chair of East German Electoral Commission in 1990
- Political party: SED (1986-1990); PDS (1997-2005)
- Spouse: ______ Rafajlovski

Petra Bläss (since 2005, Petra Bläss-Rafajlovski: born 12 June 1964) is a German politician (formerly PDS). She served in the German parliament (Bundestag) between 1990 and 2002, and was a Bundestag vice-president between 1998 and 2002.

In 1990 she served, improbably as she thought, both at the time and subsequently, as the chair of the 50 member Electoral Commission appointed to supervise East Germany's first (and last) freely held and fairly administered general election.

== Life ==
=== Provenance and early years ===
Petra Bläss was born in Leipzig which at that time was in the heavily urbanised southern part of the German Democratic Republic (East Germany). Her father was a theatre director. Her mother was also involved in theatre work, later working at Cottbus as a prompter in a music theatre. Her sister became an actress. Her parents' marriage broke up soon after she was born, and she "grew up without a father". She grew up in Wittenberg, a small university town closely associated with Martin Luther, located some 40 km (25 miles) to the north of Leipzig.

Bläss successfully completed her school final exams ("Abitur") in 1982 which opened the way for her enrollment at the Humboldt University in Berlin where she studied History, Germanistics and Pedagogy, emerging in 1987 with a degree and a qualification as a teacher of History and German. Instead of entering the teaching profession she remained at the Humboldt till 1990, working on her doctorate. and undertaking research in Literary science in the German Studies department. The working title for her doctoral dissertation was "The presentation of war and images of peace in the dramatic output of Alfred Matusche" ("Kriegsdarstellung und Friedensbilder in der Dramatik Alfred Matusches"). This piece of work was never completed, however. In 1986 she had joined East Germany's ruling Socialist Unity Party ("Sozialistische Einheitspartei Deutschlands" / SED), "buoyed by the hope that Gorbachev's more liberal brand of socialism in the USSR might be workable in East Germany too", although sources are silent on any political involvement before 1989. As she herself later explained the matter, since there were no parties with real power ... other than the SED, joining the party was the only option there was to influence political developments.

=== Time of changes ===
Political changes accelerated during 1989 and 1990 along with accompanying uncertainty: the university let her know early in 1989 that after she had obtained her doctorate it did not expect to offer her a job, and she spent a year or so looking for suitable work in the theatre, the arts or the media, but without immediate success. In December 1989 she was a co-founder of the Independent Women's Association ("Unabhängige Frauenverband" / UFV), described by some as a "political party". A few months earlier it would have been unthinkable for anything resembling a political party to exist in the German Democratic Republic that was not directly controlled by the SED, but during the run-up to the March 1990 election the UFV was one of several new political groupings that emerged blinking from semi-secrecy. A month after helping to create the UFV, in January 1990 Bläss resigned from the SED.

Petra Bläss was asked why, at the age of 25, she had been selected to chair the 50 member electoral commission created for the March 1990 election in East Germany

"It was a real accident that I ended up running it ... It was partly [because] I was free when I was needed. It was also completely clear that I had not had a political career [in East Germany]. I told the secretary of the Electoral Commission that I had been a member of the SED party for a couple of years at university during the Gorbachev era, but no one was interested in that. They were just interested in the fact that I had been part of the Citizens' Movement ("Bürgerbewegung"). They did not want to choose an older person, for fear that bad things might come out about them later. ... normal people like you and me were suddenly thrust into positions of responsibility ... If I'd really thought about it, I would not have been able to sleep at night, because [of] the scale of the responsibility."

Petra Bläss

translated and quoted by Hester Vaizey

In February 1990 she was nominated as the UFV delegate to the 50-member electoral commission being set up ahead of the forthcoming general election and communal elections. In a secret ballot she was then elected to chair the commission, receiving 12 of the 27 votes cast. No less a person than the new prime minister, Hans Modrow himself, after first asking if he might address her as "Petra" (rather than as "Miss Bläss"), when he congratulated her on the appointment also made clear his belief that, where the opportunity presented itself, one must do something in uncertain times to support national stability, if only in order to avoid the question from members of future generations, "Why did you do nothing?". Interviewed by a journalist at the time, Bläss was unable to explain why she had been selected for the job, beyond commenting that it seemed to have to do with her involvement in the women's movement, and that she brought nothing remarkable to the job except an exceptional ability for keeping calm under pressure "even before exams".

Despite her national responsibilities, she continued to pursue her political agenda. In the evenings she involved herself in discussion groups with the UFV, with New Forum and with "Green" groups. Following the electoral success in March 1990 of the CDU in East Germany, an unstoppable momentum developed towards reunification, but the political backdrop for the re-appearance of democracy in the German Democratic Republic was seen by many activists in 1989 to have more to do with Mikhail Gorbachev than with Helmut Kohl. Petra Bläss was one of many thoughtful East Germans who harboured reservations about the steam-roller progress to a united Germany, and expressed her outrage when the first draft of the reunification treaty mentioned in just one very dismissive sentence "the needs of women and the disabled".

In June 1990 she finally abandoned any prospect of completing her doctoral dissertation, taking an editorial job with DFF, the East German state broadcasting corporation. She stayed with DFF till the end of 1990.

=== Politics in a united Germany ===
Ahead of the General election of December 1990, which was the first post-reunification election, Bläss was invited to put her name forward on the candidate list of the Party of Democratic Socialism (PDS), which was East Germany's old ruling Socialist Unity Party, now rebranded and desperately trying to re-invent itself as a left-wing mainstream party for a democratic Germany. She was not at this stage a party member (joining it formally only in January 1997) but agreed, and although the PDS only received 2.4% of the total votes, which gave it just 17 seats in the new 662 seat Bundestag, her name was high enough on the party list for her to be one of the 17, though formally she was not, at this stage, affiliated to any political party. As an academic at the Humboldt University she had not been targeted with the political persecution that had affected more politically engaged colleagues and other dissidents, and while she was critical of the abusive aspects of the old regime, she continued to respect many of the social values that had characterised East Germany. Thanks in part to a desperate labour shortage, East Germany had far outstripped West Germany in terms of female participation in the work force, and its abortion laws had also been strikingly more "progressive". Bläss never felt moved to condemn the old East German régime unreservedly. She later recalled that in the immediate aftermath of reunification the 17 Bundestag members from the PDS candidate list found themselves isolated or shunned by members of other parties. "We were shut out. We were the evil ones." Bläss nevertheless continued to sit as a Bundestag member till 2002 (by when the PDS vote share had grown to the point where it was entitled to fill 37 of the 666 seats).

Between October 1998 and October 2002 she served as a Bundestag vice-president. During this period she also spoke for the PDS in the chamber on Women's Issues and Social Policy.

After leaving the Bundestag Bläss continued to be politically involved, although in 2005 she resigned again from the PDS, asserting that membership of a political party was not compatible with the political neutrality which was a top priority for her work at the time. In recent years she has described herself as a "freelance political consultant" (" freiberufliche Politikberaterin"). Her largest series of projects arose from Germany's contribution to the Balkans Stability Pact, and has involved advising, initially, on parliamentary structures and institutions in the various countries formerly in Yugoslavia and, more recently, in Albania. One priority, reflecting a defining theme of her entire political career, concerned training women for politics and participation in civil society. After she switched her focus towards Albania she combined advising on parliamentary matters in Tirana with teaching a course on Gender studies at a university in the southeast of the country.

Petra Bläss is a member of "Atlantic Bridge" ("Atlantik-Brücke") and of the Southeast Europe Society.
