= Rainer Brinkmann (politician) =

German politician (born 1958)

Rainer Brinkmann (born 9 January 1958) is a German politician of the Social Democratic Party of Germany (SPD). He is an SPD leader in the Lippe region, and was a member of the Bundestag from 1998 to 2002.
