= Results of the 2013 German federal election =

2013 German federal election
- 22 September 2013
- All 631 seats in the Bundestag; 316 seats needed for a majority
- Turnout: 71.5% ▲0.7pp
Party	Leader	Vote %	Seats	+/–
CDU/CSU	Angela Merkel	41.5%	311	+72
SPD	Peer Steinbrück	25.7%	193	+47
Left	Klaus Ernst	8.6%	64	−12
Greens	J. Trittin/K. Göring-Eckardt	8.4%	63	−5
This lists parties that won seats. See the complete results below.
Results for the single-member constituencies
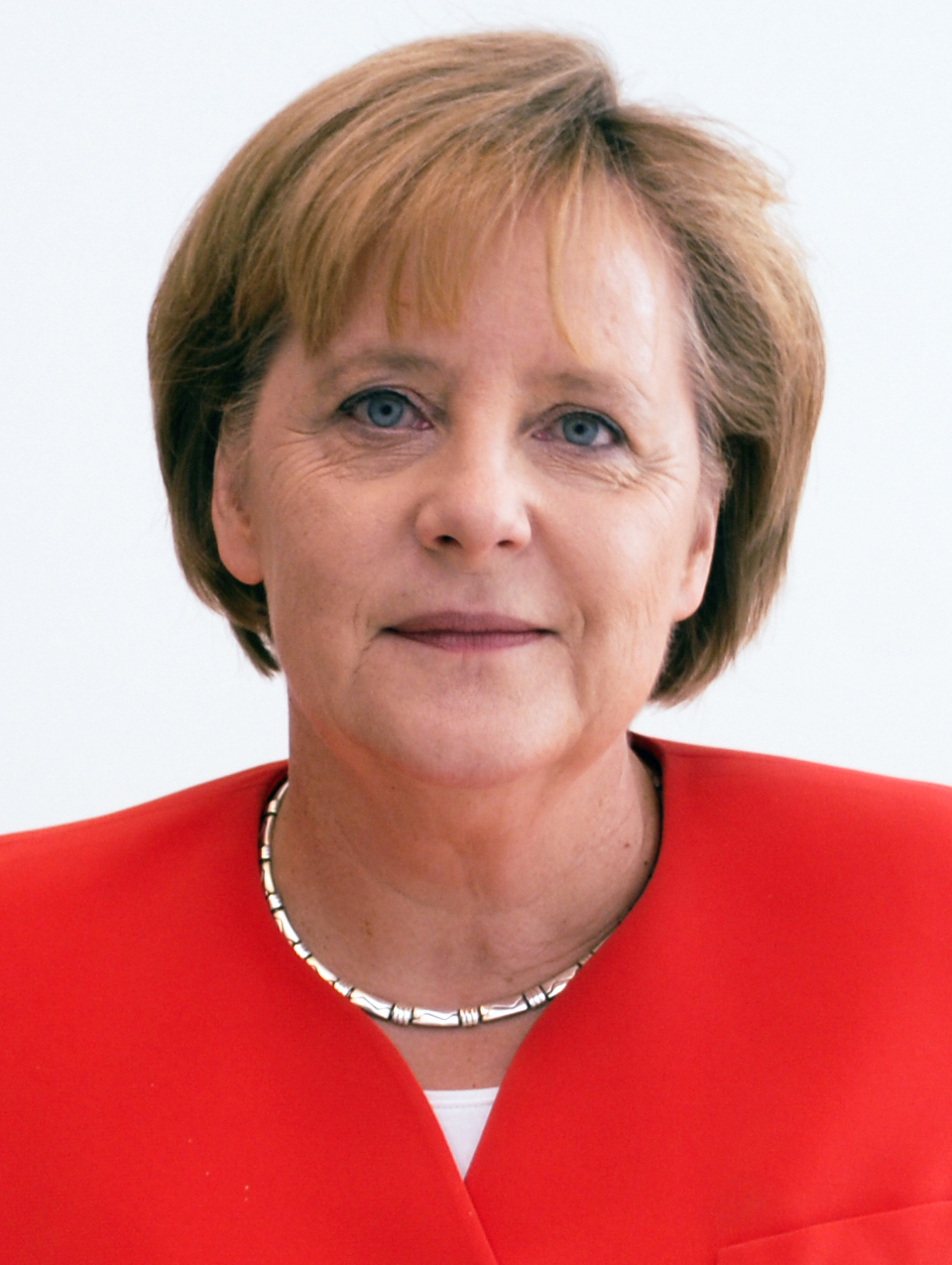

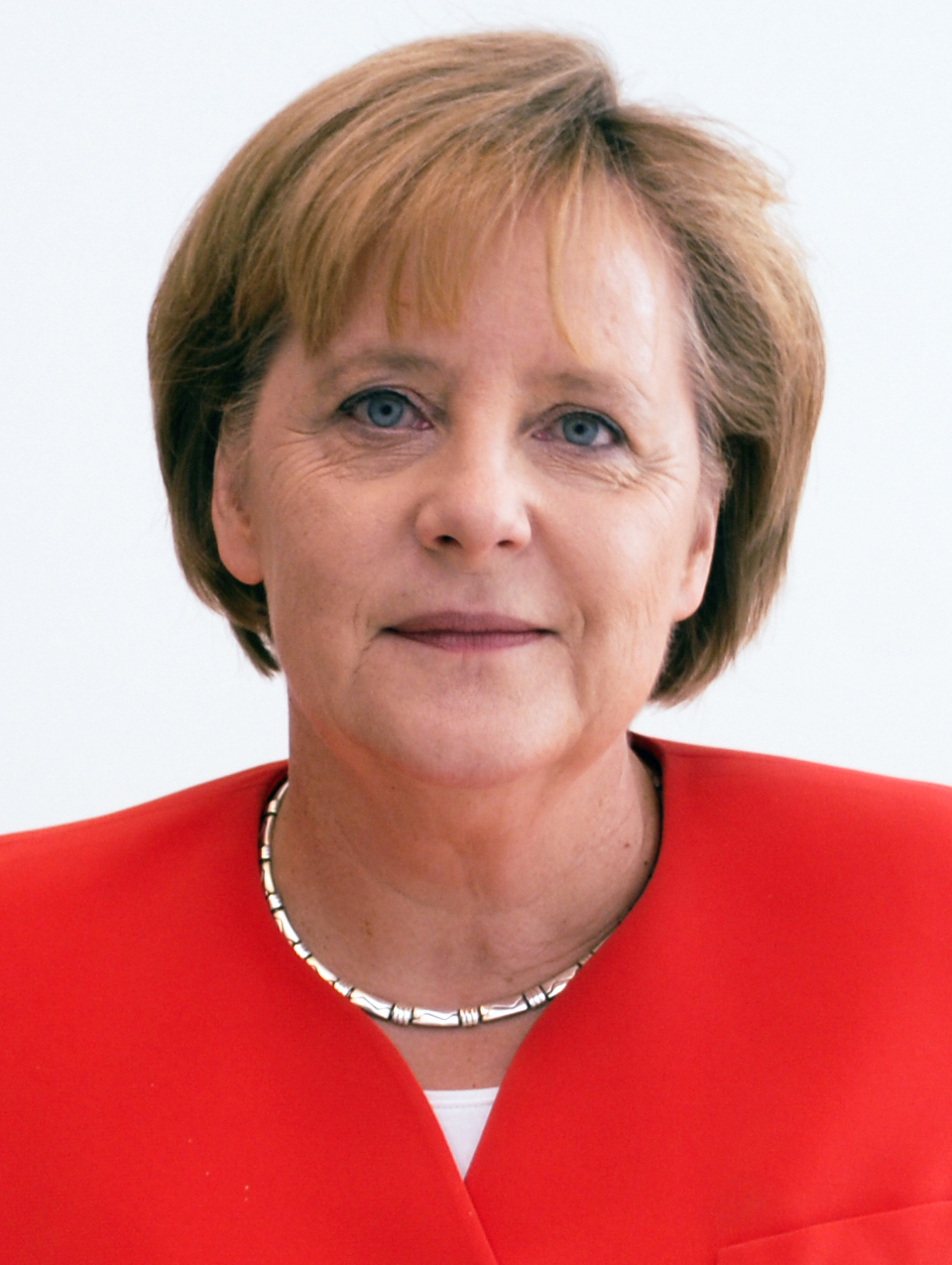
Chancellor before	Chancellor after
Angela Merkel; CDU/CSU	Angela Merkel; CDU/CSU

This is a breakdown of the results of the 2013 German federal election. The following tables display detailed results in each of the sixteen states and all 299 single-member constituencies.

== Electoral system ==
According to Article 38 of the Basic Law for the Federal Republic of Germany, members of the Bundestag shall be elected in general, direct, free, equal and secret elections; everyone over the age of eighteen is entitled to vote.

In 2008, some modifications to the electoral system were required under an order of the Federal Constitutional Court. The court had found a provision in the Federal Election Law by which it was possible for a party to experience a negative vote weight, thus losing seats due to more votes, violated the constitutional guarantee of the electoral system being equal and direct.

The court allowed three years for these changes, so the 2009 federal election was not affected. The changes were due by 30 June 2011, but appropriate legislation was not completed by that deadline. A new electoral law was enacted in late 2011, but declared unconstitutional once again by the Federal Constitutional Court upon lawsuits from the opposition parties and a group of some 4,000 private citizens.

Finally, four of the five factions in the Bundestag agreed on an electoral reform whereby the number of seats in the Bundestag will be increased as much as necessary to ensure that any overhang seats are compensated through apportioned leveling seats, to ensure full proportionality according to the political party's share of party votes at the national level. The Bundestag approved and enacted the new electoral reform in February 2013.

The Bundestag is elected using mixed-member proportional representation, as of February 2013 this means each voter has two votes, a first vote for the election of a constituency candidate (by method of first-past-the-post), and a second vote for the election of a state list. The Sainte-Laguë/Schepers method is used to convert the votes into seats, in a two-stage process with each stage involving two calculations. First, the number of seats to be allocated to each state is calculated, based on the proportion of the German population living there. Then the seats in each state are allocated to the party lists in that state, based on the proportion of second votes each party received.

In the distribution of seats among state lists, only parties that have obtained at least five percent of the valid second votes cast in the electoral area or have won a seat in at least three constituencies are taken into consideration.

The minimum number of seats for each party at federal level is then determined. This is done by calculating, for each party state list, the number of constituency seats it won on the basis of the first votes, as well as the number of seats to which it is entitled on the basis of the second votes. The higher of these two figures is the party's minimum number of seats in that state. Adding together the minimum number of seats to which the party is entitled in all of the states produces a total representing its guaranteed minimum number of seats in the country as a whole.

In order to ensure that each party receives its guaranteed minimum number of seats when the seats are allocated using the Sainte-Laguë/Schepers method, it may become necessary to increase the number of seats in the Bundestag. Then it must be ensured that the seats are distributed to the parties in line with their national share of the second votes.

Additional "overhang seats" (or "balance seats") are created to ensure that the distribution of the seats reflects the parties' share of the second votes and that no party receives fewer than its guaranteed minimum number of seats. Balance seats are also necessary to ensure that each party requires roughly the same number of second votes per seat. Once the number of seats which each party is entitled to receive across the country has been determined, the seats are allocated to the parties' individual state lists. Each state list must receive at least as many seats as the number of constituencies which the party won in the state in question.

== Nationwide ==
Party	Constituency			Party list			Total seats	+/–
Party	Votes	%	Seats	Votes	%	Seats	Total seats	+/–
Christian Democratic Union (CDU) (Note: The Christian Democratic Union and the Christian Social Union of Bavaria call themselves sister parties. They do not compete against each other in the same states and they form one group within the Bundestag.)	16,233,642	37.2	191	14,921,877	34.1	64	255	+61
Social Democratic Party (SPD)	12,843,458	29.4	58	11,252,215	25.7	135	193	+47
The Left (DIE LINKE)	3,585,178	8.2	4	3,755,699	8.6	60	64	−12
Alliance 90/The Greens (GRÜNE)	3,180,299	7.3	1	3,694,057	8.4	62	63	−5
Christian Social Union in Bavaria (CSU)	3,544,079	8.1	45	3,243,569	7.4	11	56	+11
Free Democratic Party (FDP)	1,028,645	2.4	0	2,083,533	4.8	0	0	−93
Alternative for Germany (AfD)	810,915	1.9	0	2,056,985	4.7	0	0	New
Pirate Party Germany (PIRATEN)	963,623	2.2	0	959,177	2.2	0	0	0
National Democratic Party (NPD)	635,135	1.5	0	560,828	1.3	0	0	0
Free Voters (FREIE WÄHLER)	431,640	1.0	0	423,977	1.0	0	0	New
Human Environment Animal Protection Party	4,437	0.0	0	140,366	0.3	0	0	0
Ecological Democratic Party (ÖDP)	128,209	0.3	0	127,088	0.3	0	0	0
The Republicans (REP)	27,299	0.1	0	91,193	0.2	0	0	0
Die PARTEI	39,388	0.1	0	78,674	0.2	0	0	0
Pro Germany Citizens' Movement	4,815	0.0	0	73,854	0.2	0	0	New
Bavaria Party (BP)	28,430	0.1	0	57,395	0.1	0	0	0
Democracy by Referendum (Volksabstimmung)	1,748	0.0	0	28,654	0.1	0	0	0
Pensioners' Party (RENTNER)	920	0.0	0	25,134	0.1	0	0	0
Party of Reason (PDV)	3,861	0.0	0	24,719	0.1	0	0	New
Marxist–Leninist Party (MLPD)	12,904	0.0	0	24,219	0.1	0	0	0
Party of Bible-abiding Christians (PBC)	2,081	0.0	0	18,542	0.0	0	0	0
Alliance for Innovation and Justice (BIG)	2,680	0.0	0	17,743	0.0	0	0	New
Civil Rights Movement Solidarity (BüSo)	17,988	0.0	0	12,814	0.0	0	0	0
Feminist Party (DIE FRAUEN)	–	–	–	12,148	0.0	0	0	0
Party of the Non-voters (Nichtwähler)	–	–	–	11,349	0.0	0	0	0
Alliance 21/RRP (Bündnis 21/RRP)	5,324	0.0	0	8,578	0.0	0	0	0
The Violets (DIE VIOLETTEN)	2,516	0.0	0	8,211	0.0	0	0	0
Family Party (FAMILIE)	4,478	0.0	0	7,449	0.0	0	0	0
Party for Social Equality (PSG)	–	–	–	4,564	0.0	0	0	0
The Right (DIE RECHTE)	–	–	–	2,245	0.0	0	0	New
German Communist Party (DKP)	1,699	0.0	0	–	–	–	0	0
Federation for a Complete Germany (BGD)	1,431	0.0	0	–	–	–	0	0
Bergpartei, die "ÜberPartei" (B)	624	0.0	0	–	–	–	0	New
NO! Idea (NEIN!)	290	0.0	0	–	–	–	0	New
Independents and voter groups	77,306	0.2	0	–	–	–	0	0
Valid votes	43,625,042	98.5	–	43,726,856	98.7	–	–	–
Invalid/blank votes	684,883	1.5	–	583,069	1.3	–	–	–
Total votes	44,309,925	100.0	299	44,309,925	100.0	332	631	+9
Registered voters/turnout	61,946,900	71.5	–	61,946,900	71.5	–	–	–
Source: Bundeswahlleiter

Popular vote
CDU/CSU	41.54%
SPD	25.73%
DIE LINKE	8.59%
GRÜNE	8.45%
FDP	4.76%
AfD	4.70%
PIRATEN	2.19%
Other	4.02%

Bundestag seats
CDU/CSU	49.29%
SPD	30.59%
DIE LINKE	10.14%
GRÜNE	9.98%

== Leaders' races ==
Party	Name	Constituency	Votes	%	Position	Elected?
CDU/CSU	Angela Merkel	Vorpommern-Rügen – Vorpommern-Greifswald I	87,142	56.2	1st	Elected
SPD	Peer Steinbrück	Mettmann I	52,832	34.6	2nd	Elected on list
LINKE	Gregor Gysi	Berlin-Treptow-Köpenick	61,661	42.2	1st	Elected
LINKE	7 other lead candidates: Name / Constituency / Votes / % / Position / Elected?; Sahra Wagenknecht / Düsseldorf II / 12,538 / 9.1 / 3rd / Elected on list; Jan van Aken / Hamburg-Altona / 13,759 / 10.2 / 4th / Elected on list; Dietmar Bartsch / Schwerin – Ludwigslust-Parchim I – Nordwestmecklenburg I / 32,404 / 22.2 / 3rd / Elected on list; Klaus Ernst / Schweinfurt / 7,514 / 5.4 / 4th / Elected on list; Nicole Gohlke / Munich South / 6,027 / 3.9 / 4th / Elected on list; Diana Golze / Brandenburg an der Havel – Potsdam-Mittelmark I – Havelland III – Teltow-Fläming I / 28,974 / 23.8 / 3rd / Elected on list; Caren Lay / Bautzen I / 32,452 / 21.3 / 2nd / Elected on list					
GRÜNE	Jürgen Trittin	Göttingen	16,740	10.2	3rd	Elected on list
GRÜNE	Katrin Göring-Eckardt	Thuringia party list			1st	Elected on list
FDP	Rainer Brüderle	Mainz	9,633	5.0	4th	Not elected
AfD	Bernd Lucke	Harburg	8,704	5.7	4th	Not elected

== By state ==
=== Summary ===
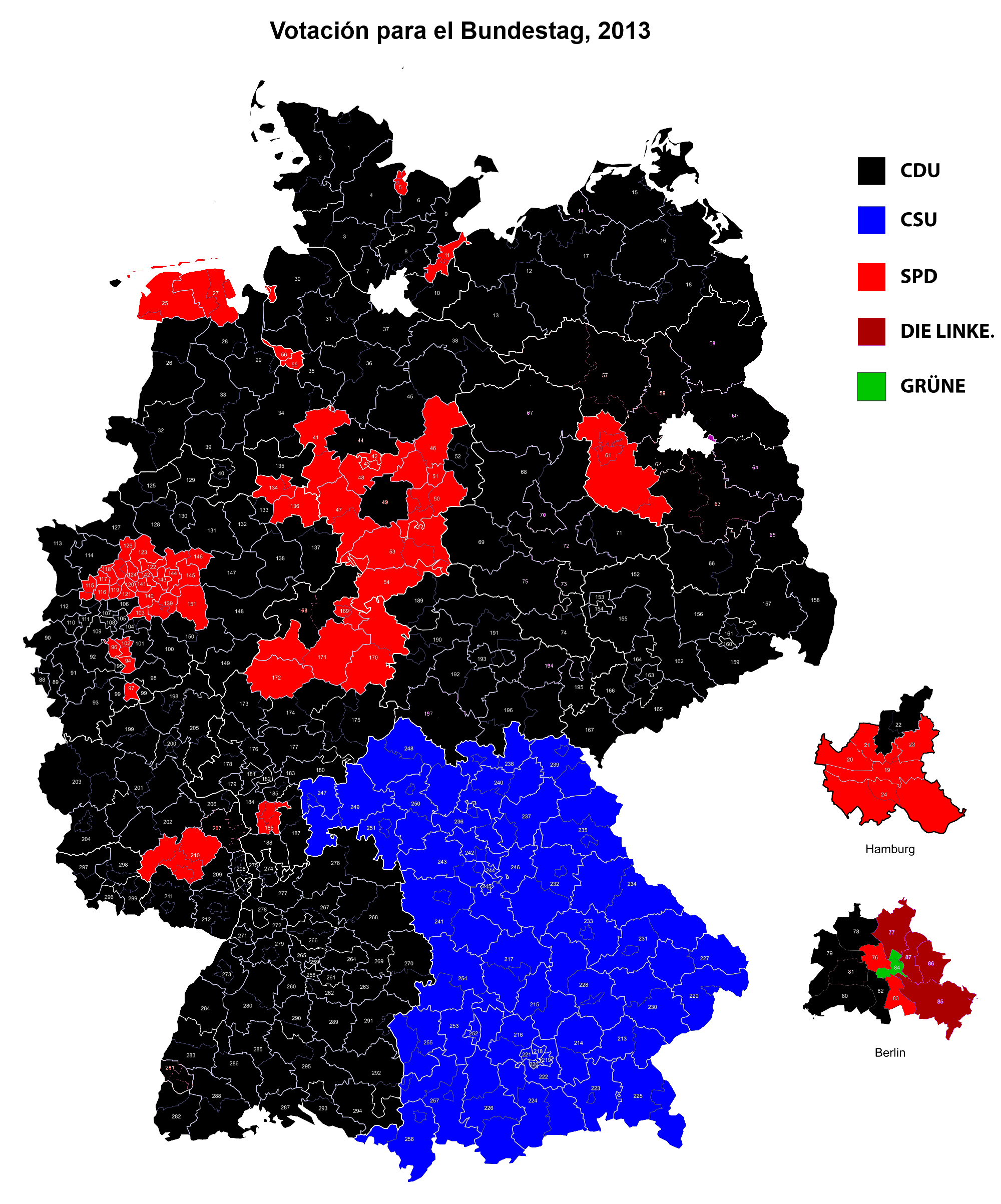
Winning party by constituency.

Results of the party list vote by state.

Party list vote share by state
State	Union	SPD	Linke	Grüne	FDP	AfD	Others
Schleswig-Holstein	39.2	31.6	5.2	9.4	5.6	4.6	4.4
Mecklenburg-Vorpommern	42.5	17.8	21.5	4.3	2.2	5.6	6.1
Hamburg	32.2	32.4	8.8	12.6	4.8	4.1	5.1
Lower Saxony	41.1	33.1	5.0	8.8	4.2	3.7	4.1
Bremen	29.3	35.7	10.1	12.1	3.4	3.7	5.7
Brandenburg	34.8	23.1	22.4	4.7	2.5	6.0	6.5
Saxony-Anhalt	41.2	18.2	23.9	4.0	2.6	4.2	5.9
Berlin	28.5	24.6	18.5	12.3	3.6	4.9	7.6
North Rhine-Westphalia	39.8	31.9	6.1	8.0	5.2	3.9	5.1
Saxony	42.6	14.6	20.0	4.9	3.1	6.8	8.0
Hesse	39.2	28.8	6.0	9.9	5.6	5.6	4.9
Thuringia	38.8	16.1	23.4	4.9	2.6	6.2	8.0
Rhineland-Palatinate	43.3	27.5	5.4	7.6	5.5	4.8	5.9
Bavaria	49.3	20.0	3.8	8.4	5.1	4.2	9.2
Baden-Württemberg	45.7	20.6	4.8	11.0	6.2	5.2	6.5
Saarland	37.8	31.0	10.0	5.7	3.8	5.2	6.5

Seats by state
State	Distribution	Total
Schleswig-Holstein	1 / 9 / 3 / 11	24
Mecklenburg-Vorpommern	3 / 3 / 1 / 6	13
Hamburg	1 / 5 / 2 / 5	13
Lower Saxony	4 / 25 / 6 / 31	66
Bremen	1 / 2 / 1 / 2	6
Brandenburg	5 / 5 / 1 / 9	20
Saxony-Anhalt	5 / 4 / 1 / 9	19
Berlin	6 / 8 / 4 / 9	27
North Rhine-Westphalia	10 / 52 / 13 / 63	138
Saxony	8 / 6 / 2 / 17	33
Hesse	3 / 16 / 5 / 21	45
Thuringia	5 / 3 / 1 / 9	18
Rhineland-Palatinate	2 / 10 / 3 / 16	31
Bavaria	4 / 22 / 9 / 56	91
Baden-Württemberg	5 / 20 / 10 / 43	78
Saarland	1 / 3 / 1 / 4	9
Germany	64 / 193 / 63 / 311	631

=== Schleswig-Holstein ===
Party	Constituency			Party list			Total seats	+/–
Party	Votes	%	Seats	Votes	%	Seats	Total seats	+/–
Christian Democratic Union (CDU)	708,702	43.6	9	638,756	39.2	2	11	+2
Social Democratic Party (SPD)	596,882	36.7	2	513,725	31.5	7	9	+3
Alliance 90/The Greens (GRÜNE)	111,921	6.9	0	153,137	9.4	3	3	0
Free Democratic Party (FDP)	37,526	2.3	0	91,714	5.6	0	0	−4
The Left (DIE LINKE)	66,183	4.1	0	84,177	5.2	1	1	−1
Alternative for Germany (AfD)	58,681	3.6	0	74,346	4.6	0	0	New
Pirate Party Germany	31,621	1.9	0	32,217	2.0	0	0	0
Human Environment Animal Protection Party	–	–	–	12,878	0.8	0	0	0
National Democratic Party	11,031	0.7	0	11,229	0.7	0	0	0
Free Voters	2,678	0.2	0	8,747	0.5	0	0	New
Pensioners' Party	920	0.1	0	6,843	0.4	0	0	0
Marxist–Leninist Party	–	–	–	521	0.0	0	0	0
Others & Independents	853	0.1	0	–	–	–	0	–
Invalid/blank votes	16,172	–	–	17,460	–	–	–	–
Total	1,645,750	100	11	1,645,750	100	13	24	0
Registered voters/turnout	2,251,796	73.1	–	2,251,796	73.1	–	–	–
Source: Federal Returning Officer

Constituency members
#	Constituency	Previous member	Elected member	Party	Votes	%	Margin	Runner-up
1	Flensburg – Schleswig	Wolfgang Börnsen	Sabine Sütterlin-Waack	CDU	68,235	42.5	8,517	Dirk Peddinghaus
2	Nordfriesland – Dithmarschen Nord	Ingbert Liebing	Ingbert Liebing	CDU	64,678	49.8	22,964	Matthias Ilgen
3	Steinburg – Dithmarschen Süd	Rolf Koschorrek	Mark Helfrich	CDU	56,669	45.4	14,193	Karin Thissen
4	Rendsburg-Eckernförde	Johann Wadephul	Johann Wadephul	CDU	66,775	45.2	12,378	Sönke Rix
5	Kiel	Hans-Peter Bartels	Hans-Peter Bartels	SPD	62,271	43.0	14,346	Thomas Stritzl
6	Plön – Neumünster	Philipp Murmann	Philipp Murmann	CDU	54,833	43.7	7,748	Birgit Malecha-Nissen
7	Pinneberg	Ole Schröder	Ole Schröder	CDU	80,483	45.4	16,477	Ernst Dieter Rossmann
8	Segeberg – Stormarn-Mitte	Gero Storjohann	Gero Storjohann	CDU	82,471	45.4	18,473	Franz Thönnes
9	Ostholstein – Stormarn-Nord	Ingo Gädechens	Ingo Gädechens	CDU	59,783	45.9	11,434	Bettina Hagedorn
10	Herzogtum Lauenburg – Stormarn-Süd	Norbert Brackmann	Norbert Brackmann	CDU	81,954	45.2	19,205	Nina Scheer
11	Lübeck	Gabriele Hiller-Ohm	Gabriele Hiller-Ohm	SPD	50,119	40.7	5,223	Alexandra Dinges-Dierig

List members
SPD	GRÜNE	CDU	LINKE
Bettina Hagedorn; Matthias Ilgen; Birgit Malecha-Nissen; Sönke Rix; Ernst Dieter Rossmann; Nina Scheer; Franz Thönnes	Luise Amtsberg; Konstantin von Notz; Valerie Wilms	Alexandra Dinges-Dierig; Thomas Stritzl	Cornelia Möhring

=== Mecklenburg-Vorpommern ===
Party	Constituency			Party list			Total seats	+/–
Party	Votes	%	Seats	Votes	%	Seats	Total seats	+/–
Christian Democratic Union (CDU)	384,607	44.4	6	369,048	42.5	0	6	0
The Left (DIE LINKE)	165,660	19.1	0	186,871	21.5	3	3	0
Social Democratic Party (SPD)	204,479	23.6	0	154,431	17.8	3	3	+1
Alternative for Germany (AfD)	–	–	–	48,885	5.6	0	0	New
Alliance 90/The Greens (GRÜNE)	33,232	3.8	0	37,716	4.3	1	1	0
National Democratic Party	29,218	3.4	0	23,735	2.7	0	0	0
Free Democratic Party (FDP)	11,891	1.4	0	18,968	2.2	0	0	−1
Pirate Party Germany	19,783	2.3	0	16,563	1.9	0	0	0
Free Voters	11,713	1.4	0	8,004	0.9	0	0	New
Pro Germany Citizens' Movement	–	–	–	1,693	0.2	0	0	New
Marxist–Leninist Party	1,036	0.1	0	1,166	0.1	0	0	0
The Republicans	–	–	–	663	0.1	0	0	0
Others & Independents	4,125	0.5	0	–	–	–	0	–
Invalid/blank votes	15,974	–	–	13,975	–	–	–	–
Total	881,718	100	6	881,718	100	7	13	0
Registered voters/turnout	1,350,705	65.3	–	1,350,705	65.3	–	–	–
Source: Federal Returning Officer

Constituency members
#	Constituency	Previous member	Elected member	Party	Votes	%	Margin	Runner-up
12	Schwerin – Ludwigslust-Parchim I – Nordwestmecklenburg I	Dietrich Monstadt	Dietrich Monstadt	CDU	56,966	39.0	19,102	Hans-Joachim Hacker
13	Ludwigslust-Parchim II – Nordwestmecklenburg II – Landkreis Rostock I	Karin Strenz	Karin Strenz	CDU	57,917	43.0	27,105	Martina Bunge
14	Rostock – Landkreis Rostock II	Steffen Bockhahn	Peter Stein	CDU	52,661	35.1	6,501	Steffen Bockhahn
15	Vorpommern-Rügen – Vorpommern-Greifswald I	Angela Merkel	Angela Merkel	CDU	87,142	56.2	57,295	Kerstin Kassner
16	Mecklenburgische Seenplatte I – Vorpommern-Greifswald II	New seat	Matthias Lietz	CDU	67,069	45.9	32,097	Torsten Koplin
17	Mecklenburgische Seenplatte II – Landkreis Rostock III	Eckhardt Rehberg	Eckhardt Rehberg	CDU	62,852	47.0	32,568	Heidrun Bluhm

List members
SPD	LINKE	GRÜNE
Frank Junge; Jeannine Pflugradt; Sonja Steffen	Dietmar Bartsch; Heidrun Bluhm; Kerstin Kassner	Harald Terpe

=== Hamburg ===
Party	Constituency			Party list			Total seats	+/–
Party	Votes	%	Seats	Votes	%	Seats	Total seats	+/–
Social Democratic Party (SPD)	336,337	37.8	5	288,902	32.4	0	5	+1
Christian Democratic Union (CDU)	305,979	34.4	1	285,927	32.1	4	5	+1
Alliance 90/The Greens (GRÜNE)	94,473	10.6	0	112,826	12.7	2	2	0
The Left (DIE LINKE)	66,995	7.5	0	78,296	8.8	1	1	0
Free Democratic Party (FDP)	17,707	2.0	0	42,869	4.8	0	0	−2
Alternative for Germany (AfD)	29,835	3.4	0	37,142	4.2	0	0	New
Pirate Party Germany	22,175	2.5	0	24,505	2.8	0	0	0
National Democratic Party	5,738	0.6	0	5,658	0.6	0	0	0
Die PARTEI	3,097	0.3	0	5,643	0.6	0	0	New
Pensioners' Party	–	–	–	3,819	0.4	0	0	0
Free Voters	3,725	0.4	0	2,856	0.3	0	0	New
Ecological Democratic Party	637	0.1	0	1,963	0.2	0	0	0
Marxist–Leninist Party	135	0.0	0	423	0.0	0	0	0
Others & Independents	3,120	0.4	0	–	–	–	0	–
Invalid/blank votes	11,260	–	–	10,384	–	–	–	–
Total	901,213	100	6	901,213	100	7	13	0
Registered voters/turnout	1,281,918	70.3	–	1,281,918	70.3	–	–	–
Source: Federal Returning Officer

Constituency members
#	Constituency	Previous member	Elected member	Party	Votes	%	Margin	Runner-up
18	Hamburg-Mitte	Johannes Kahrs	Johannes Kahrs	SPD	64,997	39.2	18,244	Dirk Marx
19	Hamburg-Altona	Olaf Scholz	Matthias Bartke	SPD	46,918	34.9	3,309	Marcus Weinberg
20	Hamburg-Eimsbüttel	Rüdiger Kruse	Niels Annen	SPD	53,105	37.5	5,993	Rüdiger Kruse
21	Hamburg-Nord	Dirk Fischer	Dirk Fischer	CDU	64,459	39.7	8,038	Christian Carstensen
22	Hamburg-Wandsbek	Jürgen Klimke	Aydan Özoğuz	SPD	58,029	40.0	4,027	Frank Schira
23	Hamburg-Bergedorf – Harburg	Hans-Ulrich Klose	Metin Hakverdi	SPD	56,867	40.4	6,823	Herlind Gundelach

List members
CDU	GRÜNE	LINKE
Herlind Gundelach; Jürgen Klimke; Rüdiger Kruse; Marcus Weinberg	Anja Hajduk; Manuel Sarrazin	Jan van Aken

=== Lower Saxony ===
Party	Constituency			Party list			Total seats	+/–
Party	Votes	%	Seats	Votes	%	Seats	Total seats	+/–
Christian Democratic Union (CDU)	1,946,518	43.9	17	1,825,592	41.1	14	31	+10
Social Democratic Party (SPD)	1,699,556	38.3	13	1,470,005	33.1	12	25	+6
Alliance 90/The Greens (GRÜNE)	299,885	6.8	0	391,901	8.8	6	6	−1
The Left (DIE LINKE)	189,645	4.3	0	223,935	5.0	4	4	−2
Free Democratic Party (FDP)	82,291	1.9	0	185,647	4.2	0	0	−9
Alternative for Germany (AfD)	82,424	1.9	0	165,875	3.7	0	0	New
Pirate Party Germany	60,736	1.4	0	74,601	1.7	0	0	0
National Democratic Party	41,103	0.9	0	37,415	0.8	0	0	0
Human Environment Animal Protection Party	–	–	–	33,809	0.8	0	0	0
Free Voters	29,234	0.7	0	21,773	0.5	0	0	New
Party of Bible-abiding Christians	2,081	0.0	0	5,664	0.1	0	0	0
Pro Germany Citizens' Movement	–	–	–	4,990	0.1	0	0	New
The Republicans	–	–	–	2,786	0.1	0	0	0
Marxist–Leninist Party	259	0.0	0	1,267	0.0	0	0	0
Family Party	1,022	0.0	0	–	–	–	0	0
Alliance 21/RRP	511	0.0	0	–	–	–	0	0
Alliance for Innovation & Justice	252	0.0	0	–	–	–	0	New
Others & Independents	2,041	0.0	0	–	–	–	0	–
Invalid/blank votes	53,723	–	–	46,021	–	–	–	–
Total	4,491,281	100	30	4,491,281	100	36	66	+4
Registered voters/turnout	6,117,473	73.4	–	6,117,473	73.4	–	–	–
Source: Federal Returning Officer

Constituency members
#	Constituency	Previous member	Elected member	Party	Votes	%	Margin	Runner-up
24	Aurich – Emden	Garrelt Duin	Johann Saathoff	SPD	66,348	50.2	23,611	Heiko Schmelzle
25	Unterems	Gitta Connemann	Gitta Connemann	CDU	90,236	54.7	38,827	Markus Paschke
26	Friesland – Wilhelmshaven – Wittmund	Karin Evers-Meyer	Karin Evers-Meyer	SPD	58,178	44.1	5,903	Hans-Werner Kammer
27	Oldenburg – Ammerland	Thomas Kossendey	Dennis Rohde	SPD	60,547	37.4	1,022	Stephan Albani
28	Delmenhorst – Wesermarsch – Oldenburg-Land	Astrid Grotelüschen	Astrid Grotelüschen	CDU	63,832	39.7	576	Susanne Mittag
29	Cuxhaven – Stade II	Enak Ferlemann	Enak Ferlemann	CDU	63,431	46.8	14,036	Gunnar Wegener
30	Stade I – Rotenburg II	Martina Krogmann	Oliver Grundmann	CDU	68,545	47.6	19,434	Oliver Kellmer
31	Mittelems	Hermann Kues	Albert Stegemann	CDU	99,705	59.0	50,802	Daniela De Ridder
32	Cloppenburg – Vechta	Franz-Josef Holzenkamp	Franz-Josef Holzenkamp	CDU	101,015	66.3	68,593	Gabriele Groneberg
33	Diepholz – Nienburg I	Axel Knoerig	Axel Knoerig	CDU	66,862	47.5	19,795	Christoph Lanzendörfer
34	Osterholz – Verden	Andreas Mattfeldt	Andreas Mattfeldt	CDU	63,174	44.0	9,514	Christina Jantz
35	Rotenburg I – Heidekreis	Reinhard Grindel	Reinhard Grindel	CDU	54,448	44.8	5,147	Lars Klingbeil
36	Harburg	Michael Grosse-Brömer	Michael Grosse-Brömer	CDU	68,458	45.2	20,550	Svenja Stadler
37	Lüchow-Dannenberg – Lüneburg	Eckhard Pols	Eckhard Pols	CDU	52,644	39.8	8,153	Hiltrud Lotze
38	Osnabrück-Land	Georg Schirmbeck	André Berghegger	CDU	76,179	53.1	29,814	Rainer Spiering
39	Stadt Osnabrück	Mathias Middelberg	Mathias Middelberg	CDU	64,416	45.7	15,357	Martin Schwanholz
40	Nienburg II – Schaumburg	Sebastian Edathy	Sebastian Edathy	SPD	62,641	44.6	4,292	Maik Beermann
41	Stadt Hannover I	Kerstin Tack	Kerstin Tack	SPD	55,711	43.5	9,061	Wilfried Lorenz
42	Stadt Hannover II	Edelgard Bulmahn	Edelgard Bulmahn	SPD	59,686	42.8	12,506	Ursula von der Leyen
43	Hannover-Land I	Caren Marks	Hendrik Hoppenstedt	CDU	77,509	44.3	10,069	Caren Marks
44	Celle – Uelzen	Henning Otte	Henning Otte	CDU	75,369	48.5	22,132	Kirsten Lühmann
45	Gifhorn – Peine	Hubertus Heil	Hubertus Heil	SPD	69,259	43.2	1,891	Ingrid Pahlmann
46	Hameln-Pyrmont – Holzminden	Gabriele Lösekrug-Möller	Gabriele Lösekrug-Möller	SPD	57,484	42.3	3,758	Michael Vietz
47	Hannover-Land II	Matthias Miersch	Matthias Miersch	SPD	78,433	43.4	2,672	Maria Flachsbarth
48	Hildesheim	Bernhard Brinkmann	Ute Bertram	CDU	68,653	42.3	1,667	Bernd Westphal
49	Salzgitter – Wolfenbüttel	Sigmar Gabriel	Sigmar Gabriel	SPD	70,080	46.6	14,360	Uwe Lagosky
50	Braunschweig	Carola Reimann	Carola Reimann	SPD	61,952	43.6	12,242	Carsten Müller
51	Helmstedt – Wolfsburg	Günter Lach	Günter Lach	CDU	58,760	44.7	7,934	Heinz-Joachim Barchmann
52	Goslar – Northeim – Osterode	Wilhelm Priesmeier	Wilhelm Priesmeier	SPD	62,209	42.4	486	Roy Kühne
53	Göttingen	Thomas Oppermann	Thomas Oppermann	SPD	66,192	40.4	3,634	Fritz Güntzler

List members
CDU	SPD	GRÜNE	LINKE
Stephan Albani; Maik Beermann; Maria Flachsbarth; Fritz Güntzler; Hans-Werner Kammer; Roy Kühne; Uwe Lagosky; Ursula von der Leyen; Wilfried Lorenz; Carsten Müller; Ingrid Pahlmann; Heiko Schmelzle; Michael Vietz; Barbara Woltmann	Heinz-Joachim Barchmann; Daniela De Ridder; Christina Jantz; Lars Klingbeil; Hiltrud Lotze; Kirsten Lühmann; Caren Marks; Susanne Mittag; Markus Paschke; Rainer Spiering; Svenja Stadler; Bernd Westphal	Katja Keul; Sven-Christian Kindler; Peter Meiwald; Brigitte Pothmer; Jürgen Trittin; Julia Verlinden	Herbert Behrens; Diether Dehm; Jutta Krellmann; Pia Zimmermann

=== Bremen ===
Party	Constituency			Party list			Total seats	+/–
Party	Votes	%	Seats	Votes	%	Seats	Total seats	+/–
Social Democratic Party (SPD)	133,437	40.6	2	117,204	35.6	0	2	0
Christian Democratic Union (CDU)	97,265	29.6	0	96,459	29.3	2	2	+1
Alliance 90/The Greens (GRÜNE)	37,667	11.5	0	40,014	12.1	1	1	0
The Left (DIE LINKE)	28,521	8.7	0	33,284	10.1	1	1	0
Alternative for Germany (AfD)	10,764	3.3	0	12,307	3.7	0	0	New
Free Democratic Party (FDP)	6,360	1.9	0	11,204	3.4	0	0	−1
Pirate Party Germany	8,831	2.7	0	8,455	2.6	0	0	0
National Democratic Party	3,796	1.2	0	3,640	1.1	0	0	0
Human Environment Animal Protection Party	–	–	–	3,465	1.1	0	0	0
Die PARTEI	1,531	0.5	0	1,549	0.5	0	0	New
Free Voters	–	–	–	814	0.2	0	0	New
Pro Germany Citizens' Movement	–	–	–	466	0.1	0	0	New
Alliance 21/RRP	432	0.1	0	395	0.1	0	0	0
Marxist–Leninist Party	207	0.1	0	156	0.0	0	0	0
Invalid/blank votes	4,211	–	–	3,610	–	–	–	–
Total	333,022	100	2	333,022	100	4	6	0
Registered voters/turnout	483,823	68.8	–	483,823	68.8	–	–	–
Source: Federal Returning Officer

Constituency members
#	Constituency	Previous member	Elected member	Party	Votes	%	Margin	Runner-up
54	Bremen I	Carsten Sieling	Carsten Sieling	SPD	69,161	37.9	13,963	Elisabeth Motschmann
55	Bremen II – Bremerhaven	Uwe Beckmeyer	Uwe Beckmeyer	SPD	64,276	43.9	22,209	Bettina Hornhues

List members
CDU	GRÜNE	LINKE
Bettina Hornhues; Elisabeth Motschmann	Marieluise Beck	Agnes Alpers

=== Brandenburg ===
Party	Constituency			Party list			Total seats	+/–
Party	Votes	%	Seats	Votes	%	Seats	Total seats	+/–
Christian Democratic Union (CDU)	492,236	35.6	9	482,601	34.8	0	9	+4
Social Democratic Party (SPD)	367,713	26.6	1	321,174	23.1	4	5	0
The Left (DIE LINKE)	330,627	23.9	0	311,312	22.4	5	5	−1
Alternative for Germany (AfD)	–	–	–	83,075	6.0	0	0	New
Alliance 90/The Greens (GRÜNE)	53,549	3.9	0	65,182	4.7	1	1	0
National Democratic Party	46,702	3.4	0	35,578	2.6	0	0	0
Free Democratic Party (FDP)	21,252	1.5	0	35,365	2.5	0	0	−2
Pirate Party Germany	39,472	2.9	0	30,785	2.2	0	0	0
Free Voters	9,860	0.7	0	13,416	1.0	0	0	New
Pro Germany Citizens' Movement	–	–	–	5,805	0.4	0	0	New
The Republicans	924	0.1	0	2,488	0.2	0	0	0
Marxist–Leninist Party	–	–	–	1,581	0.1	0	0	0
German Communist Party	1,207	0.1	0	–	–	–	0	0
Die PARTEI	901	0.1	0	–	–	–	0	New
Others & Independents	19,202	1.4	0	–	–	–	0	–
Invalid/blank votes	29,140	–	–	24,423	–	–	–	–
Total	1,412,785	100	10	1,412,785	100	10	20	+1
Registered voters/turnout	2,065,944	68.4	–	2,065,944	68.4	–	–	–
Source: Federal Returning Officer

Constituency members
#	Constituency	Previous member	Elected member	Party	Votes	%	Margin	Runner-up
56	Prignitz – Ostprignitz-Ruppin – Havelland I	Dagmar Ziegler	Sebastian Steineke	CDU	34,115	33.5	4,036	Dagmar Ziegler
57	Uckermark – Barnim I	Sabine Stüber	Jens Koeppen	CDU	38,394	38.9	12,721	Sabine Stüber
58	Oberhavel – Havelland II	Angelika Krüger-Leißner	Uwe Feiler	CDU	65,081	37.5	16,413	Angelika Krüger-Leißner
59	Märkisch-Oderland – Barnim II	Dagmar Enkelmann	Hans-Georg von der Marwitz	CDU	58,210	34.0	1,819	Dagmar Enkelmann
60	Brandenburg an der Havel – Potsdam-Mittelmark I – Havelland III – Teltow-Fläming I	Frank-Walter Steinmeier	Frank-Walter Steinmeier	SPD	40,306	33.1	333	Andrea Voßhoff
61	Potsdam – Potsdam-Mittelmark II – Teltow-Fläming II	Andrea Wicklein	Katherina Reiche	CDU	58,399	32.6	730	Andrea Wicklein
62	Dahme-Spreewald – Teltow-Fläming III – Oberspreewald-Lausitz I	Peter Danckert	Jana Schimke	CDU	61,487	37.0	16,409	Tina Fischer
63	Frankfurt (Oder) – Oder-Spree	Thomas Nord	Martin Patzelt	CDU	44,822	33.9	7,814	Thomas Nord
64	Cottbus – Spree-Neiße	Wolfgang Nešković	Klaus-Peter Schulze	CDU	44,301	35.9	14,791	Ulrich Freese
65	Elbe-Elster – Oberspreewald-Lausitz II	Michael Stübgen	Michael Stübgen	CDU	47,454	40.9	20,317	Matthias Mnich

List members
LINKE	SPD	GRÜNE
Diana Golze; Norbert Müller; Harald Petzold; Kirsten Tackmann; Birgit Wöllert	Ulrich Freese; Andrea Wicklein; Dagmar Ziegler; Stefan Zierke	Annalena Baerbock

=== Saxony-Anhalt ===
Party	Constituency			Party list			Total seats	+/–
Party	Votes	%	Seats	Votes	%	Seats	Total seats	+/–
Christian Democratic Union (CDU)	491,418	41.8	9	485,781	41.2	0	9	+4
The Left (DIE LINKE)	299,032	25.4	0	282,319	23.9	5	5	−1
Social Democratic Party (SPD)	230,859	19.6	0	214,731	18.2	4	4	+1
Alternative for Germany (AfD)	16,657	1.4	0	49,661	4.2	0	0	New
Alliance 90/The Greens (GRÜNE)	38,929	3.3	0	46,858	4.0	1	1	0
Free Democratic Party (FDP)	20,679	1.8	0	30,998	2.6	0	0	−2
National Democratic Party	26,085	2.2	0	25,900	2.2	0	0	0
Pirate Party Germany	25,756	2.2	0	22,753	1.9	0	0	0
Free Voters	18,070	1.5	0	12,358	1.0	0	0	New
Pro Germany Citizens' Movement	–	–	–	3,680	0.3	0	0	New
Ecological Democratic Party	–	–	–	1,978	0.2	0	0	0
Marxist–Leninist Party	1,241	0.1	0	1,798	0.2	0	0	0
Human Environment Animal Protection Party	4,437	0.4	0	–	–	–	0	0
Others & Independents	3,344	0.3	0	–	–	–	0	–
Invalid/blank votes	21,741	–	–	19,433	–	–	–	–
Total	1,198,248	100	9	1,198,248	100	10	19	+2
Registered voters/turnout	1,930,880	62.1	–	1,930,880	62.1	–	–	–
Source: Federal Returning Officer

Constituency members
#	Constituency	Previous member	Elected member	Party	Votes	%	Margin	Runner-up
66	Altmark	Katrin Kunert	Jörg Hellmuth	CDU	44,686	42.1	12,522	Katrin Kunert
67	Börde – Jerichower Land	Manfred Behrens	Manfred Behrens	CDU	61,890	44.6	29,772	Waltraud Wolff
68	Harz	Heike Brehmer	Heike Brehmer	CDU	59,779	46.0	29,919	Elke Reinke
69	Magdeburg	Rosemarie Hein	Tino Sorge	CDU	55,046	36.3	16,815	Rosemarie Hein
70	Dessau – Wittenberg	Ulrich Petzold	Ulrich Petzold	CDU	53,048	44.6	27,033	Jörg Schindler
71	Anhalt	Jan Korte	Kees de Vries	CDU	56,514	41.0	16,799	Jan Korte
72	Halle	Petra Sitte	Christoph Bergner	CDU	51,206	36.3	15,200	Petra Sitte
73	Burgenland – Saalekreis	Dieter Stier	Dieter Stier	CDU	54,544	44.8	23,244	Roland Claus
74	Mansfeld	Harald Koch	Uda Heller	CDU	54,705	41.9	18,723	Harald Koch

List members
LINKE	SPD	GRÜNE
Roland Claus; Rosemarie Hein; Jan Korte; Katrin Kunert; Petra Sitte	Karamba Diaby; Marina Kermer; Burkhard Lischka; Waltraud Wolff	Steffi Lemke

=== Berlin ===
Party	Constituency			Party list			Total seats	+/–
Party	Votes	%	Seats	Votes	%	Seats	Total seats	+/–
Christian Democratic Union (CDU)	536,332	30.0	5	508,643	28.5	4	9	+3
Social Democratic Party (SPD)	455,138	25.5	2	439,387	24.6	6	8	+3
The Left (DIE LINKE)	333,148	18.7	4	330,507	18.5	2	6	+1
Alliance 90/The Greens (GRÜNE)	243,259	13.6	1	220,737	12.3	3	4	0
Alternative for Germany (AfD)	67,483	3.8	0	88,060	4.9	0	0	New
Pirate Party Germany	56,911	3.2	0	64,018	3.6	0	0	0
Free Democratic Party (FDP)	25,867	1.4	0	63,616	3.6	0	0	−3
National Democratic Party	30,041	1.7	0	27,014	1.5	0	0	0
Die PARTEI	16,057	0.9	0	18,673	1.0	0	0	New
Free Voters	8,138	0.5	0	7,531	0.4	0	0	New
Pro Germany Citizens' Movement	1,101	0.1	0	5,665	0.3	0	0	New
Ecological Democratic Party	–	–	–	3,612	0.2	0	0	0
Alliance for Innovation & Justice	2,428	0.1	0	3,509	0.2	0	0	New
The Republicans	–	–	–	2,564	0.1	0	0	0
Civil Rights Movement Solidarity	2,637	0.1	0	1,810	0.1	0	0	0
Marxist–Leninist Party	618	0.0	0	1,410	0.1	0	0	0
Socialist Equality Party	–	–	–	965	0.1	0	0	0
Bergpartei, die "ÜberPartei"	624	0.0	0	–	–	–	0	New
The Violets	457	0.0	0	–	–	–	0	0
German Communist Party	261	0.0	0	–	–	–	0	0
Alliance 21/RRP	84	0.0	0	–	–	–	0	0
Others & Independents	5,176	0.3	0	–	–	–	0	–
Invalid/blank votes	29,655	–	–	27,694	–	–	–	–
Total	1,815,415	100	12	1,815,415	100	15	27	+4
Registered voters/turnout	2,505,718	72.5	–	2,505,718	72.5	–	–	–
Source: Federal Returning Officer

Constituency members
#	Constituency	Previous member	Elected member	Party	Votes	%	Margin	Runner-up
75	Berlin-Mitte	Eva Högl	Eva Högl	SPD	39,360	28.3	6,095	Philipp Lengsfeld
76	Berlin-Pankow	Stefan Liebich	Stefan Liebich	LINKE	48,926	28.3	7,631	Lars Zimmermann
77	Berlin-Reinickendorf	Frank Steffel	Frank Steffel	CDU	58,845	45.0	20,252	Jörg Stroedter
78	Berlin-Spandau – Charlottenburg North	Kai Wegner	Kai Wegner	CDU	50,071	39.2	2,281	Swen Schulz
79	Berlin-Steglitz-Zehlendorf	Karl-Georg Wellmann	Karl-Georg Wellmann	CDU	73,460	42.5	22,920	Ute Finckh-Krämer
80	Berlin-Charlottenburg-Wilmersdorf	Petra-Evelyne Merkel	Klaus-Dieter Gröhler	CDU	56,079	37.1	8,460	Ülker Radziwill
81	Berlin-Tempelhof-Schöneberg	Jan-Marco Luczak	Jan-Marco Luczak	CDU	60,926	35.0	15,267	Mechthild Rawert
82	Berlin-Neukölln	Stefanie Vogelsang	Fritz Felgentreu	SPD	44,528	32.3	2,436	Christina Schwarzer
83	Berlin-Friedrichshain-Kreuzberg – Prenzlauer Berg East	Hans-Christian Ströbele	Hans-Christian Ströbele	GRÜNE	66,056	39.9	36,257	Cansel Kiziltepe
84	Berlin-Treptow-Köpenick	Gregor Gysi	Gregor Gysi	LINKE	61,661	42.2	28,625	Fritz Niedergesäß
85	Berlin-Marzahn-Hellersdorf	Petra Pau	Petra Pau	LINKE	50,866	38.9	17,314	Monika Grütters
86	Berlin-Lichtenberg	Gesine Lötzsch	Gesine Lötzsch	LINKE	54,932	40.3	23,944	Martin Pätzold

List members
SPD	CDU	GRÜNE	LINKE
Ute Finckh-Krämer; Cansel Kiziltepe; Klaus Mindrup; Mechthild Rawert; Matthias Schmidt; Swen Schulz	Monika Grütters; Philipp Lengsfeld; Martin Pätzold; Christina Schwarzer	Renate Künast; Özcan Mutlu; Lisa Paus	Azize Tank; Halina Wawzyniak

=== North Rhine-Westphalia ===
Party	Constituency			Party list			Total seats	+/–
Party	Votes	%	Seats	Votes	%	Seats	Total seats	+/–
Christian Democratic Union (CDU)	4,148,811	43.8	37	3,776,563	39.8	26	63	+18
Social Democratic Party (SPD)	3,472,520	36.7	27	3,028,282	31.9	25	52	+13
Alliance 90/The Greens (GRÜNE)	606,235	6.4	0	760,642	8.0	13	13	−1
The Left (DIE LINKE)	483,918	5.1	0	582,925	6.1	10	10	−1
Free Democratic Party (FDP)	228,962	2.4	0	498,027	5.2	0	0	−20
Alternative for Germany (AfD)	171,511	1.8	0	372,258	3.9	0	0	New
Pirate Party Germany	220,636	2.3	0	209,507	2.2	0	0	0
National Democratic Party	95,784	1.0	0	94,291	1.0	0	0	0
Die PARTEI	5,192	0.1	0	37,776	0.4	0	0	New
Free Voters	18,250	0.2	0	25,127	0.3	0	0	New
Pro Germany Citizens' Movement	–	–	–	23,243	0.2	0	0	New
Democracy by Referendum	1,748	0.0	0	17,622	0.2	0	0	0
The Republicans	2,683	0.0	0	13,848	0.1	0	0	0
Ecological Democratic Party	2,431	0.0	0	12,978	0.1	0	0	0
Nichtwähler	–	–	–	11,349	0.1	0	0	New
Alliance for Innovation & Justice	–	–	–	10,705	0.1	0	0	New
Party of Reason	–	–	–	6,888	0.1	0	0	New
Alliance 21/RRP	1,550	0.0	0	5,151	0.1	0	0	0
Marxist–Leninist Party	4,599	0.0	0	4,600	0.0	0	0	0
The Right	–	–	–	2,245	0.0	0	0	New
Socialist Equality Party	–	–	–	2,155	0.0	0	0	0
Civil Rights Movement Solidarity	1,377	0.0	0	1,975	0.0	0	0	0
Family Party	461	0.0	0	–	–	–	0	0
Others & Independents	5,925	0.1	0	–	–	–	0	–
Invalid/blank votes	132,654	–	–	107,090	–	–	–	–
Total	9,605,247	100	64	9,605,247	100	74	138	+9
Registered voters/turnout	13,253,554	72.5	–	13,253,554	72.5	–	–	–
Source: Federal Returning Officer

Constituency members
#	Constituency	Previous member	Elected member	Party	Votes	%	Margin	Runner-up
87	Aachen I	Rudolf Henke	Rudolf Henke	CDU	54,175	40.7	7,268	Ulla Schmidt
88	Aachen II	Helmut Brandt	Helmut Brandt	CDU	73,621	45.6	15,986	Hans Detlef Loosz
89	Heinsberg	Leo Dautzenberg	Wilfried Oellers	CDU	70,649	53.4	33,205	Norbert Spinrath
90	Düren	Thomas Rachel	Thomas Rachel	CDU	71,903	50.4	23,054	Dietmar Nietan
91	Rhein-Erft-Kreis I	Willi Zylajew	Georg Kippels	CDU	83,598	47.3	19,922	Dierk Timm
92	Euskirchen – Rhein-Erft-Kreis II	Detlef Seif	Detlef Seif	CDU	88,759	50.9	35,056	Helga Kühn-Mengel
93	Cologne I	Martin Dörmann	Martin Dörmann	SPD	48,632	37.0	400	Karsten Möring
94	Cologne II	Michael Paul	Heribert Hirte	CDU	73,011	40.0	13,036	Elfi Scho-Antwerpes
95	Cologne III	Rolf Mützenich	Rolf Mützenich	SPD	55,021	39.3	9,022	Gisela Manderla
96	Bonn	Ulrich Kelber	Ulrich Kelber	SPD	65,955	38.2	1,177	Claudia Lücking-Michel
97	Rhein-Sieg-Kreis I	Elisabeth Winkelmeier-Becker	Elisabeth Winkelmeier-Becker	CDU	84,556	49.6	34,285	Sebastian Hartmann
98	Rhein-Sieg-Kreis II	Norbert Röttgen	Norbert Röttgen	CDU	85,058	52.4	40,960	Bettina Bähr-Losse
99	Oberbergischer Kreis	Klaus-Peter Flosbach	Klaus-Peter Flosbach	CDU	77,800	52.2	22,037	Michaela Engelmeier
100	Rheinisch-Bergischer Kreis	Wolfgang Bosbach	Wolfgang Bosbach	CDU	98,017	58.5	56,123	Michael Zalfen
101	Leverkusen – Cologne IV	Karl Lauterbach	Karl Lauterbach	SPD	61,172	41.3	2,971	Helmut Nowak
102	Wuppertal I	Manfred Zöllmer	Manfred Zöllmer	SPD	58,407	40.7	5,980	Peter Hintze
103	Solingen – Remscheid – Wuppertal II	Jürgen Hardt	Jürgen Hardt	CDU	70,269	44.3	17,338	Sven Wiertz
104	Mettmann I	Michaela Noll	Michaela Noll	CDU	75,628	49.5	22,796	Peer Steinbrück
105	Mettmann II	Peter Beyer	Peter Beyer	CDU	55,307	45.6	10,216	Kerstin Griese
106	Düsseldorf I	Thomas Jarzombek	Thomas Jarzombek	CDU	78,206	47.9	30,475	Philipp Tacer
107	Düsseldorf II	Beatrix Philipp	Sylvia Pantel	CDU	55,990	40.7	7,925	Andreas Rimkus
108	Neuss I	Hermann Gröhe	Hermann Gröhe	CDU	78,712	51.6	32,093	Klaus Krützen
109	Mönchengladbach	Günter Krings	Günter Krings	CDU	63,843	50.8	27,178	Gülistan Yüksel
110	Krefeld I – Neuss II	Ansgar Heveling	Ansgar Heveling	CDU	73,201	49.1	27,053	Benedikt Winzen
111	Viersen	Uwe Schummer	Uwe Schummer	CDU	87,764	53.0	40,566	Udo Schiefner
112	Kleve	Ronald Pofalla	Ronald Pofalla	CDU	81,216	50.9	28,438	Barbara Hendricks
113	Wesel I	Sabine Weiss	Sabine Weiss	CDU	66,172	43.5	6,463	Hans-Ulrich Krüger
114	Krefeld II – Wesel II	Siegmund Ehrmann	Siegmund Ehrmann	SPD	53,578	41.5	1,743	Kerstin Radomski
115	Duisburg I	Bärbel Bas	Bärbel Bas	SPD	55,779	46.6	17,302	Thomas Mahlberg
116	Duisburg II	Johannes Pflug	Mahmut Özdemir	SPD	44,759	43.2	14,105	Volker Mosblech
117	Oberhausen – Wesel III	Michael Groschek	Dirk Vöpel	SPD	65,442	45.1	18,553	Marie-Luise Dött
118	Mülheim – Essen I	Anton Schaaf	Arno Klare	SPD	58,741	42.2	9,254	Astrid Timmermann-Fechter
119	Essen II	Rolf Hempelmann	Dirk Heidenblut	SPD	51,677	48.3	18,434	Jutta Eckenbach
120	Essen III	Petra Hinz	Matthias Hauer	CDU	59,101	39.5	93	Petra Hinz
121	Recklinghausen I	Frank Schwabe	Frank Schwabe	SPD	54,504	45.2	13,121	Philipp Mißfelder
122	Recklinghausen II	Michael Groß	Michael Groß	SPD	61,748	45.7	12,344	Rita Stockhofe
123	Gelsenkirchen	Joachim Poß	Joachim Poß	SPD	58,967	50.5	25,507	Oliver Wittke
124	Steinfurt I – Borken I	Jens Spahn	Jens Spahn	CDU	75,853	52.0	29,394	Ingrid Arndt-Brauer
125	Bottrop – Recklinghausen III	Michael Gerdes	Michael Gerdes	SPD	66,913	45.8	13,559	Sven Volmering
126	Borken II	Johannes Röring	Johannes Röring	CDU	86,028	57.4	45,385	Ursula Schulte
127	Coesfeld – Steinfurt II	Karl Schiewerling	Karl Schiewerling	CDU	83,175	56.1	43,453	Ulrich Hampel
128	Steinfurt III	Dieter Jasper	Anja Karliczek	CDU	69,385	47.9	16,599	Jürgen Coße
129	Münster	Ruprecht Polenz	Sybille Benning	CDU	69,352	38.8	6,056	Christoph Strässer
130	Warendorf	Reinhold Sendker	Reinhold Sendker	CDU	80,272	51.3	30,216	Bernhard Daldrup
131	Gütersloh I	Ralph Brinkhaus	Ralph Brinkhaus	CDU	83,869	50.3	27,838	Thorsten Klute
132	Bielefeld – Gütersloh II	Lena Strothmann	Christina Kampmann	SPD	67,464	38.1	1,443	Lena Strothmann
133	Herford – Minden-Lübbecke II	Stefan Schwartze	Stefan Schwartze	SPD	66,637	41.3	764	Tim Ostermann
134	Minden-Lübbecke I	Steffen Kampeter	Steffen Kampeter	CDU	66,385	46.3	8,199	Achim Post
135	Lippe I	Dirk Becker	Dirk Becker	SPD	50,934	41.1	1,151	Cajus Julius Caesar
136	Höxter – Lippe II	Jürgen Herrmann	Christian Haase	CDU	76,882	50.0	28,723	Petra Rode-Bosse
137	Paderborn – Gütersloh III	Carsten Linnemann	Carsten Linnemann	CDU	102,867	59.1	62,438	Burkhard Blienert
138	Hagen – Ennepe-Ruhr-Kreis I	René Röspel	René Röspel	SPD	68,044	47.1	18,715	Cemile Giousouf
139	Ennepe-Ruhr-Kreis II	Christel Humme	Ralf Kapschack	SPD	56,197	42.3	8,667	Ralf Brauksiepe
140	Bochum I	Axel Schäfer	Axel Schäfer	SPD	66,851	44.2	12,990	Norbert Lammert
141	Herne – Bochum II	Gerd Bollmann	Michelle Müntefering	SPD	60,610	48.7	22,803	Ingrid Fischbach
142	Dortmund I	Marco Bülow	Marco Bülow	SPD	67,019	45.4	21,709	Thorsten Hoffmann
143	Dortmund II	Ulla Burchardt	Sabine Poschmann	SPD	63,388	46.7	19,700	Steffen Kanitz
144	Unna I	Oliver Kaczmarek	Oliver Kaczmarek	SPD	68,287	46.7	15,854	Hubert Hüppe
145	Hamm – Unna II	Dieter Wiefelspütz	Michael Thews	SPD	71,174	43.2	6,303	Sylvia Jörrißen
146	Soest	Bernhard Schulte-Drüggelte	Bernhard Schulte-Drüggelte	CDU	82,394	49.8	27,267	Wolfgang Hellmich
147	Hochsauerlandkreis	Patrick Sensburg	Patrick Sensburg	CDU	83,952	56.1	39,270	Dirk Wiese
148	Siegen-Wittgenstein	Volkmar Klein	Volkmar Klein	CDU	70,833	45.8	14,323	Willi Brase
149	Olpe – Märkischer Kreis I	Matthias Heider	Matthias Heider	CDU	76,911	51.7	28,200	Petra Crone
150	Märkischer Kreis II	Dagmar Freitag	Dagmar Freitag	SPD	59,821	41.7	53	Christel Voßbeck-Kayser

List members
CDU	SPD	GRÜNE	LINKE
Ralf Brauksiepe; Cajus Julius Caesar; Marie-Luise Dött; Jutta Eckenbach; Ingrid Fischbach; Cemile Giousouf; Peter Hintze; Hubert Hüppe; Sylvia Jörrißen; Steffen Kanitz; Norbert Lammert; Claudia Lücking-Michel; Thomas Mahlberg; Gisela Manderla; Philipp Mißfelder; Karsten Möring; Helmut Nowak; Tim Ostermann; Kerstin Radomski; Rita Stockhofe; Lena Strothmann; Astrid Timmermann-Fechter; Sven Volmering; Christel Voßbeck-Kayser; Oliver Wittke; Heinrich Zertik	Ingrid Arndt-Brauer; Burkhard Blienert; Willi Brase; Petra Crone; Bernhard Daldrup; Michaela Engelmeier-Heite; Kerstin Griese; Ulrich Hampel; Sebastian Hartmann; Wolfgang Hellmich; Barbara Hendricks; Petra Hinz; Hans-Ulrich Krüger; Helga Kühn-Mengel; Dietmar Nietan; Achim Post; Andreas Rimkus; Udo Schiefner; Ulla Schmidt; Ursula Schulte; Norbert Spinrath; Peer Steinbrück; Christoph Strässer; Dirk Wiese; Gülistan Yüksel	Volker Beck; Katja Dörner; Katharina Dröge; Kai Gehring; Britta Haßelmann; Bärbel Höhn; Maria Klein-Schmeink; Oliver Krischer; Markus Kurth; Irene Mihalic; Friedrich Ostendorff; Ulle Schauws; Frithjof Schmidt	Matthias Birkwald; Sevim Dağdelen; Inge Höger; Andrej Hunko; Ulla Jelpke; Niema Movassat; Alexander Neu; Kathrin Vogler; Sahra Wagenknecht; Hubertus Zdebel

=== Saxony ===
Party	Constituency			Party list			Total seats	+/–
Party	Votes	%	Seats	Votes	%	Seats	Total seats	+/–
Christian Democratic Union (CDU)	1,080,087	46.5	16	994,601	42.6	1	17	+1
The Left (DIE LINKE)	500,300	21.5	0	467,045	20.0	8	8	0
Social Democratic Party (SPD)	375,941	16.2	0	340,819	14.6	6	6	+1
Alternative for Germany (AfD)	–	–	–	157,781	6.8	0	0	New
Alliance 90/The Greens (GRÜNE)	103,470	4.5	0	113,916	4.9	2	2	0
National Democratic Party	99,553	4.3	0	76,436	3.3	0	0	0
Free Democratic Party (FDP)	55,673	2.4	0	71,259	3.1	0	0	−4
Pirate Party Germany	57,250	2.5	0	58,561	2.5	0	0	0
Free Voters	27,254	1.2	0	34,858	1.5	0	0	New
Pro Germany Citizens' Movement	2,979	0.1	0	9,736	0.4	0	0	New
Civil Rights Movement Solidarity	11,274	0.5	0	5,076	0.2	0	0	0
Marxist–Leninist Party	554	0.0	0	2,564	0.1	0	0	0
Die PARTEI	3,852	0.2	0	–	–	–	0	New
Alliance for Greater Germany	1,431	0.1	0	–	–	–	0	New
Others & Independents	5,275	0.2	0	–	–	–	0	–
Invalid/blank votes	43,865	–	–	36,106	–	–	–	–
Total	2,368,758	100	16	2,368,758	100	17	33	−2
Registered voters/turnout	3,406,430	69.5	–	3,406,430	69.5	–	–	–
Source: Federal Returning Officer

Constituency members
#	Constituency	Previous member	Elected member	Party	Votes	%	Margin	Runner-up
151	Nordsachsen	Manfred Kolbe	Marian Wendt	CDU	49,906	45.6	26,063	Susanna Karawanskij
152	Leipzig I	Bettina Kudla	Bettina Kudla	CDU	54,566	40.0	22,643	Barbara Höll
153	Leipzig II	Thomas Feist	Thomas Feist	CDU	52,077	34.3	14,327	Mike Nagler
154	Leipzig-Land	Katharina Landgraf	Katharina Landgraf	CDU	76,273	51.3	44,408	Axel Troost
155	Meißen	Thomas de Maizière	Thomas de Maizière	CDU	76,666	53.6	51,387	Sebastian Scheel
156	Bautzen I	Maria Michalk	Maria Michalk	CDU	74,794	49.2	42,342	Caren Lay
157	Görlitz	Michael Kretschmer	Michael Kretschmer	CDU	74,204	49.6	44,654	Ilya Seifert
158	Sächsische Schweiz-Osterzgebirge	Klaus Brähmig	Klaus Brähmig	CDU	72,644	50.2	45,073	André Hahn
159	Dresden I	Andreas Lämmel	Andreas Lämmel	CDU	72,537	42.6	29,938	Katja Kipping
160	Dresden II – Bautzen II	Arnold Vaatz	Arnold Vaatz	CDU	71,227	41.8	38,639	Tilo Kießling
161	Mittelsachsen	Veronika Bellmann	Veronika Bellmann	CDU	74,209	51.9	45,130	Lothar Schmidt
162	Chemnitz	Frank Heinrich	Frank Heinrich	CDU	55,909	41.7	23,917	Michael Leutert
163	Chemnitzer Umland – Erzgebirgskreis II	Marco Wanderwitz	Marco Wanderwitz	CDU	65,157	49.6	36,374	Jörn Wunderlich
164	Erzgebirgskreis I	Günter Baumann	Günter Baumann	CDU	79,318	50.2	36,846	Andrea Schrutek
165	Zwickau	Michael Luther	Carsten Körber	CDU	64,857	44.6	29,010	Sabine Zimmermann
166	Vogtlandkreis	Robert Hochbaum	Robert Hochbaum	CDU	65,743	48.3	37,571	Benjamin Zabel

List members
LINKE	SPD	GRÜNE	CDU
André Hahn; Susanna Karawanskij; Katja Kipping; Caren Lay; Michael Leutert; Axel Troost; Jörn Wunderlich; Sabine Zimmermann	Wolfgang Gunkel; Thomas Jurk; Daniela Kolbe; Simone Raatz; Susann Rüthrich; Wolfgang Tiefensee	Stephan Kühn; Monika Lazar	Yvonne Magwas

=== Hesse ===
Party	Constituency			Party list			Total seats	+/–
Party	Votes	%	Seats	Votes	%	Seats	Total seats	+/–
Christian Democratic Union (CDU)	1,399,206	44.5	17	1,232,994	39.2	4	21	+6
Social Democratic Party (SPD)	1,080,828	34.4	5	906,906	28.8	11	16	+4
Alliance 90/The Greens (GRÜNE)	236,653	7.5	0	313,135	9.9	5	5	−1
The Left (DIE LINKE)	167,135	5.3	0	188,654	6.0	3	3	−1
Alternative for Germany (AfD)	37,910	1.2	0	176,319	5.6	0	0	New
Free Democratic Party (FDP)	81,708	2.6	0	175,144	5.6	0	0	−8
Pirate Party Germany	74,084	2.4	0	64,655	2.1	0	0	0
National Democratic Party	38,635	1.2	0	34,115	1.1	0	0	0
Free Voters	11,727	0.4	0	24,929	0.8	0	0	New
Die PARTEI	3,869	0.1	0	15,033	0.5	0	0	New
The Republicans	1,239	0.0	0	8,402	0.3	0	0	0
Pro Germany Citizens' Movement	–	–	–	3,754	0.1	0	0	New
Civil Rights Movement Solidarity	613	0.0	0	1,536	0.0	0	0	0
Socialist Equality Party	–	–	–	1,444	0.0	0	0	0
Marxist–Leninist Party	325	0.0	0	1,071	0.0	0	0	0
Others & Independents	7,337	0.2	0	–	–	–	0	–
Invalid/blank votes	89,214	–	–	82,392	–	–	–	–
Total	3,230,483	100	22	3,230,483	100	23	45	0
Registered voters/turnout	4,413,271	73.2	–	4,413,271	73.2	–	–	–
Source: Federal Returning Officer

Constituency members
#	Constituency	Previous member	Elected member	Party	Votes	%	Margin	Runner-up
167	Waldeck	Ullrich Meßmer	Thomas Viesehon	CDU	55,444	41.5	227	Ullrich Meßmer
168	Kassel	Ulrike Gottschalck	Ulrike Gottschalck	SPD	62,178	40.0	7,504	Norbert Wett
169	Werra-Meißner – Hersfeld-Rotenburg	Michael Roth	Michael Roth	SPD	54,630	43.1	3,244	Helmut Heiderich
170	Schwalm-Eder	Edgar Franke	Edgar Franke	SPD	57,944	42.3	3,782	Bernd Siebert
171	Marburg	Sören Bartol	Sören Bartol	SPD	55,982	43.7	5,299	Stefan Heck
172	Lahn-Dill	Sibylle Pfeiffer	Sibylle Pfeiffer	CDU	68,666	48.1	19,453	Dagmar Schmidt
173	Gießen	Helge Braun	Helge Braun	CDU	67,587	44.4	13,559	Rüdiger Veit
174	Fulda	Michael Brand	Michael Brand	CDU	87,263	58.3	49,911	Birgit Kömpel
175	Main-Kinzig – Wetterau II – Schotten	New seat	Peter Tauber	CDU	61,911	48.8	20,850	Bettina Müller
176	Hochtaunus	Holger Haibach	Markus Koob	CDU	66,785	48.8	28,350	Hans-Joachim Schabedoth
177	Wetterau I	Lucia Puttrich	Oswin Veith	CDU	60,118	47.1	19,313	Stefan Lux
178	Rheingau-Taunus – Limburg	Klaus-Peter Willsch	Klaus-Peter Willsch	CDU	84,489	52.1	37,337	Martin Rabanus
179	Wiesbaden	Kristina Schröder	Kristina Schröder	CDU	56,466	43.6	11,155	Simon Rottloff
180	Hanau	Peter Tauber	Katja Leikert	CDU	54,920	44.3	9,736	Sascha Raabe
181	Main-Taunus	Heinz Riesenhuber	Heinz Riesenhuber	CDU	79,353	52.5	38,426	Dieter Falk
182	Frankfurt am Main I	Matthias Zimmer	Matthias Zimmer	CDU	52,427	40.2	9,303	Gregor Amann
183	Frankfurt am Main II	Erika Steinbach	Erika Steinbach	CDU	57,004	36.3	9,150	Ulli Nissen
184	Groß-Gerau	Franz Josef Jung	Franz Josef Jung	CDU	52,087	42.2	5,145	Gerold Reichenbach
185	Offenbach	Peter Wichtel	Peter Wichtel	CDU	69,930	45.5	21,946	Dirk Gene Hagelstein
186	Darmstadt	Brigitte Zypries	Brigitte Zypries	SPD	65,820	37.3	2,423	Charles M. Huber
187	Odenwald	Patricia Lips	Patricia Lips	CDU	80,323	46.9	22,737	Jens Zimmermann
188	Bergstraße	Michael Meister	Michael Meister	CDU	70,131	48.3	24,032	Christine Lambrecht

List members
SPD	GRÜNE	CDU	LINKE
Birgit Kömpel; Christine Lambrecht; Bettina Müller; Ulli Nissen; Sascha Raabe; Martin Rabanus; Gerold Reichenbach; Hans-Joachim Schabedoth; Dagmar Schmidt; Rüdiger Veit; Jens Zimmermann	Priska Hinz; Tom Koenigs; Nicole Maisch; Omid Nouripour; Kordula Schulz-Asche	Stefan Heck; Helmut Heiderich; Charles M. Huber; Bernd Siebert	Christine Buchholz; Wolfgang Gehrcke; Sabine Leidig

=== Thuringia ===
Party	Constituency			Party list			Total seats	+/–
Party	Votes	%	Seats	Votes	%	Seats	Total seats	+/–
Christian Democratic Union (CDU)	508,083	41.3	9	477,283	38.8	0	9	+2
The Left (DIE LINKE)	298,821	24.3	0	288,615	23.4	5	5	0
Social Democratic Party (SPD)	236,502	19.2	0	198,714	16.1	3	3	0
Alternative for Germany (AfD)	23,981	2.0	0	76,013	6.2	0	0	New
Alliance 90/The Greens (GRÜNE)	45,926	3.7	0	60,511	4.9	1	1	0
National Democratic Party	46,036	3.7	0	39,107	3.2	0	0	0
Free Democratic Party (FDP)	19,282	1.6	0	32,101	2.6	0	0	−2
Pirate Party Germany	30,780	2.5	0	29,499	2.4	0	0	0
Free Voters	13,874	1.1	0	17,613	1.4	0	0	New
Ecological Democratic Party	3,860	0.3	0	7,900	0.6	0	0	0
The Republicans	–	–	–	2,593	0.2	0	0	0
Marxist–Leninist Party	835	0.1	0	1,744	0.1	0	0	0
Party of Reason	351	0.0	0	–	–	–	0	New
Others & Independents	1,053	0.1	0	–	–	–	0	–
Invalid/blank votes	22,019	–	–	19,710	–	–	–	–
Total	1,251,403	100	9	1,251,403	100	9	18	0
Registered voters/turnout	1,834,259	68.2	–	1,834,259	68.2	–	–	–
Source: Federal Returning Officer

Constituency members
#	Constituency	Previous member	Elected member	Party	Votes	%	Margin	Runner-up
189	Eichsfeld – Nordhausen – Unstrut-Hainich-Kreis I	Manfred Grund	Manfred Grund	CDU	65,784	49.8	39,693	Sigrid Hupach
190	Eisenach – Wartburgkreis – Unstrut-Hainich-Kreis II	Christian Hirte	Christian Hirte	CDU	55,220	43.3	25,000	Anja Müller
191	Kyffhäuserkreis – Sömmerda – Weimarer Land I	Johannes Selle	Johannes Selle	CDU	54,350	43.3	21,111	Kersten Steinke
192	Gotha – Ilm-Kreis	Tankred Schipanski	Tankred Schipanski	CDU	51,861	37.3	17,135	Petra Heß
193	Erfurt – Weimar – Weimarer Land II	Antje Tillmann	Antje Tillmann	CDU	56,992	37.1	20,298	Carsten Schneider
194	Gera – Jena – Saale-Holzland-Kreis	Ralph Lenkert	Albert Weiler	CDU	59,731	36.1	15,074	Ralph Lenkert
195	Greiz – Altenburger Land	Volkmar Vogel	Volkmar Vogel	CDU	51,013	44.9	23,386	Frank Tempel
196	Sonneberg – Saalfeld-Rudolstadt – Saale-Orla-Kreis	Carola Stauche	Carola Stauche	CDU	59,153	41.1	21,245	Knut Korschewsky
197	Suhl – Schmalkalden-Meiningen – Hildburghausen	Jens Petermann	Mark Hauptmann	CDU	53,979	42.0	18,832	Jens Petermann

List members
LINKE	SPD	GRÜNE
Sigrid Hupach; Ralph Lenkert; Martina Renner; Kersten Steinke; Frank Tempel	Iris Gleicke; Steffen-Claudio Lemme; Carsten Schneider	Katrin Göring-Eckardt

=== Rhineland-Palatinate ===
Party	Constituency			Party list			Total seats	+/–
Party	Votes	%	Seats	Votes	%	Seats	Total seats	+/–
Christian Democratic Union (CDU)	1,026,360	46.6	14	958,655	43.3	2	16	+3
Social Democratic Party (SPD)	716,029	32.5	1	608,910	27.5	9	10	+2
Alliance 90/The Greens (GRÜNE)	133,256	6.1	0	169,372	7.6	3	3	0
Free Democratic Party (FDP)	63,585	2.9	0	122,640	5.5	0	0	−5
The Left (DIE LINKE)	105,928	4.8	0	120,338	5.4	2	2	−1
Alternative for Germany (AfD)	6,316	0.3	0	106,414	4.8	0	0	New
Pirate Party Germany	55,870	2.5	0	49,664	2.2	0	0	0
Free Voters	48,110	2.2	0	28,159	1.3	0	0	New
National Democratic Party	25,853	1.2	0	23,980	1.1	0	0	0
The Republicans	5,973	0.3	0	8,545	0.4	0	0	0
Ecological Democratic Party	6,091	0.3	0	6,588	0.3	0	0	0
Party of Reason	2,484	0.1	0	5,922	0.3	0	0	New
Pro Germany Citizens' Movement	–	–	–	4,451	0.2	0	0	New
Marxist–Leninist Party	281	0.0	0	859	0.0	0	0	0
Family Party	2,995	0.1	0	–	–	–	0	0
Die PARTEI	952	0.0	0	–	–	–	0	New
Civil Rights Movement Solidarity	286	0.0	0	–	–	–	0	0
Others & Independents	895	0.0	0	–	–	–	0	–
Invalid/blank votes	50,715	–	–	37,482	–	–	–	–
Total	2,251,979	100	15	2,251,979	100	16	31	−1
Registered voters/turnout	3,092,424	72.8	–	3,092,424	72.8	–	–	–
Source: Federal Returning Officer

Constituency members
#	Constituency	Previous member	Elected member	Party	Votes	%	Margin	Runner-up
198	Neuwied	Erwin Rüddel	Erwin Rüddel	CDU	79,785	46.9	16,332	Sabine Bätzing-Lichtenthäler
199	Ahrweiler	Mechthild Heil	Mechthild Heil	CDU	77,379	55.5	38,308	Andrea Nahles
200	Koblenz	Michael Fuchs	Michael Fuchs	CDU	67,046	48.0	23,952	Detlev Pilger
201	Mosel/Rhein-Hunsrück	Peter Bleser	Peter Bleser	CDU	67,658	53.6	32,512	Anja Bindges
202	Kreuznach	Julia Klöckner	Antje Lezius	CDU	53,324	41.4	4,803	Fritz Rudolf Körper
203	Bitburg	Patrick Schnieder	Patrick Schnieder	CDU	65,252	56.0	34,639	Jens Jenssen
204	Trier	Bernhard Kaster	Bernhard Kaster	CDU	67,281	48.8	24,402	Katarina Barley
205	Montabaur	Joachim Hörster	Andreas Nick	CDU	74,887	49.3	27,790	Gabi Weber
206	Mainz	Ute Granold	Ursula Groden-Kranich	CDU	77,285	40.1	10,116	Michael Hartmann
207	Worms	Klaus Hagemann	Jan Metzler	CDU	61,337	42.0	7,389	Marcus Held
208	Ludwigshafen/Frankenthal	Maria Böhmer	Maria Böhmer	CDU	65,746	43.3	11,743	Doris Barnett
209	Neustadt – Speyer	Norbert Schindler	Norbert Schindler	CDU	77,345	47.9	31,128	Heike-Maria Mrosek-Handwerk
210	Kaiserslautern	Gustav Herzog	Gustav Herzog	SPD	61,253	38.5	2,167	Xaver Jung
211	Pirmasens	Anita Schäfer	Anita Schäfer	CDU	57,201	45.9	17,021	Angelika Glöckner
212	Südpfalz	Thomas Gebhart	Thomas Gebhart	CDU	75,748	48.8	32,363	Thomas Hitschler

List members
SPD	GRÜNE	CDU	LINKE
Katarina Barley; Doris Barnett; Sabine Bätzing-Lichtenthäler; Michael Hartmann; Marcus Held; Thomas Hitschler; Andrea Nahles; Detlev Pilger; Gabi Weber	Tobias Lindner; Tabea Rößner; Corinna Rüffer	Alexander Ulrich; Katrin Werner	Xaver Jung; Johannes Steiniger

=== Bavaria ===
Party	Constituency			Party list			Total seats	+/–
Party	Votes	%	Seats	Votes	%	Seats	Total seats	+/–
Christian Social Union in Bavaria (CSU)	3,544,079	53.9	45	3,243,569	49.3	11	56	+11
Social Democratic Party (SPD)	1,443,710	22.0	0	1,314,009	20.0	22	22	+6
Alliance 90/The Greens (GRÜNE)	505,800	7.7	0	552,818	8.4	9	9	−1
Free Democratic Party (FDP)	183,259	2.8	0	334,158	5.1	0	0	−14
Alternative for Germany (AfD)	146,714	2.2	0	283,570	4.3	0	0	New
The Left (DIE LINKE)	225,218	3.4	0	248,920	3.8	4	4	−2
Free Voters	192,702	2.9	0	180,649	2.7	0	0	New
Pirate Party Germany	131,872	2.0	0	127,934	1.9	0	0	0
Ecological Democratic Party	84,583	1.3	0	68,365	1.0	0	0	0
Bavaria Party	28,430	0.4	0	57,395	0.9	0	0	0
National Democratic Party	59,721	0.9	0	56,737	0.9	0	0	0
Human Environment Animal Protection Party	–	–	–	46,937	0.7	0	0	0
The Republicans	8,235	0.1	0	27,457	0.4	0	0	0
Feminist Party of Germany	–	–	–	12,148	0.2	0	0	New
The Violets	1,087	0.0	0	8,211	0.1	0	0	0
Party of Reason	339	0.0	0	6,840	0.1	0	0	New
Pro Germany Citizens' Movement	735	0.0	0	4,874	0.1	0	0	New
Alliance 21/RRP	2,747	0.0	0	3,032	0.0	0	0	0
Marxist–Leninist Party	448	0.0	0	1,757	0.0	0	0	0
Civil Rights Movement Solidarity	1,519	0.0	0	1,375	0.0	0	0	0
Die PARTEI	2,260	0.0	0	–	–	–	0	New
NO! Idea	290	0.0	0	–	–	–	0	New
Others & Independents	7,555	0.1	0	–	–	–	0	–
Invalid/blank votes	62,423	–	–	52,971	–	–	–	–
Total	6,633,726	100	45	6,633,726	100	46	91	0
Registered voters/turnout	9,472,738	70.0	–	9,472,738	70.0	–	–	–
Source: Federal Returning Officer

Constituency members
#	Constituency	Previous member	Elected member	Party	Votes	%	Margin	Runner-up
213	Altötting	Stephan Mayer	Stephan Mayer	CSU	72,915	65.8	56,994	Annette Heidrich
214	Erding – Ebersberg	Maximilian Lehmer	Andreas Lenz	CSU	78,991	55.4	51,758	Ewald Schurer
215	Freising	Franz Obermeier	Erich Irlstorfer	CSU	81,729	52.9	54,564	Florian Simbeck
216	Fürstenfeldbruck	Gerda Hasselfeldt	Gerda Hasselfeldt	CSU	103,904	55.6	66,329	Michael Schrodi
217	Ingolstadt	Reinhard Brandl	Reinhard Brandl	CSU	106,668	61.5	78,107	Stefan Schieren
218	Munich North	Johannes Singhammer	Johannes Singhammer	CSU	66,930	43.2	18,305	Florian Post
219	Munich East	Herbert Frankenhauser	Wolfgang Stefinger	CSU	74,745	44.6	26,694	Claudia Tausend
220	Munich South	Peter Gauweiler	Peter Gauweiler	CSU	66,513	43.4	22,942	Christian Vorländer
221	Munich West/Centre	Hans-Peter Uhl	Hans-Peter Uhl	CSU	73,661	42.6	24,242	Roland Fischer
222	Munich Land	Florian Hahn	Florian Hahn	CSU	100,176	52.5	61,390	Bela Bach
223	Rosenheim	Daniela Ludwig	Daniela Ludwig	CSU	93,964	58.1	73,735	Abuzar Erdogan
224	Starnberg	Ilse Aigner	Alexander Radwan	CSU	97,383	54.1	65,705	Klaus Barthel
225	Traunstein	Peter Ramsauer	Peter Ramsauer	CSU	87,598	62.6	63,028	Bärbel Kofler
226	Weilheim	Alexander Dobrindt	Alexander Dobrindt	CSU	104,236	57.2	74,220	Angelica Dullinger
227	Deggendorf	Bartholomäus Kalb	Bartholomäus Kalb	CSU	57,145	61.4	42,366	Rita Hagl-Kehl
228	Landshut	Wolfgang Götzer	Florian Oßner	CSU	98,703	58.1	71,166	Harald Unfried
229	Passau	Andreas Scheuer	Andreas Scheuer	CSU	69,428	59.8	46,583	Christian Flisek
230	Rottal-Inn	Max Straubinger	Max Straubinger	CSU	62,748	61.1	46,129	Florian Pronold
231	Straubing	Ernst Hinsken	Alois Rainer	CSU	67,579	61.2	48,179	Johanna Uekermann
232	Amberg	Alois Karl	Alois Karl	CSU	87,248	58.4	55,995	Brigitte Bachmann
233	Regensburg	Peter Aumer	Philipp Lerchenfeld	CSU	82,648	48.5	45,107	Karl Söllner
234	Schwandorf	Karl Holmeier	Karl Holmeier	CSU	80,840	57.7	46,124	Marianne Schieder
235	Weiden	Albert Rupprecht	Albert Rupprecht	CSU	64,930	55.1	39,049	Uli Grötsch
236	Bamberg	Thomas Silberhorn	Thomas Silberhorn	CSU	65,723	52.2	36,929	Andreas Schwarz
237	Bayreuth	Hartmut Koschyk	Hartmut Koschyk	CSU	63,936	55.9	34,592	Anette Kramme
238	Coburg	Hans Michelbach	Hans Michelbach	CSU	55,309	50.1	19,524	Norbert Tessmer
239	Hof	Hans-Peter Friedrich	Hans-Peter Friedrich	CSU	64,888	55.1	31,157	Petra Ernstberger
240	Kulmbach	Karl-Theodor zu Guttenberg	Emmi Zeulner	CSU	68,903	56.9	41,316	Simon Moritz
241	Ansbach	Josef Göppel	Josef Göppel	CSU	87,922	53.3	49,591	Anette Pappler
242	Erlangen	Stefan Müller	Stefan Müller	CSU	65,151	48.5	29,774	Martina Stamm-Fibich
243	Fürth	Christian Schmidt	Christian Schmidt	CSU	86,997	49.2	39,061	Carsten Träger
244	Nuremberg North	Dagmar Wöhrl	Dagmar Wöhrl	CSU	51,829	39.4	10,163	Gabriela Heinrich
245	Nuremberg South	Michael Frieser	Michael Frieser	CSU	53,519	44.4	14,577	Martin Burkert
246	Roth	Marlene Mortler	Marlene Mortler	CSU	84,618	50.6	38,418	Christian Nürnberger
247	Aschaffenburg	Norbert Geis	Andrea Lindholz	CSU	67,591	52.4	35,283	Andreas Parr
248	Bad Kissingen	Dorothee Bär	Dorothee Bär	CSU	88,911	57.9	58,347	Sabine Dittmar
249	Main-Spessart	Wolfgang Zöller	Alexander Hoffmann	CSU	73,001	51.7	40,189	Bernd Rützel
250	Schweinfurt	Michael Glos	Anja Weisgerber	CSU	76,548	54.8	44,358	Ralf Hofmann
251	Würzburg	Paul Lehrieder	Paul Lehrieder	CSU	80,776	48.9	38,640	Homaira Mansury
252	Augsburg-Stadt	Christian Ruck	Volker Ullrich	CSU	58,622	44.4	25,477	Ulrike Bahr
253	Augsburg-Land	Hansjörg Durz	Eduard Oswald	CSU	105,841	60.6	74,962	Bernd Bante
254	Donau-Ries	Ulrich Lange	Ulrich Lange	CSU	78,524	60.6	55,666	Gabriele Fograscher
255	Neu-Ulm	Georg Nüßlein	Georg Nüßlein	CSU	91,961	57.5	62,541	Karl-Heinz Brunner
256	Oberallgäu	Gerd Müller	Gerd Müller	CSU	93,494	60.7	66,772	Katharina Schrader
257	Ostallgäu	Stephan Stracke	Stephan Stracke	CSU	99,333	59.8	74,324	Rolf Spitz

List members
SPD	CSU	GRÜNE	LINKE
Ulrike Bahr; Klaus Barthel; Karl-Heinz Brunner; Martin Burkert; Sabine Dittmar; Petra Ernstberger; Christian Flisek; Gabriele Fograscher; Uli Grötsch; Rita Hagl-Kehl; Gabriela Heinrich; Bärbel Kofler; Anette Kramme; Florian Post; Florian Pronold; Bernd Rützel; Marianne Schieder; Ewald Schurer; Andreas Schwarz; Martina Stamm-Fibich; Claudia Tausend; Carsten Träger	Katrin Albsteiger; Artur Auernhammer; Bernd Fabritius; Astrid Freudenstein; Barbara Lanzinger; Silke Launert; Reiner Meier; Julia Obermeier; Matthäus Strebl; Tobias Zech; Gudrun Zollner	Ekin Deligöz; Thomas Gambke; Anton Hofreiter; Dieter Janecek; Uwe Kekeritz; Claudia Roth; Elisabeth Scharfenberg; Doris Wagner; Beate Walter-Rosenheimer	Eva Bulling-Schröter; Klaus Ernst; Nicole Gohlke; Harald Weinberg

=== Baden-Württemberg ===
Party	Constituency			Party list			Total seats	+/–
Party	Votes	%	Seats	Votes	%	Seats	Total seats	+/–
Christian Democratic Union (CDU)	2,873,905	51.1	38	2,576,606	45.7	5	43	+6
Social Democratic Party (SPD)	1,332,623	23.7	0	1,160,424	20.6	20	20	+5
Alliance 90/The Greens (GRÜNE)	614,298	10.9	0	623,294	11.0	10	10	−1
Free Democratic Party (FDP)	164,210	2.9	0	348,317	6.2	0	0	−15
Alternative for Germany (AfD)	133,727	2.4	0	295,988	5.2	0	0	New
The Left (DIE LINKE)	236,251	4.2	0	272,456	4.8	5	5	−1
Pirate Party Germany	113,966	2.0	0	130,767	2.3	0	0	0
National Democratic Party	66,608	1.2	0	56,302	1.0	0	0	0
Human Environment Animal Protection Party	–	–	–	43,277	0.8	0	0	0
Free Voters	36,305	0.6	0	33,479	0.6	0	0	New
Ecological Democratic Party	30,607	0.5	0	23,704	0.4	0	0	0
The Republicans	8,245	0.1	0	21,847	0.4	0	0	0
Pensioners' Party	–	–	–	14,472	0.3	0	0	0
Party of Bible-abiding Christians	–	–	–	12,878	0.2	0	0	0
Democracy by Referendum	–	–	–	11,032	0.2	0	0	0
Party of Reason	–	–	–	5,069	0.1	0	0	New
Pro Germany Citizens' Movement	–	–	–	4,595	0.1	0	0	New
Alliance for Innovation & Justice	–	–	–	3,529	0.1	0	0	New
Marxist–Leninist Party	2,099	0.0	0	2,941	0.1	0	0	0
Civil Rights Movement Solidarity	282	0.0	0	1,042	0.0	0	0	0
Die PARTEI	1,677	0.0	0	–	–	–	0	New
The Violets	972	0.0	0	–	–	–	0	0
German Communist Party	231	0.0	0	–	–	–	0	0
Others & Independents	11,405	0.2	0	–	–	–	0	–
Invalid/blank votes	84,058	–	–	69,450	–	–	–	–
Total	5,711,469	100	38	5,711,469	100	40	78	−6
Registered voters/turnout	7,689,895	74.3	–	7,689,895	74.3	–	–	–
Source: Federal Returning Officer

Constituency members
#	Constituency	Previous member	Elected member	Party	Votes	%	Margin	Runner-up
258	Stuttgart I	Stefan Kaufmann	Stefan Kaufmann	CDU	63,465	42.0	21,943	Cem Özdemir
259	Stuttgart II	Karin Maag	Karin Maag	CDU	58,222	43.8	23,532	Nicolas Schäfstoß
260	Böblingen	Clemens Binninger	Clemens Binninger	CDU	102,408	54.3	57,732	Joachim Rücker
261	Esslingen	Markus Grübel	Markus Grübel	CDU	65,825	51.3	33,446	Michael Wechsler
262	Nürtingen	Michael Hennrich	Michael Hennrich	CDU	80,710	51.0	40,697	Rainer Arnold
263	Göppingen	Klaus Riegert	Hermann Färber	CDU	64,095	49.0	32,449	Heike Baehrens
264	Waiblingen	Joachim Pfeiffer	Joachim Pfeiffer	CDU	87,082	51.4	48,174	Alexander Bauer
265	Ludwigsburg	Steffen Bilger	Steffen Bilger	CDU	80,935	50.4	46,958	Macit Karaahmetoğlu
266	Neckar-Zaber	Eberhard Gienger	Eberhard Gienger	CDU	92,693	53.2	47,001	Thorsten Majer
267	Heilbronn	Thomas Strobl	Thomas Strobl	CDU	87,777	51.4	41,546	Josip Juratovic
268	Schwäbisch Hall – Hohenlohe	Christian von Stetten	Christian von Stetten	CDU	81,427	52.3	45,699	Annette Sawade
269	Backnang – Schwäbisch Gmünd	Norbert Barthle	Norbert Barthle	CDU	70,748	55.4	39,075	Christian Lange
270	Aalen – Heidenheim	Roderich Kiesewetter	Roderich Kiesewetter	CDU	92,293	57.6	52,829	Claudia Sünder
271	Karlsruhe-Stadt	Ingo Wellenreuther	Ingo Wellenreuther	CDU	58,452	39.5	14,586	Parsa Marvi
272	Karlsruhe-Land	Axel Fischer	Axel Fischer	CDU	83,848	53.3	43,113	Vanessa Rieß
273	Rastatt	Peter Götz	Kai Whittaker	CDU	77,850	53.5	44,368	Gabriele Katzmarek
274	Heidelberg	Karl A. Lamers	Karl A. Lamers	CDU	68,061	40.9	17,211	Lothar Binding
275	Mannheim	Egon Jüttner	Egon Jüttner	CDU	53,819	39.8	10,083	Stefan Rebmann
276	Odenwald – Tauber	Alois Gerig	Alois Gerig	CDU	90,624	59.1	57,928	Dorothee Schlegel
277	Rhein-Neckar	Stephan Harbarth	Stephan Harbarth	CDU	72,271	49.7	34,997	Lars Castellucci
278	Bruchsal – Schwetzingen	Olav Gutting	Olav Gutting	CDU	73,944	51.8	38,692	Daniel Born
279	Pforzheim	Gunther Krichbaum	Gunther Krichbaum	CDU	77,737	49.5	41,678	Katja Mast
280	Calw	Hans-Joachim Fuchtel	Hans-Joachim Fuchtel	CDU	83,514	58.5	54,622	Saskia Esken
281	Freiburg	Gernot Erler	Matern von Marschall	CDU	58,106	34.9	8,102	Gernot Erler
282	Lörrach – Müllheim	Armin Schuster	Armin Schuster	CDU	81,205	50.1	41,303	Thomas Mengel
283	Emmendingen – Lahr	Peter Weiß	Peter Weiß	CDU	78,797	52.3	39,025	Johannes Fechner
284	Offenburg	Wolfgang Schäuble	Wolfgang Schäuble	CDU	80,083	56.1	21,221	Elvira Drobinski-Weiß
285	Rottweil – Tuttlingen	Volker Kauder	Volker Kauder	CDU	81,517	57.8	56,473	Ergun Can
286	Schwarzwald-Baar	Siegfried Kauder	Thorsten Frei	CDU	66,505	56.7	44,294	Jens Löw
287	Konstanz	Andreas Jung	Andreas Jung	CDU	75,524	51.9	47,568	Tobias Volz
288	Waldshut	Thomas Dörflinger	Thomas Dörflinger	CDU	65,009	51.4	29,650	Rita Schwarzelühr-Sutter
289	Reutlingen	Ernst-Reinhard Beck	Michael Donth	CDU	76,870	51.9	47,011	Rebecca Hummel
290	Tübingen	Annette Widmann-Mauz	Annette Widmann-Mauz	CDU	69,354	46.9	39,194	Martin Rosemann
291	Ulm	Annette Schavan	Annette Schavan	CDU	85,984	52.1	46,663	Hilde Mattheis
292	Biberach	Josef Rief	Josef Rief	CDU	70,540	59.0	46,574	Martin Gerster
293	Bodensee	Lothar Riebsamen	Lothar Riebsamen	CDU	68,333	53.9	42,228	Jochen Jehle
294	Ravensburg	Andreas Schockenhoff	Andreas Schockenhoff	CDU	69,312	51.6	42,403	Hannes Munzinger
295	Zollernalb – Sigmaringen	Thomas Bareiß	Thomas Bareiß	CDU	78,966	60.7	55,282	Stella Kirgiane-Efremidis

List members
SPD	GRÜNE	CDU	LINKE
Rainer Arnold; Heike Baehrens; Lothar Binding; Lars Castellucci; Elvira Drobinski-Weiß; Gernot Erler; Saskia Esken; Johannes Fechner; Martin Gerster; Josip Juratovic; Gabriele Katzmarek; Christian Lange; Katja Mast; Hilde Mattheis; Stefan Rebmann; Martin Rosemann; Annette Sawade; Dorothee Schlegel; Rita Schwarzelühr-Sutter; Ute Vogt	Kerstin Andreae; Franziska Brantner; Agnieszka Brugger; Harald Ebner; Matthias Gastel; Sylvia Kotting-Uhl; Christian Kühn; Beate Müller-Gemmeke; Cem Özdemir; Gerhard Schick	~~Peter Hinz~~ (Note: Hinz declined his mandate after the election.); Margaret Horb; Kordula Kovac; Gabriele Schmidt; Nina Warken; Heinz Wiese	Karin Binder; Annette Groth; Heike Hänsel; Richard Pitterle; Michael Schlecht

=== Saarland ===
Party	Constituency			Party list			Total seats	+/–
Party	Votes	%	Seats	Votes	%	Seats	Total seats	+/–
Christian Democratic Union (CDU)	234,133	41.7	4	212,368	37.8	0	4	0
Social Democratic Party (SPD)	199,723	35.5	0	174,592	31.0	3	3	+1
The Left (DIE LINKE)	48,977	8.7	0	56,045	10.0	1	1	−1
Alliance 90/The Greens (GRÜNE)	21,746	3.9	0	31,998	5.7	1	1	0
Alternative for Germany (AfD)	24,912	4.4	0	29,291	5.2	0	0	New
Free Democratic Party (FDP)	8,393	1.5	0	21,506	3.8	0	0	−1
Pirate Party Germany	13,880	2.5	0	14,693	2.6	0	0	0
National Democratic Party	9,231	1.6	0	9,691	1.7	0	0	0
Family Party	–	–	–	7,449	1.3	0	0	0
Free Voters	–	–	–	3,664	0.7	0	0	New
Pro Germany Citizens' Movement	–	–	–	902	0.2	0	0	New
Marxist–Leninist Party	267	0.0	0	361	0.1	0	0	0
Party of Reason	687	0.1	0	–	–	–	0	New
Invalid/blank votes	15,479	–	–	14,868	–	–	–	–
Total	577,428	100	4	577,428	100	5	9	−1
Registered voters/turnout	796,072	72.5	–	796,072	72.5	–	–	–
Source: Federal Returning Officer

Constituency members
#	Constituency	Previous member	Elected member	Party	Votes	%	Margin	Runner-up
296	Saarbrücken	Anette Hübinger	Anette Hübinger	CDU	51,324	36.9	1,038	Elke Ferner
297	Saarlouis	Peter Altmaier	Peter Altmaier	CDU	66,694	44.5	14,391	Reinhold Jost
298	St. Wendel	Nadine Schön	Nadine Schön	CDU	60,865	45.4	15,997	Christian Petry
299	Homburg	Alexander Funk	Alexander Funk	CDU	55,250	39.8	2,984	David Lindemann

List members
SPD	LINKE	GRÜNE
Elke Ferner; Heidtrud Henn; Reinhold Jost	Thomas Lutze	Markus Tressel

== Gallery ==
CDU-CSU vote

SPD vote

Linke vote

Grüne vote

FDP vote

AfD vote

Piraten vote

NPD vote
