= Xaver Jung =

German politician

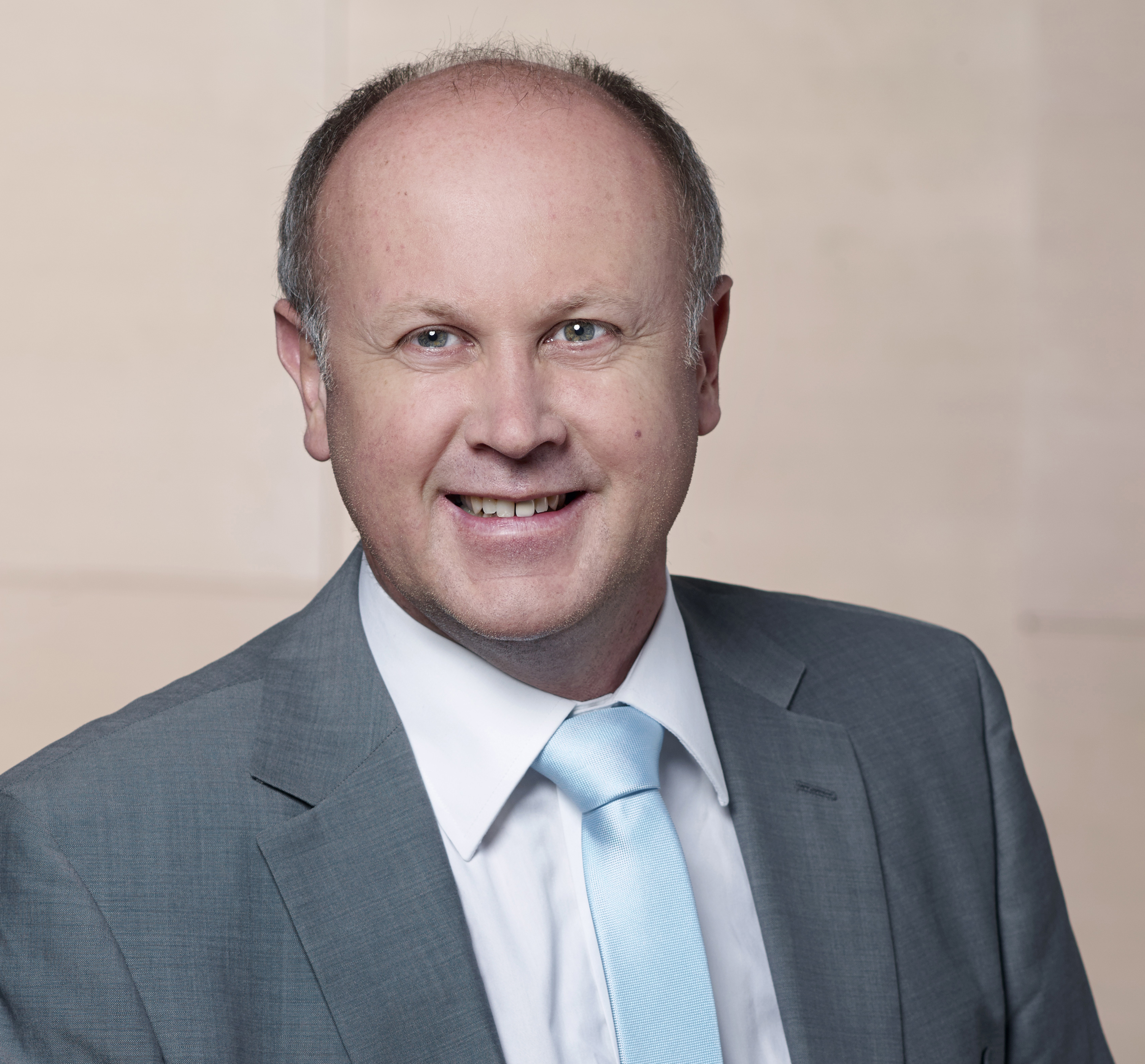
- Xaver Jung (2013)

Member of the Bundestag
- In office 22 October 2013 – 24 October 2017

Personal details
- Born: 23 March 1963 (age 63) Kusel
- Party: CDU
- Children: 2

Xaver Jung (born 23 March 1963) is a German politician of the Christian Democratic Union (CDU) and former member of the German Bundestag.

== Life ==
Jung studied political science at the University of Heidelberg. This was followed by school music studies at the Heidelberg University of Music and the postgraduate course "Artistic Degree in Piano". Jung worked as a teacher and finally as a senior teacher. He was mayor of Rammelsbach and a member of the state committee for education in Rhineland-Palatinate. The CDU Parliamentary Group in the county council of the Kusel district elected him as its chairman.

In the 2013 federal elections, Jung was elected as a member of the German Bundestag via position 13 on the CDU state list for Rhineland-Palatinate. He was also a direct candidate in the Kaiserslautern constituency. As a member of parliament, Jung sat on the Committee for Education, Research and Technology Assessment. As rapporteur, he was responsible for pre-school and general school education, as well as further education. In the 2017 federal elections, Jung missed his return to the Bundestag.
