= Sylvia Jörrißen =

German politician

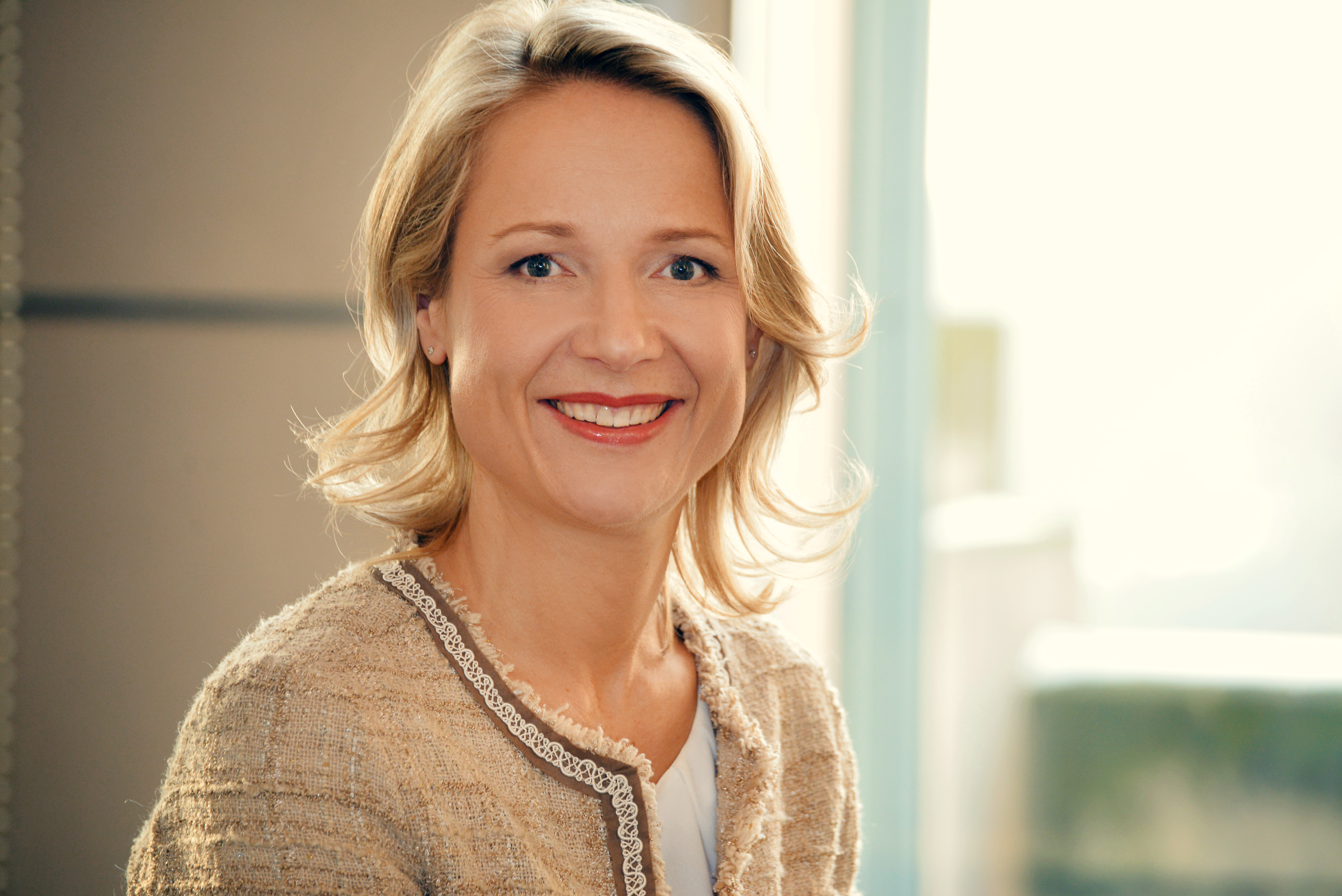
Sylvia Jörrißen

Sylvia Sabine Jörrißen (born 29 November 1967 in Oberhausen, West Germany) is a German politician and a member of the Christian Democratic Union or CDU. In the parliamentary election in 2013 she was elected as a member of the German Bundestag. She is Protestant, married and a mother of three. Professionally Jörrißen is a certified banking specialist.

== Education ==
Between 1974 and 1978 she attended primary school in Meerbusch, Herford and Hamm, between 1978 and 1987 she attended Hammonense academic secondary school in Hamm and obtained Abitur (higher-education entrance qualification). In 1987 she began a two-year training as a bank clerk at the Hamm branch of Deutsche Bank, where she got her diploma as a banking specialist. From 1989 to 1993 she worked in the Deutsche Bank cross-regional support association for loans and business customers in Hamm and Osnabrück, 1991-1992 she studied part-time at Bankakademie in Dortmund whilst working, between 1993 and 1998 she was on maternity leave and had a career break to raise children. Since 2003 she has been working as a freelance real property manager.

== Political career ==
Jörrißen joined the Christian Democratic Union in 2003 and from 2004 to 2013 she was a member of the Hamm-Heessen district council. Since 2004 she has also been a member of the executive committee of the Hamm county branch of Women´s Union; since 2005 a member of the local Heessen branch of the CDU and since 2007 its vice-chairwoman. Between 2008 and 2013 she was a chairwoman of the district council in Heessen and since 2009 a member of the executive committee of the Hamm county branch of the CDU.

== Bundestag ==
In the Bundestag election in 2013 Sylvia Jörrißen competed as a direct member for the constituency 145 Hamm-Unna II, however she entered the German Bundestag via the North Rhine-Westphalia list of state candidates. She is a member of the Committee on the Environment, Building, Nature Conservation and Nuclear Safety and a deputy member of two further committees on Legal Affairs and Consumer Protection Committee and on Transport and Digital Infrastructure.

== Activities ==
Since 2004 she is a member of the association supporting Hammonense academic secondary school; since 2011 she is also a founding member and director of the association supporting Oberwerries Manor.

== Private ==
Sylvia Jörrißen is married with the manager of the construction company HGB in Hamm, Thomas Jörrißen and lives with her family in Hamm-Heessen. Her father, Norwin Wegner, was a city councilor from the Free Democratic Party (FDP) for many years. Jörrißen is a fan of the football club FC Schalke 04.
