= Philipp Lengsfeld =

German politician

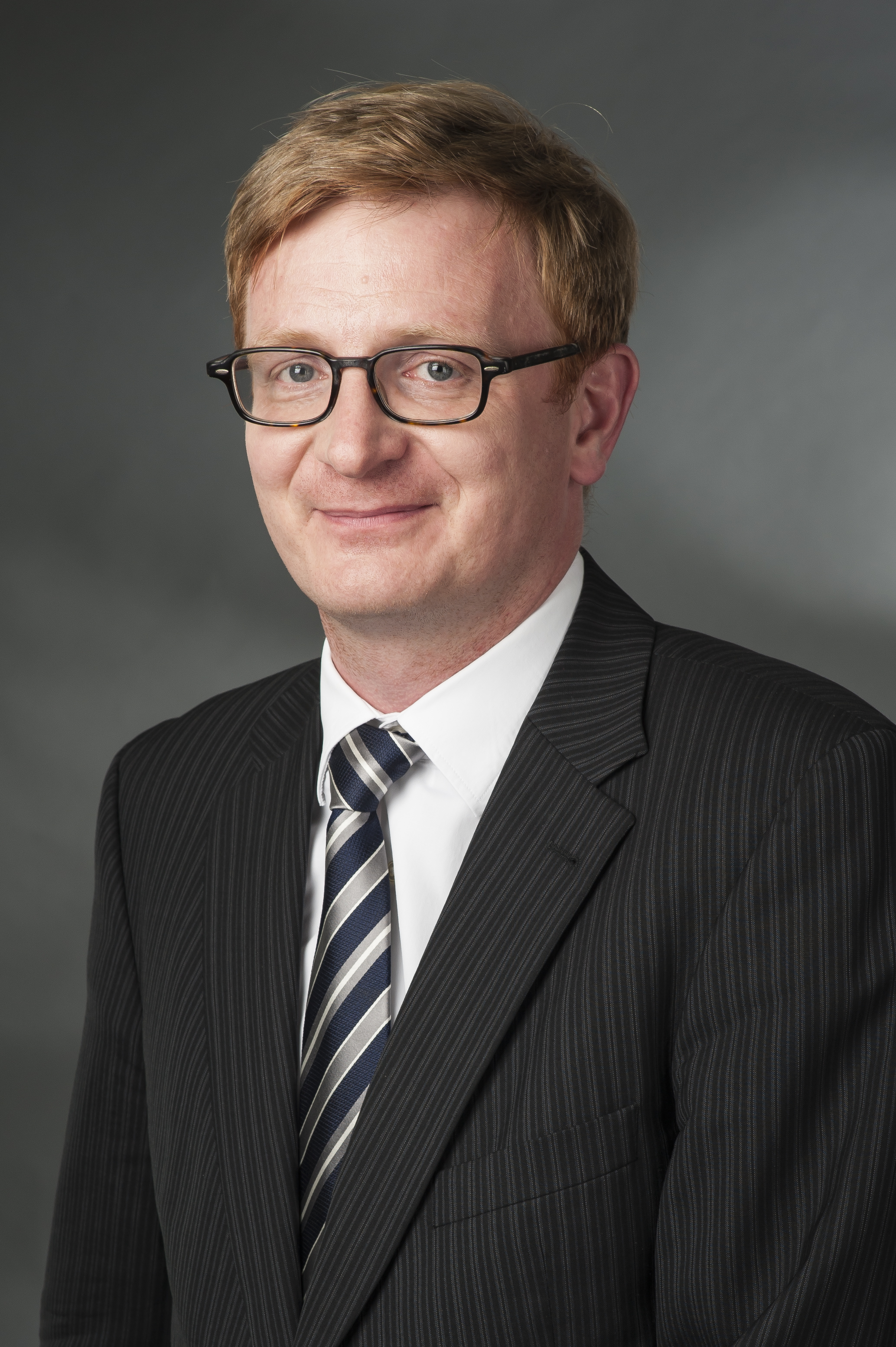

Member of the Bundestag
- In office 22 September 2013 – 24 September 2017
- Constituency: Berlin-Mitte

Personal details
- Born: 21 March 1972 (age 54) East Berlin, East Germany
- Party: Alliance 90/The Greens (1995–2001); Christian Democratic Union (2001–2023)
- Children: 2
- Education: Technische Universität Berlin

Philipp Lengsfeld (born 21 March 1972) is a German politician, formerly of the Christian Democratic Union (CDU).

== Life ==
Born in East Berlin, Lengsfeld is the oldest son of German politician and civil rights activist Vera Lengsfeld. He grew up in East Germany. In 2001, he joined the center-right CDU.

From 2013 to 2017, he was a member of the Bundestag.

He left the CDU in 2023.

== Positions ==
Lengsfeld belonged to the right-wing of his party, the so-called Berliner Kreis.

He opposes same-sex marriage and is critic of Angela Merkels climate policy.
