= Herlind Gundelach =

German politician

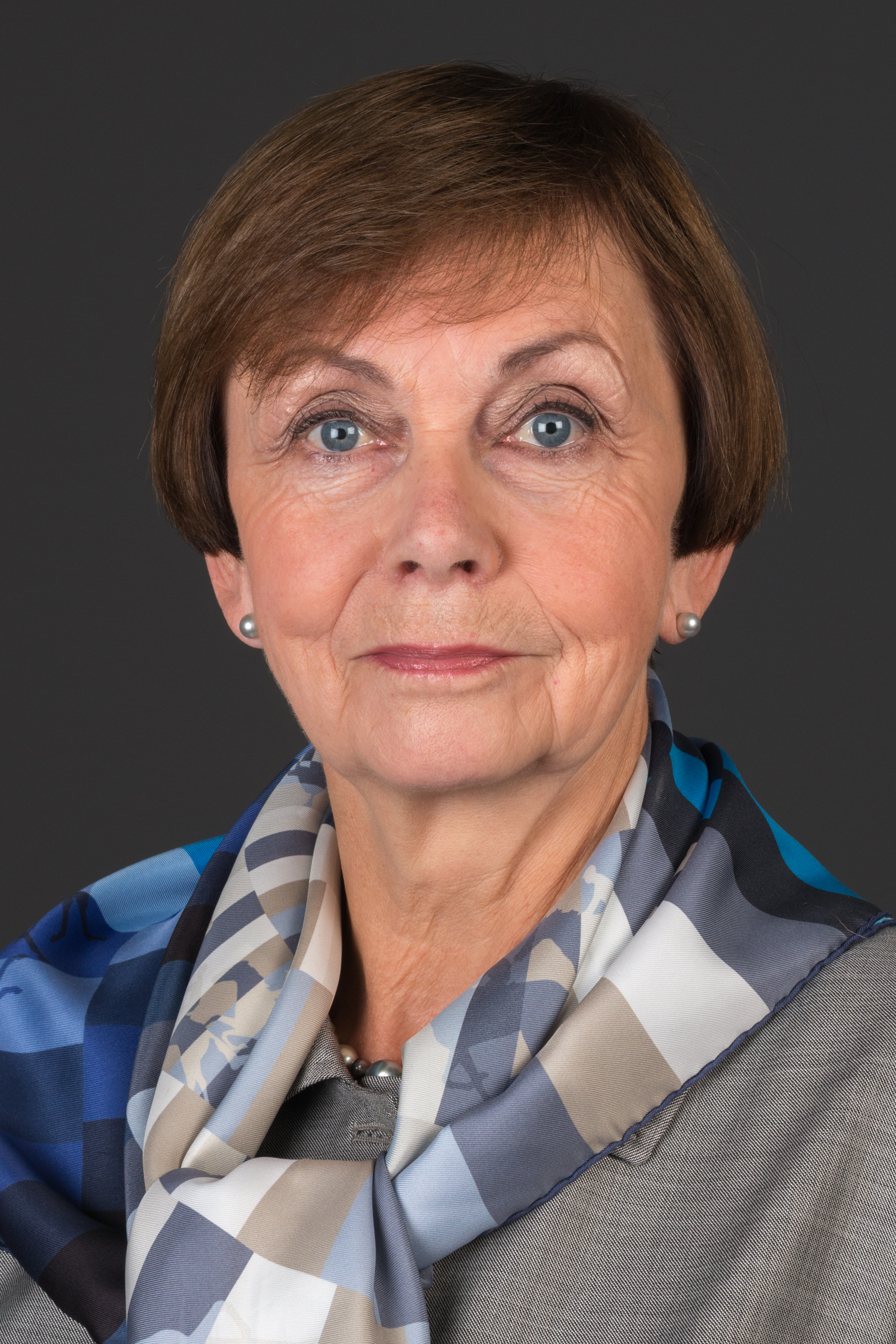
- Gundelach in 2014

Member of the Bundestag
- In office 22 September 2013 – 24 October 2017

Hamburg State Minister for Science and Research
- In office 2008–2011

Personal details
- Born: 28 February 1949 (age 77) Aalen
- Party: CDU

Herlind Gundelach (born 1949) is a German politician of the German Christian Democratic Union.

== Early life and education ==
Gundelach was born on 28 February 1949 in Aalen, she is married and has a daughter. She studied political science, history, philosophy, and constitutional law at the University of Bonn and earned her doctorate (Dr. phil.).

== Career ==
In 2007, Gundelach was appointed to the City of Hamburg's Council on Climate Protection by Mayor Ole von Beust. From 2008, she was State Minister of Science and Research in Hamburg.

Gundelach was elected a member of the German Bundestag in the 2013 federal elections. In that capacity, she served as deputy chairwoman of the Committee on Cultural Affairs and Media. In addition, she was a member of the Committee on Economic Affairs and Energy, where she served as her parliamentary group's rapporteur on energy efficiency and public procurement rules. She was defeated for re-election in 2017.

== Other activities ==
- German Foundation for Monument Protection, Member of the Board of Trustees
- Federal Chancellor Helmut Schmidt Foundation, Substitute Member of the Board of Trustees (since 2017)
- Jewish Museum Berlin, Alternate Member of the Board of Trustees

== Political positions ==
Gundelach was one of 75 CDU/CSU Members of the Bundestag to vote in favor of Germany's introduction of same-sex marriage.

In 2020, Gundelach expressed support for Jens Spahn as candidate to succeed Annegret Kramp-Karrenbauer at the party's 2021 leadership election.
