= Marcus Held =

German politician

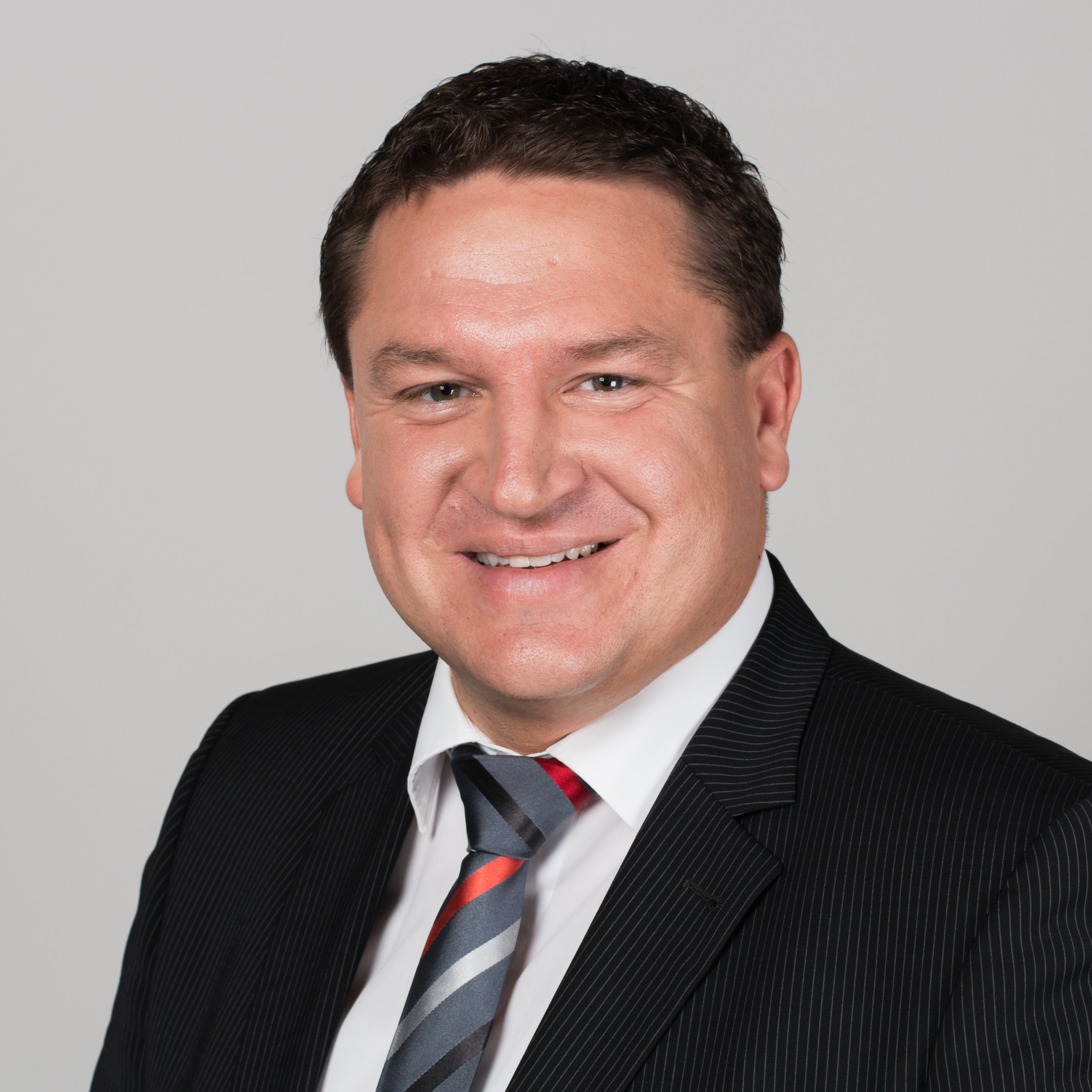
- Marcus Held in 2014

Member of the Bundestag
- In office 2013–2021

Personal details
- Born: 15 October 1977 (age 48) Ludwigshafen am Rhein, West Germany (now Germany)
- Party: SPD

Marcus Held (born 15 October 1977) is a German politician. Born in Ludwigshafen, Rhineland-Palatinate, he represents the SPD. Marcus Held has served as a member of the Bundestag from the state of Rhineland-Palatinate from 2013 to October 2021.

== Life ==
He became member of the bundestag after the 2013 German federal election.

Since 2020 Held is Part of a political scandal.
