= Ute Finckh-Krämer =

German politician

Finckh-Krämer, Ute
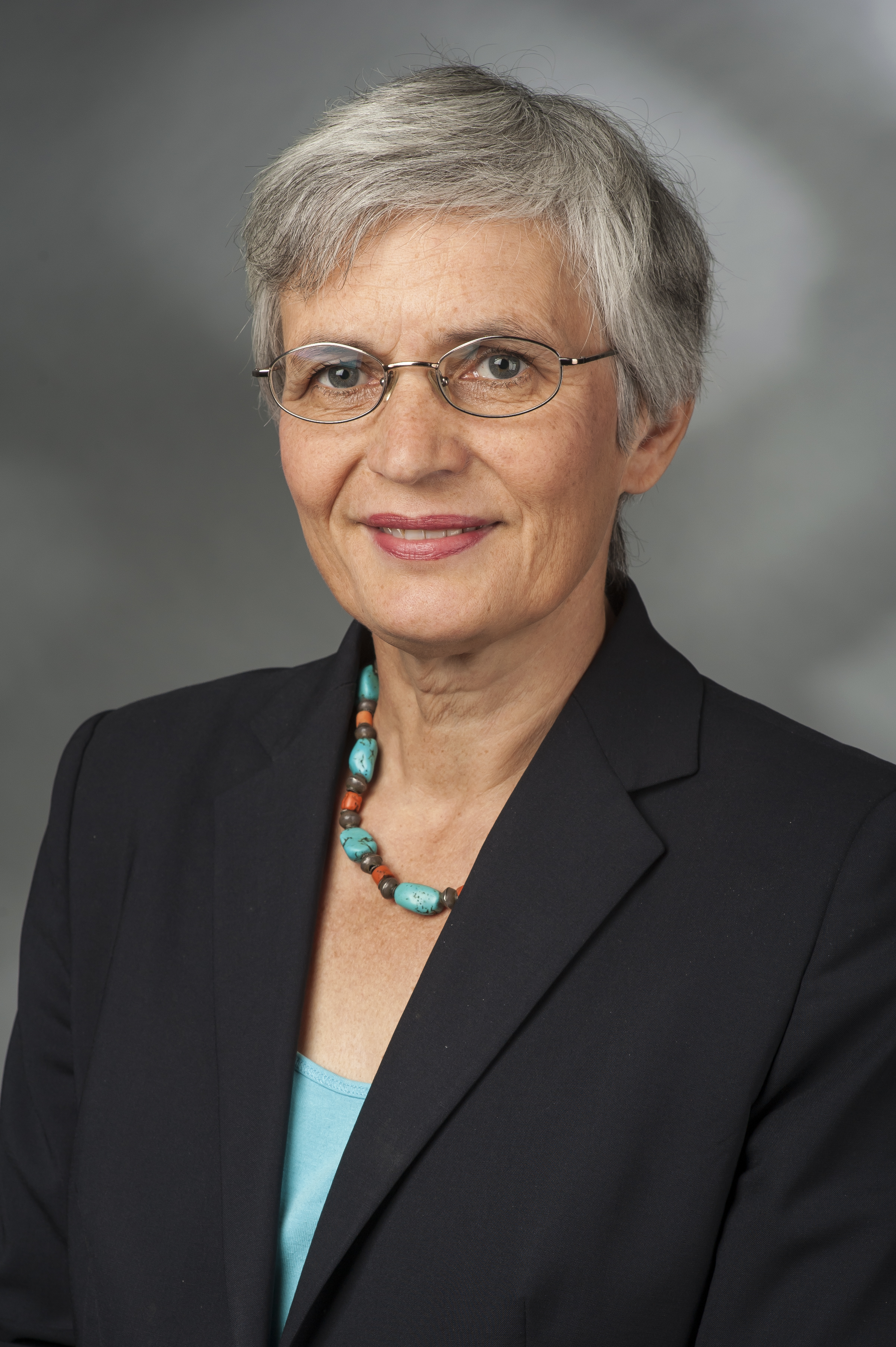
- Ute Finckh-Krämer (2014)
- Born: 16 December 1956 (age 69); Wiesbaden
- Citizenship: German
- Occupation: Mathematician

Ute Elisabeth Finckh-Krämer (born 16 December 1956 in Wiesbaden) is a German politician in the Social Democratic Party of Germany (SPD). She was a member of the Bundestag from October 2013 until October 2017.

== Education and Profession ==
Finckh-Krämer graduated from the Altes Gymnasium (Bremen) in May 1974 and studied mathematics with a minor in physics at the University of Erlangen-Nuremberg. In the summer semester of 1977, she moved to the University of Tübingen, where she graduated in April 1981 with a degree in mathematics. In the year 1986, she obtained her doctoral degree in Tübingen with the dissertation Beiträge zur Wahrscheinlichkeitstheorie auf einer Kingman-Struktur under Herbert Heyer. She first worked as a lecturer in adult and further education in 1987 then worked in the German Central Register for Child Hearing Disorders from 1994 to 2000. She has been a consultant in the Press and Information Office of the Federal Government since September 2001.

== Peace Movement ==
Finckh-Krämer has been active since her student days, having participated in, among other things, the blockade in Großengstingen in the summer of 1982 and participated in a blockade in Mutlangen in the summer of 1984. In 1989, she co-founded Minden / Westphalia with the Bund für Soziale Defense (BSV). She is active for the BSV in the Civil Conflict Transformation Platform.

== SPD membership ==
Finckh-Krämer joined the SPD at the age of 16. From 1996 to 2002 she was a departmental cashier, then from 2002 to 2008 she was district cashier in the SPD district of Steglitz-Zehlendorf (Berlin) and from 2000 to 2002 a member of the board of directors of this district as well as in the year 2009 campaign officer of the same district.

In the 2013 German federal election, Finckh-Krämer was elected to the Bundestag as a candidate of the SPD in Berlin.

Finckh-Krämer was the head of the SPD in the Subcommittee on Civilian Crisis Prevention, Conflict Transformation and Network Action and Deputy Chair of the Subcommittee on Disarmament, Arms Control and Non-Proliferation. In addition, she was a full member of the Foreign Affairs Committee and the Human Rights and Humanitarian Aid Committee. She served as secretary in the Bundestag presidency and was a member of the Parliamentary Assembly of the Council of Europe in January 2018 until the German delegation was replaced.

In the federal election 2017, she was unable to prevail in her constituency with 24.6% of the first votes and was defeated by the CDU candidate Thomas Heilmann (35.4%), so she left the Bundestag.

== Personal life ==
Finckh-Krämer is married and has two adult sons. She has lived in the Berlin district Steglitz-Zehlendorf (until 2001 Steglitz) since 1992. She is the eldest daughter of Ulrich Finckh. Finckh-Krämer is Protestant and is a member of the Lukas parish Steglitz.
