= Lena Strothmann =

German politician

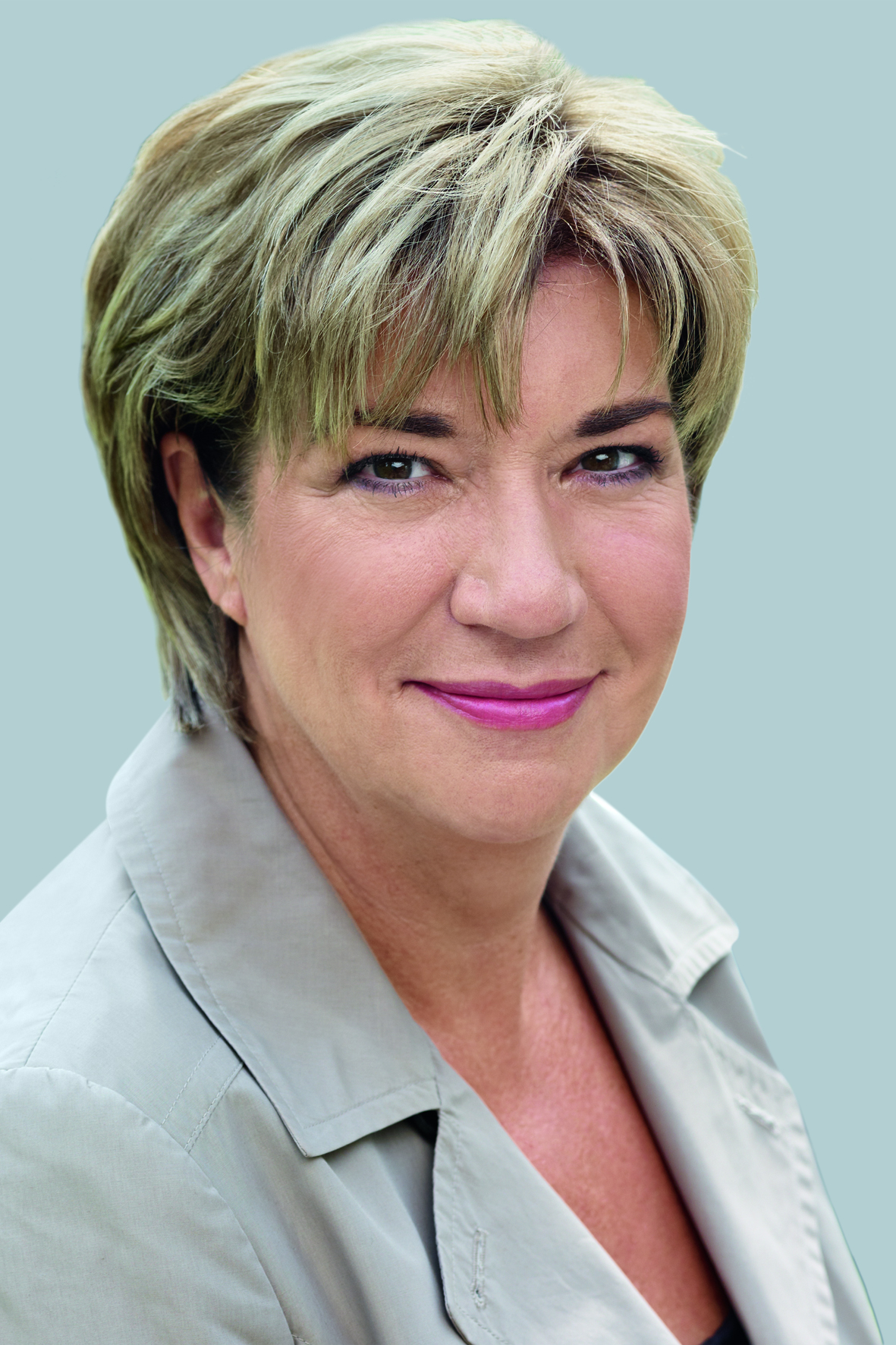

Member of the Bundestag
- In office 2003–2017

Personal details
- Born: 20 December 1952 (age 73)
- Party: Christian Democratic Union of Germany
- Website: lena-strothmann.de

Lena Strothmann, (born Magdalene Tacke 20 December 1952 in Münster), is a German former politician. A member of the Christian Democratic Union of Germany she was served in the Bundestag from 2003 to 2017.
