= Ingrid Fischbach =

Former member of the Bundestag

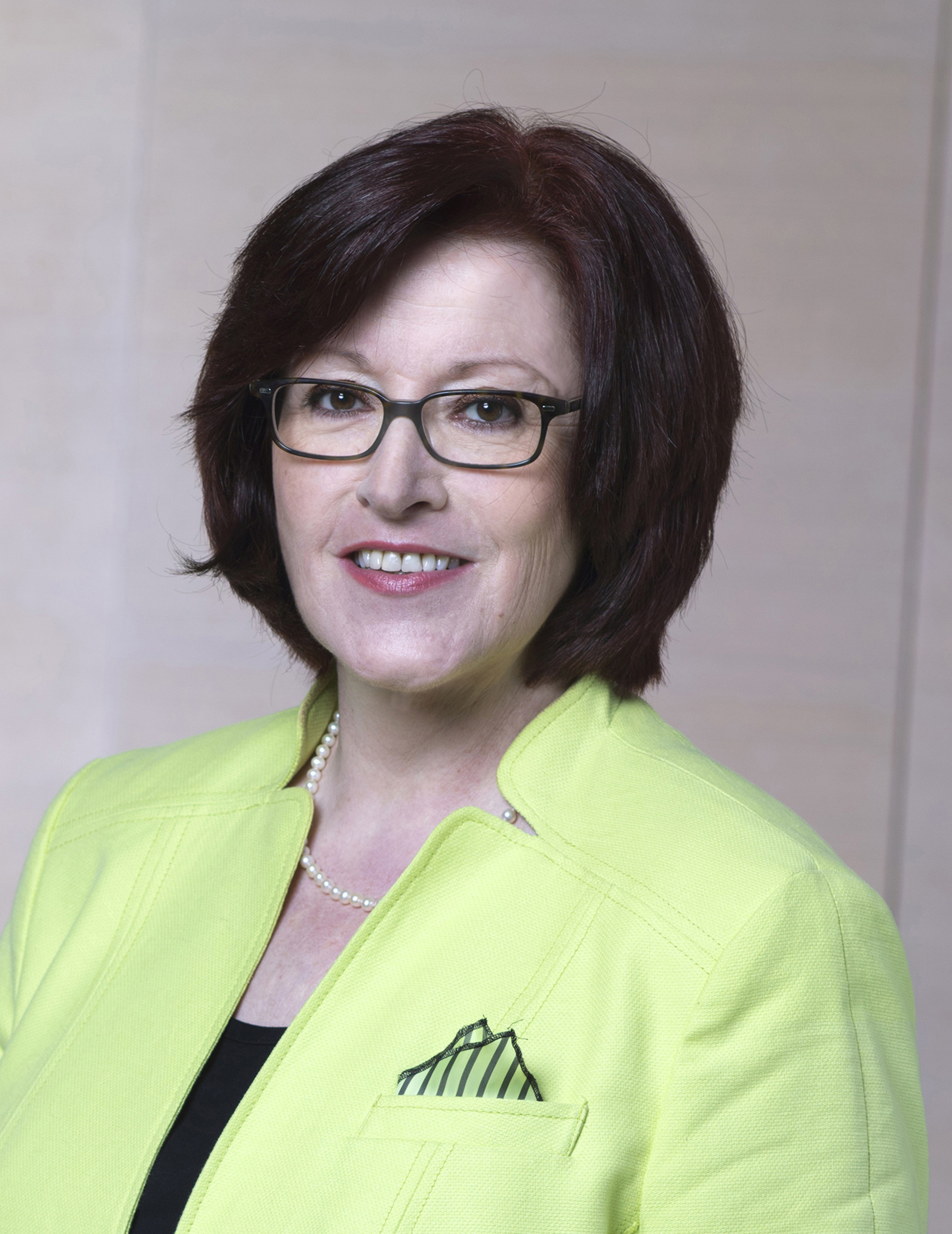
- Ingrid Fischbach in 2013

Member of the Bundestag for Herne – Bochum II
- In office 26 October 1998 – 24 October 2017

Parliamentary State Secretary for Health
- In office 2014 – 24 October 2017

Personal details
- Born: 1957 (age 68–69) Wanne-Eickel, West Germany
- Party: CDU
- Education: Dortmund University

Ingrid Fischbach (born 1957) is a conservative German politician and former member of the Bundestag. A member of the Christian Democratic Union (CDU), she served in the local government of Herne between 1994 and 2007. She was elected to the Bundestag via the state list in 1998 and served until 2017. She was Parliamentary State Secretary for the Federal Ministry of Health from 2014 to 2017.

== Early life ==
Fischbach was born in Wanne-Eickel in 1957. She graduated from Eickel Gymnasium in 1976 and studied teaching at the Dortmund University.

Prior to her entry into politics, Fischbach was a teacher at Erich Fried Comprehensive School and the Evangelical Free Church. She also worked at the Selm/Bork Police Academy.

== Local politics ==
Fischbach joined the CDU in 1990 and served on the Herne local council for four years between 1994 and 1998 before her election to the Bundestag.

== Bundestag ==
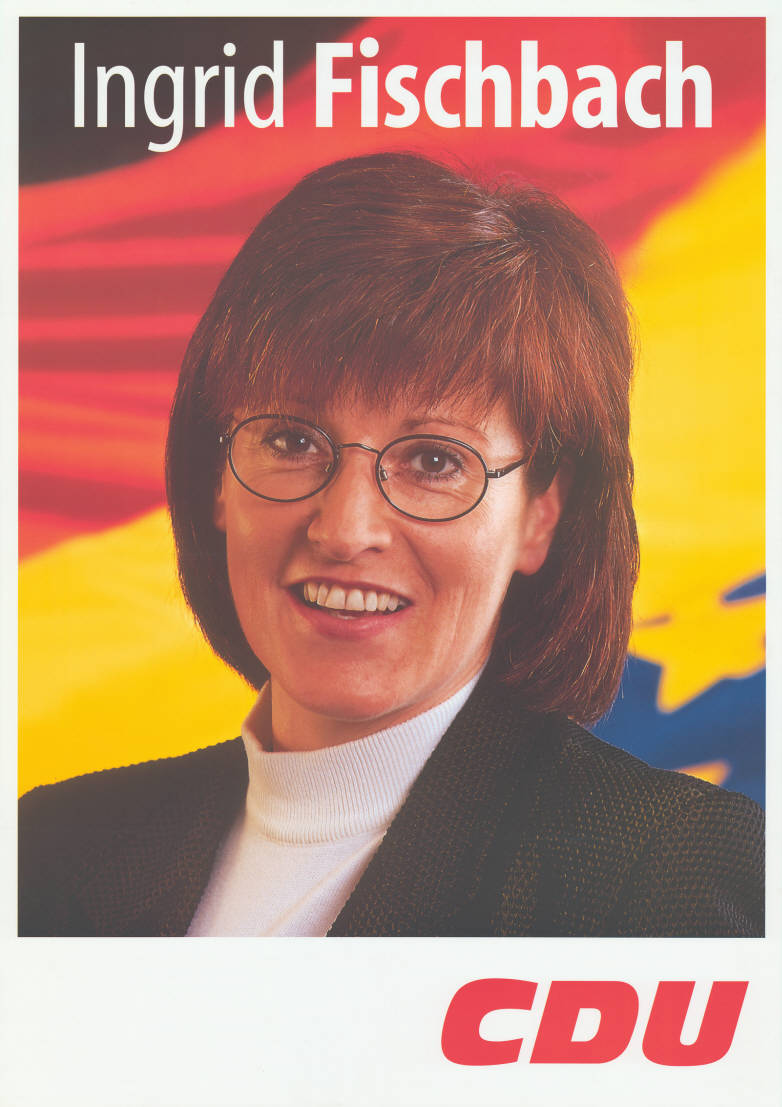
A CDU poster showing Fischbach

Fischbach was elected to the Bundestag via the state list in 1998. She said in 2017 that she had not expected to win in 1998, and that she had planned her candidacy as a "test run" for the 2002 election, but decided to take her seat anyway. She was elected for the Herne constituency.

Before the 2012 North Rhine-Westphalia election, Fischbach was slated to be Minister for Family Affairs and Women in the state; however, the CDU lost the election. In 2014, she was appointed as Parliamentary State Secretary for the Ministry of Health and served until her retirement in 2017. Fischbach served as deputy chairwoman of the CDU parliamentary group. In 2017, Fischbach was appointed as the Federal Commissioner for Patients' Affairs and Nursing Care, and served until late 2018. She was a member of the committees for Labour and Social Affairs and Family Affairs, Senior Citizens, Women and Youth.

To the surprise of several other party members and over the objections of local chairman Markus Schlüter, she decided not to run for re-election to the Bundestag in 2017.

== Other political activities ==
Fischbach was the chairwoman of the CDU's Herne district from 1998 to 2007. Fischbach chaired the Women's Union of North Rhine-Westphalia between 2011 and 2017. In 2013, she was re-elected as chairwoman unanimously.

In 2016, she supported an exchange student scholarship in the United States. Fischbach travelled to Rome along with other members of the Bundestag to meet Pope Francis in 2016. Fischbach is the honorary president of the German Catholic Women's Association in Cologne.

== Political beliefs ==
Fischbach identifies as conservative. She said in 2012 that she supports same-sex marriage. In 2007, she said in response to a constituent's question that she supported the German forces in Afghanistan and opposed their proposed withdrawal.

According to her personal website, Fischbach supports the "special protection" and support of families, equal rights and pay for women, the expansion of affordable healthcare, fair opportunities for children, and fair treatment of all religions.

== Personal life ==
Fischbach is Catholic. She is married and has one daughter.
