= Höxter – Gütersloh III – Lippe II =

Federal electoral district of Germany

135 Höxter – Gütersloh III – Lippe II
- Electoral district for the Bundestag
- Höxter – Gütersloh III – Lippe II in 2025
- State: North Rhine-Westphalia
- Population: 221,400 (2019)
- Electorate: 172,435 (2021)
- Major settlements: Schloß Holte-Stukenbrock; Höxter; Bad Driburg
- Area: 1,625.9 km^{2}

Current electoral district
- Created: 1949
- Party: CDU
- Member: Christian Haase
- Elected: 2013, 2017, 2021, 2025

Höxter – Gütersloh III – Lippe II is an electoral constituency (German: Wahlkreis) represented in the Bundestag. It elects one member via first-past-the-post voting. Under the current constituency numbering system, it is designated as constituency 135. It is located in eastern North Rhine-Westphalia, comprising the Höxter district, a small part of the Gütersloh district, and the southern part of the Lippe district.

Höxter – Gütersloh III – Lippe II was created for the inaugural 1949 federal election. Since 2013, it has been represented by Christian Haase of the Christian Democratic Union (CDU).

== Geography ==
Höxter – Gütersloh III – Lippe II is located in eastern North Rhine-Westphalia. As of the 2021 federal election, it comprises the entirety of the Höxter district, the municipality of Schloß Holte-Stukenbrock from the Gütersloh district, and the municipalities of Augustdorf, Horn-Bad Meinberg, Lügde, Schieder-Schwalenberg, and Schlangen from the Lippe district.

== History ==
Höxter – Gütersloh III – Lippe II was created in 1949, then known as Warburg–Höxter–Büren. From 1965 through 1976, it was named Höxter. From 1980 through 2017, it was named Höxter – Lippe II. It acquired its current name in the 2021 election. In the 1949 election, it was North Rhine-Westphalia constituency 44 in the numbering system. From 1953 through 1961, it was number 103. From 1965 through 1976, it was number 102. From 1980 through 1998, it was a number 106. From 2002 through 2009, it was number 137. In the 2013 through 2021 elections, it was number 136. From the 2025 election, it has been number 135.

Originally, the constituency comprised the districts of Höxter, Warburg, and Büren. From 1980 through 2017, it comprised the district of Höxter and the municipalities of Augustdorf, Detmold, Horn-Bad Meinberg, Lügde, Schieder-Schwalenberg, and Schlangen from the Lippe district. Ahead of the 2021 election, it lost the municipality of Detmold from the Lippe district while acquiring the municipality of Schloß Holte-Stukenbrock from the Gütersloh district.

Election	No.	Name	Borders
1949	44	Warburg–Höxter–Büren	Höxter district; Warburg district; Büren district
1953	103	Warburg–Höxter–Büren	Höxter district; Warburg district; Büren district
1957	103	Warburg–Höxter–Büren	Höxter district; Warburg district; Büren district
1961	103	Warburg–Höxter–Büren	Höxter district; Warburg district; Büren district
1965	102	Höxter	Höxter district; Warburg district; Büren district
1969	102	Höxter	Höxter district; Warburg district; Büren district
1972	102	Höxter	Höxter district; Warburg district; Büren district
1976	102	Höxter	Höxter district; Warburg district; Büren district
1980	106	Höxter – Lippe II	Höxter district; Lippe district (only Augustdorf, Detmold, Horn-Bad Meinberg, Lügde, Schieder-Schwalenberg, and Schlangen municipalities)
1983	106	Höxter – Lippe II	Höxter district; Lippe district (only Augustdorf, Detmold, Horn-Bad Meinberg, Lügde, Schieder-Schwalenberg, and Schlangen municipalities)
1987	106	Höxter – Lippe II	Höxter district; Lippe district (only Augustdorf, Detmold, Horn-Bad Meinberg, Lügde, Schieder-Schwalenberg, and Schlangen municipalities)
1990	106	Höxter – Lippe II	Höxter district; Lippe district (only Augustdorf, Detmold, Horn-Bad Meinberg, Lügde, Schieder-Schwalenberg, and Schlangen municipalities)
1994	106	Höxter – Lippe II	Höxter district; Lippe district (only Augustdorf, Detmold, Horn-Bad Meinberg, Lügde, Schieder-Schwalenberg, and Schlangen municipalities)
1998	106	Höxter – Lippe II	Höxter district; Lippe district (only Augustdorf, Detmold, Horn-Bad Meinberg, Lügde, Schieder-Schwalenberg, and Schlangen municipalities)
2002	137	Höxter – Lippe II	Höxter district; Lippe district (only Augustdorf, Detmold, Horn-Bad Meinberg, Lügde, Schieder-Schwalenberg, and Schlangen municipalities)
2005	137	Höxter – Lippe II	Höxter district; Lippe district (only Augustdorf, Detmold, Horn-Bad Meinberg, Lügde, Schieder-Schwalenberg, and Schlangen municipalities)
2009	137	Höxter – Lippe II	Höxter district; Lippe district (only Augustdorf, Detmold, Horn-Bad Meinberg, Lügde, Schieder-Schwalenberg, and Schlangen municipalities)
2013	136	Höxter – Lippe II	Höxter district; Lippe district (only Augustdorf, Detmold, Horn-Bad Meinberg, Lügde, Schieder-Schwalenberg, and Schlangen municipalities)
2017	136	Höxter – Lippe II	Höxter district; Lippe district (only Augustdorf, Detmold, Horn-Bad Meinberg, Lügde, Schieder-Schwalenberg, and Schlangen municipalities)
2021	136	Höxter – Gütersloh III – Lippe II	Höxter district; Gütersloh district (only Schloß Holte-Stukenbrock municipality); Lippe district (only Augustdorf, Horn-Bad Meinberg, Lügde, Schieder-Schwalenberg, and Schlangen municipalities)
2025	135	Höxter – Gütersloh III – Lippe II	Höxter district; Gütersloh district (only Schloß Holte-Stukenbrock municipality); Lippe district (only Augustdorf, Horn-Bad Meinberg, Lügde, Schieder-Schwalenberg, and Schlangen municipalities)

== Members ==
The constituency has been held continuously by the Christian Democratic Union (CDU) since its creation. It was first represented by Friedrich Holzapfel from 1949 to 1953, followed by Josef Menke until 1965. Heinrich Wilper and Gerd Ritgen then each served a single term. Leo Ernesti was representative from 1972 to 1980, when he was succeeded by Meinolf Michels, who served until 2002. Jürgen Herrmann was representative from 2002 to 2013. Christian Haase was elected in 2013, and re-elected in 2017, 2021 and 2025.

Election	Member	Party	%
1949	Friedrich Holzapfel	CDU	40.3
1953	Josef Menke	CDU	71.7
1957	Josef Menke	CDU	70.5
1961	Josef Menke	CDU	71.8
1965	Heinrich Wilper	CDU	69.8
1969	Gerd Ritgen	CDU	67.5
1972	Leo Ernesti	CDU	67.0
1976	Leo Ernesti	CDU	68.2
1980	Meinolf Michels	CDU	52.6
1983	Meinolf Michels	CDU	58.7
1987	Meinolf Michels	CDU	52.6
1990	Meinolf Michels	CDU	51.7
1994	Meinolf Michels	CDU	50.3
1998	Meinolf Michels	CDU	47.2
2002	Jürgen Herrmann	CDU	47.2
2005	Jürgen Herrmann	CDU	49.2
2009	Jürgen Herrmann	CDU	46.1
2013	Christian Haase	CDU	50.0
2017	Christian Haase	CDU	44.3
2021	Christian Haase	CDU	40.1
2025	Christian Haase	CDU	43.2

== Election results ==
=== 2025 election ===
Federal election (2025): Höxter – Gütersloh III – Lippe II
Notes:	Blue background denotes the winner of the electorate vote. Pink background denotes a candidate elected from their party list. Yellow background denotes an electorate win by a list member, or other incumbent. A ✓ or ✗ denotes status of any incumbent, win or lose respectively.						
Party	Candidate	Votes	%	±%	Party votes	%	±%
CDU	✓ Christian Haase	60,580	43.2	▲3.1	51,273	36.4	▲3.9
AfD	Klaus Lange	28,853	20.6	▲12.1	29,064	20.6	▲12.0
SPD	Katrin Freiberger	26,204	18.7	▼9.3	23,930	17,0	▼10.2
Greens	Annegret Rehrmann	10,481	7.5	▼2.1	11,736	8.3	▼2.7
Left	Petra Riedel	7,395	5.3	▲2.8	7,904	5.6	▲2.8
BSW					5,526	3.9	
FDP	Dennis Niedermark	4,389	3.1	▼4.0	6,076	4.3	▼7.3
FW	Michael Schröder	2,482	1.8	▲0.6	1,073	0.8	0.0
Tierschutzpartei					1,666	1.2	0.0
PARTEI				▼1.8	695	0.5	▼0.5
Volt					520	0.4	▲0.2
dieBasis				▼1.3	399	0.3	▼0.9
BD					243	0.2	
PdF					242	0.2	▲0.1
Team Todenhöfer					218	0.2	▼0.1
Values					160	0.1	
MERA25					29	0.0	
MLPD					16	0.0	0.0
Pirates							▼0.4
Bündnis C							▼0.2
ÖDP							▼0.1
Gesundheitsforschung							▼0.1
Humanists							▼0.1
SGP						0.0	0.0
Informal votes		1,581			1,195		
Total valid votes		140,384			140,770		
Turnout		141,965	83.8	▲5.8			
CDU hold	Majority	31,727	22.6				

=== 2021 election ===
Federal election (2021): Höxter – Gütersloh III – Lippe II
Notes:	Blue background denotes the winner of the electorate vote. Pink background denotes a candidate elected from their party list. Yellow background denotes an electorate win by a list member, or other incumbent. A ✓ or ✗ denotes status of any incumbent, win or lose respectively.						
Party	Candidate	Votes	%	±%	Party votes	%	±%
CDU	✓ Christian Haase	53,294	40.1	▼8.0	43,265	32.5	▼7.3
SPD	Ulrich Kros	37,210	28.0	▲3.2	36,253	27.2	▲3.8
Greens	Nik Riesmeier	12,685	9.5	▲4.5	14,717	11.1	▲5.4
AfD	Klaus Lange	11,244	8.5	▼0.8	11,533	8.7	▼0.9
FDP	Tanja Kuffner	9,462	7.1	▲0.4	15,488	11.6	▼1.0
Left	Alina Wolf	3,345	2.5	▼2.3	3,762	2.8	▼2.9
PARTEI	Annalena Thiel	2,429	1.8		1,367	1.0	▲0.5
dieBasis	Sandra Fröhlingsdorf	1,732	1.3		1,636	1.2	
Tierschutzpartei					1,553	1.2	▲0.6
FW	Michael Schröder	1,529	1.2	▲0.5	1,024	0.8	▲0.4
Pirates					566	0.4	▲0.1
Team Todenhöfer					335	0.3	
Bündnis C					300	0.2	
LIEBE					190	0.1	
ÖDP					186	0.1	▼0.1
Volt					183	0.1	
Gesundheitsforschung					172	0.1	0.0
LfK					126	0.1	
NPD					121	0.1	▼0.1
Humanists					91	0.1	0.0
V-Partei3					74	0.1	0.0
du.					48	0.0	
PdF					40	0.0	
LKR					34	0.0	
MLPD					10	0.0	0.0
DKP					8	0.0	0.0
SGP					6	0.0	0.0
Informal votes		1,416			1,258		
Total valid votes		132,930			133,088		
Turnout		134,346	77.9	▲1.7			
CDU hold	Majority	16,084	12.1	▼11.2			

=== 2017 election ===
Federal election (2017): Höxter – Lippe II
Notes:	Blue background denotes the winner of the electorate vote. Pink background denotes a candidate elected from their party list. Yellow background denotes an electorate win by a list member, or other incumbent. A ✓ or ✗ denotes status of any incumbent, win or lose respectively.						
Party	Candidate	Votes	%	±%	Party votes	%	±%
CDU	✓ Christian Haase	69,910	44.3	▼5.7	58,939	37.3	▼8.5
SPD	Petra Rode-Bosse	42,211	26.7	▼4.6	39,038	24.7	▼5.0
AfD	Norbert Senges	14,443	9.1	▲6.5	15,197	9.6	▲6.0
FDP	Hermann Graf von der Schulenburg	10,813	6.9	▲4.9	19,543	12.4	▲7.5
Greens	Robin Wagener	9,400	6.0	▲0.3	10,194	6.4	▼0.2
Left	Lothar Kowalek	8,724	5.5	▲1.4	10,188	6.4	▲1.3
PARTEI					959	0.6	▲0.3
Tierschutzpartei					956	0.6	
FW	Ralf Ochsenfahrt	1,482	0.9	▲0.2	758	0.5	0.0
Pirates					603	0.4	▼1.5
ÖDP	Wolfgang Seemann	871	0.6	▲0.1	348	0.2	0.0
NPD					336	0.2	▼0.6
AD-DEMOKRATEN					211	0.1	
BGE					158	0.1	
DM					149	0.1	
Gesundheitsforschung					145	0.1	
V-Partei³					139	0.1	
Volksabstimmung					120	0.1	▼0.1
DiB					98	0.1	
Die Humanisten					55	0.0	
MLPD					32	0.0	0.0
DKP					14	0.0	
SGP					11	0.0	0.0
Informal votes		2,029			1,692		
Total valid votes		157,854			158,191		
Turnout		159,883	75.8	▲2.7			
CDU hold	Majority	27,699	17.6	▼1.1			

=== 2013 election ===
Federal election (2013): Höxter – Lippe II
Notes:	Blue background denotes the winner of the electorate vote. Pink background denotes a candidate elected from their party list. Yellow background denotes an electorate win by a list member, or other incumbent. A ✓ or ✗ denotes status of any incumbent, win or lose respectively.						
Party	Candidate	Votes	%	±%	Party votes	%	±%
CDU	Christian Haase	76,882	50.0	▲3.9	70,520	45.8	▲8.1
SPD	Petra Rode-Bosse (Note: Bode-Rosse entered the Bundestag on the SPD list after the resignation of Dirk Becker in October 2015.)	48,159	31.3	▼0.3	45,707	29.7	▲0.7
Greens	Dirk Brinkschmidt	8,757	5.7	▼0.7	10,266	6.7	▼0.8
Left	Ursula Jacob-Reisinger	6,328	4.1	▼1.7	7,894	5.1	▼1.5
FDP	Horst Grumich	2,956	1.9	▼5.8	7,423	4.8	▼10.0
Pirates	Wilk Spieker	2,854	1.9		2,853	1.9	▲0.3
AfD	Markus Jäckel	4,004	2.6		5,545	3.6	
NPD		1,312	0.9	▼0.1	1,188	0.8	0.0
FW		1,086	0.7		807	0.5	
Independent	Kohler	703	0.5				
PARTEI					438	0.3	
ÖDP		693	0.5	▲0.2	400	0.3	▲0.1
Volksabstimmung					221	0.1	▲0.1
PRO					198	0.1	
Nichtwahler					113	0.1	
BIG					91	0.0	
Party of Reason					91	0.1	
REP					88	0.1	▼0.1
RRP					63	0.0	0.0
PSG					29	0.0	0.0
BüSo					22	0.0	0.0
MLPD					22	0.0	0.0
Die Rechte					19	0.0	
Informal votes		2,260			1,996		
Total valid votes		153,734			153,998		
Turnout		155,994	73.1	▲0.1			
CDU hold	Majority	28,723	18.7	▲4.2			

=== 2009 election ===
Federal election (2009): Höxter – Lippe II
Notes:	Blue background denotes the winner of the electorate vote. Pink background denotes a candidate elected from their party list. Yellow background denotes an electorate win by a list member, or other incumbent. A ✓ or ✗ denotes status of any incumbent, win or lose respectively.						
Party	Candidate	Votes	%	±%	Party votes	%	±%
CDU	✓ Jürgen Herrmann	71,813	46.1	▼3.1	58,814	37.7	▼4.3
SPD	Werner Böhler	49,149	31.6	▼5.9	45,184	29.0	▼4.9
FDP	Christoph Wiemers	12,086	7.8	▲3.9	23,125	14.8	▲4.0
Greens	Herbert Falke	9,957	6.4	▲2.8	11,708	7.5	▲1.5
Left	Wolfgang McGregor	9,100	5.8	▲2.7	10,266	6.6	▲2.5
Pirates					2,474	1.6	
FAMILIE	Dagmar Feldmann	1,586	1.0	▼0.2	1,037	0.7	▼0.2
NPD	Burkhard Becker	1,502	1.0	0.0	1,151	0.7	▼0.1
Tierschutzpartei					727	0.5	▲0.1
RENTNER					374	0.2	
ÖDP	Kirsten Wallbraun	455	0.3		309	0.2	
REP					254	0.2	▼0.1
RRP					132	0.1	
Volksabstimmung					125	0.1	0.0
DVU					109	0.1	
Centre					91	0.1	0.0
PSG					31	0.0	0.0
BüSo					21	0.0	0.0
MLPD					21	0.0	0.0
Informal votes		2,673			2,368		
Total valid votes		155,648			155,953		
Turnout		158,321	73.0	▼6.7			
CDU hold	Majority	22,664	14.5	▲2.8			

=== 2005 election ===
Federal election (2005): Höxter – Lippe II
Notes:	Blue background denotes the winner of the electorate vote. Pink background denotes a candidate elected from their party list. Yellow background denotes an electorate win by a list member, or other incumbent. A ✓ or ✗ denotes status of any incumbent, win or lose respectively.						
Party	Candidate	Votes	%	±%	Party votes	%	±%
CDU	✓ Jürgen Herrmann	83,914	49.2	▲2.0	71,732	42.0	▼2.2
SPD	Johannes Reineke	63,922	37.5	▼2.7	57,815	33.9	▼3.0
FDP	Thomas Trappmann	6,648	3.9	▼2.1	18,446	10.8	▲2.2
Greens	Herbert Falke	6,066	3.6	▼0.2	10,196	6.0	▼0.48
Left	Reinhard Otte	5,403	3.2	▲2.3	6,974	4.1	▲3.3
Familie	Martina Renger	2,107	1.2	▲0.5	1,405	0.8	▲0.5
NPD	Eugen Krüger	1,612	0.9		1,402	0.8	▲0.6
PBC	Horst Pajewski	879	0.5	▲0.2	986	0.6	▲0.1
Tierschutzpartei					607	0.4	▲0.1
REP					438	0.3	▼0.1
GRAUEN					317	0.2	▲0.1
From Now on... Democracy Through Referendum					187	0.1	
Centre					69	0.0	
Socialist Equality Party					60	0.0	
MLPD					38	0.0	
BüSo					28	0.0	0.0
Informal votes		3,197			3,048		
Total valid votes		170,551			170,700		
Turnout		173,748	71.6	▼3.0			
CDU hold	Majority	19,992	11.7				
