= Gütersloh I =

Federal electoral district of Germany

130 Gütersloh I
- Electoral district for the Bundestag
- Gütersloh I in 2025
- State: North Rhine-Westphalia
- Population: 326,900 (2019)
- Electorate: 234,177 (2021)
- Major settlements: Gütersloh; Rheda-Wiedenbrück; Rietberg
- Area: 866.3 km^{2}

Current electoral district
- Created: 1980
- Party: CDU
- Member: Ralph Brinkhaus
- Elected: 2009, 2013, 2017, 2021, 2025

Gütersloh I is an electoral constituency (German: Wahlkreis) represented in the Bundestag. It elects one member via first-past-the-post voting. Under the current constituency numbering system, it is designated as constituency 130. It is located in eastern North Rhine-Westphalia, comprising most of the district of Gütersloh.

Gütersloh I was created for the 1980 federal election. Since 2009, it has been represented by Ralph Brinkhaus of the Christian Democratic Union (CDU).

== Geography ==
Gütersloh I is located in eastern North Rhine-Westphalia. As of the 2021 federal election, it comprises the entirety of the Gütersloh district excluding the municipalities of Werther and Schloß Holte-Stukenbrock.

== History ==
Gütersloh I was created in 1980, then known as Gütersloh. It acquired its current name in the 2013 election. In the 1980 through 1998 elections, it was constituency 101 in the numbering system. From 2002 through 2009, it was number 132. In the 2013 through 2021 elections, it was number 131. From the 2025 election, it has been number 130.

Originally, the constituency was coterminous with the Gütersloh district. In the 1998 election, it lost the municipality of Werther. In the 2005 election, it lost the municipality of Schloß Holte-Stukenbrock.

Election	No.	Name	Borders
1980	101	Gütersloh	Gütersloh district
1983	101	Gütersloh	Gütersloh district
1987	101	Gütersloh	Gütersloh district
1990	101	Gütersloh	Gütersloh district
1994	101	Gütersloh	Gütersloh district
1998	101	Gütersloh	Gütersloh district (excluding Werther municipality)
2002	132	Gütersloh	Gütersloh district (excluding Werther municipality)
2005	132	Gütersloh	Gütersloh district (excluding Werther and Schloß Holte-Stukenbrock municipalities)
2009	132	Gütersloh	Gütersloh district (excluding Werther and Schloß Holte-Stukenbrock municipalities)
2013	131	Gütersloh I	Gütersloh district (excluding Werther and Schloß Holte-Stukenbrock municipalities)
2017	131	Gütersloh I	Gütersloh district (excluding Werther and Schloß Holte-Stukenbrock municipalities)
2021	131	Gütersloh I	Gütersloh district (excluding Werther and Schloß Holte-Stukenbrock municipalities)
2025	130	Gütersloh I	Gütersloh district (excluding Werther and Schloß Holte-Stukenbrock municipalities)

== Members ==
The constituency has been held continuously by the Christian Democratic Union (CDU) since its creation. It was first represented by Ottfried Hennig from 1980 to 1990, followed by Hubert Doppmeier until 1994. Hubert Deittert then served from 1994 to 2009. Ralph Brinkhaus was elected in 2009, and re-elected in 2013, 2017, 2021 and 2025.

Election	Member	Party	%
1980	Ottfried Hennig	CDU	51.8
1983	Ottfried Hennig	CDU	59.1
1987	Ottfried Hennig	CDU	52.0
1990	Hubert Doppmeier	CDU	48.6
1994	Hubert Deittert	CDU	48.2
1998	Hubert Deittert	CDU	46.0
2002	Hubert Deittert	CDU	46.2
2005	Hubert Deittert	CDU	48.9
2009	Ralph Brinkhaus	CDU	44.7
2013	Ralph Brinkhaus	CDU	50.2
2017	Ralph Brinkhaus	CDU	46.6
2021	Ralph Brinkhaus	CDU	40.0
2025	Ralph Brinkhaus	CDU	41.6

== Election results ==
=== 2025 election ===
Federal election (2025): Gütersloh I
Notes:	Blue background denotes the winner of the electorate vote. Pink background denotes a candidate elected from their party list. Yellow background denotes an electorate win by a list member, or other incumbent. A ✓ or ✗ denotes status of any incumbent, win or lose respectively.						
Party	Candidate	Votes	%	±%	Party votes	%	±%
CDU	✓ Ralph Brinkhaus	79,377	41.6	▲1.6	63,908	33.4	▲4.0
SPD	Elvan Korkmaz	40,230	21.1	▼4.7	34,663	18.1	▼8.4
AfD	Kai Röchter	32,668	17.1	▲9.9	35,110	18.3	▲10.9
Greens	Sebastian Stölting	17,265	9.0	▼3.8	22,189	11.6	▼4.3
Left	Margrit Dorn	10,489	5.5	▲3.1	12,240	6.4	▲3.5
BSW					8,059	4.2	
FDP	Patrick Büker	5,941	3.1	▼4.5	8,477	4.4	▼7.51.2
FW	Kai Funke	2,493	1.2	▲0.1	1,125	0.6	▼0.2
Volt	Heinrich Ketteler	1,966	1.0		1,229	0.6	▲0.4
Tierschutzpartei					1,908	1.0	▼0.1
PARTEI				▼1.8	956	0.5	▼0.5
Independent	Werner Martinschledde	473	0.2				
dieBasis				▼1.2	423	0.2	▼0.9
Team Todenhöfer					325	0.2	▼0.3
PdF					318	0.2	▲0.1
BD					230	0.1	
Values					127	0.1	
MERA25					54	0.0	
MLPD					30	0.0	0.0
Pirates							▼0.3
Bündnis C							▼0.2
Gesundheitsforschung							▼0.1
ÖDP							▼0.1
Humanists							▼0.1
SGP						0.0	0.0
Informal votes		1,780			1,311		
Total valid votes		190,902			191,371		
Turnout		192,682	82.8	▲6.0			
CDU hold	Majority	39,147	20.5				

=== 2021 election ===
Federal election (2021): Gütersloh I
Notes:	Blue background denotes the winner of the electorate vote. Pink background denotes a candidate elected from their party list. Yellow background denotes an electorate win by a list member, or other incumbent. A ✓ or ✗ denotes status of any incumbent, win or lose respectively.						
Party	Candidate	Votes	%	±%	Party votes	%	±%
CDU	✓ Ralph Brinkhaus	71,185	40.0	▼6.6	52,421	29.4	▼9.0
SPD	Elvan Korkmaz	45,878	25.8	▼2.3	47,371	26.6	▲3.6
Greens	Sebastian Stölting	22,851	12.8	▲7.1	28,308	15.9	▲8.0
FDP	Patrick Büker	13,507	7.6	▲1.1	21,211	11.9	▼1.2
AfD	Axel Nußbaum	12,812	7.2	▼0.8	13,299	7.5	▼1.2
Left	Camila Cirlini	4,284	2.4	▼1.9	5,173	2.9	▼3.2
Tierschutzpartei					1,896	1.1	▲0.5
PARTEI	Ann-Katrin Hanneforth	3,149	1.8		1,851	1.0	▲0.4
FW	Kai Funke	2,083	1.2	▲0.4	1,441	0.8	▲0.4
dieBasis	René Markmann	2,067	1.2		2,010	1.1	
Team Todenhöfer					750	0.4	
Pirates					613	0.3	0.0
Volt					378	0.2	
Bündnis C					272	0.2	
Independent	Werner Martinschledde	269	0.2				
LIEBE					263	0.1	
Gesundheitsforschung					219	0.1	0.0
LfK					157	0.1	
ÖDP					147	0.1	0.0
NPD					135	0.1	▼0.1
V-Partei3					113	0.1	0.0
Humanists					97	0.1	0.0
du.					78	0.0	
PdF					50	0.0	
Independent	Anna Zajonc	37	0.0				
LKR					33	0.0	
DKP					33	0.0	0.0
MLPD					21	0.0	0.0
SGP					8	0.0	0.0
Informal votes		1,604			1,378		
Total valid votes		178,122			178,348		
Turnout		179,726	76.7	▲1.3			
CDU hold	Majority	25,307	14.2	▼4.3			

=== 2017 election ===
Federal election (2017): Gütersloh I
Notes:	Blue background denotes the winner of the electorate vote. Pink background denotes a candidate elected from their party list. Yellow background denotes an electorate win by a list member, or other incumbent. A ✓ or ✗ denotes status of any incumbent, win or lose respectively.						
Party	Candidate	Votes	%	±%	Party votes	%	±%
CDU	✓ Ralph Brinkhaus	81,298	46.6	▼3.7	67,175	38.4	▼7.9
SPD	Elvan Korkmaz	48,942	28.0	▼5.5	40,104	22.9	▼5.8
AfD	Udo Hemmelgarn	13,996	8.0	▲5.5	15,081	8.6	▲5.5
FDP	Philip Winkler	11,401	6.5	▲4.6	22,848	13.1	▲8.1
Greens	Jürgen Wächter	9,992	5.7	▲0.3	13,817	7.9	0.0
Left	Shen Ibrahimsadeh	7,582	4.3	▲0.1	10,595	6.1	▲1.1
PARTEI					1,081	0.6	▲0.4
Tierschutzpartei					975	0.6	
FW	Bernd Kirmes	1,415	0.8		655	0.4	▲0.1
Pirates					595	0.3	▼1.5
AD-DEMOKRATEN					454	0.3	
NPD					329	0.2	▼0.6
ÖDP					220	0.1	▼0.1
DM					178	0.1	
V-Partei³					178	0.1	
Gesundheitsforschung					167	0.1	
Volksabstimmung					152	0.1	0.0
BGE					138	0.1	
DiB					130	0.1	
Die Humanisten					77	0.0	
MLPD					47	0.0	0.0
DKP					21	0.0	
SGP					10	0.0	0.0
Informal votes		2,082			1,681		
Total valid votes		174,626			175,027		
Turnout		176,708	75.4	▲3.1			
CDU hold	Majority	32,356	18.6	▲2.0			

=== 2013 election ===
Federal election (2013): Gütersloh I
Notes:	Blue background denotes the winner of the electorate vote. Pink background denotes a candidate elected from their party list. Yellow background denotes an electorate win by a list member, or other incumbent. A ✓ or ✗ denotes status of any incumbent, win or lose respectively.						
Party	Candidate	Votes	%	±%	Party votes	%	±%
CDU	✓ Ralph Brinkhaus	83,869	50.3	▲5.5	77,361	46.3	▲7.3
SPD	Thorsten Klute	56,031	33.6	▼1.3	47,962	28.7	▲3.1
Greens	Marco Mantovanelli	9,069	5.4	▼1.8	13,148	7.9	▼1.8
Left	Ludger Klein-Ridder	7,133	4.3	▼1.7	8,332	5.0	▼1.5
AfD	Georg Rust	4,178	2.5		5,286	3.2	
FDP	Evelyn Dahlke	3,146	1.9	▼7.3	8,236	4.9	▼9.9
Pirates	Jonas Aust	3,134	1.9		3,070	1.8	▲0.3
NPD					1,260	0.8	0.0
FW					454	0.3	
PARTEI					437	0.3	
ÖDP					354	0.2	0.0
PRO					228	0.1	
Volksabstimmung					222	0.1	0.0
Nichtwahler					171	0.1	
RRP	Rolf Wittkamp	343	0.2		164	0.1	0.0
REP					139	0.1	▼0.1
Party of Reason					112	0.1	
BIG					111	0.1	
PSG					38	0.0	0.0
BüSo					21	0.0	0.0
MLPD					20	0.0	0.0
Die Rechte					17	0.0	
Informal votes		2,080			1,840		
Total valid votes		166,903			167,143		
Turnout		168,983	72.3	▲0.1			
CDU hold	Majority	27,838	16.7	▲4.3			

=== 2009 election ===
Federal election (2009): Gütersloh
Notes:	Blue background denotes the winner of the electorate vote. Pink background denotes a candidate elected from their party list. Yellow background denotes an electorate win by a list member, or other incumbent. A ✓ or ✗ denotes status of any incumbent, win or lose respectively.						
Party	Candidate	Votes	%	±%	Party votes	%	±%
CDU	Ralph Brinkhaus	74,149	44.7	▼4.1	64,808	39.0	▼3.0
SPD	Klaus Brandner	53,509	32.3	▼6.6	42,512	25.6	▼9.0
FDP	Heiner Kamp	15,138	9.1	▲4.6	24,698	14.8	▲4.6
Greens	Marco Mantovanelli	11,924	7.2	▲3.1	16,035	9.6	▲3.0
Left	Herbert Wessel	9,909	6.0	▲2.4	10,855	6.5	▲2.5
Pirates					2,639	1.6	
NPD					1,202	0.7	0.0
Tierschutzpartei					855	0.5	▲0.1
FAMILIE					824	0.5	0.0
RENTNER					546	0.3	
Independent	Axel Dörken	455	0.3				
ÖDP	Renate Narayan	625	0.4		379	0.2	
REP					361	0.2	▼0.1
RRP					177	0.1	
Volksabstimmung					152	0.1	0.0
DVU					118	0.1	
Centre					86	0.1	0.0
MLPD					25	0.0	0.0
BüSo					24	0.0	0.0
PSG					24	0.0	0.0
Informal votes		2,536			1,925		
Total valid votes		165,709			166,320		
Turnout		168,245	72.2	▼7.3			
CDU hold	Majority	20,640	12.4	▲2.4			

=== 2005 election ===
Federal election (2005): Gütersloh
Notes:	Blue background denotes the winner of the electorate vote. Pink background denotes a candidate elected from their party list. Yellow background denotes an electorate win by a list member, or other incumbent. A ✓ or ✗ denotes status of any incumbent, win or lose respectively.						
Party	Candidate	Votes	%	±%	Party votes	%	±%
CDU	✓ Hubert Deittert	87,555	48.9	▲3.1	75,313	41.9	▲0.4
SPD	Klaus Brandner	69,739	38.9	▼9.3	62,042	34.5	▼2.9
FDP	Heiner Kamp	8,125	4.5	▼1.8	18,364	10.2	▲0.5
Greens	Marcel Raschke	7,422	4.1	▼0.48	11,909	6.6	▼1.5
Left	Fritz Ludwig	6,365	3.6	▲2.7	7,270	4.0	▲3.2
NPD					1,228	0.7	▲0.4
Familie					886	0.5	▲0.3
Tierschutzpartei					693	0.4	▲0.1
REP					634	0.4	▲0.1
GRAUEN					465	0.3	▲0.1
PBC					424	0.2	▲0.1
From Now on... Democracy Through Referendum					201	0.1	
Socialist Equality Party					65	0.0	
Centre					50	0.0	
MLPD					37	0.0	
BüSo					28	0.0	0.0
Informal votes		2,735			2,332		
Total valid votes		179,206			179,609		
Turnout		181,941	79.5	▼2.3			
CDU hold	Majority	17,816	10.0				
