= Paderborn (electoral district) =

Federal electoral district of Germany

136 Paderborn
- Electoral district for the Bundestag
- Paderborn – Gütersloh III in 2025
- State: North Rhine-Westphalia
- Population: 307,800 (2019)
- Electorate: 231,534 (2021)
- Major settlements: Paderborn; Delbrück; Salzkotten
- Area: 1,246.8 km^{2}

Current electoral district
- Created: 1949
- Party: CDU
- Member: Carsten Linnemann
- Elected: 2009, 2013, 2017, 2021, 2025

Paderborn is an electoral constituency (German: Wahlkreis) represented in the Bundestag. It elects one member via first-past-the-post voting. Under the current constituency numbering system, it is designated as constituency 136. It is located in eastern North Rhine-Westphalia, comprising the Paderborn district.

Paderborn was created for the inaugural 1949 federal election. Since 2009, it has been represented by Carsten Linnemann of the Christian Democratic Union (CDU).

== Geography ==
Paderborn is located in eastern North Rhine-Westphalia. As of the 2021 federal election, it is coterminous with the Paderborn district.

== History ==
Paderborn was created in 1949, then known as Paderborn – Wiedenbrück. From 1980 through 2009, it was named Paderborn. In 2013 and 2017, it was named Paderborn – Gütersloh III. From the 2021 election, it has again been named Paderborn. In the 1949 election, it was North Rhine-Westphalia constituency 45 in the numbering system. From 1953 through 1961, it was number 104. From 1965 through 1976, it was number 106. From 1980 through 1998, it was number 107. From 2002 through 2009, it was number 138. In the 2013 through 2021 elections, it was number 137. From the 2025 election, it has been number 136.

Originally, the constituency comprised the districts of Paderborn and Wiedenbrück. From 1965 through 1976, it comprised the Padern and Wiedenbrück districts without the municipality of Gütersloh. From 1980 through 2002, it was coterminous with the Padern district. In 2013 and 2017, it also contained the municipality of Schloß Holte-Stukenbrock from the Gütersloh district. Ahead of the 2021 election, Schloß Holte-Stukenbrock was transferred away from the constituency, and it has again been coterminous with the Paderborn district.

| Election | No. | Name | Borders |
|---|---|---|---|
| 1949 | 45 | Paderborn – Wiedenbrück | Paderborn district; Wiedenbrück district |
| 1953 | 104 | Paderborn – Wiedenbrück | Paderborn district; Wiedenbrück district |
| 1957 | 104 | Paderborn – Wiedenbrück | Paderborn district; Wiedenbrück district |
| 1961 | 104 | Paderborn – Wiedenbrück | Paderborn district; Wiedenbrück district |
| 1965 | 106 | Paderborn – Wiedenbrück | Paderborn district; Wiedenbrück district (excluding Gütersloh municipality) |
| 1969 | 106 | Paderborn – Wiedenbrück | Paderborn district; Wiedenbrück district (excluding Gütersloh municipality) |
| 1972 | 106 | Paderborn – Wiedenbrück | Paderborn district; Wiedenbrück district (excluding Gütersloh municipality) |
| 1976 | 106 | Paderborn – Wiedenbrück | Paderborn district; Wiedenbrück district (excluding Gütersloh municipality) |
| 1980 | 107 | Paderborn | Paderborn district |
| 1983 | 107 | Paderborn | Paderborn district |
| 1987 | 107 | Paderborn | Paderborn district |
| 1990 | 107 | Paderborn | Paderborn district |
| 1994 | 107 | Paderborn | Paderborn district |
| 1998 | 107 | Paderborn | Paderborn district |
| 2002 | 138 | Paderborn | Paderborn district |
| 2005 | 138 | Paderborn | Paderborn district; Gütersloh district (only Schloß Holte-Stukenbrock municipality) |
| 2009 | 138 | Paderborn | Paderborn district; Gütersloh district (only Schloß Holte-Stukenbrock municipality) |
| 2013 | 137 | Paderborn – Gütersloh III | Paderborn district; Gütersloh district (only Schloß Holte-Stukenbrock municipality) |
| 2017 | 137 | Paderborn – Gütersloh III | Paderborn district; Gütersloh district (only Schloß Holte-Stukenbrock municipality) |
| 2021 | 137 | Paderborn | Paderborn district |
| 2025 | 136 | Paderborn | Paderborn district |

== Members ==
Due to Paderborn being strongly Catholic, the constituency is considered a safe seat for Christian Democratic Union (CDU) and has been held continuously by them since its creation. It was first represented by Maria Niggemeyer from 1949 to 1957, followed by Rainer Barzel until 1980. Heinrich Pohlmeier then served three terms. Friedhelm Ost was representative from 1990 to 2002, when he was succeeded by Gerhard Wächter, who served until 2009. Carsten Linnemann was elected in 2009, and re-elected in 2013, 2017, 2021, and 2025.

| Election | Member | Party | % |
|---|---|---|---|
| 1949 | Maria Niggemeyer | CDU | 44.2 |
| 1953 | Maria Niggemeyer | CDU | 69.3 |
| 1957 | Rainer Barzel | CDU | 68.2 |
| 1961 | Rainer Barzel | CDU | 64.9 |
| 1965 | Rainer Barzel | CDU | 70.3 |
| 1969 | Rainer Barzel | CDU | 66.8 |
| 1972 | Rainer Barzel | CDU | 63.9 |
| 1976 | Rainer Barzel | CDU | 66.6 |
| 1980 | Heinrich Pohlmeier | CDU | 63.9 |
| 1983 | Heinrich Pohlmeier | CDU | 69.0 |
| 1987 | Heinrich Pohlmeier | CDU | 61.4 |
| 1990 | Friedhelm Ost | CDU | 58.2 |
| 1994 | Friedhelm Ost | CDU | 56.9 |
| 1998 | Friedhelm Ost | CDU | 53.9 |
| 2002 | Gerhard Wächter | CDU | 53.6 |
| 2005 | Gerhard Wächter | CDU | 54.9 |
| 2009 | Carsten Linnemann | CDU | 52.1 |
| 2013 | Carsten Linnemann | CDU | 59.1 |
| 2017 | Carsten Linnemann | CDU | 53.3 |
| 2021 | Carsten Linnemann | CDU | 47.9 |
| 2025 | Carsten Linnemann | CDU | 45.5 |

== Election results ==
=== 2025 election ===
Federal election (2025): Paderborn
| Notes: | Blue background denotes the winner of the electorate vote. Pink background denotes a candidate elected from their party list. Yellow background denotes an electorate win by a list member, or other incumbent. A ✓ or ✗ denotes status of any incumbent, win or lose respectively. | | | | | | |
| Party | Candidate | Votes | % | ±% | Party votes | % | ±% |
|---|---|---|---|---|---|---|---|
| CDU | ✓ Carsten Linnemann | 86,833 | 45.5 | ▼2.4 | 71,383 | 37.3 | ▲4.3 |
| AfD | Alexander Lex | 34,924 | 18.3 | ▲10.9 | 36,232 | 18.9 | ▲3.8 |
| SPD | Burkhard Blienert | 29,105 | 15.2 | ▼3.7 | 26,305 | 13.8 | ▼8.3 |
| Greens | Peter Altenbernd | 20,144 | 10.6 | ▼2.4 | 21,998 | 11.5 | ▼3.7 |
| Left | Charlotte Neuhäuser | 11,950 | 6.3 | ▲3.1 | 13,551 | 7.1 | ▲3.8 |
| BSW | | | | | 7,567 | 4.0 | |
| FDP | Alexander Senn | 4,528 | 2.4 | ▼3.2 | 8,049 | 4.2 | ▼8.2 |
| PARTEI | Peter Salmen | 3,392 | 1.8 | ▼0.2 | 1,170 | 0.6 | ▼0.5 |
| Tierschutzpartei | | | | | 1,867 | 1.0 | ▼0.1 |
| Volt | | | | | 979 | 0.5 | ▲0.2 |
| FW | | | | ▼0.8 | 667 | 0.3 | ▼0.3 |
| dieBasis | | | | ▼1.3 | 510 | 0.3 | ▼1.0 |
| Team Todenhöfer | | | | | 285 | 0.1 | ▼0.1 |
| PdF | | | | | 280 | 0.1 | ▲0.1 |
| BD | | | | | 226 | 0.1 | |
| Values | | | | | 135 | 0.1 | |
| MERA25 | | | | | 41 | 0.0 | |
| MLPD | | | | | 27 | 0.0 | 0.0 |
| Pirates | | | | | | | ▼0.3 |
| Bündnis C | | | | | | | ▼0.2 |
| Gesundheitsforschung | | | | | | | ▼0.1 |
| Humanists | | | | | | | ▼0.1 |
| ÖDP | | | | | | | ▼0.1 |
| SGP | | | | | | 0.0 | 0.0 |
| Informal votes | | 1,503 | | | 1,107 | | |
| Total valid votes | | 190,876 | | | 191,272 | | |
| Turnout | | 192,379 | 83.1 | ▲6.0 | | | |
| CDU hold | Majority | 51,909 | 27.2 | | | | |

=== 2021 election ===
Federal election (2021): Paderborn
| Notes: | Blue background denotes the winner of the electorate vote. Pink background denotes a candidate elected from their party list. Yellow background denotes an electorate win by a list member, or other incumbent. A ✓ or ✗ denotes status of any incumbent, win or lose respectively. | | | | | | |
| Party | Candidate | Votes | % | ±% | Party votes | % | ±% |
|---|---|---|---|---|---|---|---|
| CDU | ✓ Carsten Linnemann | 84,669 | 47.9 | ▼5.7 | 58,419 | 33.0 | ▼7.7 |
| SPD | Burkhard Blienert | 33,513 | 19.0 | ▼0.7 | 39,089 | 22.1 | ▲3.4 |
| Greens | Jörg Schlüter | 22,926 | 13.0 | ▲6.9 | 26,981 | 15.2 | ▲7.8 |
| AfD | Günter Koch | 13,152 | 7.4 | ▼1.6 | 14,360 | 8.1 | ▼1.8 |
| FDP | Roze Özmen | 9,845 | 5.6 | ▲0.2 | 21,877 | 12.4 | ▼1.0 |
| Left | Martina Schu | 5,532 | 3.1 | ▼2.1 | 5,858 | 3.3 | ▼3.4 |
| PARTEI | Rosanna Martens | 3,459 | 2.0 | | 1,925 | 1.1 | ▲0.4 |
| dieBasis | Anna Löper | 2,298 | 1.3 | | 2,195 | 1.2 | |
| Tierschutzpartei | | | | | 1,863 | 1.1 | ▲0.5 |
| FW | Günter Arlt | 1,443 | 0.8 | | 1,137 | 0.6 | ▲0.4 |
| Pirates | | | | | 600 | 0.3 | ▼0.1 |
| Team Todenhöfer | | | | | 523 | 0.3 | |
| Volt | | | | | 495 | 0.3 | |
| Bündnis C | | | | | 310 | 0.2 | |
| LIEBE | | | | | 220 | 0.1 | |
| Gesundheitsforschung | | | | | 191 | 0.1 | 0.0 |
| LfK | | | | | 160 | 0.1 | |
| Humanists | | | | | 148 | 0.1 | 0.0 |
| NPD | | | | | 135 | 0.1 | ▼0.1 |
| ÖDP | | | | | 134 | 0.1 | 0.0 |
| V-Partei3 | | | | | 108 | 0.1 | ▼0.1 |
| du. | | | | | 79 | 0.0 | |
| PdF | | | | | 62 | 0.0 | |
| LKR | | | | | 37 | 0.0 | |
| MLPD | | | | | 28 | 0.0 | 0.0 |
| DKP | | | | | 26 | 0.0 | 0.0 |
| SGP | | | | | 22 | 0.0 | 0.0 |
| Informal votes | | 1,540 | | | 1,395 | | |
| Total valid votes | | 176,837 | | | 176,982 | | |
| Turnout | | 178,377 | 77.0 | ▲2.0 | | | |
| CDU hold | Majority | 51,156 | 28.9 | ▼5.0 | | | |

=== 2017 election ===
Federal election (2017): Paderborn – Gütersloh III
| Notes: | Blue background denotes the winner of the electorate vote. Pink background denotes a candidate elected from their party list. Yellow background denotes an electorate win by a list member, or other incumbent. A ✓ or ✗ denotes status of any incumbent, win or lose respectively. | | | | | | |
| Party | Candidate | Votes | % | ±% | Party votes | % | ±% |
|---|---|---|---|---|---|---|---|
| CDU | ✓ Carsten Linnemann | 99,004 | 53.3 | ▼5.8 | 75,628 | 40.7 | ▼10.6 |
| SPD | Burkhard Blienert | 36,983 | 19.9 | ▼3.3 | 35,055 | 18.9 | ▼4.5 |
| AfD | Andreas Kemper | 16,891 | 9.1 | ▲7.1 | 18,484 | 9.9 | ▲6.3 |
| Greens | Hartmut Oster | 11,116 | 6.0 | ▼0.6 | 13,612 | 7.3 | ▲0.2 |
| FDP | Nicola Claudia Hagemeister | 10,228 | 5.5 | ▲3.6 | 24,976 | 13.4 | ▲8.4 |
| Left | Siegfried Nowak | 9,554 | 5.1 | ▲1.1 | 12,292 | 6.6 | ▲1.4 |
| PARTEI | | | | | 1,266 | 0.7 | ▲0.4 |
| Tierschutzpartei | | | | | 1,084 | 0.6 | |
| Pirates | Sabine Martiny | 1,821 | 1.0 | ▼1.2 | 814 | 0.4 | ▼1.7 |
| FW | | | | | 488 | 0.3 | 0.0 |
| DM | | | | | 309 | 0.2 | |
| AD-DEMOKRATEN | | | | | 301 | 0.2 | |
| NPD | | | | | 294 | 0.2 | ▼0.6 |
| ÖDP | | | | | 223 | 0.1 | 0.0 |
| V-Partei³ | | | | | 212 | 0.1 | |
| DiB | | | | | 191 | 0.1 | |
| Volksabstimmung | | | | | 172 | 0.1 | ▼0.1 |
| BGE | | | | | 162 | 0.1 | |
| Gesundheitsforschung | | | | | 162 | 0.1 | |
| Die Humanisten | | | | | 110 | 0.1 | |
| MLPD | | | | | 39 | 0.0 | 0.0 |
| SGP | | | | | 13 | 0.0 | 0.0 |
| DKP | | | | | 10 | 0.0 | |
| Informal votes | | 1,882 | | | 1,582 | | |
| Total valid votes | | 185,597 | | | 185,897 | | |
| Turnout | | 187,479 | 75.2 | ▲3.9 | | | |
| CDU hold | Majority | 62,021 | 33.4 | ▼2.5 | | | |

=== 2013 election ===
Federal election (2013): Paderborn – Gütersloh III
| Notes: | Blue background denotes the winner of the electorate vote. Pink background denotes a candidate elected from their party list. Yellow background denotes an electorate win by a list member, or other incumbent. A ✓ or ✗ denotes status of any incumbent, win or lose respectively. | | | | | | |
| Party | Candidate | Votes | % | ±% | Party votes | % | ±% |
|---|---|---|---|---|---|---|---|
| CDU | ✓ Carsten Linnemann | 102,867 | 59.1 | ▲7.0 | 89,394 | 51.3 | ▲8.3 |
| SPD | Burkhard Blienert | 40,429 | 23.2 | ▼2.1 | 40,630 | 23.3 | ▲2.8 |
| Greens | Kerstin Haarmann | 11,254 | 6.5 | ▼0.6 | 12,445 | 7.1 | ▼1.4 |
| Left | Siegfried Nowak | 6,969 | 4.0 | ▼1.5 | 9,065 | 5.2 | ▼0.9 |
| Pirates | Sabine Martiny | 3,800 | 2.2 | | 3,682 | 2.1 | ▲0.1 |
| AfD | Ramón Hansmeyer | 3,521 | 2.0 | | 6,296 | 3.6 | |
| FDP | Heinz Heineke | 3,296 | 1.9 | ▼7.1 | 8,774 | 5.0 | ▼11.9 |
| NPD | Martin Wibbeke | 1,442 | 0.8 | ▼0.2 | 1,383 | 0.8 | 0.0 |
| FW | | | | | 500 | 0.3 | |
| Independent | Hans Josef Tegethof | 468 | 0.3 | | | | |
| PARTEI | | | | | 438 | 0.3 | |
| ÖDP | | | | | 293 | 0.2 | ▲0.1 |
| Volksabstimmung | | | | | 257 | 0.1 | ▲0.1 |
| PRO | | | | | 248 | 0.1 | |
| Nichtwahler | | | | | 187 | 0.1 | |
| REP | | | | | 132 | 0.1 | ▼0.1 |
| Party of Reason | | | | | 126 | 0.1 | |
| BIG | | | | | 119 | 0.1 | |
| RRP | | | | | 76 | 0.0 | 0.0 |
| BüSo | | | | | 31 | 0.0 | 0.0 |
| PSG | | | | | 31 | 0.0 | 0.0 |
| Die Rechte | | | | | 24 | 0.0 | |
| MLPD | | | | | 17 | 0.0 | 0.0 |
| Informal votes | | 2,103 | | | 2,001 | | |
| Total valid votes | | 174,046 | | | 174,148 | | |
| Turnout | | 176,149 | 71.3 | ▲0.4 | | | |
| CDU hold | Majority | 62,438 | 35.9 | ▲9.1 | | | |

=== 2009 election ===
Federal election (2009): Paderborn
| Notes: | Blue background denotes the winner of the electorate vote. Pink background denotes a candidate elected from their party list. Yellow background denotes an electorate win by a list member, or other incumbent. A ✓ or ✗ denotes status of any incumbent, win or lose respectively. | | | | | | |
| Party | Candidate | Votes | % | ±% | Party votes | % | ±% |
|---|---|---|---|---|---|---|---|
| CDU | Carsten Linnemann | 88,754 | 52.1 | ▼2.8 | 73,354 | 43.0 | ▼6.9 |
| SPD | Ute Berg | 43,120 | 25.3 | ▼6.0 | 34,925 | 20.5 | ▼7.1 |
| FDP | Wolfgang Klare | 15,282 | 9.0 | ▲4.6 | 28,805 | 16.9 | ▲6.8 |
| Greens | Stefan Schwan | 12,001 | 7.0 | ▲3.1 | 14,619 | 8.6 | ▲2.9 |
| Left | Udo Strüker | 9,436 | 5.5 | ▲2.3 | 10,380 | 6.1 | ▲2.4 |
| Pirates | | | | | 3,478 | 2.0 | |
| FAMILIE | | | | | 1,111 | 0.7 | ▼0.2 |
| NPD | Eduard Plischka | 1,757 | 1.0 | ▲0.1 | 1,340 | 0.8 | 0.0 |
| Tierschutzpartei | | | | | 810 | 0.5 | ▲0.1 |
| RENTNER | | | | | 467 | 0.3 | |
| REP | | | | | 377 | 0.2 | 0.0 |
| ÖDP | | | | | 184 | 0.1 | |
| Volksabstimmung | | | | | 149 | 0.1 | 0.0 |
| RRP | | | | | 145 | 0.1 | |
| DVU | | | | | 116 | 0.1 | |
| Centre | | | | | 113 | 0.1 | 0.0 |
| PSG | | | | | 28 | 0.0 | 0.0 |
| BüSo | | | | | 26 | 0.0 | 0.0 |
| MLPD | | | | | 24 | 0.0 | 0.0 |
| Informal votes | | 2,208 | | | 2,107 | | |
| Total valid votes | | 170,350 | | | 170,451 | | |
| Turnout | | 172,558 | 70.9 | ▼7.9 | | | |
| CDU hold | Majority | 45,634 | 26.8 | ▲3.3 | | | |

=== 2005 election ===
Federal election (2005): Paderborn
| Notes: | Blue background denotes the winner of the electorate vote. Pink background denotes a candidate elected from their party list. Yellow background denotes an electorate win by a list member, or other incumbent. A ✓ or ✗ denotes status of any incumbent, win or lose respectively. | | | | | | |
| Party | Candidate | Votes | % | ±% | Party votes | % | ±% |
|---|---|---|---|---|---|---|---|
| CDU | ✓ Gerhard Wächter | 101,231 | 54.9 | ▲1.5 | 91,872 | 49.9 | ▼9.3 |
| SPD | Ute Berg | 57,815 | 31.4 | ▼0.4 | 50,815 | 27.6 | ▼9.3 |
| FDP | Heinrich Heineke | 8,137 | 4.4 | ▼2.2 | 18,595 | 10.1 | ▲1.5 |
| Greens | Klaus Schröder | 7,278 | 3.9 | ▼1.5 | 10,487 | 5.7 | ▼0.9 |
| Left | Reinhard Borgmeier | 5,944 | 3.2 | ▲2.5 | 6,818 | 3.7 | ▲2.9 |
| Familie | Eva Gockel | 2,254 | 1.2 | ▲0.7 | 1,512 | 0.8 | ▲0.5 |
| NPD | Tobias Heinekamp | 1,695 | 0.9 | | 1,464 | 0.8 | ▲0.7 |
| PBC | | | | | 722 | 0.4 | ▲0.3 |
| Tierschutzpartei | | | | | 626 | 0.3 | ▲0.1 |
| REP | | | | | 485 | 0.3 | 0.0 |
| GRAUEN | | | | | 363 | 0.2 | ▲0.1 |
| From Now on... Democracy Through Referendum | | | | | 166 | 0.1 | |
| Socialist Equality Party | | | | | 70 | 0.0 | |
| Centre | | | | | 68 | 0.0 | |
| MLPD | | | | | 49 | 0.0 | |
| BüSo | | | | | 29 | 0.0 | 0.0 |
| Informal votes | | 2,789 | | | 3,002 | | |
| Total valid votes | | 184,354 | | | 184,141 | | |
| Turnout | | 187,143 | 78.7 | ▼2.5 | | | |
| CDU hold | Majority | 43,416 | 23.5 | | | | |
