= Ernst Böcker =

Ernst Böcker (born 12 October 1860 in Herzebrock, Kingdom of Prussia, died 14 August 1946 in Minden, Germany) was a German master craftsman, inventor and businessman. In 1908 he patented an apparatus for the acidification of dough and a little later developed a safe sourdough starter product for rye fermentation processes, revolutionizing the quality of rye breads and subsequently increasing the overall-quality of bread products.

== Biography ==
Ernst Böcker was born in Herzebrock, a village not far from the cities of Gütersloh and Rheda-Wiedenbrück in today's North Rhine-Westphalia. He was born into a family of Catholic craftsmen and teachers. He had several brothers and sisters. When Ernst Böcker was 16 years old, he began an apprenticeship in a yeast factory and distillery in nearby Rheda-Wiedenbrück. At that time, yeast factories and distilleries were often housed together. Sometime in the 1880s, Ernst Böcker moved to Minden in Westphalia as a master craftsman. In Minden, he worked for a distillery. Ernst Böcker met his future wife Maria Tigges (1868–1926) in the city and they later got married. The couple had four children, two sons and two girls. The older one, Hermann (1896–1956), later worked with his father Ernst in the family business, the younger one became a Franciscan Friar. While Ernst Böcker worked in Minden, he would often meet with a friend who was a baker. Ernst Böcker was intrigued by the problems his friend encountered: rye breads tended to greatly vary in quality because the fermentation process could not be controlled: sometimes the breads were excellent, sometimes inedible. Using his knowledge about yeast and distilling and applying it to the field of baking, Ernst Böcker developed an apparatus for the acidification of dough, which was patented in 1908. He subsequently worked on a safe and reliable sourdough starter product, with which rye breads could be produced in constant good quality. He distributed the sourdough starter product from 1910 onwards and also advertised it, naming it Reinzucht-Sauerteig. Ernst Böcker continued his full-time work in the distillery and worked on his inventions in his free time, until his son Hermann lost his job due to the hyperinflation crisis in Germany in 1923. They then decided to open a business together which soon had more than 10,000 customers in Germany alone, all using the sourdough starter product developed by Ernst Böcker in his kitchen. The company is still in operation today. During the next two decades, Hermann Böcker mostly took over from his now older father. Ernst Böcker died in 1946, after having witnessed the destruction of his company in an Aerial bombing conducted by the US Air Force on 28 March 1945, which destroyed large parts of the inner city of Minden. Hermann Böcker had the company later rebuild in a different part of the city.
