= Carsten Linnemann =

German economist and politician (born 1977)

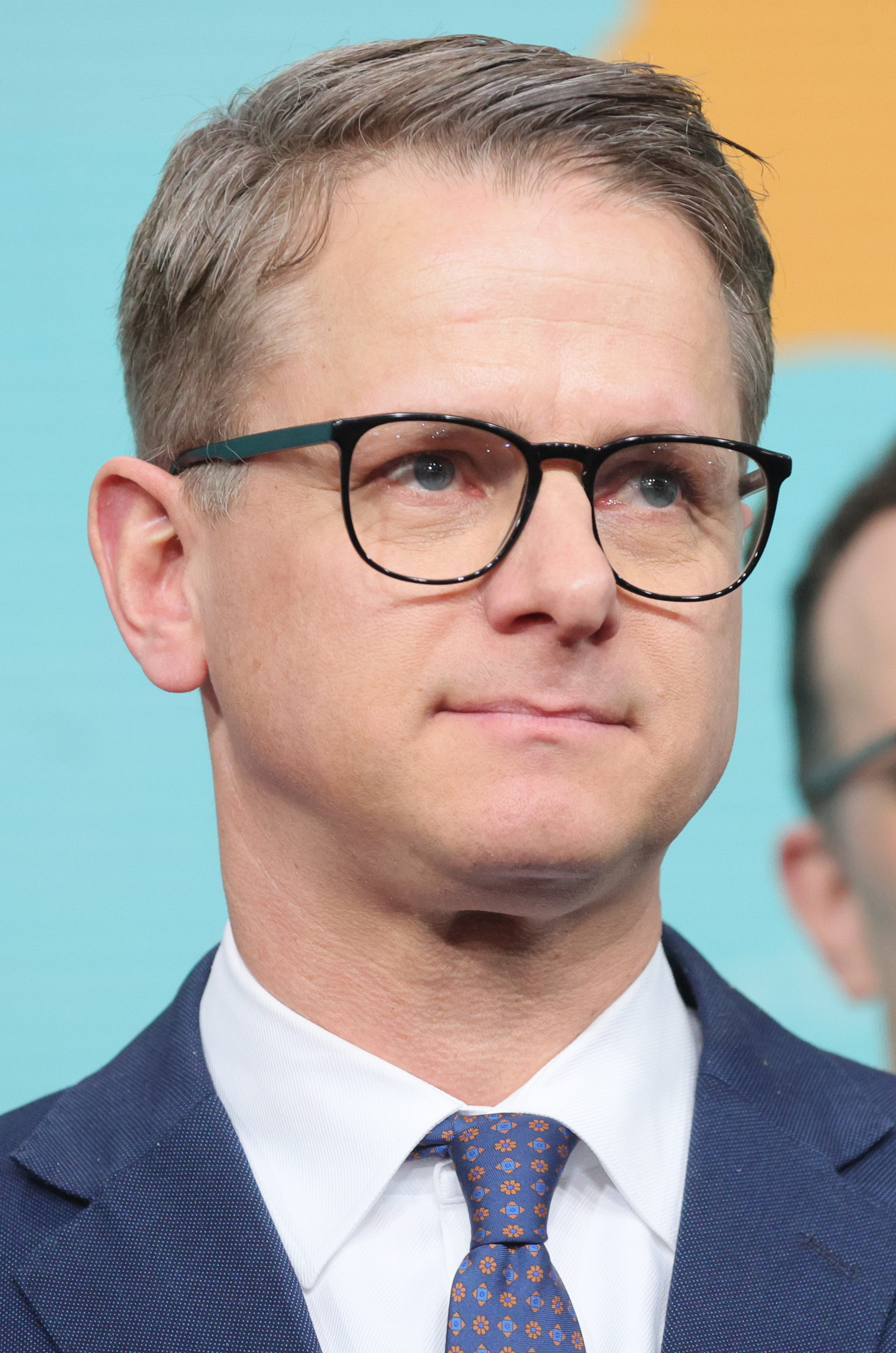
- Linnemann in 2025

Minister of Health
- Incumbent
- Assumed office 29 July 2026
- Chancellor: Friedrich Merz
- Preceded by: Nina Warken

General Secretary of the Christian Democratic Union
- In office 12 July 2023 (Note: Acting: 12 July 2023 – 6 May 2024) – 27 July 2026
- Deputy: Christina Stumpp
- Leader: Friedrich Merz
- Preceded by: Mario Czaja
- Succeeded by: Franziska Hoppermann (acting)

Deputy Leader of the Christian Democratic Union
- In office 20 January 2022 – 6 May 2024 Serving with Silvia Breher, Andreas Jung, Michael Kretschmer and Karin Prien
- Leader: Friedrich Merz
- Preceded by: Jens Spahn
- Succeeded by: Karl-Josef Laumann

Member of the Bundestag for Paderborn
- Incumbent
- Assumed office 27 October 2009
- Preceded by: Gerhard Wächter

Personal details
- Born: Carsten Christoffer Linnemann; 10 August 1977 (age 49) Paderborn, North Rhine-Westphalia, West Germany (current-day Germany)
- Party: Christian Democratic Union

Carsten Christoffer Linnemann (born 10 August 1977) is a German economist and politician of the Christian Democratic Union (CDU) who has been serving as Federal Minister of Health in the government of Chancellor Friedrich Merz since 2026. He has been a member of the Bundestag since the 2009 election, representing the constituency of Paderborn in North Rhine-Westphalia.

From 2022, Linnemann was one of five deputy chairs of the CDU, under the leadership of chairman Friedrich Merz. In 2024 he became CDU general secretary after having assumed the position in an acting capacity the year before; initially, he held on to that role rather than becoming a member of the Merz's cabinet. He left the position in July 2026 to become health minister. From 2013 until 2021, Linnemann was the chairman of the Mittelstands- und Wirtschaftsunion (MIT), the pro-business wing in the CDU/CSU.

== Professional career ==
Between 2006 and 2007, Linnemann was an assistant to Norbert Walter, chief economist of Deutsche Bank. He subsequently worked as economist with IKB Deutsche Industriebank from 2007 to 2009, where he focused on small and medium enterprises.

== Political career ==
From 2009, Linnemann served on the Committee on Labor and Social Affairs, where he was his parliamentary group's rapporteur on welfare payments (Arbeitslosengeld II).

In the negotiations to form a Grand Coalition of the Christian Democrats (CDU together with the Bavarian CSU) and the Social Democrats (SPD) following the 2013 federal elections, Linnemann was part of the CDU/CSU delegation in the working group on labor policy, led by Ursula von der Leyen and Andrea Nahles. In similar talks following the 2017 federal elections, he was again part of the working group on social affairs, this time led Nahles, Karl-Josef Laumann and Barbara Stamm. However, he later abstained in the party leadership's vote on endorsing the renewed grand coalition under Chancellor Angela Merkel.

From 2018 to 2021, Linnemann served as deputy chairman of the CDU/CSU parliamentary group under the leadership of successive chairmen Volker Kauder and Ralph Brinkhaus. In this capacity, he oversaw the group's initiatives on economic policy, small and medium businesses, tourism and energy.

From 2022 to 2024, Linnemann led a working group – alongside Serap Güler and Mario Voigt – in charge of drafting the CDU's new party platform.

== Other activities ==
- Competence Center for Sustainable Energy Technology, University of Paderborn, Member of the Advisory Board (since 2011)
- Institute for Lightweight Design with Hybrid Systems (ILH), University of Paderborn, Member of the Advisory Board (since 2011)
- Ludwig Erhard Foundation, Member
- SC Paderborn 07, Deputy Chairman of the Business Advisory Council

== Political positions ==
On 17 July 2015, Linnemann voted against the government's proposal to negotiate a third bailout for Greece. In June 2017, he voted against Germany's introduction of same-sex marriage.

In 2019, Linnemann drew sharp criticism for saying that children who speak little German should not immediately be allowed to enter elementary school.

Ahead of the 2021 national elections, Linnemann endorsed Armin Laschet as the Christian Democrats' joint candidate to succeed Chancellor Angela Merkel.

Linnemann is a critic of – in his words "dangerous" – plans to ban far-right AfD.

== See also ==
- List of members of the 17th Bundestag
- List of members of the 21st Bundestag
