= Craemer Group =

Coordinates: 51.878276°N 8.241393°E

- Type: GmbH (Holding)
- Founded: 1912
- Headquarters: Herzebrock-Clarholz,
- Key people: Sebastian P. Brandenburg and Christoph J. Brandenburg (both Chairman Craemer GmbH), Siegbert Geldner (Managing Director Craemer GmbH)
- Products: Metal forming, plastics processing and tool making
- Revenue: 380 M Euro (2025)
- Number of employees: around 1100 (2025)

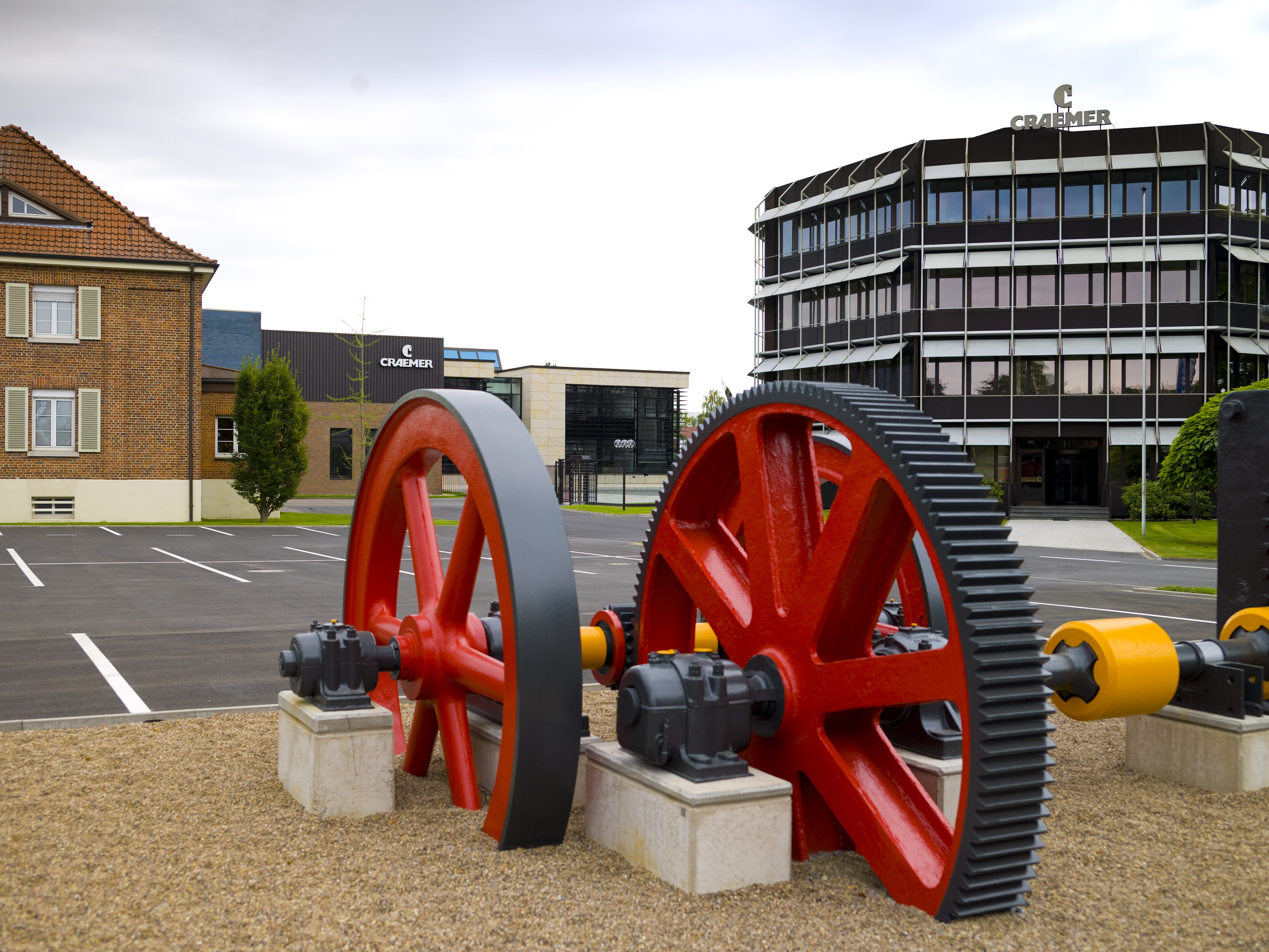
Main Entrance of the Craemer GmbH, headquarters of the Craemer Group in Herzebrock-Clarholz

The Craemer Group is a company based in the German town of Herzebrock-Clarholz (district of Gütersloh, North Rhine-Westphalia). Today, the company, founded in 1912 by Paul Craemer as Press-, Stanz- und Hammerwerke GmbH, employs a staff of around 1100 in metal forming, tool making and plastics processing and achieved a total operating performance of around 360 million Euros in 2024. The group consists of the umbrella company Craemer Holding GmbH, its subsidiary Craemer GmbH and the subsidiaries thereof.

== Company profile ==
The Craemer Group is an internationally active family company specialised in metal forming, plastics processing and tool making. Their headquarters is the Craemer GmbH founded in 1912 and located in the German town of Herzebrock-Clarholz. Today, the group consists of the following operating companies: the German headquarters with production in all three business activities, a metal factory each in Liptovský Mikuláš, Slovakia (Craemer Slovakia, s.r.o.) and in Attendorn, Germany (Craemer Attendorn GmbH & Co. KG) as well as a plastics injection moulding facility in Telford, Great Britain (Craemer UK Ltd). For the sales of its plastic programme, the Group also has an independent sales office each in Lesquin (Lille metropolitan area) (Craemer France Sarl), in Denmark (Craemer Nordic ApS), in Sweden (Craemer Nordic AB), in the Netherlands (Craemer Benelux BV), in Ireland (Craemer Ireland Ltd), in Florida (Craemer US Corporation) and a branch office in Poland.

In Metal Forming, Craemer is one of leading international suppliers to various industries, including automotive, fittings, large domestic appliances and heater industries – with their large-scale production of precision stamped and large-area formed parts. Metal components for the automotive sector include seat structure parts, doors panels, instrument carriers, bows, chassis parts as well as belt system parts, fittings and connecting elements for seat structures.

The focus of Plastics Processing lies in the development, production and marketing of durable logistics and waste disposal solutions. The portfolio includes plastic pallets, large load carriers, plastic containers and wheeled waste bins. Under the Palcontrol brand, Craemer offers “intelligent plastic pallets and containers” providing complete solutions based on RFID technology to further optimise logistics processes.

The tools required for production are manufactured by Craemer Group’s in-house Tool Making facility. These include progressive and transfer tools for metal production and injection moulds for plastics processing. At headquarters, a technology centre with research and development and construction serves all divisions, as well as a product development office in Delft, the Netherlands (BPO International B.V.). Today, Craemer Group is one of Europe's leading manufacturers in all their product areas and is a global market leader with their plastic pallet range.

== History ==
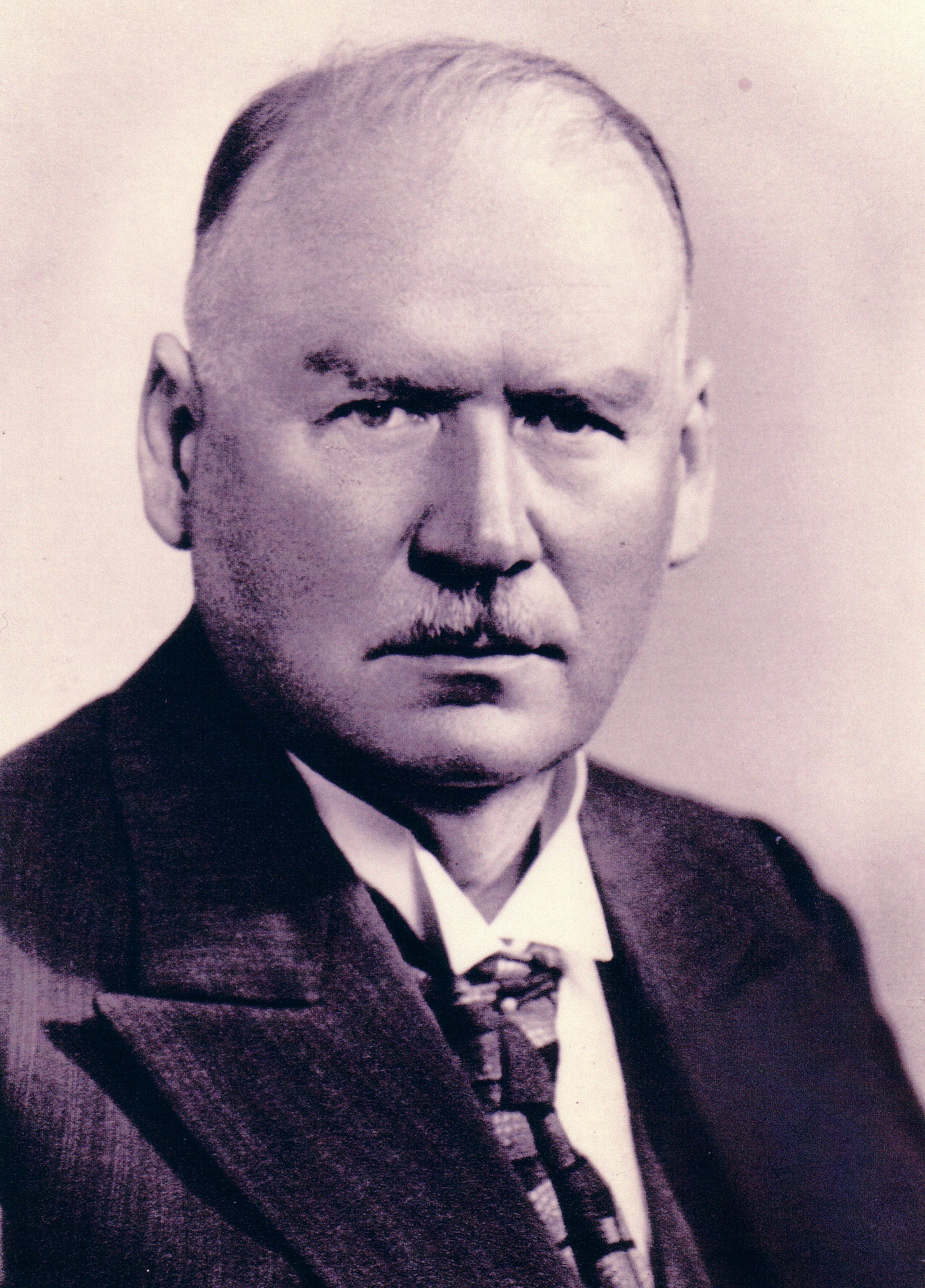
Company founder Paul Craemer

In May 1912 the engineer Paul Craemer (1874–1940) founded the Press-, Stanz- und Hammerwerke GmbH for metal forming in the German town of Herzebrock, East-Westphalia. A rolling mill was established on the new premises on the outskirts of Herzebrock in 1928.

After the Second World War, the eldest grandson of the company founder, Hans-Joachim Brandenburg, began the reconstruction of the company. In the 1950s the company was recognised as a major supplier of parts for agricultural machinery. In 1958, Craemer opened a new business activity for plastics processing and started with the injection moulding of large containers. In 1967, the company developed the worldwide first plastic pallet moulded in one shot, for which they received a patent in the same year. In the 1980s waste disposal containers were included in the plastic product range. In the business field of metal forming, 1978 marked the demolition of the hot rolling mill and thus the final change to the processing of cold rolling sheets. In the 1980s Craemer became established as an automotive supplier, manufacturing metal formed parts for cars.

In 1997, the production started in the metal plant in Slovakia. In 2001, Craemer took over the Kliko-Entsorgunssysteme GmbH (Waste Disposal Systems), opened a plastics processing plant in Telford in 2006 and founded a distribution company in the Paris metropolitan area on May 1, 2009. In 2015, Craemer took over the SKA GmbH & Co. KG, a well-established, German metal processing company in Attendorn, Sauerland Region (Olpe district).
