= Bredeck =

Part of Herzebrock-Clarholz, Germany

Coordinates: 51°56′N 8°17′E

Bredeck is a small village in the municipality Herzebrock-Clarholz, in the district of Gütersloh, North Rhine-Westphalia, Germany.
