= Burkhard Blienert =

German politician of the SPD

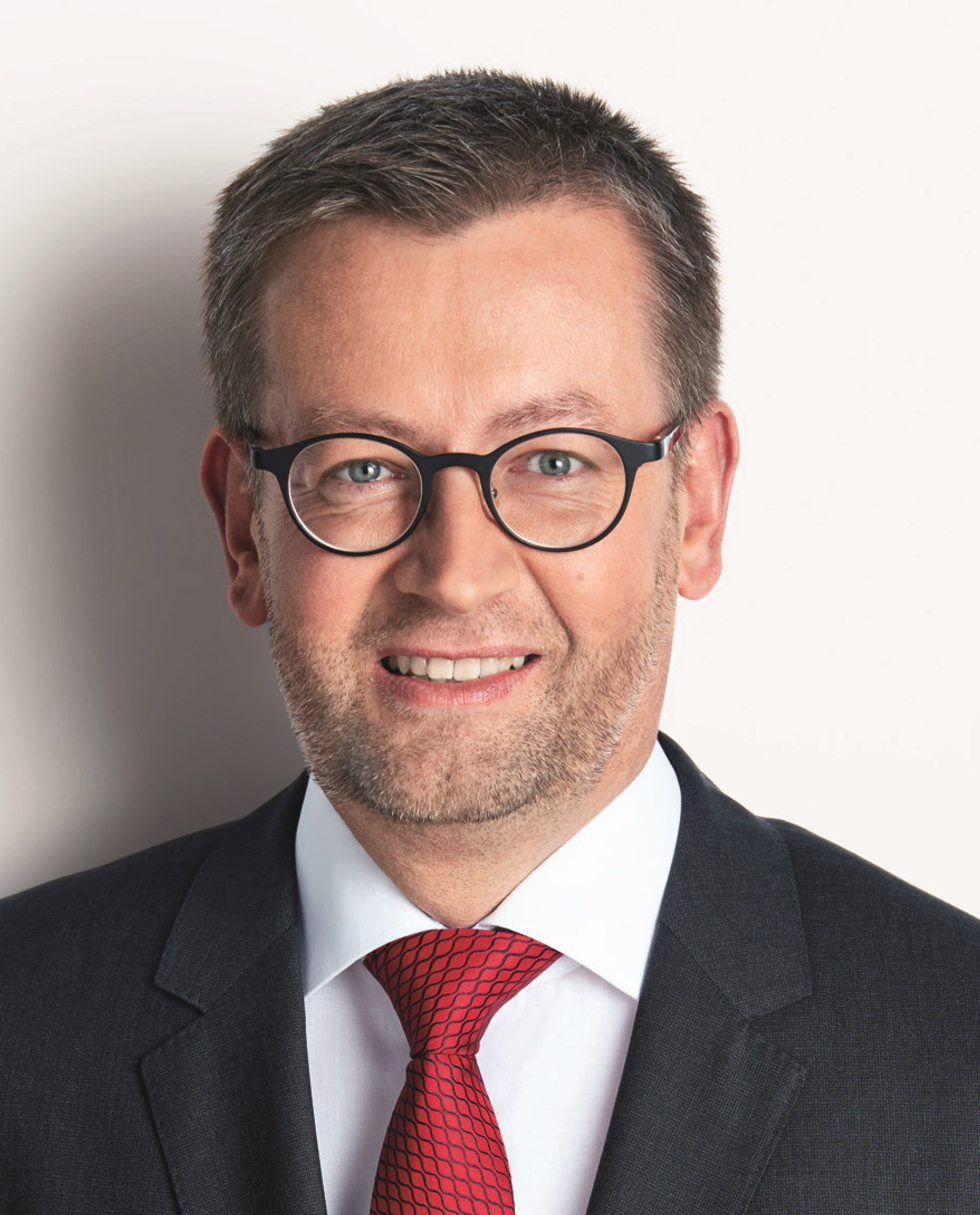
- Blienert in 2017

Member of the Bundestag
- In office 2013–2017

Personal details
- Born: 13 March 1966 (age 60) Braubach, West Germany (now Germany)
- Party: SPD
- Education: University of Münster

Burkhard Blienert (born 30 March 1966) is a German politician of the Social Democratic Party (SPD) who served as Commissioner on Narcotic Drugs at the Federal Ministry of Health in the government of Chancellor Olaf Scholz from 2022 to 2025. From 2013 to 2017 he was a member of the German Bundestag.

== Education and early career ==
Blienert was born in Braubach. After graduating from the Theodorianum in Paderborn, he did the Zivildienst (compulsory community service) at the AWO district association Paderborn. At the University of Münster, he obtained a master's degree in Politics, Modern History and Sociology in 1994. He passed his first state exam for lower secondary school in the subjects social sciences and history.

Prior to his time as a member of the Bundestag, Burkhard Blienert worked since 1992 in various functions in the SPD or their affiliated organizations. During the election campaign in 2009, he was a speaker in the office of the former SPD chairman Franz Müntefering. Between 2010 and September 2013, Blienert was a speaker for school and training, sports and petitions at the SPD parliamentary group in the state parliament of North Rhine-Westphalia.

== Political career ==
From 2002 to 2011, Blienert was Deputy District Chairman of the SPD in the district of Paderborn. In 2011, he was elected district chairman of the SPD Paderborn. Since 2008, Blienert is also a member of the SPD Regional Executive for East Westphalia-Lippe, he is also a deputy member of the SPD party convention.

For the election to the Bundestag in 2013, Blienert joined the Bundestag constituency Paderborn - Gütersloh III as a direct candidate. He moved over the state list in the 18th German Bundestag.

He was a full member of the Committee on Health and the Committee on Culture and the Media and Deputy Member of the Committee on Budgets and Committee on Foreign Policies in the eighteenth legislative session of the German Bundestag.

He focuses on health on the topics of budget, drugs and addiction as well as men's health. In the field of culture and media, he held the position of the spokesman for his political group. His other areas of specialization include heritage protection, books / publishing / literature, cultural education and the social protection of cultural and media workers.

Furthermore, Blienert was a member of the German-Polish, the German-Dutch and the German-Korean parliamentary groups.

Blienert stood as a candidate for the 19th German Bundestag, but wasn't re-elected.

On 12 January 2022, at the suggestion of Health Minister Karl Lauterbach (SPD), he was appointed Commissioner for Addiction and Drug Issues of the Federal Government. Blienert is considered an advocate of the legalization of cannabis, a project provided for in the coalition agreement of the traffic light coalition. Already in 2015, during his time as a member of the Bundestag, he was responsible for a publication of the SPD Working Group on Drug Policy, which defined "cornerstones of a social democratic drug policy" and called for an end to prohibition. On 28 May 2025, his service as Commissioner ended with the appointment of Hendrik Streeck as his successor.

== Other activities ==
Blienert is a member of the Board of Directors of Filmförderungsanstalt (Film Fostering Institute) Berlin, a member of the Radio Council and of the Economic and Financial Committee of Deutschlandradio, member of the Board of Trustees of the Federal Agency for Civic Education and Deputy Member of the Administrative Council of the German National Library.

== Personal life ==
Blienert lives in Delbrück since 1968 with interruptions. He is married and has two children.
