= Ralph Brinkhaus =

German politician (born 1968)

Ralph Brinkhaus MdB
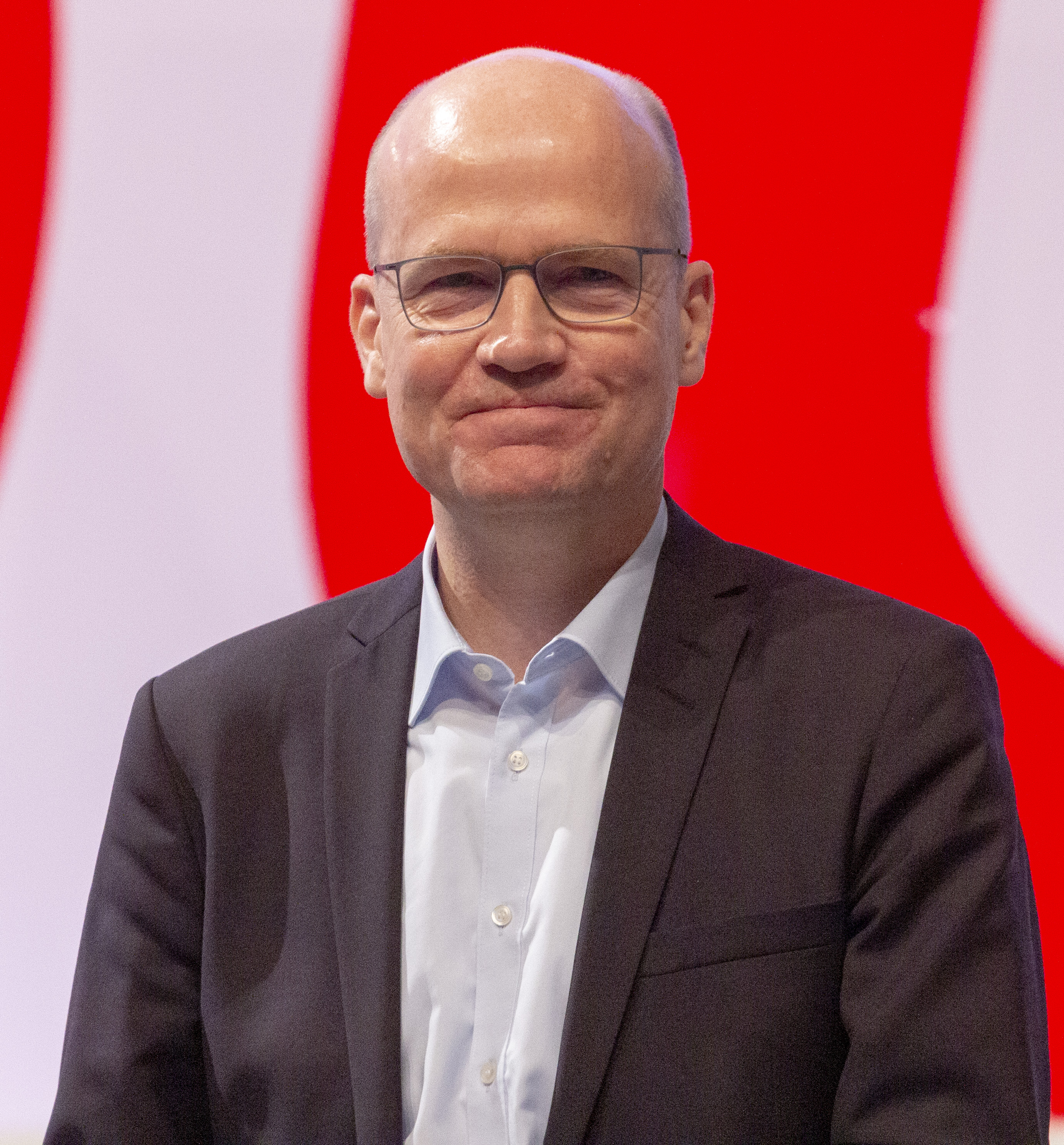
- Brinkhaus at the 2019 CDU party congress

Leader of the Opposition
- In office 8 December 2021 – 15 February 2022
- Chancellor: Olaf Scholz
- Preceded by: Alexander Gauland; Alice Weidel
- Succeeded by: Friedrich Merz

Leader of the CDU/CSU Group in the Bundestag
- In office 25 September 2018 – 15 February 2022
- First Deputy: Alexander Dobrindt
- Chief Whip: Michael Grosse-Brömer; Thorsten Frei
- Preceded by: Volker Kauder
- Succeeded by: Friedrich Merz

Member of the Bundestag for Gütersloh I
- Incumbent
- Assumed office 27 October 2009
- Preceded by: Hubert Deittert

Personal details
- Born: 15 June 1968 (age 58) Wiedenbrück, West Germany
- Party: Christian Democratic Union (1998–)
- Spouse: Elke Tombach (m. 2010)
- Education: University of Hohenheim
- Website: ralph-brinkhaus.de

Ralph Brinkhaus (born 15 June 1968) is a German politician of the Christian Democratic Union (CDU). He served as parliamentary leader of the CDU/CSU parliamentary group in the Bundestag between 2018 and 2022, and as such acted as the opposition leader between December 2021 and February 2022.

In 2009, he was directly elected to the German Bundestag in the Constituency Gütersloh I and has been a member of the Bundestag ever since. He is Chairman of the regional CDU in Ostwestfalen-Lippe (OWL) and used to be the Chairman of the local CDU in Gütersloh until March 2019.

Since May 2025, Brinkhaus holds the position as Chairman of the Working Group of Digital and State Modernisation of the CDU/CSU parliamentary group at the German Bundestag.

== Education and early career ==
Brinkhaus was born on 15 June 1968 in Wiedenbrück, North Rhine-Westphalia, and grew up in Rietberg. After completing vocational training at Bosch and military services at Field Marshal Rommel Barracks, Augustdorf, he studied economics at the University of Hohenheim. He holds a degree in economics and is a certified tax advisor.

Early in his career, Brinkhaus worked at Deloitte in Hannover, Babcock Borsig in Oberhausen, as well as at Medion in Essen and Mülheim. In 2004, he set himself down as independent tax advisor in Gütersloh.

== Political career ==
Brinkhaus was elected member of the Gütersloh city council in 2004, a position he held until 2012. From 2007 to 2009, he was the party's group leader at that council. In 2004, he also became a member of the district CDU executive committee.

Brinkhaus has been a member of the German Bundestag since the 2009 German federal elections, succeeding Hubert Deittert. From 2009 until 2013, he served on the Finance Committee, where he was his parliamentary group’s rapporteur on banks and insurances. Between 2014 and 2018, he was deputy chairman of the CDU/CSU parliamentary group at the German Bundestag. In this capacity, he was the group's main spokesman for budgetary, financial and municipal issues.

Brinkhaus was elected CDU/CSU parliamentary group leader on 25 September 2018, with 125 votes from the parliamentary group members against incumbent Volker Kauder's 112 votes. Brinkhaus subsequently led the group with his co-chairman from CSU, Alexander Dobrindt, until early 2022.

Brinkhaus has been a member of the Committee on European Affairs and the Parliamentary Advisory Council on Sustainable Development between 2022 and 2025.

Since May 2025, he has been Chairman of the CDU/CSU's Working Group on Digitalisation and State Modernisation at the German Bundestag.

In addition to his committee assignments, Brinkhaus chaired the German-Indian Parliamentary Friendship Group from 2014 until 2017, and from 2021 until 2025. He has further been a member of the Parliamentary Advisory Council on Sustainable Development since the last electoral period.

From 2016 to 2021, Brinkhaus also served as the deputy head of the CDU in North Rhine-Westphalia, Germany’s most populous state, under the leadership of chairman Armin Laschet. In the negotiations to form a coalition government of the CDU and Green Party under Laschet following the 2017 state elections, he was part of his party’s delegation in the Working Group on Economic Affairs, Infrastructure und Financial Policy. In the negotiations to form a coalition government under the leadership of Chancellor Angela Merkel following the 2017 federal elections, Brinkhaus was also part of the CDU delegation.

== Political positions ==
Brinkhaus advocates for a comprehensive modernisation of the state. In 2024, he published a document titled 100 Proposals for the Neustaat, in which he detailed how he intends to restructure the state and make it future-proof.

Brinkhaus is considered conservative and, within his parliamentary group, is seen as "calm and factual". During the Eurozone crisis, he was a critic of "overly generous" financial aid.

He advocated for engaging "with those who have turned away from us" and for taking greater care than before of protest voters - specifically those from the AfD.

In votes, Brinkhaus typically voted in line with the coalition. In 2018, he stated that redistribution was necessary to prevent societal disparities from growing too large. In relation to social policy, Brinkhaus remarked in 2018 that social cohesion could not be achieved through increased welfare benefits ("We cannot fill the gaps in society with public funds"). Brinkhaus argues that "the particularly wealthy (...) are already being asked to pay in Germany." He views investment via the issuance of government bonds with scepticism.

Brinkhaus is also involved with the Stephanus Circle, an interdenominational discussion forum within the CDU/CSU parliamentary group that advocates for tolerance and religious freedom, and, according to its own statements, aims to give persecuted Christians around the world a voice within the parliamentary group.

== Personal life ==
Since 2010, Brinkhaus has been married to fellow economist and former American Express manager Elke Tombach. He supports the 1. FC Köln football club.

Preceded by Volker Kauder	Chairman of the CDU/CSU Parliamentary Group; 2018–2022	Succeeded by Friedrich Merz
