= Pickert =

Potato dish

Heap of several Pickerts
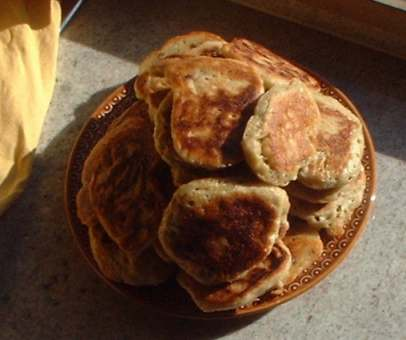
- Type: Dumpling
- Place of origin: Germany
- Region or state: Lippe and Westphalia
- Main ingredients: Potatoes, flour, milk, eggs, usually raisins, yeast, salt, sugar, oil

A pickert (German: [ˈpɪkɐt]) is a flat, fried or baked potato dish from Westphalia, Germany. It can be considered a kind of flattened dumpling or very nourishing pancake. It comes as a round Pfannenpickert the size of a pan, a rectangular Kastenpickert, or a palm-sized regular Pickert. The name is derived from Low German picken, pecken ("to stick something onto something else").

The main ingredients are grated potatoes, flour, milk, eggs, and (usually) raisins, with a little yeast, salt and sugar, and oil for the baking. Three big potatoes produce 10–15 palm-sized pickerts, enough for 4–5 people.

Pickerts are a specialty of the district of Lippe, where they developed from a traditional meal for the poorer people. In former times, Pickert was eaten as breakfast or lunch by poor farmers, being a cheap and very nourishing dish, as would be required of food for a day's work in the fields. They are now served spread with sugar beet syrup, butter or (plum) jam, or leberwurst.

A related dish, Lappenpickert, is found in the regions west of Lippe, towards Münster and the Ruhr Area. It does not usually contain raisins and yeast, but may have a dash of sweet cream added. Lappenpickert is usually baked in rather thin pancakes on a griddle greased with a side of lard, and eaten with the same spreads as Pickerts from Lippe, or with smoked fish or cold cuts.

== See also ==
- Rösti
