= Gerhard Wächter =

German politician (1946–2022)

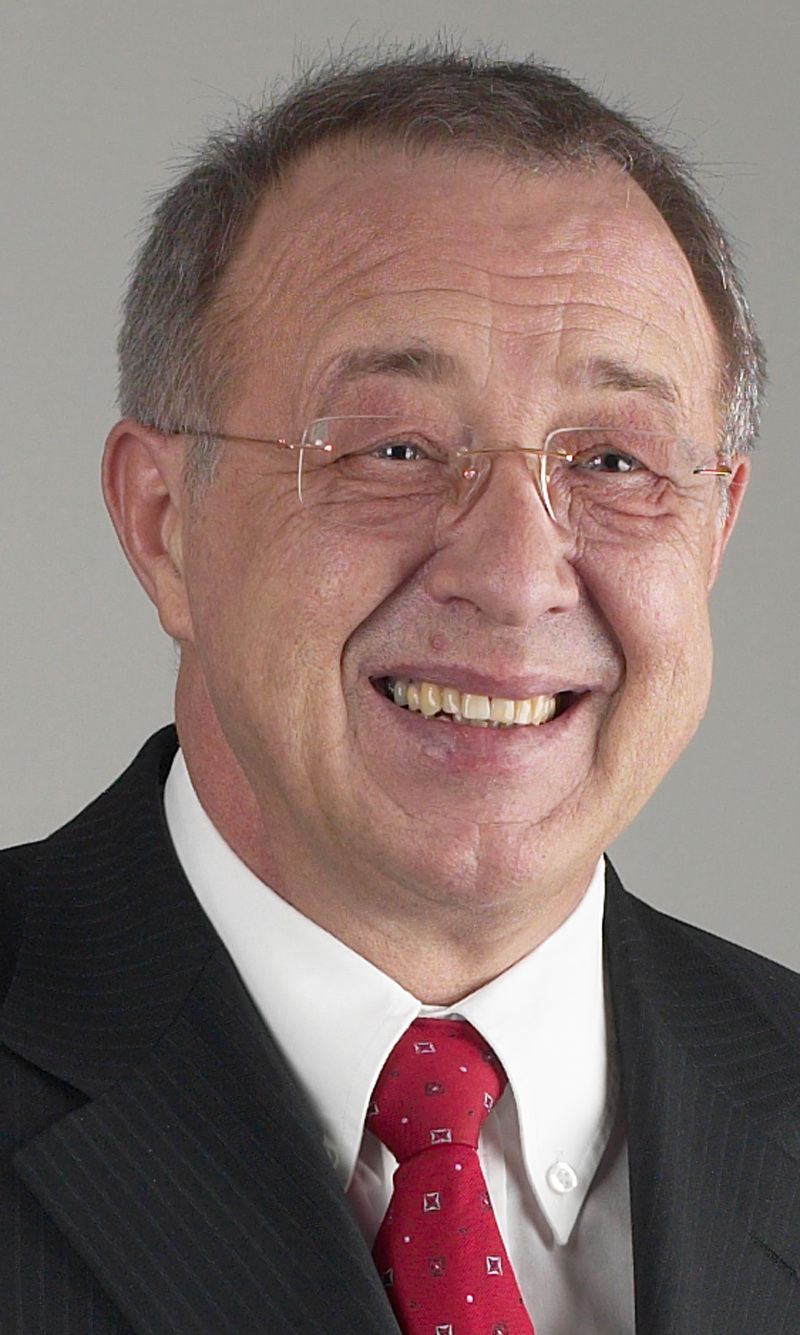
- Wächter in 2006

Member of the Bundestag
- In office 2002–2009
- Constituency: Paderborn

Member of the Landtag of North Rhine-Westphalia
- In office 1990–2002

Personal details
- Born: 11 August 1946 Helmern, Bad Wünnenberg, Allied-occupied Germany
- Died: 19 February 2022 (aged 75)
- Party: CDU
- Education: University of Münster

Gerhard Wächter (11 August 1946 – 19 February 2022) was a German politician. A member of the Christian Democratic Union of Germany, he served in the Bundestag from 2002 to 2009. He died on 19 February 2022, at the age of 75.
