= Thorsten Klute =

German politician (born 1974)

Member of the Landtag of North Rhine-Westphalia
- Incumbent
- Assumed office 1 June 2022
- Preceded by: Georg Fortmeier
- Constituency: Gütersloh I – Bielefeld III

Personal details
- Born: 31 January 1974 (age 52)
- Party: Social Democratic Party (since 1990)

Thorsten Klute (born 31 January 1974) is a German politician serving as a member of the Landtag of North Rhine-Westphalia since 2022. From 2004 to 2013, he served as mayor of Versmold.
