= Christian Haase =

German politician

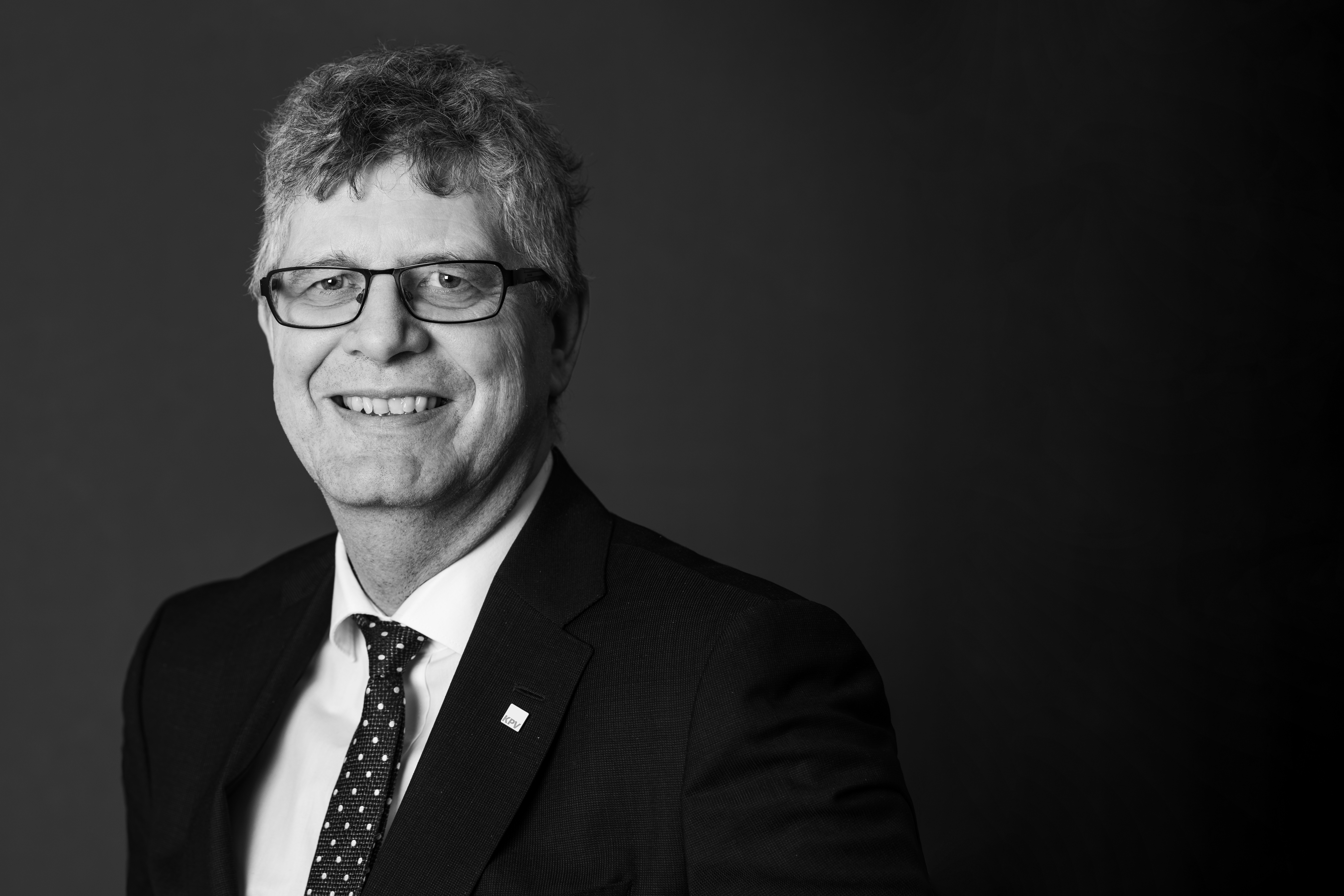
- Haase in 2020

Member of the Bundestag
- Incumbent
- Assumed office 2013

Personal details
- Born: 6 May 1966 (age 60) Höxter, West Germany (now Germany)
- Party: CDU

Christian Haase (born 6 May 1966) is a German politician of the Christian Democratic Union (CDU) who has been serving as a member of the Bundestag from the state of North Rhine-Westphalia since 2013.

== Political career ==
Haase first became a member of the Bundestag in the 2013 German federal election, representing the Höxter and Lippe districts.

In parliament, Haase is a member of the Budget Committee and its Subcommittee on European Affairs. Since the 2021 elections, he has been serving as his parliamentary group’s spokesperson for the national budget. In 2022, he also joined the parliamentary body charged with overseeing a 100 billion euro special fund to strengthen Germany’s armed forces. Since 2025, he has been a member of the so-called Confidential Committee (Vertrauensgremium) of the Budget Committee, which provides budgetary supervision for Germany's three intelligence services, BND, BfV and MAD.

In addition to his committee assignments, Haase chairs the German-Egyptian Parliamentary Friendship Group and is a member of the German Parliamentary Friendship Group for Relations with the Northern Adriatic States.

== Political positions ==
In June 2017, Haase voted against Germany's introduction of same-sex marriage.

Ahead of the Christian Democrats’ leadership election in 2018, Haase publicly endorsed Annegret Kramp-Karrenbauer to succeed Angela Merkel as the party’s chair.
