= Schlangen =

- Municipality
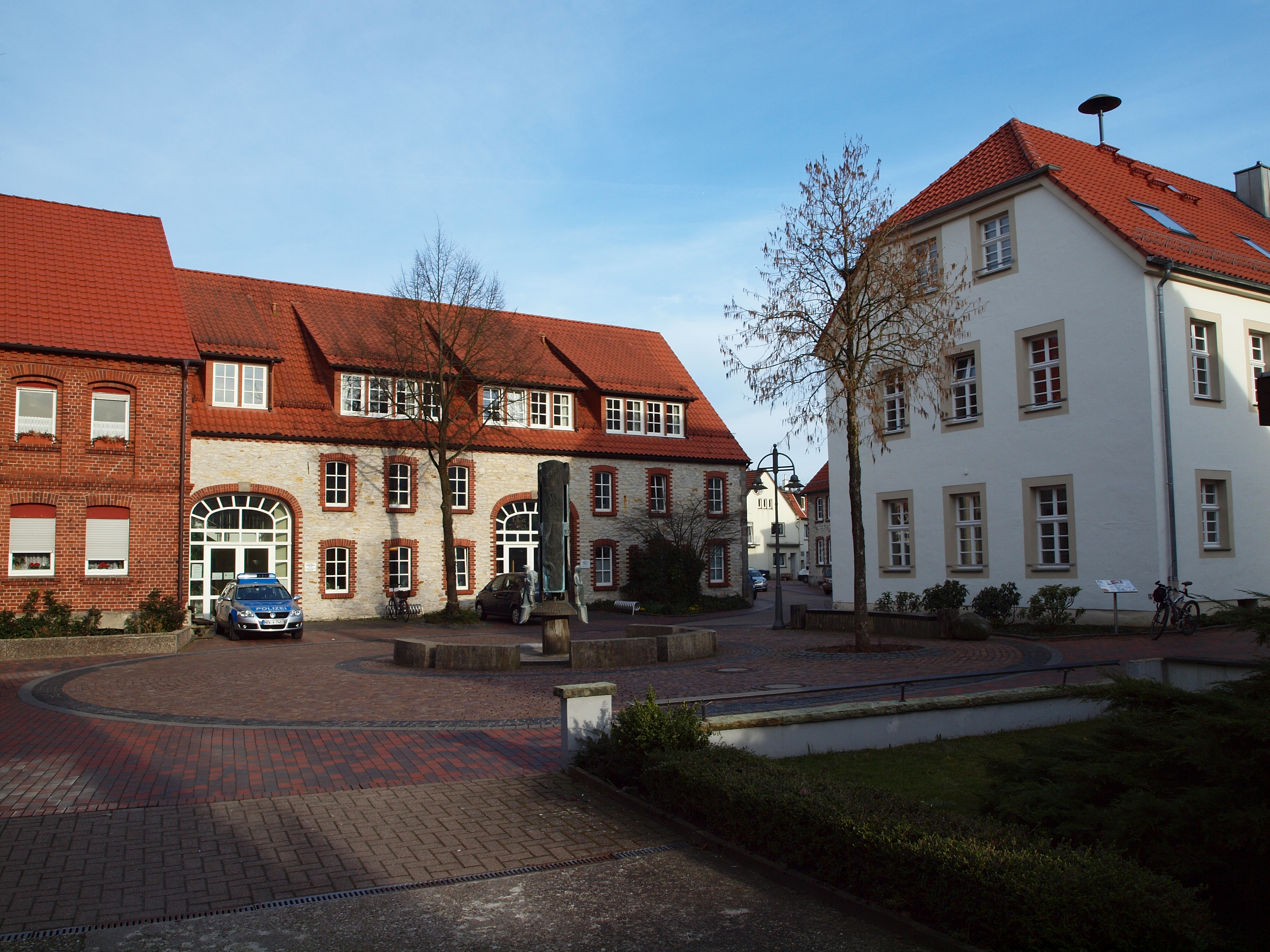
- Village place in central Schlangen with the municipal office and police station

- Coat of arms

- Location of Schlangen within Lippe district
- Interactive map of Schlangen
- Location within Germany Location within North Rhine-Westphalia
- Coordinates: 51°49′00″N 08°49′59″E
- Country: Germany
- State: North Rhine-Westphalia
- Admin. region: Detmold
- District: Lippe

Government
  - Mayor (2020–25): Marcus Püster (CDU)

Area
  - Total: 75.97 km^{2} (29.33 sq mi)
- Elevation: 169 m (554 ft)

Population (2025-12-31)
  - Total: 9,249
  - Density: 121.7/km^{2} (315.3/sq mi)
- Time zone: UTC+01:00 (CET)
  - Summer (DST): UTC+02:00 (CEST)
- Postal codes: 33189
- Dialling codes: 05252
- Vehicle registration: LIP
- Website: www.schlangen-online.de

Schlangen (German pronunciation: [ˈʃlaŋən]) is a municipality in the Lippe district of North Rhine-Westphalia, Germany. Schlangen has about 9,200 inhabitants as of 2025 and enjoys relative prosperity. Located a few kilometers away from Detmold, the municipality stretches from the edge of the Senne to the southern slopes of the Teutoburg Forest.

== Population ==
Historical population

Year	Pop.	±% p.a.
1965	6,197	—
1970	6,939	+2.29%
1975	7,166	+0.65%
1980	7,435	+0.74%
1985	7,362	−0.20%
1990	7,635	+0.73%
1995	8,194	+1.42%

Year	Pop.	±% p.a.
2000	8,845	+1.54%
2005	9,080	+0.53%
2010	8,770	−0.69%
2015	9,144	+0.84%
2020	9,254	+0.24%
2025	9,249	−0.01%

Source: Landesdatabank Nordrhein-Westfalen

== Politics ==
The town council of Schlangen consists of 26 members:

Parties and voter communities		% 2014	seats 2014
CDU	Christian Democratic Union of Germany	36,68	10
SPD	Social Democratic Party of Germany	43,80	11
FDP	Free Democratic Party (Germany)	7,14	2
GRÜNE	Alliance '90/The Greens	12,38	3
Total		100,0	26
Poll in %		63,1	

(conditions: Local election 2014)

== Sister cities ==
The following cities are twinned with Schlangen:

- Viitasaari, Central Finland, since 1999
