= Maria Niggemeyer =

German politician (1888–1968)

Member of the Bundestag
- In office 7 September 1949 – 15 October 1961

Personal details
- Born: 18 May 1888
- Died: 27 September 1968 (aged 80)
- Party: CDU

Maria Niggemeyer (May 18, 1888 – September 27, 1968) was a German politician of the Christian Democratic Union (CDU) and former member of the German Bundestag.

== Life ==
Niggemeyer was a member of the Economic Council of Bizone in 1948/49. She was a member of the German Bundestag from its first election in 1949 to 1961. From 1949 to 1957 she represented the constituency Paderborn - Wiedenbrück and in 1957 she entered parliament via the state list of the CDU North Rhine-Westphalia. From 13 February 1953 to 1957, she was chairman of the Bundestag committee for public welfare issues.

== Literature ==
Herbst, Ludolf; Jahn, Bruno (2002). Vierhaus, Rudolf (ed.). Biographisches Handbuch der Mitglieder des Deutschen Bundestages. 1949–2002 [Biographical Handbook of the Members of the German Bundestag. 1949–2002] (in German). München: De Gruyter - De Gruyter Saur. p. 1715. ISBN 978-3-11-184511-1.
