= Lügde =

- Town
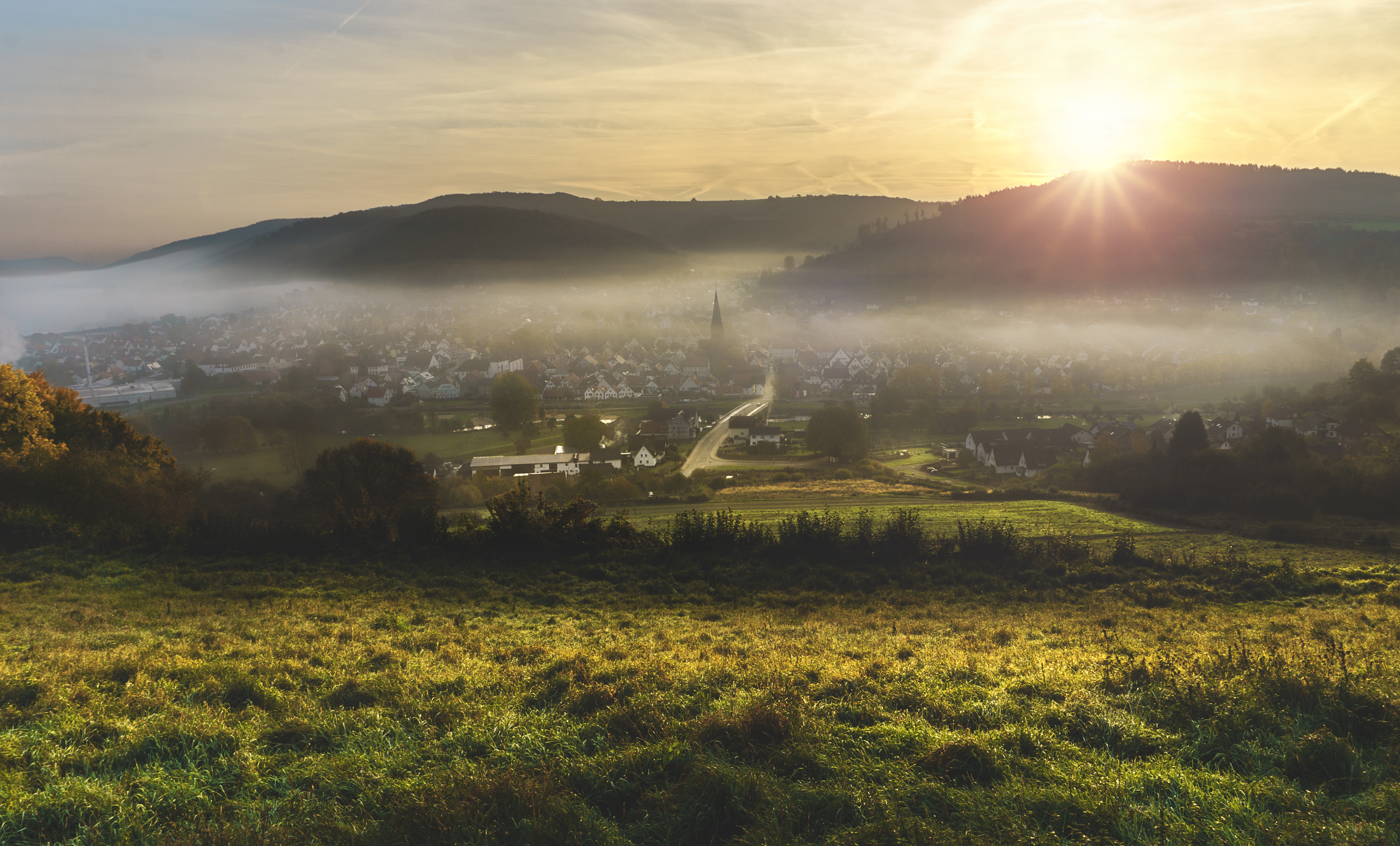

- Coat of arms

- Location of Lügde within Lippe district
- Interactive map of Lügde
- Location within Germany Location within North Rhine-Westphalia
- Coordinates: 51°57′00″N 09°15′00″E
- Country: Germany
- State: North Rhine-Westphalia
- Admin. region: Detmold
- District: Lippe

Government
  - Mayor (2020–25): Torben Blome (SPD)

Area
  - Total: 88.64 km^{2} (34.22 sq mi)
- Elevation: 105 m (344 ft)

Population (2025-12-31)
  - Total: 9,080
  - Density: 102/km^{2} (265/sq mi)
- Time zone: UTC+01:00 (CET)
  - Summer (DST): UTC+02:00 (CEST)
- Postal codes: 32668–32676
- Dialling codes: 05281, 05283
- Vehicle registration: LIP
- Website: luegde.de

Lügde (German pronunciation: [ˈlʏçtə]) is a town in the Lippe district of North Rhine-Westphalia, Germany, with c. 9,100 inhabitants (2025).

The first written mention of Lügde appears in 784, in the annals of the Frankish Empire, when Charlemagne visited the village during the Saxon Wars. During these wars Charlemagne celebrated his first Christmas in Saxony in Lügde, and the site then became the location of the first church to be built in Saxony. The gothic church, dedicated to Saint Kilian, was rebuilt in the 12th century and still stands today. The church is known as the Kilians-Kirche.

In 2019 Lügde made national news as the site of a series of child rapes on a campground; investigators estimate 1,000 child rapes were committed over the course of 10 years.

== Population ==
Historical population

Year	Pop.	±% p.a.
1965	10,288	—
1970	10,674	+0.74%
1975	11,005	+0.61%
1980	11,023	+0.03%
1985	10,884	−0.25%
1990	11,248	+0.66%
1995	12,003	+1.31%

Year	Pop.	±% p.a.
2000	11,718	−0.48%
2005	11,094	−1.09%
2010	10,400	−1.28%
2015	9,751	−1.28%
2020	9,235	−1.08%
2025	9,080	−0.34%

Source: Landesdatabank Nordrhein-Westfalen

== Climate ==
Climate data for Lügde (1991–2020 normals)
Month	Jan	Feb	Mar	Apr	May	Jun	Jul	Aug	Sep	Oct	Nov	Dec	Year
Mean daily maximum °C (°F)	3.1 (37.6)	4.1 (39.4)	8.5 (47.3)	13.9 (57.0)	17.2 (63.0)	20.7 (69.3)	22.8 (73.0)	22.5 (72.5)	18.5 (65.3)	13.0 (55.4)	7.7 (45.9)	4.2 (39.6)	13.1 (55.6)
Daily mean °C (°F)	0.9 (33.6)	1.4 (34.5)	4.6 (40.3)	8.9 (48.0)	12.3 (54.1)	15.5 (59.9)	17.4 (63.3)	17.1 (62.8)	13.5 (56.3)	9.5 (49.1)	5.4 (41.7)	2.1 (35.8)	9.2 (48.6)
Mean daily minimum °C (°F)	−1.5 (29.3)	−1.5 (29.3)	0.7 (33.3)	3.6 (38.5)	6.8 (44.2)	10.3 (50.5)	12.0 (53.6)	12.1 (53.8)	9.0 (48.2)	6.1 (43.0)	2.9 (37.2)	−0.1 (31.8)	5.2 (41.4)
Average precipitation mm (inches)	82.3 (3.24)	56.9 (2.24)	53.5 (2.11)	38.0 (1.50)	69.9 (2.75)	72.9 (2.87)	83.9 (3.30)	83.3 (3.28)	62.3 (2.45)	69.7 (2.74)	66.1 (2.60)	73.8 (2.91)	819.1 (32.25)
Average precipitation days (≥ 1.0 mm)	19.4	16.3	15.9	12.2	15.2	14.5	16.6	16.5	14.3	16.7	17.9	20.5	198.2
Average relative humidity (%)	88.0	84.5	78.6	71.8	74.6	76.5	74.9	77.0	82.1	86.8	89.7	89.6	81.2
Mean monthly sunshine hours	40.2	68.2	121.6	180.9	194.0	204.6	209.4	184.9	150.2	94.3	45.8	33.3	1,498.1
Source: World Meteorological Organisation
