= Hubert Deittert =

German politician (1941–2020)

Member of the Bundestag
- In office 1994–2009

Personal details
- Born: 21 March 1941 Rietberg, Westphalia, Prussia, Germany
- Died: 19 April 2020 (aged 79)
- Party: CDU

Hubert Deittert (21 March 1941 – 19 April 2020) was a German politician and member of Christian Democratic Union (CDU) in the Bundestag from 1994 until 2009. He was born in Rietberg.
