= Herzebrock-Clarholz =

- Municipality
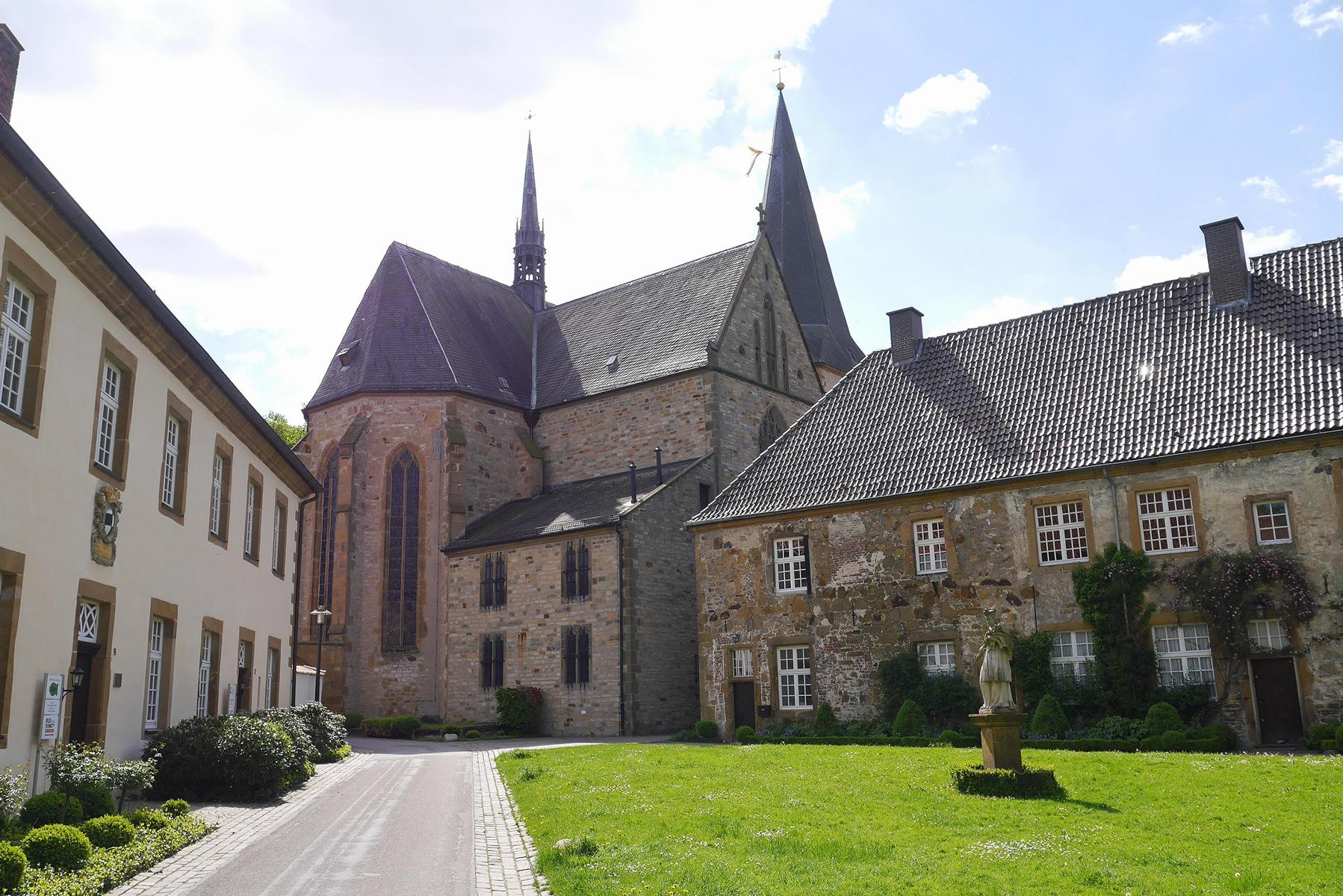
- Herzebrock Monastery

- Flag Coat of arms

- Location of Herzebrock-Clarholz within Gütersloh district
- Interactive map of Herzebrock-Clarholz
- Location within Germany Location within North Rhine-Westphalia
- Coordinates: 51°53′00″N 08°14′00″E
- Country: Germany
- State: North Rhine-Westphalia
- Admin. region: Detmold
- District: Gütersloh
- Subdivisions: 2

Government
  - Mayor (2020–25): Marco Diethelm (CDU)

Area
  - Total: 79.28 km^{2} (30.61 sq mi)
- Elevation: 62–80 m (203–262 ft)

Population (2025-12-31)
  - Total: 16,337
  - Density: 206.1/km^{2} (533.7/sq mi)
- Time zone: UTC+01:00 (CET)
  - Summer (DST): UTC+02:00 (CEST)
- Postal codes: 33442
- Dialling codes: 05245
- Vehicle registration: GT
- Website: www.herzebrock-clarholz.de

Herzebrock-Clarholz (German pronunciation: [ˈhɛʁtsəbʁɔk ˈklaːɐ̯hɔlts]) is a town in the district of Gütersloh in the state of North Rhine-Westphalia, Germany. It is located approximately 10 km west of Gütersloh.

== Adjacent towns ==
- Bredeck
- Harsewinkel
- Gütersloh
- Rheda-Wiedenbrück
- Oelde
- Beelen

== Population ==
Historical population

Year	Pop.	±% p.a.
1965	10,551	—
1970	11,319	+1.42%
1975	12,054	+1.27%
1980	12,782	+1.18%
1985	12,691	−0.14%
1990	13,351	+1.02%
1995	14,898	+2.22%

Year	Pop.	±% p.a.
2000	15,795	+1.18%
2005	16,175	+0.48%
2010	16,013	−0.20%
2015	15,965	−0.06%
2020	16,095	+0.16%
2025	16,337	+0.30%

Source: Landesdatabank Nordrhein-Westfalen

== Twinning ==
Herzebrock-Clarholz is twinned with:

- Steenwijkerland, Netherlands
- Le Chambon-Feugerolles, France

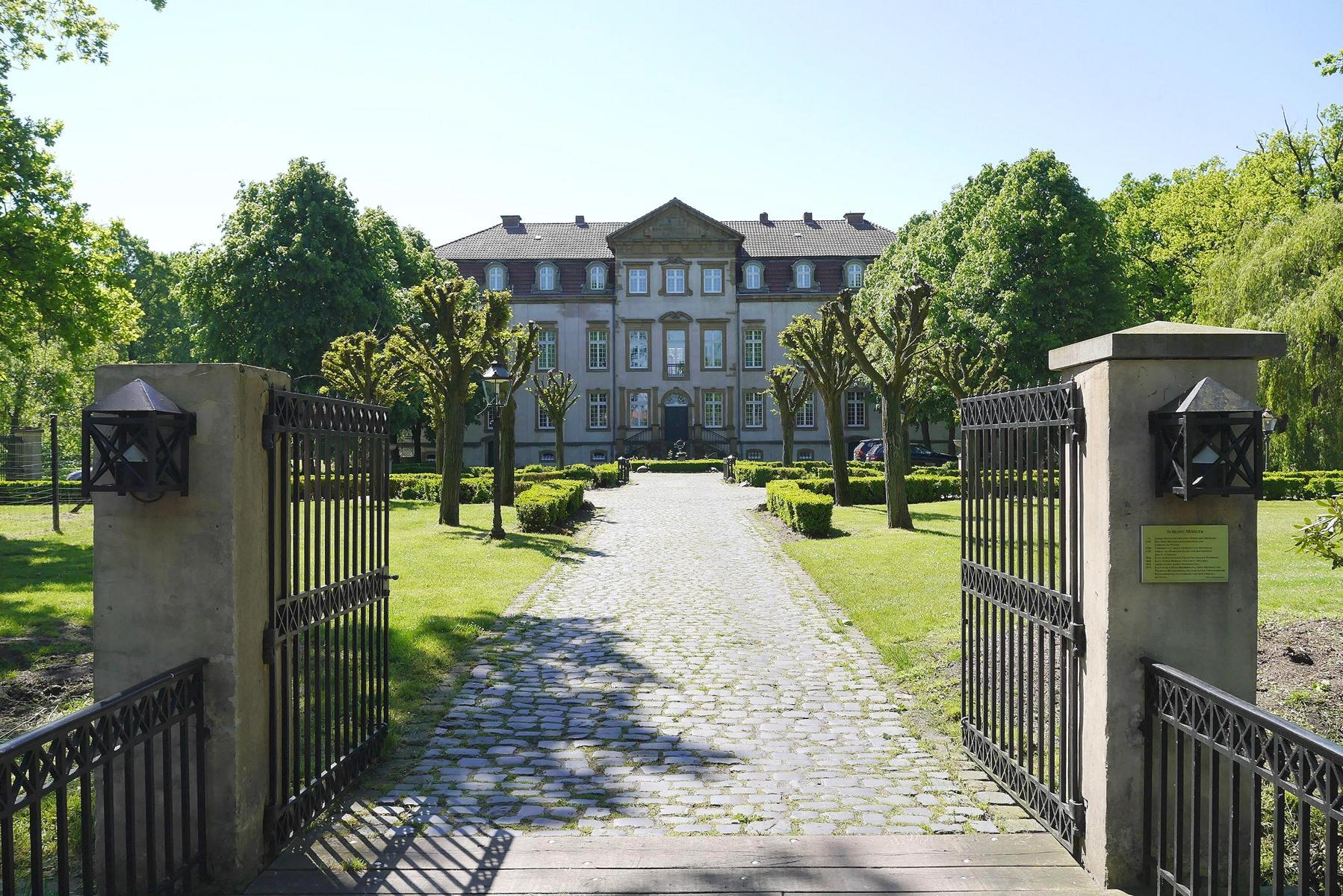
Portal (gate) of Schloss Möhler in Herzebrock-Clarholz

== People ==
- Kaspar von Zumbusch (1830–1915), sculptor
- Diana Amft (born 1975), actress

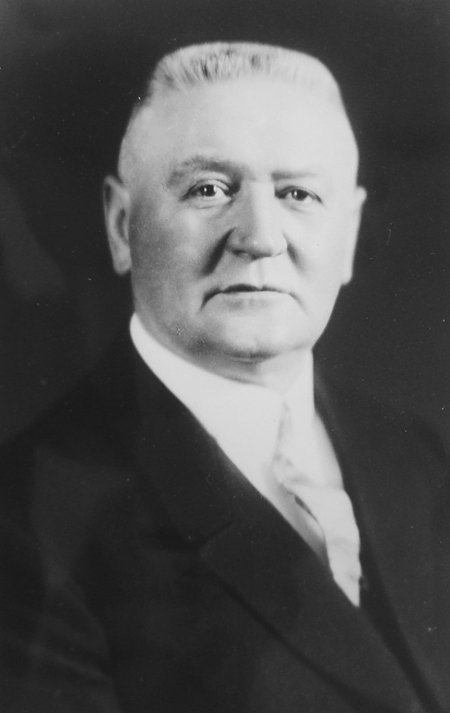
Carl Miele

- Carl Miele (1869-1938), German entrepreneur
