= Schloß Holte-Stukenbrock =

- Town
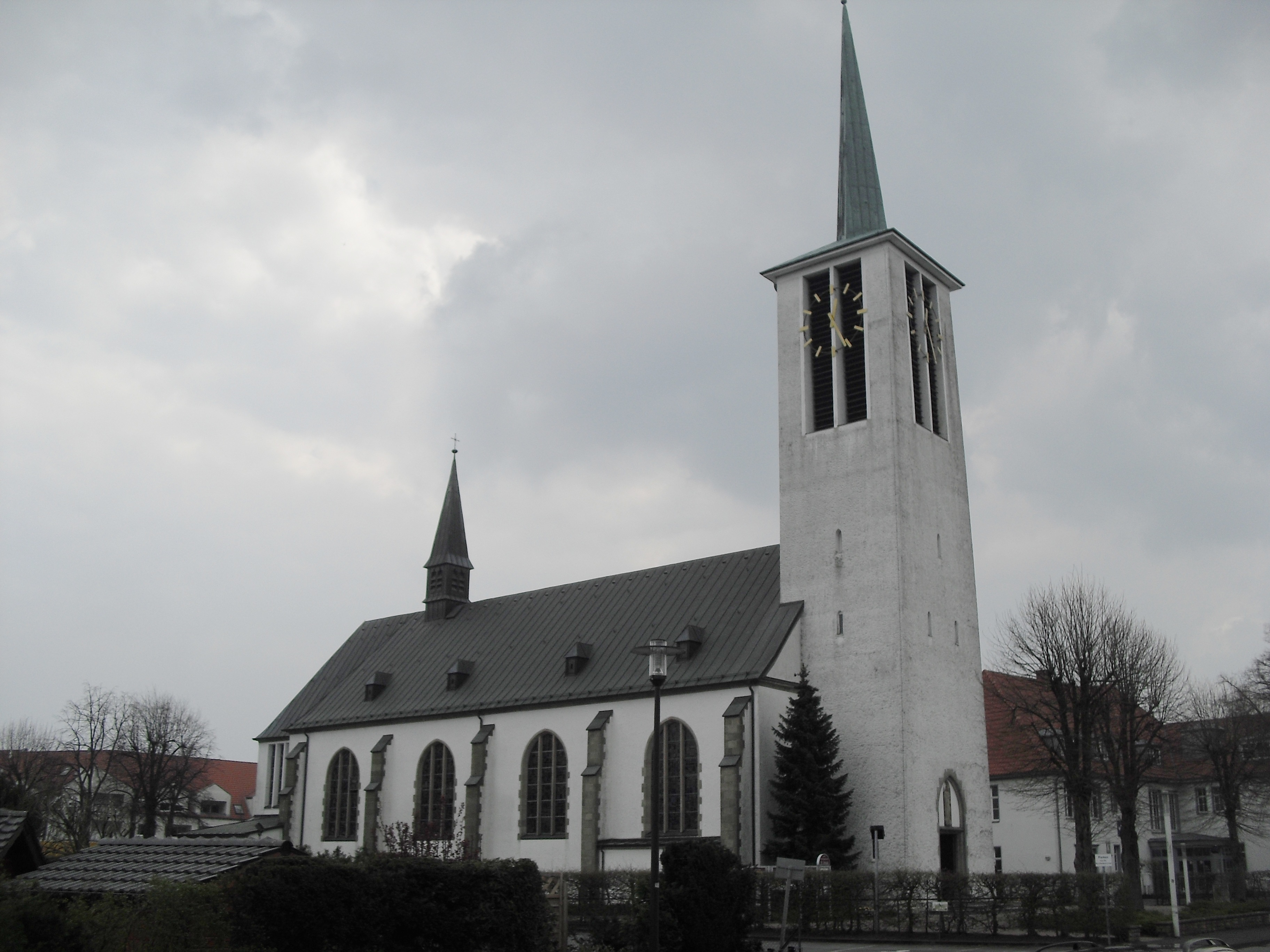
- St. Ursula Church in Schloß Holte

- Flag Coat of arms

- Location of Schloß Holte-Stukenbrock within Gütersloh district
- Interactive map of Schloß Holte-Stukenbrock
- Location within Germany Location within North Rhine-Westphalia
- Coordinates: 51°53′N 8°37′E
- Country: Germany
- State: North Rhine-Westphalia
- Admin. region: Detmold
- District: Gütersloh
- Subdivisions: 5

Government
  - Mayor (2020–25): Hubert Erichlandwehr (CDU)

Area
  - Total: 67.52 km^{2} (26.07 sq mi)
- Elevation: 140 m (460 ft)

Population (2025-12-31)
  - Total: 26,297
  - Density: 389.5/km^{2} (1,009/sq mi)
- Time zone: UTC+01:00 (CET)
  - Summer (DST): UTC+02:00 (CEST)
- Postal codes: 33758
- Dialling codes: 05207
- Vehicle registration: GT
- Website: www.schlossholtestukenbrock.de

Schloß Holte-Stukenbrock (German pronunciation: [ʃlɔs ˈhɔltə ˈʃtʊkn̩ˌbʁɔk]) is a town in the district of Gütersloh in the state of North Rhine-Westphalia, Germany. It is located near the Eggegebirge, approx. 15 km east of Gütersloh and 15 km south-east of Bielefeld. It is the source of the river Ems. In 2004, the town celebrated its 850th anniversary.

== Population ==
Historical population

Year	Pop.	±% p.a.
1965	15,007	—
1970	16,267	+1.63%
1975	18,749	+2.88%
1980	20,422	+1.72%
1985	20,982	+0.54%
1990	21,402	+0.40%
1995	23,248	+1.67%

Year	Pop.	±% p.a.
2000	25,562	+1.92%
2005	26,016	+0.35%
2010	26,156	+0.11%
2015	27,092	+0.71%
2020	26,943	−0.11%
2025	26,297	−0.48%

Source: Landesdatabank Nordrhein-Westfalen
