= Gütersloh (district) =

Coordinates: 51°55′N 8°20′E

- District
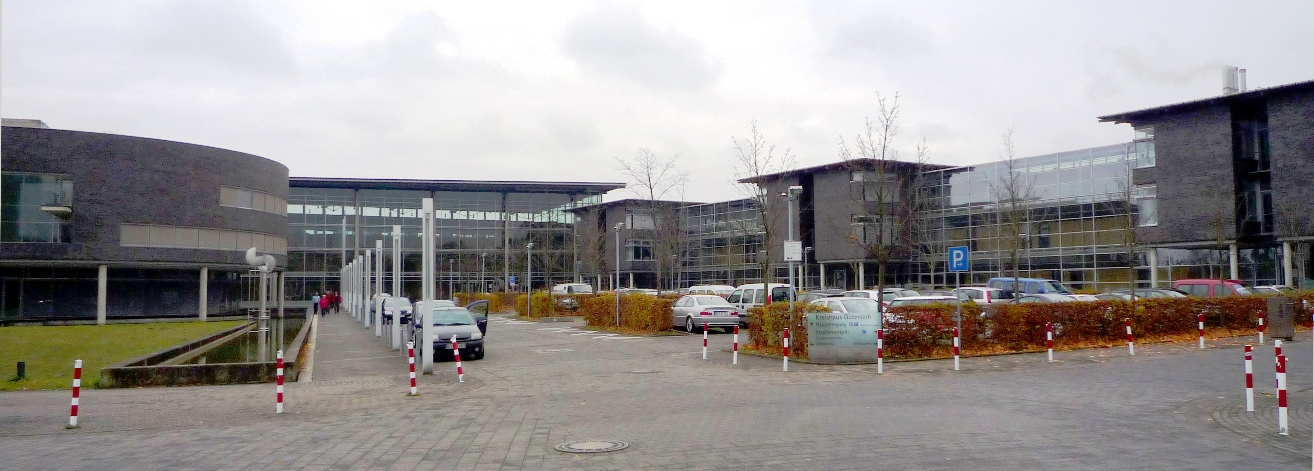
- Kreishaus (District Office)

- Flag Coat of arms
- Country: Germany
- State: North Rhine-Westphalia
- Adm. region: Detmold
- Capital: Gütersloh

Government
  - District admin. (2020–25): Sven-Georg Adenauer (CDU)

Area
  - Total: 969.21 km^{2} (374.21 sq mi)

Population (31 December 2025)
  - Total: 362,443
  - Density: 373.96/km^{2} (968.54/sq mi)
- Time zone: UTC+01:00 (CET)
  - Summer (DST): UTC+02:00 (CEST)
- Vehicle registration: GT
- Website: http://www.kreis-guetersloh.de

Gütersloh (German pronunciation: [ˈɡyːtɐsloː]) is a Kreis (district) in the north-east of North Rhine-Westphalia, Germany. Neighboring districts are Osnabrück, Herford, district-free Bielefeld, Lippe, Paderborn, Soest and Warendorf.

== History ==
It was created in 1973 in the reorganization of the districts in North Rhine-Westphalia, when the previous districts of Halle and Wiedenbrück were merged. Also the districts Bielefeld, Paderborn, Beckum und Warendorf had to cede parts of their area to the newly formed district. The precursor districts were created in 1816 after the new Prussian province of Westphalia was established.

Today, the district Gütersloh has one of Germany's largest exile communities of Assyrians.

== Geography ==
The east of the district is covered by the Teutoburg Forest, which also contains the highest elevation of the district, the Hengeberg (316m). In the west there is the source of the Ems river. The Ems valley also contains the lowest point of the district, near Harsewinkel with 56m.

== Coat of arms ==
The coat of arms was adopted with the creation of the district in 1973 by combining the symbols from the arms of the previous districts Halle and Rheda-Wiedenbrück. The three elements derive from the medieval counties in the area now covered by the district. The golden eagle in the bottom of the coat comes from the duchy of Rietberg. The wheel in the middle derives from the sign of the city Osnabrück, which owned the Amt Reckenberg. The chevrons in the top part are the symbol of the duchy of Ravensberg.

== Towns and municipalities ==
Clickable map of towns and municipalities in the district

Towns
Municipalities
1. Borgholzhausen
2. Gütersloh
3. Halle (Westf.)
4. Harsewinkel
5. Rheda-Wiedenbrück
6. Rietberg
7. Schloß Holte-Stukenbrock
8. Verl
9. Versmold
10. Werther (Westf.)
1. Herzebrock-Clarholz
2. Langenberg
3. Steinhagen

== Economy ==
Some important companies are located in the district of Guetersloh:

- Beckhoff Automation Technology
- Bertelsmann Media
- Claas Combine harvesters
- Gerry Weber Fashion
- Miele Consumer electronic goods
- Nobilia International Kitchens
- Storck Candies
- Telefonica Internet Services
- Tönnies Meat Processors
