= Kiel (electoral district) =

Federal electoral district of Germany

5 Kiel
- Electoral district for the Bundestag
- Kiel in 2025
- State: Schleswig-Holstein
- Population: 268,800 (2019)
- Electorate: 202,482 (2021)
- Major settlements: Kiel
- Area: 143.0 km^{2}

Current electoral district
- Created: 1949
- Party: Alliance 90/The Greens
- Member: Luise Amtsberg
- Elected: 2025

Kiel is an electoral constituency (German: Wahlkreis) represented in the Bundestag. It elects one member via first-past-the-post voting. Under the current constituency numbering system, it is designated as constituency 5. It is located in central Schleswig-Holstein, comprising the city of Kiel.

Kiel was created for the inaugural 1949 federal election. From 2017 to 2025, it was represented by Mathias Stein of the Social Democratic Party (SPD). Since 2025 it has been represented by Luise Amtsberg of Alliance 90/The Greens.

== Geography ==
Kiel is located in central Schleswig-Holstein. As of the 2021 federal election, it comprises the entirety of the urban district of Kiel, as well as the municipalities of Altenholz and Kronshagen from the Rendsburg-Eckernförde district.

== History ==
Kiel was created in 1949. Until 1972, it was constituency 6 in the numbering system. In the 1949 and 1953 elections, it covered the entirety of the city of Kiel with the exception of voting districts 23 and 26–42. In the 1957 and 1961 elections, it did not contain the city districts of Wik and Ravensberg, which were part of the Rendsburg constituency. From 1965 to 1972, it did not include the city districts of Friedrichsort, Holtenau, Pries and Schilksee, which were part of the Schleswig - Eckernförde constituency.

From 1976 to 2002, Kiel was coterminous with the city of Kiel. For the 2002 election, the municipalities of Altenholz and Kronshagen were transferred from the Rendsburg-Eckernförde constituency to Kiel.

Election	No.	Name	Borders
1949	6	Kiel	Kiel city (excluding voting districts 23 and 26–42)
1953	6	Kiel	Kiel city (excluding voting districts 23 and 26–42)
1957	6	Kiel	Kiel city (excluding Wik and Ravensberg)
1961	6	Kiel	Kiel city (excluding Wik and Ravensberg)
1965	6	Kiel	Kiel city (excluding Friedrichsort, Holtenau, Pries, and Schilksee)
1969	6	Kiel	Kiel city (excluding Friedrichsort, Holtenau, Pries, and Schilksee)
1972	5	Kiel	Kiel city (excluding Friedrichsort, Holtenau, Pries, and Schilksee)
1976	5	Kiel	Kiel city
1980	5	Kiel	Kiel city
1983	5	Kiel	Kiel city
1987	5	Kiel	Kiel city
1990	5	Kiel	Kiel city
1994	5	Kiel	Kiel city
1998	5	Kiel	Kiel city
2002	5	Kiel	Kiel city; Rendsburg-Eckernförde district (only Altenholz and Kronshagen municipalities)
2005	5	Kiel	Kiel city; Rendsburg-Eckernförde district (only Altenholz and Kronshagen municipalities)
2009	5	Kiel	Kiel city; Rendsburg-Eckernförde district (only Altenholz and Kronshagen municipalities)
2013	5	Kiel	Kiel city; Rendsburg-Eckernförde district (only Altenholz and Kronshagen municipalities)
2017	5	Kiel	Kiel city; Rendsburg-Eckernförde district (only Altenholz and Kronshagen municipalities)
2021	5	Kiel	Kiel city; Rendsburg-Eckernförde district (only Altenholz and Kronshagen municipalities)
2025	5	Kiel	Kiel city; Rendsburg-Eckernförde district (only Altenholz and Kronshagen municipalities)

== Members ==
The constituency has been held by the Social Democratic Party (SPD) during all but three Bundestag terms since 1949; it has returned a representative from the SPD in every federal election since 1961. Its first representative was Walter Brookmann of the Christian Democratic Union (CDU) from 1949–57, followed by Hans-Carl Rüdel, also from the CDU. It was won by the SPD in 1961, and represented by Fritz Baade for a single term. He was succeeded by Hans Müthling, who served until 1972. Between then and 1998, it was represented by Norbert Gansel. Gansel left the Bundestag to become mayor of Kiel, and Hans-Peter Bartels was elected as representative in the 1998 federal election, and served until 2017, when he was succeeded by Mathias Stein.

Election	Member	Party	%
1949	Walter Brookmann	CDU	52.9
1953	Walter Brookmann	CDU	55.6
1957	Hans-Carl Rüdel	CDU	50.0
1961	Fritz Baade	SPD	47.0
1965	Hans Müthling	SPD	49.0
1969	Hans Müthling	SPD	54.6
1972	Norbert Gansel	SPD	59.4
1976	Norbert Gansel	SPD	57.2
1980	Norbert Gansel	SPD	58.3
1983	Norbert Gansel	SPD	53.9
1987	Norbert Gansel	SPD	53.0
1990	Norbert Gansel	SPD	51.0
1994	Norbert Gansel	SPD	52.7
1998	Hans-Peter Bartels	SPD	54.9
2002	Hans-Peter Bartels	SPD	53.7
2005	Hans-Peter Bartels	SPD	50.7
2009	Hans-Peter Bartels	SPD	38.3
2013	Hans-Peter Bartels	SPD	43.0
2017	Mathias Stein	SPD	31.0
2021	Mathias Stein	SPD	29.5
2025	Luise Amtsberg	Green	26.0

== Election results ==
=== 2025 election ===
Federal election (2025): Kiel
Notes:	Blue background denotes the winner of the electorate vote. Pink background denotes a candidate elected from their party list. Yellow background denotes an electorate win by a list member, or other incumbent. A ✓ or ✗ denotes status of any incumbent, win or lose respectively.						
Party	Candidate	Votes	%	±%	Party votes	%	±%
Greens	Luise Amtsberg	43,283	26.0	▼2.1	38,149	22.9	▼5.5
SPD	Christina Schubert	36,688	22.1	▼7.4	32,088	19.3	▼6.7
CDU	Magdalena Drewes	34,941	21.0	▲2.7	32,842	19.7	▲4.3
AfD	Hubert Pinto de Kraus	17,811	10.7	▲6.1	17,883	10.8	▲5.8
Left	Tamara Mazzi	15,946	9.6	▲4.9	22,779	13.7	▲7.6
SSW	Frank Schmidt	7,363	4.4	▲1.8	6,343	3.8	▲0.9
FDP	Maximilian Mordhorst	4,825	2.9	▼4.5	6,567	3.9	▼6.4
BSW					5,448	3.3	New
Volt	Kim Holzmann	2,526	1.5	▲1.1	1,927	1.2	▲0.8
PARTEI	Ove Schröter	2,020	1.2	▼0.7	1,457	0.9	▼0.5
FW	Jorg Böttcher	777	0.5	▼0.3	575	0.3	▼0.3
BD					185	0.1	New
MLPD					61	<0.1	0.0
Informal votes		1,025			901		
Total valid votes		166,180			166,304		
Turnout		167,205	83.0	▲5.9			
Greens gain from SPD	Majority	6,595	3.9	N/A			

=== 2021 election ===
Federal election (2021): Kiel
Notes:	Blue background denotes the winner of the electorate vote. Pink background denotes a candidate elected from their party list. Yellow background denotes an electorate win by a list member, or other incumbent. A ✓ or ✗ denotes status of any incumbent, win or lose respectively.						
Party	Candidate	Votes	%	±%	Party votes	%	±%
SPD	✓ Mathias Stein	45,709	29.5	▼1.5	40,338	26.0	▲2.2
Greens	Luise Amtsberg	43,532	28.1	▲13.8	44,089	28.4	▲11.2
CDU	Thomas Stritzl	28,416	18.4	▼12.3	23,920	15.4	▼11.4
FDP	Maximilian Mordhorst	11,445	7.4	▼0.1	16,110	10.4	▼1.3
Left	Lorenz Gösta Beutin	7,275	4.7	▼2.6	9,430	6.1	▼4.1
AfD	Eike Reimers	7,147	4.6	▼1.5	7,654	4.9	▼2.0
SSW	Marcel Schmidt	4,141	2.7		4,486	2.9	
PARTEI	Florian Wrobel	2,944	1.9	▼0.7	2,185	1.4	▼0.7
dieBasis	Björn Michel	2,009	1.3		1,924	1.2	
Tierschutzpartei					1,676	1.1	
FW	Christian Görtz	1,144	0.7		954	0.6	▲0.3
Team Todenhöfer					747	0.5	
Volt	Simon Wadehn	666	0.4		556	0.4	
Humanists					299	0.2	
V-Partei3					171	0.1	
NPD					122	0.1	▼0.1
ÖDP					116	0.1	▼0.2
du.	Paula Bianka Abramik	202	0.1		114	0.1	
DKP	Barbara Müller	110	0.1		88	0.1	
LKR					50	0.0	
MLPD	Karin Zan Bi	76	0.0	▼0.1	39	0.0	▼0.1
Informal votes		1,170			918		
Total valid votes		154,816			155,068		
Turnout		155,986	77.0	▲2.1			
SPD hold	Majority	2,177	1.4	▲1.1			

=== 2017 election ===
Federal election (2017): Kiel
Notes:	Blue background denotes the winner of the electorate vote. Pink background denotes a candidate elected from their party list. Yellow background denotes an electorate win by a list member, or other incumbent. A ✓ or ✗ denotes status of any incumbent, win or lose respectively.						
Party	Candidate	Votes	%	±%	Party votes	%	±%
SPD	Mathias Stein	46,991	31.0	▼12.0	36,208	23.8	▼10.9
CDU	Thomas Stritzl	46,560	30.7	▼2.4	40,736	26.8	▼3.5
Greens	Luise Amtsberg	21,743	14.3	▲4.4	26,143	17.2	▲3.1
FDP	Sebastian Blumenthal	11,363	7.5	▲5.4	17,804	11.7	▲6.4
Left	Maxim Smirnow	11,114	7.3	▲2.1	15,546	10.2	▲3.3
AfD	Eike Reimers	9,283	6.1	▲3.3	10,504	6.9	▲3.2
PARTEI	Ove Schröter	4,017	2.6		3,214	2.1	
BGE					632	0.4	
FW					540	0.4	
ÖDP					345	0.2	
New Liberals	Markus Jakupak	342	0.2				
MLPD	Karin Zan Bi	266	0.2		147	0.1	0.0
NPD					250	0.2	▼0.4
Informal votes		1,594			1,204		
Total valid votes		151,679			152,069		
Turnout		153,273	74.9	▲3.5			
SPD hold	Majority	431	0.3	▼9.6			

=== 2013 election ===
Federal election (2013): Kiel
Notes:	Blue background denotes the winner of the electorate vote. Pink background denotes a candidate elected from their party list. Yellow background denotes an electorate win by a list member, or other incumbent. A ✓ or ✗ denotes status of any incumbent, win or lose respectively.						
Party	Candidate	Votes	%	±%	Party votes	%	±%
SPD	✓ Hans-Peter Bartels	62,271	43.0	▲4.7	50,262	34.7	▲5.1
CDU	Thomas Stritzl	47,925	33.1	▲3.0	43,893	30.3	▲4.9
Greens	Luise Amtsberg	14,435	10.0	▼3.2	20,394	14.1	▼3.1
Left	Raju Sharma	7,622	5.3	▼3.1	10,023	6.9	▼2.5
AfD	Arne Stanneck	4,040	2.8		5,379	3.7	
Pirates	Bastian Grundmann	3,575	2.5		3,946	2.7	▼0.3
FDP	Sebastian Blumenthal	3,069	2.1	▼6.5	7,708	5.3	▼8.1
Tierschutzpartei					1,201	0.8	
Rentner	Helmut Lemke	920	0.6		817	0.6	▼0.4
NPD	Hermann Josef Andreas Gutsche	834	0.6	▼0.4	802	0.6	▼0.3
FW					473	0.3	
Independent	Gerald Hohmann	87	0.1				
MLPD					71	0.0	0.0
Informal votes		1,674			1,483		
Total valid votes		144,778			144,969		
Turnout		146,452	71.4	▼1.3			
SPD hold	Majority	14,346	9.9	▲1.7			

=== 2009 election ===
Federal election (2009): Kiel
Notes:	Blue background denotes the winner of the electorate vote. Pink background denotes a candidate elected from their party list. Yellow background denotes an electorate win by a list member, or other incumbent. A ✓ or ✗ denotes status of any incumbent, win or lose respectively.						
Party	Candidate	Votes	%	±%	Party votes	%	±%
SPD	✓ Hans-Peter Bartels	54,398	38.3	▼12.4	42,369	29.6	▼11.9
CDU	Michaela Pries	42,733	30.1	▼3.8	36,397	25.4	▼3.4
Greens	Lutz Oschmann	18,699	13.2	▲7.0	24,659	17.2	▲4.5
FDP	Sebastian Blumenthal	12,188	8.6	▲5.6	19,156	13.4	▲4.5
Left	Cornelia Möhring	11,817	8.3	▲4.2	13,430	9.4	▲3.4
Pirates					4,267	3.0	
Rentner					1,448	1.0	
NPD	Hermann Gutsche	1,392	1.0	▲0.1	1,275	0.9	0.0
Independent	Peter von Wildenradt	814	0.6				
DVU					139	0.1	
MLPD					80	0.1	0.0
Informal votes		3,442			2,263		
Total valid votes		142,041			143,220		
Turnout		145,483	72.6	▼5.1			
SPD hold	Majority	11,665	8.2	▼8.6			

=== 2005 election ===
Federal election (2005): Kiel
Notes:	Blue background denotes the winner of the electorate vote. Pink background denotes a candidate elected from their party list. Yellow background denotes an electorate win by a list member, or other incumbent. A ✓ or ✗ denotes status of any incumbent, win or lose respectively.						
Party	Candidate	Votes	%	±%	Party votes	%	±%
SPD	✓ Hans-Peter Bartels	75,473	50.7	▼3.0	61,777	41.5	▼2.8
CDU	Phillipp Murmann	50,437	33.9	▲3.1	42,945	28.8	▲0.9
Greens	Klaus Müller	9,196	6.2	▼0.5	18,995	12.7	▼2.3
Left	Björn Thoroe	6,103	4.1	▲2.1	8,899	6.0	▲3.8
FDP	Sebastian Blumenthal	4,509	3.0	▼3.0	13,190	8.9	▲0.6
Familie	Oliver Mrozewski	1,759	1.2		1,657	1.1	
NPD	Hermann Gutsche	1,313	0.9	▲0.3	1,377	0.9	▲0.6
MLPD					152	0.1	
Informal votes		2,250			2,048		
Total valid votes		148,790			148,992		
Turnout		151,040	77.8	▼1.1			
SPD hold	Majority	25,036	16.8				
