= Mechthild Rawert =

German politician (born 1957)

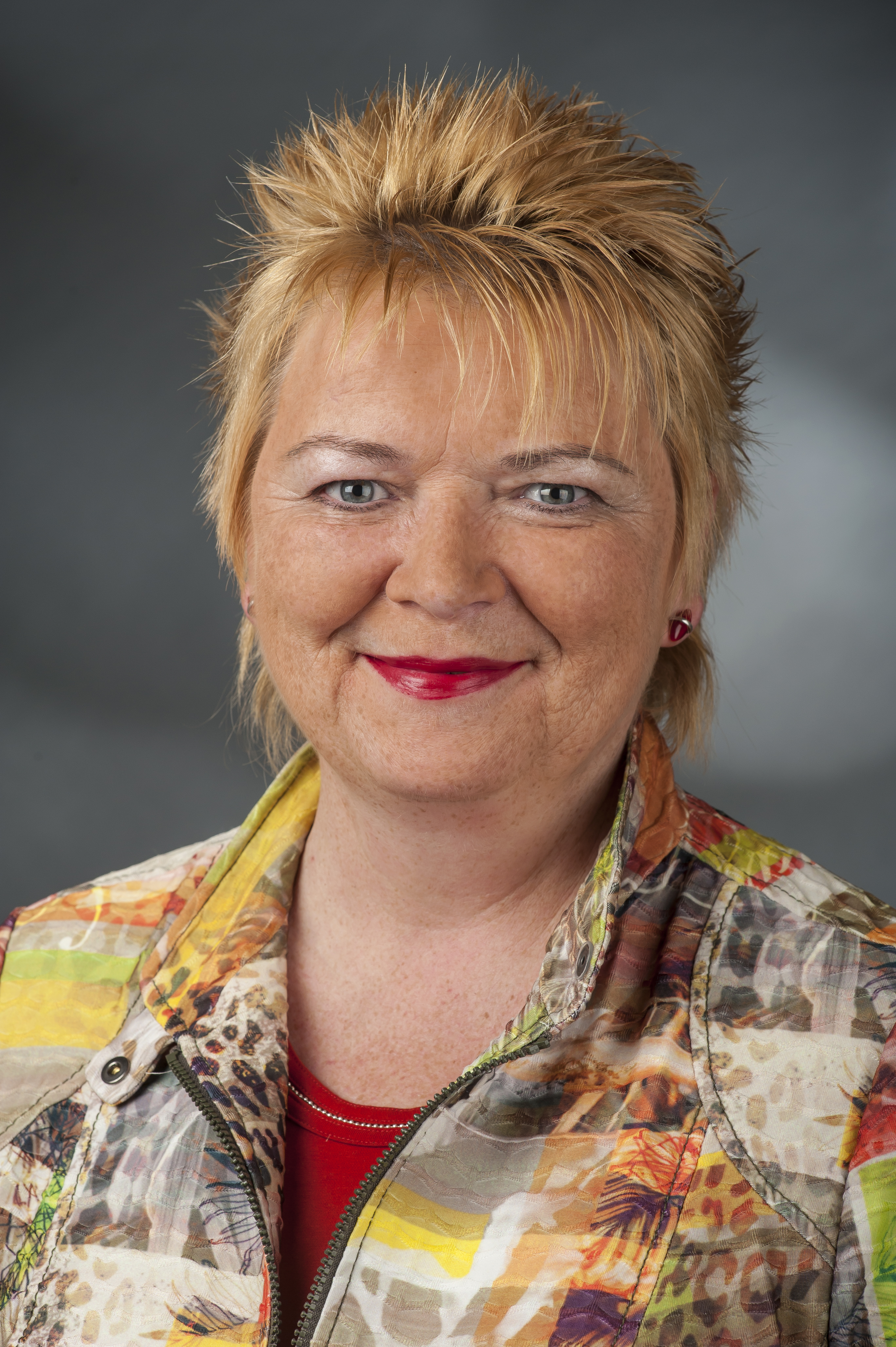
- Rawert in 2014

Member of the Bundestag; from Berlin
- In office 26 May 2020 – 26 October 2021
- Preceded by: Eva Högl
- Succeeded by: Hanna Steinmüller
- Constituency: Berlin-Mitte
- In office 18 October 2005 – 24 October 2017
- Preceded by: Eckhardt Barthel
- Succeeded by: Multi-member district
- Constituency: Berlin-Tempelhof-Schöneberg (2005–2009); State list (2009–2017)

Personal details
- Born: 3 November 1957 (age 68) Coesfeld, West Germany
- Party: Social Democratic
- Education: Free University of Berlin

Mechthild Rawert (born 3 November 1957) is a German politician of the Social Democratic Party (SPD) wh served as a member of the Bundestag from 2005 until 2017 and again from 2020 to 2021, representing Berlin's Tempelhof-Schöneberg district.

== Early life and education ==
Rawert was born in Coesfeld, North Rhine-Westphalia. She holds a degree in adult education from the Free University of Berlin.

== Political career ==
Rawert was a member of the German Bundestag from 2005 until 2017. During that time, she served on the Committee on Health (2005–2017) and the Committee on Food and Agriculture (2005–2009). In addition to her committee assignments, she chaired the German-Maltese Parliamentary Friendship Group from 2014 until 2017.

Also from 2014 until 2018, Rawert was a member of the German delegation to the Parliamentary Assembly of the Council of Europe (PACE). In the Assembly, she serves on the Sub-Committee on Disability and Inclusion.

In 2020, Rawert returned to parliament when she succeeded Eva Högl who had resigned her seat. In parliament, she briefly served on the Committee on Legal Affairs and Consumer Protection.

In the negotiations to form a coalition government between the Christian Democratic Union (CDU) and the SPD under the leadership of Kai Wegner following Berlin's 2023 state elections, Rawert was part of her party's delegation to the working group on labour and social affairs, co-chaired by Ottilie Klein and Lars Düsterhöft.

== Other activities ==
- German Foundation for World Population (DSW), Member of the Parliamentary Advisory Board (2020–2021)
- Magnus Hirschfeld Foundation, Member of the Board of Trustees (2014–2018)
- German Catholic Women's Association (KDFB), Member
- German Federation for the Environment and Nature Conservation (BUND), Member
- German United Services Trade Union (ver.di), Member
- German War Graves Commission, Member
- Gegen Vergessen – Für Demokratie, Member
- Pro Asyl, Member
- Social Association of Germany (SoVD), Member
