= Susanne Gaschke =

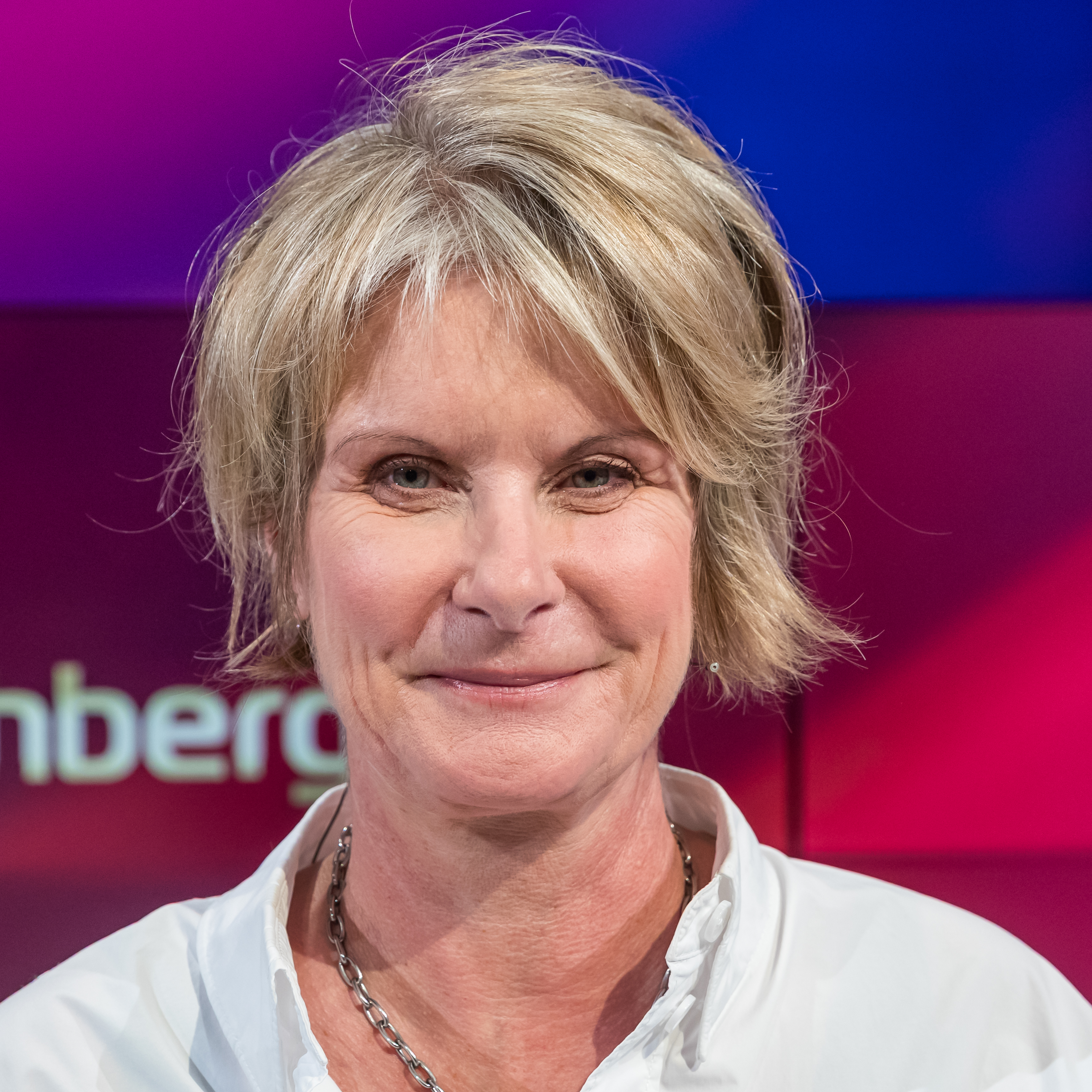
- Susanne Gaschke in 2025
- Born: 19 January 1967 (age 59); Kiel, Germany
- Education: Kiel University
- Occupation: Journalist
- Spouse: Hans-Peter Bartels

Susanne Gaschke (born 19 January 1967) is a German journalist, publicist, and author. From 1997 to 2012, she was an editor at the weekly newspaper Die Zeit. From 2015 to 2022, she worked for Die Welt and Welt am Sonntag. Since 2022, she has written for the Neue Zürcher Zeitung. In 2012, she was elected mayor of Kiel as an SPD candidate. On 28 October 2013, she resigned due to the controversy surrounding an illegal tax exemption and the associated public prosecutor's investigation against her.

Gaschke is the author and editor of several non-fiction books.

== Life ==
After graduating from the Kieler Gelehrtenschule in 1986, Gaschke studied English, education and public law at the Christian-Albrechts University of Kiel, where she received her doctorate in 1995 with her dissertation on children's literature (graded summa cum laude) under Konrad Groß.

She completed an internship at the Kieler Nachrichten and from 1997 was an editor at the weekly newspaper Die Zeit. There she headed the "Young Readers" department, with a focus on social, youth, women's and educational policy. Later she turned in particular to the topics of digital modernity and copyright protection, taking the position of the Heidelberger Appell. Gaschke was also editor of the children's magazine Zeit Leo. From 1 January 2015, to autumn 2022, she was a writer for Welt and Welt am Sonntag, where she was responsible for the column "Das echte Leben" (Real Life), among other things. Since autumn 2022 she has worked for the Neue Zürcher Zeitung.

As a journalist and writer, she deals with social issues such as Digitization, Etiquette and Education and comments on current political events and the situation of the SPD. She also writes reports.

Gaschke is married to Hans-Peter Bartels, a former SPD member of the Bundestag who served as Parliamentary Commissioner for the Armed Forces from 2015 to 2020. The couple has one daughter. They live in Berlin.

== Political career ==
Gaschke was politically active even during his studies, including at Vorsitzende des Allgemeinen Studentenausschusses.

From 1987 to 2020 she was a member of the SPD and gained her first experience with the Jusos.

=== Election for mayor of Kiel in 2012 ===
When Kiel's mayor, Torsten Albig, was elected minister-president of Schleswig-Holstein in 2012, his position in Kiel's city hall became vacant. Gaschke prevailed at an internal party meeting and received the party's support for her candidacy in the direct election. She justified her move into politics with her desire "to change things". She no longer wanted to be just a reporter, but to take on responsibility herself. During the election campaign, Gaschke focused primarily on replacing the coal-fired power plant on the Gemeinschaftskraftwerk Kiel, investments in schools and sports halls, and the city's debt.

In the election in October 2012, Gaschke received the most votes with 43.2 percent, ahead of Gert Meyer (CDU) and Andreas Tietze (Bündnis 90/Die Grünen), but failed to secure an absolute majority. In the runoff election, she was additionally supported by the Greens and won with 54.1 percent of the votes. Gaschke took office as the 18th Mayor of Kiel on 1 December 2012.

=== Controversy and resignation as mayor in 2013 ===
Before Gaschke took office, the city administration, then headed by Torsten Albig, had negotiated for several years with a businessman regarding the settlement of outstanding tax assessments without enforcing them – a situation that had been ordered by a court in 2008 but suspended again in 2011. The claims originated from the taxation of the individual's real estate transactions in the 1990s. Susanne Gaschke relied on her officials, the city treasurer, and Albig's expertise. Albig had commissioned the draft agreement, and the SPD parliamentary group had also been informed and had given its approval. Therefore, in July 2013, Gaschke issued an emergency decree waiving interest and fees amounting to €3.7 million without prior consultation with the city council. The businessman was only required to pay €4.1 million in trade tax in instalments. The urgency was justified by the need to avert the taxpayer's insolvency and to secure at least part of the claim.

The municipal supervisory authority (Kommunalaufsicht) in the Schleswig-Holstein Ministry of the Interior objected to the decree as unlawful, as it was issued, among other things, without the necessary approval of the city council. It instructed the city to rescind the decree immediately, but this was no longer legally possible. The majority of the city council had already waived its right to reverse the decision on 22 August 2013. Furthermore, errors in the supervisory authority's report were later discovered, including the incorrect attribution of a signature in the file to a specific person. In October 2013, the Kiel public prosecutor's office opened an investigation against Gaschke on suspicion of breach of trust, which was discontinued in May 2014 due to insufficient evidence.

In the course of the controversy, Gaschke announced her immediate resignation at the end of October 2013 and subsequently requested to be released from her temporary civil service position. She cited the ongoing media debate surrounding her as one of the reasons for her resignation and criticized the journalists' "pseudo-neutral refereeing". Later, she criticized a "journalistic superhumanism". This term had previously been used by Frank Schirrmacher to describe the excessive expectations in journalistic reporting. Other observers accused Gaschke of being aloof and "stubborn" Björn Engholm, and of seeing herself as a victim. Before her resignation, Gaschke described her decision in the tax proceedings as a mistake and apologized to party colleagues and council members.

At the end of 2014, the entrepreneur in question filed for insolvency despite the tax debt forgiveness. This could result in the city receiving significantly less money than the forgiveness initiated by Gaschke had provided for. The insolvency plan adopted by the creditors' meeting in November 2016 provides for an insolvency quota of 30 percent.

=== Party resignation in 2020 ===
In May 2020, Gaschke left the SPD after 33 years, explaining her decision in Die Welt, among other things, by citing the party's "dishonorable behavior" towards her husband, Hans-Peter Bartels, who had not been renominated as Parliamentary Commissioner for the Armed Forces and had been replaced by Eva Högl. She stated that the SPD had transformed from a party of upward mobility into a party of patronage, where only jobs, offices, and company cars mattered. Qualifications, contrary to the party's internal logic, no longer played a role.

She also identified political errors in education policy (Bologna), school reform following PISA, and family policy. The reasons for the SPD's decline to a "15 percent party" lay in the party's departure from the center-right and its continued reliance on the grand coalition".

=== Pandemic measures in 2021 ===
In an opinion piece published in Die Welt on 11 April 2021, Gaschke wrote that the government had lost touch with reality regarding the pandemic measures. She asserted that a "Zero-COVID" sect was ruling the Chancellery, pursuing the fictitious goal of preventing any infections in a globalized country. She lamented that many media outlets had given support to this "fiction" and appealed to the Bundestag to put a stop to the "Chancellor's Office's corona madness." She found the federal government's efforts to undermine federalism particularly concerning.

In a commentary for the Neuen Zürcher Zeitung, she wrote that politics had now been "completely and utterly pedagogized." Germans, in particular, reveled in "150 percent obedience to corona regulations".

Nur wenn die Massnahmen beinhart sind und die Unterwerfung total ist, nur wenn man kritische Nachfragen absolut unterlässt, ist man ein guter Corona-Staatsbürger.

She wrote that the German Infection Protection Act was summarily transformed into an Enabling Act. Gaschke criticized the federal government's "paternalism " and its " contact restrictions – totalitarianism".

=== Reichsbürger raid ===
Following the nationwide large-scale operation against Reichsbürger conspiracy theorists, Gaschke concluded in 2022: "A coup or civil war is certainly not imminent in Germany," but admitted: "apparently, the milieu of the security forces also repeatedly attracts some authoritarian anti-democrats".

=== Member of the value-conservative think tank R21 ===
Gaschke is a member of the conservative value network Republik21, which positions itself against woke politics.

== Publications ==
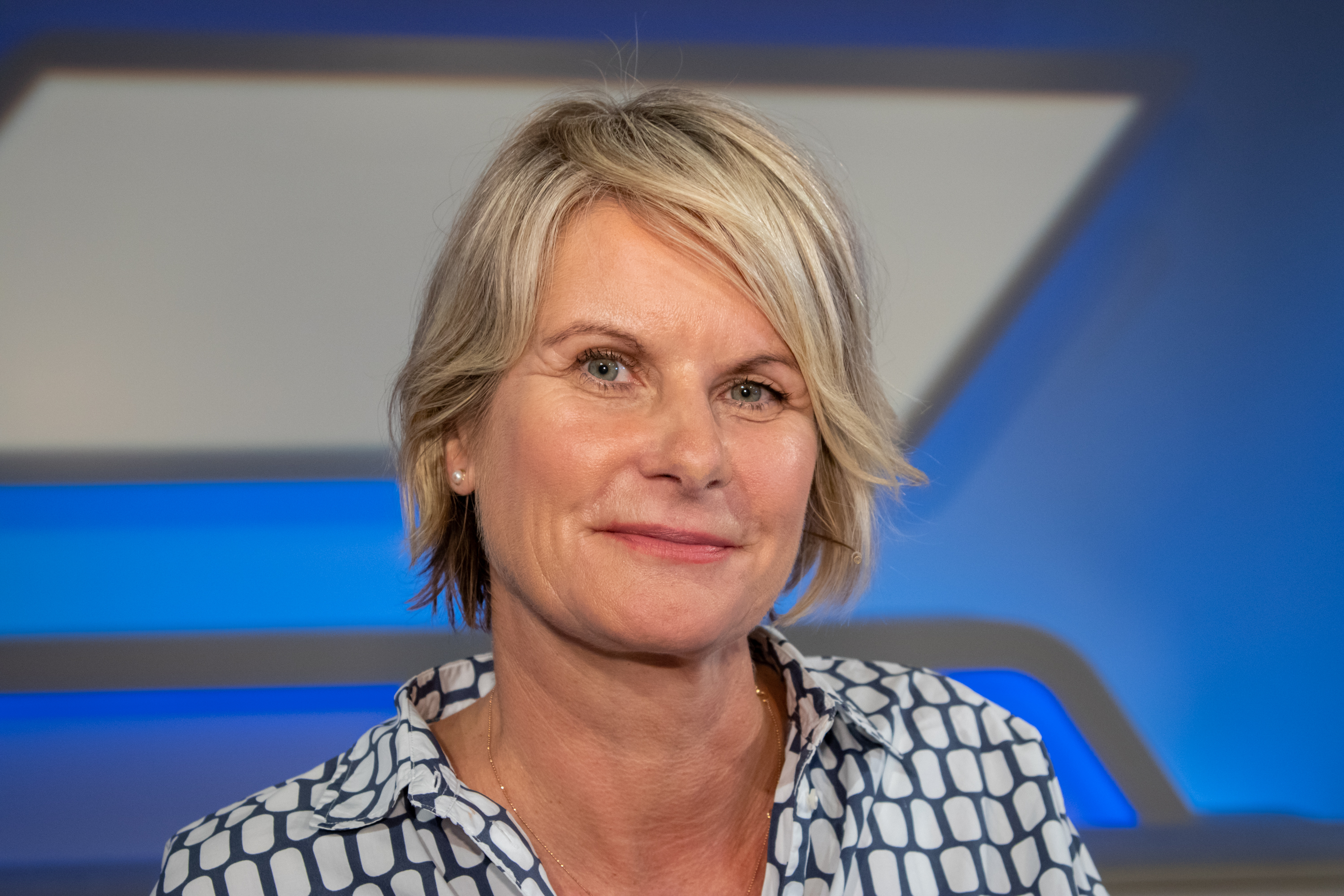
Susanne Gaschke (2019)

=== The Education Catastrophe, 2001 ===
Gaschke's first book was published in 2001 by Deutsche Verlags-Anstalt under the title The Education Catastrophe. Arnulf Baring summarized the statement:

Engagierte, an ihren Kindern vital interessierte Eltern sind – was immer sonst gesagt und geschrieben werden mag – einfach unentbehrlich. Eltern sind im Kern durch nichts und niemanden zu ersetzen.

In this sense, Gaschke criticizes the excessive demands placed on schools by educational tasks and identifies shortcomings in early childhood education. She sees a disorientation in the belief of many adults that the child knows best what is good for it. Overall, the main characteristics of the younger generation, namely poor articulation, excessive tolerance, egocentrism, low frustration tolerance, and the influence of television and the internet, are effects of an infantilized, childless, ego-driven society and the lingering ideology of the protests of 1968. This movement, with its concepts of anti-authoritarian education and the free development of personality, fundamentally misunderstood the purpose and meaning of education.

=== Witches, Hobbits and Pirates, 2002 ===
In 2002, also published by DVA, came the book Witches, Hobbits and Pirates, about the 100 best books for children. Roswitha Budeus-Budde viewed the selection rather critically, finding it too narrow and overly focused on English literature. She was particularly bothered by the absence of German children's and young adult authors from the last thirty years.

=== The Emancipation Trap, 2005 ===
She received wider attention for her book "The Emancipation Trap", published by C. Bertelsmann Verlag. In it, she analyses the life situation of women and addresses their responsibility to society as well as the (demographic) consequences of what she calls the ideology of emancipation, careerism, and consumerism. For Gaschke, the original goals of the women's movement have "prevailed in an almost uncanny way." The fact that women are not only more emotionally and socially competent, but also cognitively more advanced than men, is now commonplace. However, this success comes at a price: childlessness. Gaschke argues for a new seriousness in partnerships, moving away from romance and promiscuity promoted in mass media; e.g.; Sex and the City.

=== Alone Is Not Enough, 2007 ===
In 2007, she published the book Alone Is Not Enough with Gesine Schwan, published by Herder Verlag.

=== Klick, 2009 ===
With Klick (Herder Verlag, 2009), she wanted to demonstrate "strategies against digital dumbing down" and thus joined a fundamental critique of digital media.

=== The Sold Childhood, 2011 ===
In her 2011 book The Sold Childhood, she addressed the shortening of childhood through consumption and communication.

=== Full Risk, 2014 ===
In 2014, she described her path to becoming mayor of Kiel in her book Volles Risiko (Full Risk) , the controversy surrounding her resignation, and criticized the way leading SPD Schleswig-Holstein. According to Michael Naumanns she presented a scandalous story "that goes far beyond the merely apparent provincialism of a local farce." Gaschke was "forced" to resign, and by her own party; she had become "the victim of unparalleled media and party-political mobbing".

… zu Fall gebracht von einer durch und durch staatstreuen, recherchefaulen Lokalpresse, einer unterlegenen Genossin und vor allem von einem Ministerpräsidenten, der seine PR-Fähigkeiten mit aller Amtsmacht eingesetzt hatte, um sich von einem alles in allem lächerlichen Steuervergleich zu distanzieren, den er allein in die Wege geleitet und mit zu verantworten hatte.

=== SPD, 2017 ===
In 2017, her non-fiction book, an analysis of the SPD's decline, was published: SPD: A Party Between Burnout and Euphoria. Her biography of Green Party co-chair Robert Habeck appeared in August 2021.

== Publications ==
=== Monographs ===
- PublicationsDie Welt in Büchern. Kinder, Literatur und ästhetische Wirkung. Dissertation. Königshausen und Neumann, Würzburg 1995, ISBN 978-3-88479-966-6.
- Die Erziehungskatastrophe. Kinder brauchen starke Eltern. Deutsche Verlags-Anstalt, München 2001, ISBN 978-3-421-05465-4.
- Hexen, Hobbits und Piraten. Die besten Bücher für Kinder. Deutsche Verlags-Anstalt, München 2002, ISBN 978-3-421-05668-9.
- Die Emanzipationsfalle. Erfolgreich, einsam, kinderlos. Bertelsmann, München 2005, ISBN 978-3-570-00821-8.
- Das kinderlose Land: wie die Demographie unser Leben verändert, with Dietmar Bartz (Hrsg.). Zeitverlag Bucerius, Hamburg 2005, DNB-IDN 123025788 (= Zeit-Dokument 2005.1):
- mit Gesine Schwan: Allein ist nicht genug. Für eine neue Kultur der Gemeinsamkeit. Herder, Freiburg im Breisgau 2007, ISBN 978-3-451-29477-8.
- Klick – Strategien gegen die digitale Verdummung. Herder, Freiburg im Breisgau 2009, ISBN 978-3-451-29996-4.
- Die verkaufte Kindheit. Wie Kinderwünsche vermarktet werden und was Eltern dagegen tun können. Pantheon, München 2011, ISBN 978-3-570-55172-1.
- Volles Risiko. Was es bedeutet, in die Politik zu gehen. Deutsche Verlags-Anstalt, München 2014, ISBN 978-3-421-04659-8.
- SPD. Eine Partei zwischen Burnout und Euphorie. Deutsche Verlags-Anstalt, München 2017, ISBN 978-3-421-04717-5.
- Robert Habeck. Eine politische Biografie. Heyne Verlag, 2021, ISBN 978-3-641-26684-4.

=== Editor ===
- With Moritz Müller-Wirth: Powerpaare – mit Kindern sind wir stärker. Heyne, München 2008, ISBN 978-3-453-15103-1.

=== Articles (selection) ===
- Und keiner schaut hin. Vergewaltigung in der S-Bahn: Warum hat niemand dem Opfer geholfen? In: Die Zeit, 18 April 1997
- Die Ego-Polizei. In: Die Zeit, 24 October 1997 (Debatte über "Menschenpflichten")
- Generation in Gefahr. Wie diese Gesellschaft ihre Jugend verspielt. In: Die Zeit, 7 May 1998
- Verheißung Internet. Alle Schulen ans Netz – ist das die Lösung? In: Die Zeit, 30 March 2000
- Neoliberalismus – Die Neunmalklugen. In: Die Zeit, 16 October 2008
- Lasst die Männer nicht in Ruh. In: Die Zeit, 15 December 2005
- "Nicht gleich morden". Die Zeit, 2 March 2006 (Interview with Sybil Gräfin Schönfeldt)
- Ein ganz sanfter Anreiz – Die Beschwerden über das neue Elterngeld sind von gestern. In: Die Zeit, 8 December 2005
- Eine Frage der Moral. In: Die Zeit, 23 May 2002
- Im Netz der Piraten. In: Die Zeit, 23 April 2009
- Als die SPD einmal glücklich war. In: Die Zeit, 10 June 2009
- Mehrheit der Frauen will keine Gendersternchen. In: Die Welt. 31 May 2020.
- Kommentar für die NZZ 2019 über moralisierenden Journalismus
- Kommentar für die NZZ 2020, in dem sie die Corona-Regelungen in Deutschland als "Ermächtigungsgesetz" bezeichnete
