= Merendino =

Merendino is a surname. Notable people with the surname include:

- James Merendino (born 1969), American film director and screenwriter
- Stella Merendino (born 1994), German politician

== See also ==
- Merienda
- Merendera
