= Hugo Preuß Bridge =

Hugo Preuß Bridge Hugo-Preuß-Brücke
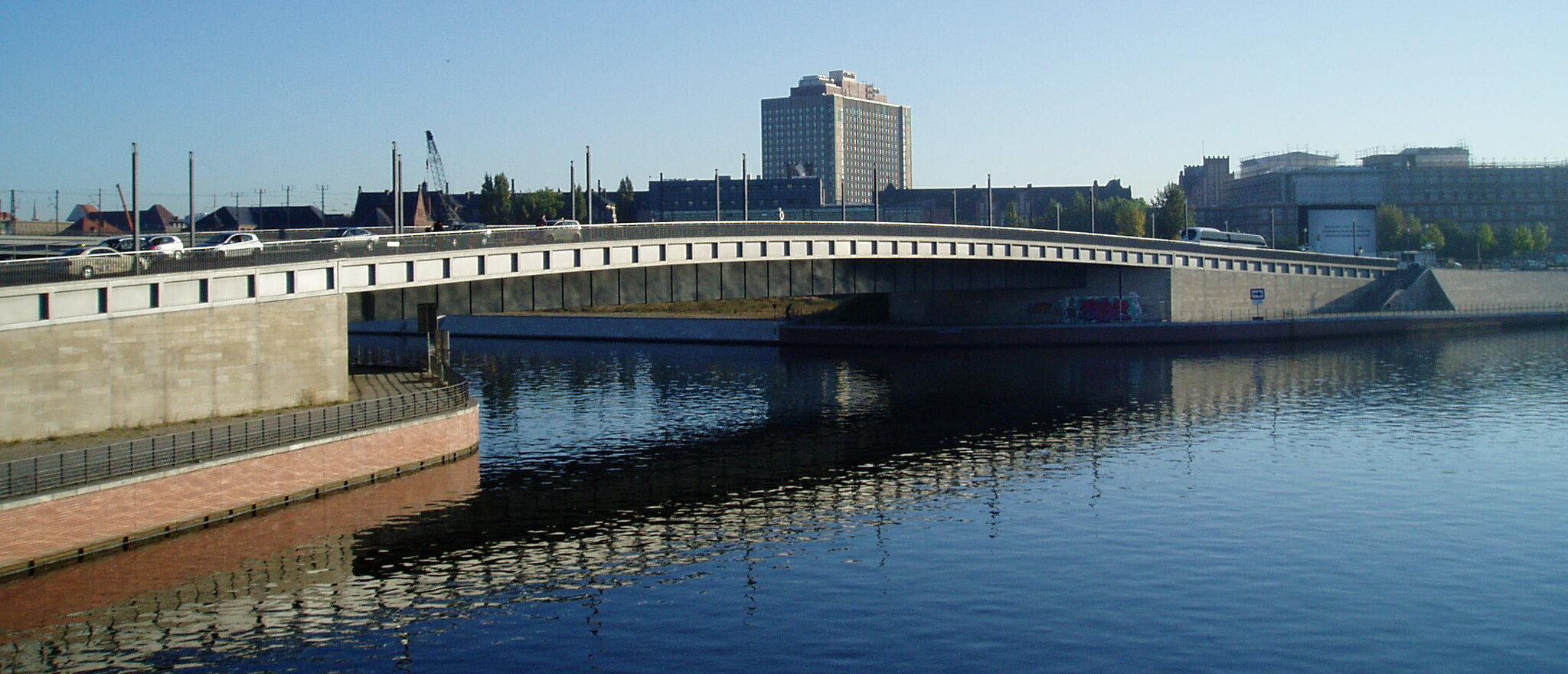
- The bridge in 2011
- Coordinates: 52°31′25″N 13°22′20″E
- Locale: Berlin, Germany
- Begins: Berlin-Mitte
- Ends: Moabit

Location
- Interactive map of Hugo Preuß Bridge

The Hugo Preuß Bridge was a historically significant bridge spanning the Humboldthafen basin on the River Spree in Berlin-Mitte. Originally constructed in the 1920s, the bridge was named after the liberal Jewish politician and constitutional lawyer Hugo Preuß (1860–1925), a key architect of the Weimar Constitution. Destroyed during World War II, the bridge was later reconstructed in 2004 in the course of redeveloping the Berlin Spreebogen and government district.

== History ==
The Humboldthafen emerged in the mid-19th century during the construction of the Berlin-Spandau Shipping Canal. Excavated as a harbor basin, it quickly evolved into a crucial logistical hub. Adjacent to it were key railway stations including the Lehrter Bahnhof and the Hamburger Bahnhof—the sites of today's Berlin Central Station and the National Gallery of Contemporary Art, respectively. This strategic location facilitated intensive cargo operations and increasing transportation demands.

A succession of bridges spanned the harbor's entrance from the northern bend of the River Spree. Among them was the Alsen Bridge, which suffered severe damage from colliding freight ships. This led to the construction of a new iron suspension bridge in the mid-1920s.

The new structure, inaugurated in 1928, was named Hugo-Preuß-Brücke in honor of the liberal politician associated with Germany's democratic foundations. The bridge represented modern engineering aspirations in Berlin's rapidly transforming urban landscape. The artist Erich Heckel, known for his depictions of industrial and urban scenes, captured the construction of the bridge in a watercolor titled Berliner Hafen (1927), where loaded freight ships and the elegant Wilhelmine-era residences of the Alsenviertel form a striking visual contrast.

A 1928 article in the architectural journal Bauwelt reflected the design challenges posed by such urban infrastructure:

“It seems almost impossible to fully harmonize a structure designed purely for traffic purposes with its surroundings […]. As in all cities, the new will not always coexist peacefully with the old.”

Following the rise of the National Socialist regime in 1933, the bridge was renamed Admiral Scheer Bridge, after the German naval commander. Like much of Berlin's infrastructure, it sustained heavy damage during World War II and was ultimately destroyed. For decades after the war, the bridge remained in ruins. Only in the wake of German reunification and the comprehensive redesign of the Berlin government district and Spreebogen area was the bridge rebuilt. The new Hugo Preuß Bridge, completed in 2004, restored both the name and function of the original structure, symbolizing democratic continuity and urban regeneration. The bridge today stands not only as a piece of transportation infrastructure but also as a commemorative link to Berlin's historical evolution—from imperial capital to divided city to reunited democracy.
