= Ellen Haußdörfer =

German politician (born 1980)

- Haußdörfer in 2026

Member of the Abgeordnetenhaus of Berlin
- In office 4 November 2021 – 28 April 2023
- Preceded by: Frank Scholtysek
- Succeeded by: Alexander Freier-Winterwerb
- Constituency: Treptow-Köpenick 3 (2021–2023); Treptow-Köpenick (2023)
- In office 26 October 2006 – 27 October 2016
- Preceded by: Walter Kaczmarczyk
- Succeeded by: Frank Scholtysek
- Constituency: Treptow-Köpenick 3

Personal details
- Born: 24 April 1980 (age 46) Cottbus
- Party: Social Democratic Party (since 2002)

Ellen Haußdörfer (born 24 April 1980 in Cottbus) is a German politician serving as state secretary of health and care of Berlin since 2023. She was a member of the Abgeordnetenhaus of Berlin from 2006 to 2016, and again from 2021 to 2023.
