= Treptow-Köpenick 2 =

State electoral district of Germany

- Electoral district for the Berlin House of Representatives
- Treptow-Köpenick 2 in 2023
- District: Treptow-Köpenick
- Electorate: 27,757 (2026)

Current electoral district
- Party: The Left
- Member: Lisa Pfitzmann

Treptow-Köpenick 2 is an electoral constituency (German: Wahlkreis) represented in the House of Representatives of Berlin. It elects one member via first-past-the-post voting.

== Geography ==
In 2023, the constituency comprised the districts of Oberschöneweide, Niederschöneweide, and Johannisthal. It is entirely within the borough of Treptow-Köpenick.

There were 27,757 eligible voters in 2026.

== Members ==
Election	Member	Party	%
1995	Hanns-Peter Harmann	PDS	39.4
1999	Michael Schneider	PDS	41.8
2001	Michael Schneider	PDS	43.4
2006	Karlheinz Nolte	SPD	34.8
2011	Karlheinz Nolte	SPD	33.7
2016	Lars Düsterhöft	SPD	26.5
2021	Lars Düsterhöft	SPD	31.4
2023	Lars Düsterhöft	SPD	29.2
2026	Lisa Pfitzmann	Left	35.6

== Election results ==
=== 2026 election ===
State election (2026): Treptow-Köpenick 2
Notes:	Blue background denotes the winner of the electorate vote. Pink background denotes a candidate elected from their party list. Yellow background denotes an electorate win by a list member, or other incumbent. A ✓ or ✗ denotes status of any incumbent, win or lose respectively.						
Party	Candidate	Votes	%	±%	Party votes	%	±%
Left	Lisa Pfitzmann	7,203	35.6	▲17.2	6,769	33.1	▲15.3
AfD	Janine Paetzel	4,197	20.7	▲8.6	4,188	20.5	▲8.2
SPD	Paul Bahlmann	2,543	12.6	▼10.5	1,963	9.6	▼7.5
CDU	Katrin Hegenscheid	2,360	11.7	▼7.7	2,253	11.0	▼8.6
Greens	Sven Dohnalek	1,847	9.1	▼5.7	2,215	10.8	▼4.7
BSW	Katja Sirotkin	1,135	5.6		1,162	5.7	
Tierschutzpartei					495	2.4	▼1.0
Volt	Hendrik Schäfer	589	2.9		493	2.4	▲1.4
FDP	Michael Maillinger	376	1.9	▼1.6	373	1.8	▼1.9
PARTEI					269	1.3	▼1.1
PdF					103	0.5	
HEIMAT					52	0.3	▼0.1
ÖDP					46	0.2	▼0.1
DKP					32	0.2	▼0.2
du.					17	0.1	▼0.3
SGP					7	0.0	
Informal votes		427			240		
Total valid votes		20,250			20,437		
Turnout		20,677	74.5	▲13.8			
Left gain from SPD	Majority	3,006	14.9				

=== 2023 repeat election ===
Changes denoted below for the 2023 election are compared to the 2016 election, as the 2021 election was declared invalid.

State election (2023): Treptow-Köpenick 2
Notes:	Blue background denotes the winner of the electorate vote. Pink background denotes a candidate elected from their party list. Yellow background denotes an electorate win by a list member, or other incumbent. A ✓ or ✗ denotes status of any incumbent, win or lose respectively.						
Party	Candidate	Votes	%	±%	Party votes	%	±%
SPD	✓ Lars Düsterhöft	6,277	29.2	▲2.7	4,403	20.4	▼0.4
CDU	Sascha Lawrenz	4,513	21.0	▲8.4	4,768	22.1	▲10.8
Left	Philipp Wohlfeil	3,477	16.2	▼8.4	3,539	16.4	▼7.2
AfD	Alexander Bertram	2,923	13.6	▼7.4	2,915	13.5	▼6.7
Greens	Charlotte Steinmetz	2,297	10.7	▲2.7	2,682	12.4	▲4.2
Tierschutzpartei	Jennifer Schrodt	986	4.6		726	3.4	▲0.7
FDP	Laila Marie Leiv	619	2.9		729	3.4	▲0.1
PARTEI					421	2.0	▼0.7
Volt					189	0.9	
The Grays					170	0.8	
FW	Burkhard Flader	226	1.0		107	0.5	
dieBasis	Katja Sirotkin	193	0.9		122	0.6	
Gray Panthers					100	0.5	▼0.8
Pirates					86	0.4	▼1.5
Verjüngungsforschung					76	0.4	▼0.4
Team Todenhöfer					66	0.3	
Klimaliste					59	0.3	
Mieterpartei					58	0.3	
Humanists					57	0.3	
du.					55	0.3	
DKP					55	0.3	▼0.1
NPD					41	0.2	▼1.2
Bildet Berlin!					40	0.2	
ÖDP					23	0.1	
The Pinks/Alliance 21					20	0.1	
Bergpartei, die ÜberPartei					18	0.1	
SGP					16	0.1	▼0.1
LKR	Bernd Stahlberg	18	0.1		10	0.0	▼0.5
BüSo					4	0.0	▼0.1
Informal votes		183			166		
Total valid votes		21,529			21,555		
Turnout		21,737	61.3	▼3.3			
SPD hold	Majority	1,764	8.2				

=== 2021 election (annulled) ===
The election in 2021 was annulled and rerun in 2023.

State election (2021): Treptow-Köpenick 2
Notes:	Blue background denotes the winner of the electorate vote. Pink background denotes a candidate elected from their party list. Yellow background denotes an electorate win by a list member, or other incumbent. A ✓ or ✗ denotes status of any incumbent, win or lose respectively.						
Party	Candidate	Votes	%	±%	Party votes	%	±%
SPD	✓ Lars Düsterhöft	8,156	31.4	▲4.9	6,300	24.0	▲3.2
Left	Philipp Wohlfeil	4,959	19.1	▼5.5	5,000	19.1	▼4.6
Greens	Charlotte Steinmetz	3,175	12.2	▲4.2	3,333	12.7	▲4.5
AfD	Alexander Bertram	3,034	11.7	▼9.3	3,001	11.5	▼8.8
CDU	Sascha Lawrenz	2,956	11.4	▼1.2	3,028	11.6	▲0.2
FDP	Laila Marie Leiv	1,407	5.4		1,541	5.9	▲2.6
Tierschutzpartei	Jennifer Schrodt	1,352	5.2		844	3.2	▲0.6
PARTEI					662	2.5	▼0.1
FW	Burkhard Flader	480	1.8		301	1.1	
dieBasis	Katja Sirotkin	434	1.7		316	1.2	
The Grays					253	1.0	
Volt					237	0.9	
Gray Panthers					166	0.6	▼0.7
APT					137	0.5	
Pirates					130	0.5	▼1.4
Klimaliste					127	0.5	
Team Todenhöfer					119	0.5	
Verjüngungsforschung					105	0.4	▼0.4
Humanists					92	0.4	
Mieterpartei					88	0.3	
NPD					72	0.3	▼1.1
du.					67	0.3	
DKP					62	0.2	▼0.2
ÖDP					58	0.2	
Bildet Berlin!					49	0.2	
LKR	Bernd Stahlberg	55	0.2		39	0.1	▼0.4
The Pinks/Alliance 21					27	0.1	
Bergpartei, die ÜberPartei					23	0.1	
BüSo					16	0.1	▼0.1
SGP					10	0.0	▼0.1
Informal votes		376			231		
Total valid votes		26,008			26,203		
Turnout		26,486	74.7	▲10.1			
SPD hold	Majority	3,197	12.3				

== See also ==
- Politics of Berlin
- House of Representatives of Berlin
