= Lisa Pfitzmann =

German politician (born 1998)

- Pfitzmann in 2024

Member of the Berlin House of Representatives
- Assuming office 29 October 2026
- Succeeding: Lars Düsterhöft
- Constituency: Treptow-Köpenick 2

Personal details
- Born: 3 October 1998 (age 27)
- Party: Die Linke

Lisa Pfitzmann (born 3 October 1998) is a German politician who was elected member of the Berlin House of Representatives in 2026. From 2024 to 2026, she served as youth policy spokesperson of Die Linke.
