= Rawert =

Rawert is a surname. Notable people with the surname include:

- Jørgen Henrich Rawert (1751–1823), Danish architect
- Mechthild Rawert (born 1957), German politician
- Ole Jørgen Rawert (1786–1851), Danish civil servant and industrial historian
