= Ottilie Klein =

German politician

Ottilie Klein MdB
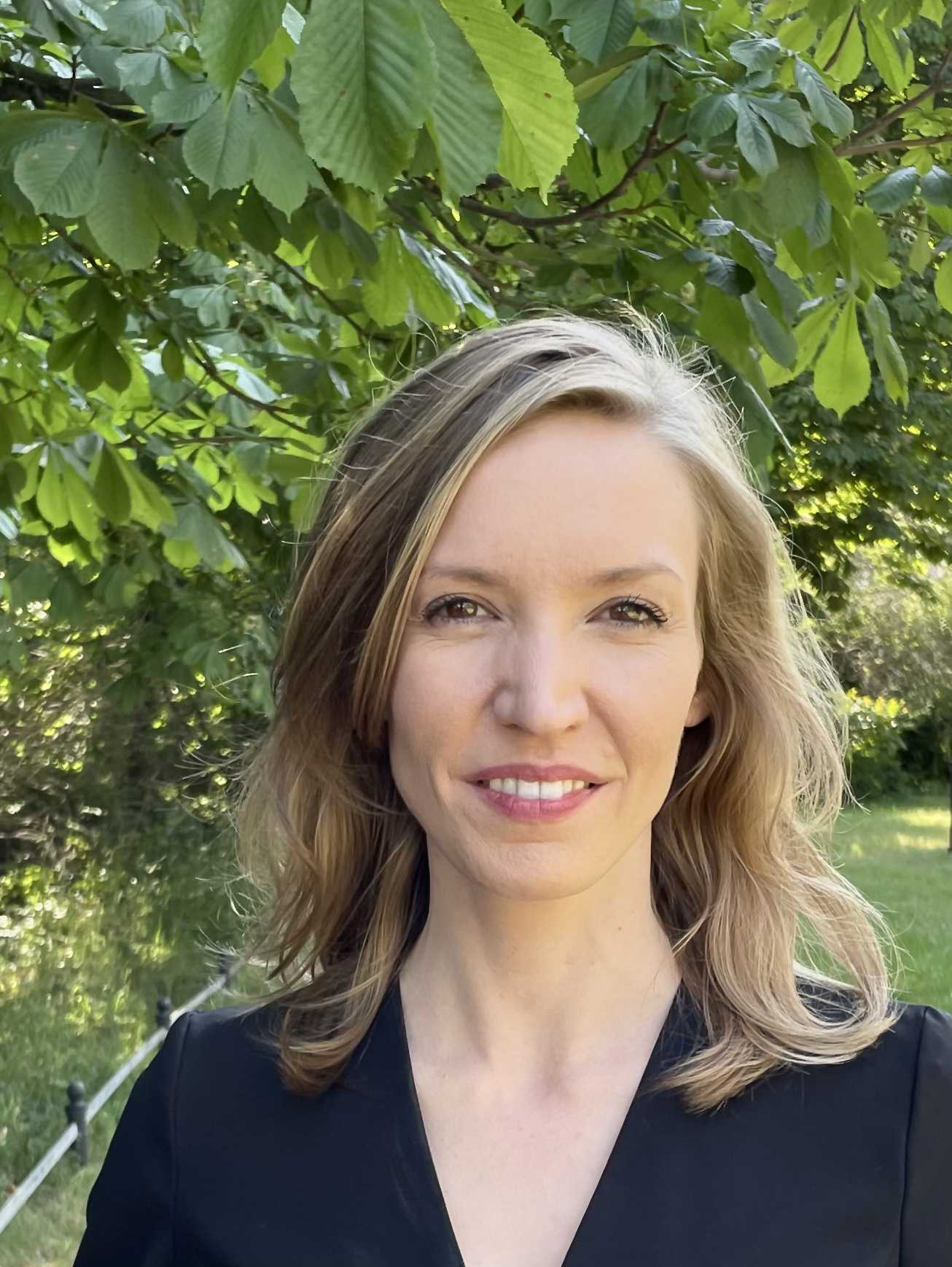
- Ottilie Klein in 2021

Member of the Bundestag
- Incumbent
- Assumed office 2021

Personal details
- Born: 14 February 1984 (age 42) Villingen-Schwenningen West Germany (now Germany)
- Party: CDU
- Education: University of Bonn; Mount Holyoke College; University of Oxford; University of Giessen; University of Helsinki

Ottilie Klein (born 14 February 1984) is a German politician of the Christian Democratic Union (CDU) who has been serving as a member of the Bundestag since 2021.

In addition to her parliamentary work, Klein served as secretary general of the CDU in Berlin from 2023 to 2026, under the leadership of it chair Kai Wegner.

== Early life and education ==
Klein was born to Russia Germans in the West German town of Villingen-Schwenningen. During her studies, she worked at the Alexander von Humboldt Foundation in 2007.

== Early career ==
In 2017, Klein briefly worked as a parliamentary advisor to Sybille Benning. She worked for the CDU's group in the State Parliament of Berlin, first as chief of staff to its successive chairs Florian Graf and Burkhard Dregger (2017–2020) and as the group's head of strategy and policy planning (2018–2020). From 2020 to 2021, Klein worked at the Association of German Public Banks (VÖB).

== Political career ==
Ahead of the 2021 elections, the CDU in Berlin voted Klein to the third place on its list, after Monika Grütters and Jan-Marco Luczak.

Klein was subsequently elected to the Bundestag in 2021, representing the Berlin-Mitte district. In parliament, she has since been serving on the Committee on Labour and Social Affairs and the Committee on European Affairs.

In the negotiations to form a coalition government between the CDU and the Social Democratic Party (SPD) under the leadership of Kai Wegner following Berlin's 2023 state elections, Klein co-chaired the working group on labour social affairs; her counterpart of the Social Democrats was Lars Düsterhöft.

== Other activities ==
- Otto Benecke Foundation, Member of the Board of Trustees
- Terre des Femmes, Member
- German Academic Scholarship Foundation, Member of the Selection Committee (–2022)

== Personal life ==
Klein practices kickboxing.
