= Luise Amtsberg =

German politician

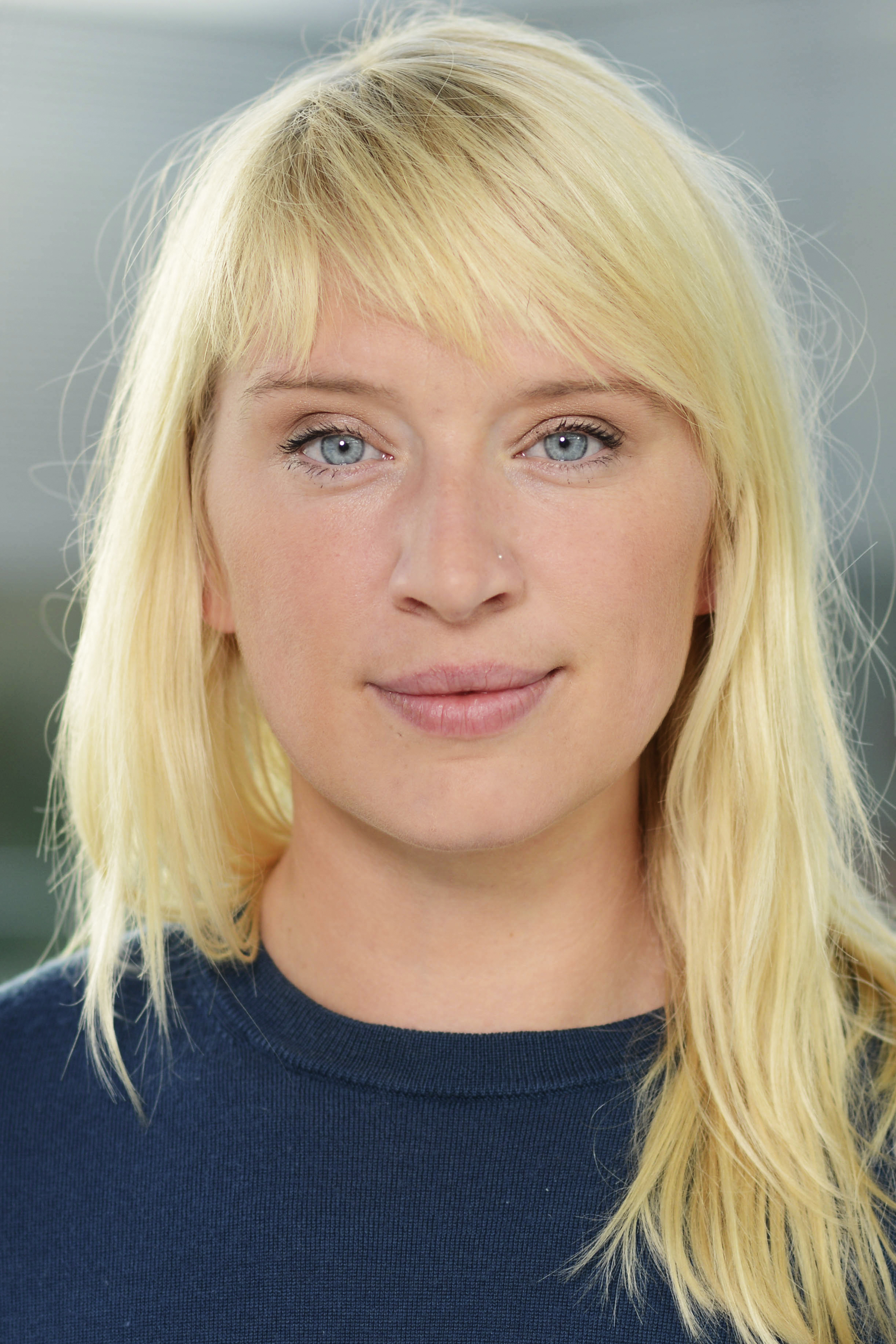

Federal Commissioner for Human Rights Policy and Humanitarian Assistance
- In office 5 January 2022 – May 2025
- Chancellor: Olaf Scholz
- Minister: Annalena Baerbock
- Preceded by: Bärbel Kofler
- Succeeded by: Lars Castellucci

Member of the Bundestag
- Incumbent
- Assumed office 22 October 2013
- Constituency: Kiel (since 2025)

Personal details
- Born: Luise von Jackowski; 17 October 1984 (age 42) Greifswald, East Germany
- Party: Alliance 90/The Greens Alliance 90/The Greens
- Education: University of Kiel
- Website: luise-amtsberg.de

Luise Amtsberg (née von Jackowski, born 17 October 1984) is a German politician of Alliance 90/The Greens who has been a member of the German Bundestag since the federal election in 2013. She has represented the constituency of Kiel since 2025.

In addition to her parliamentary work, Amtsberg served as the Federal Government Commissioner for Human Rights Policy and Humanitarian Assistance in the government of Chancellor Olaf Scholz from 2022 to 2025.

== Early life and education ==
Amtsberg grew up in the East Berlin district of Karlshorst. In 2004, she graduated from high school in Hemmoor, Lower Saxony.

From 2004 to 2013, Amtsberg studied Islamic Studies, Political Science and Theology at the Christian-Albrechts-University Kiel. During her studies, she served as AStA chairwoman from 2006. In 2013, she graduated with a master's thesis on feminism in Islam using the example of the Palestinian women's movement.

== Political career ==
From 2009 to 2012 Amtsberg was a member of the State Parliament of Schleswig-Holstein, where she served as her parliamentary group's spokesperson on refugees and Neo-Nazism. From 2012 to 2013, she served as chairwoman of the Kiel Greens.

In the 2013 elections, Amtsberg was elected into the Bundestag for the Green Party in Schleswig-Holstein via the party list, after being defeated in the constituency of Kiel with 10.0% of the vote. In parliament, she has been a member of the Committee on Internal Affairs since 2014. In this capacity, she is also her parliamentary group's spokesperson on refugees. From 2014 until 2017, she also served on the Committee on Petitions. In 2017, she ran again on the Green Party list in Schleswig-Holstein and was re-elected while receiving 14.3% of the vote in Kiel and being defeated.

In addition to her committee assignments, Amtsberg has been part of the German delegation to the Parliamentary Assembly of the Council of Europe since 2014. She has served as deputy chairwoman of the German-Turkish Parliamentary Friendship Group (since 2018) and the Parliamentary Friendship Group for Relations with Arabic-Speaking States in the Middle East, which is in charge of maintaining inter-parliamentary relations with Bahrain, Iraq, Yemen, Jordan, Qatar, Kuwait, Lebanon, Oman, Saudi Arabia, Syria, United Arab Emirates, and the Palestinian territories (2013–2017). She is also a member of the German-Egyptian Parliamentary Friendship Group and the Parliamentary Friendship Group for Relations with the Maghreb States.

In December 2014, Amtsberg and Katrin Göring-Eckardt visited the Zaatari refugee camp in Jordan to learn more about the plight of Syrians fleeing the violence in the ongoing Syrian civil war that erupted in 2011.

Under the umbrella of the German Parliaments' godparenthood program for human rights activists, Amtsberg has been raising awareness for the work of persecuted dissidents Narges Mohammadi of Iran, Günal Kurşun of Turkey, and Issa Amro of Palestine.

In the negotiations to form a so-called traffic light coalition of the Social Democratic Party (SPD), the Green Party and the Free Democrats (FDP) following the 2021 German elections, Amtsberg led her party's delegation in the working group on migration and integration; the co-chairs from the other parties were Boris Pistorius and Joachim Stamp.

After having contested the seat of Kiel in 2013, 2017 and 2021 without getting elected, Amtsberg finally won the seat with 26.0% of the vote in the 2025 election.

== Other activities ==
- German Federal Film Board (FFA), Member of the supervisory board (since 2022)
- Federal Foundation for the Reappraisal of the SED Dictatorship, Alternate Member of the Board of Trustees
- German-Arab Friendship Association (DAFG), Member of the Board
- Action Reconciliation Service for Peace (ASF), Member
- Pro Asyl, Member

== Personal life ==
Amtsberg is married. In 2016, she gave birth to a son. The family lives in Berlin.
