= Karin Thissen =

German politician (born 1960)

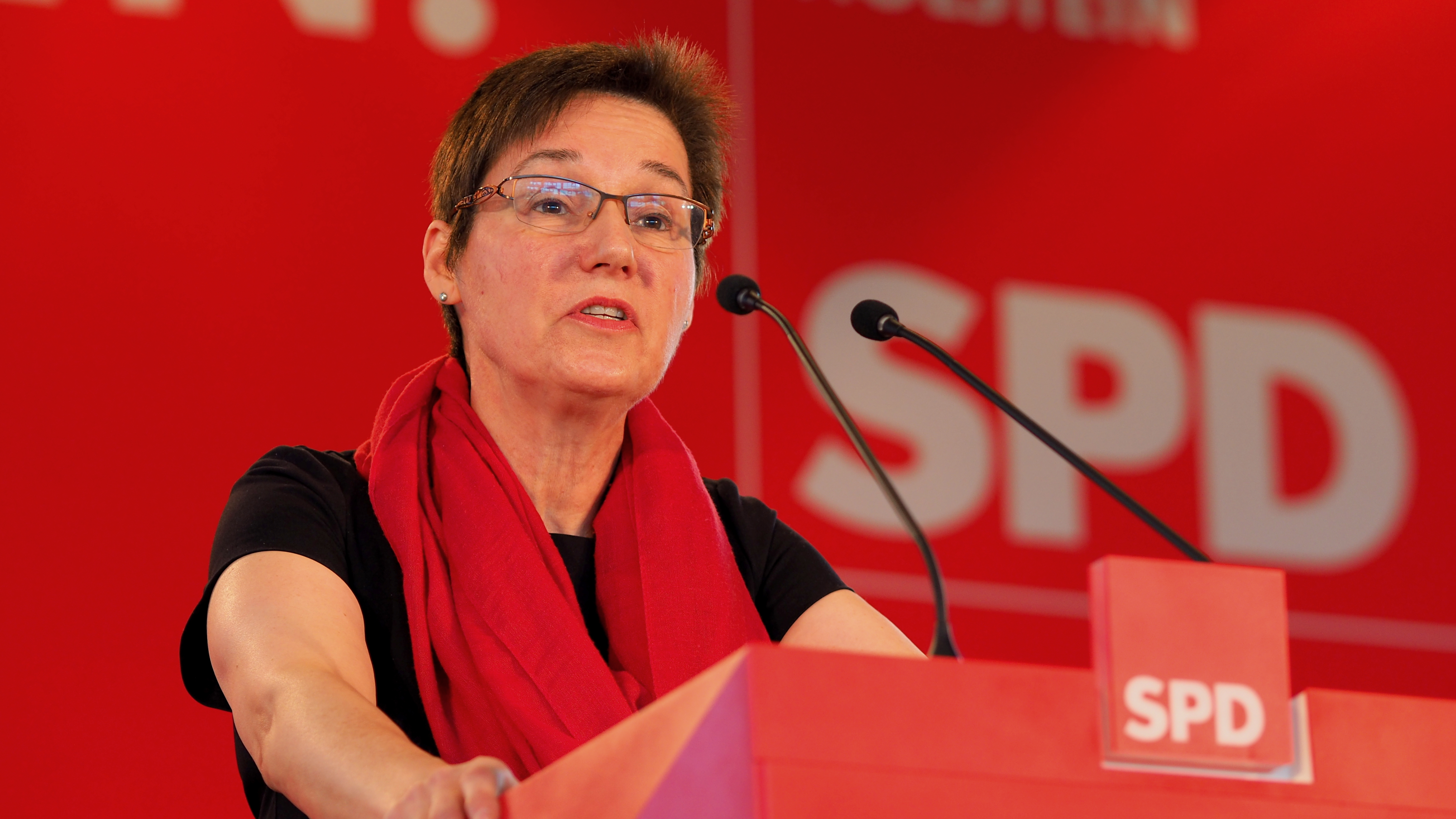

Membership in Bundestag committees (18th legislative period)

Committee on Food and Agriculture
- Incumbent
- Assumed office May 21, 2015

Committee on Health
- Incumbent
- Assumed office June 6, 2015

board of directors of the Sales Fund
- Incumbent
- Assumed office March 7, 2017

Personal details
- Born: July 5, 1960 (age 65) Neuss, Germany
- Party: SPD
- Education: University of Veterinary Medicine Hannover
- Occupation: Politician, veterinarian

Karin Thissen (born July 5, 1960, Neuss, Germany) is a German veterinarian and politician (Social Democratic Party of Germany SPD) who was a member of the Bundestag from 2015 to 2017.

== Biography ==
After graduating from the Helmholtz-Gymnasium in Bonn (West Germany) in 1978, she completed a voluntary social year in 1979.

From 1981, she studied veterinary medicine at the University of Veterinary Medicine in Hanover and graduated in 1987 with her license to practice medicine. From 1988 to 1990, she worked as an assistant veterinarian. In 1991, she opened a small animal practice, which she converted exclusively to animal behavior therapy in 2002. The acquisition of the additional title "Behavioral Science and Therapy" followed in 2003 – in 2008, the doctorate followed. From 1993 to 2015, she was an official veterinarian in the district of Steinburg until February 2014, and subsequently in the district of Borken until May 2015.

Karin Thissen is married, has four children and lives in Itzehoe.

== Political career ==
From 2008 to 2014, she was a member of the Itzehoe City Council for the SPD.

From 2013 to 2015, Thissen was deputy district chair until she took over as district chair of the SPD Steinburg in May 2015. Since 2013, she has been a member of the Schleswig-Holstein SPD state party council and deputy state chair of the working group of social democrats in the health sector.

In 2013, she was the direct candidate of the SPD Schleswig-Holstein for the federal election, but was defeated in her constituency by the CDU politician Mark Helfrich from Dägelingen, who achieved 45.4 percent. Thissen received 34.0 percent of the vote. However, on May 21, 2015, she succeeded Hans-Peter Bartels in the Bundestag, who was elected as a defense commissioner. In the Bundestag, she served as a full member of the Committee on Food and Agriculture.

In the 2017 Bundestag election, her state list position was not enough to re-enter the German Bundestag.
