= Hanna Steinmüller =

German politician (born 1993)

Hanna Steinmüller MdB
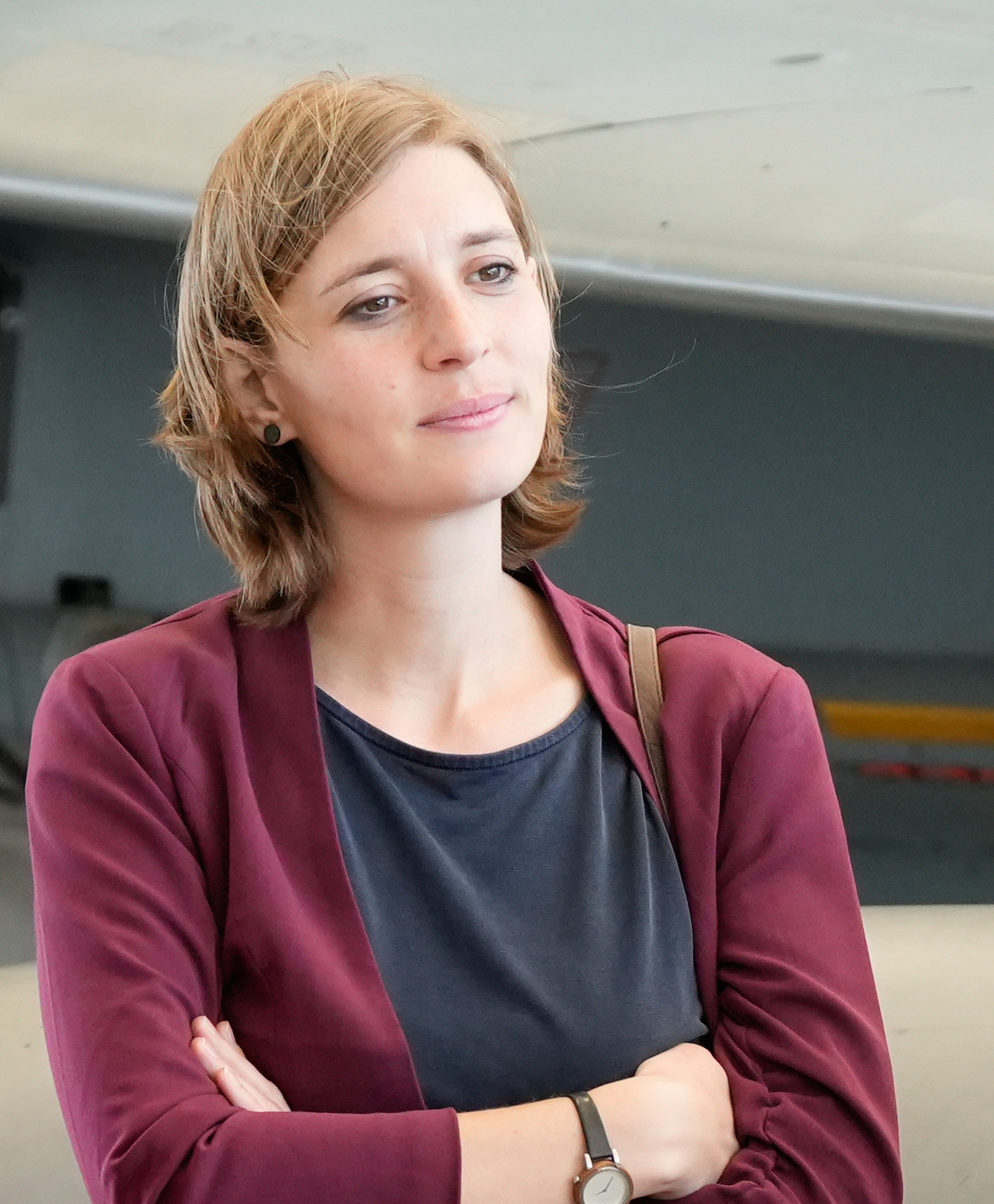
- Steinmüller in 2024

Member of the Bundestag; for Berlin-Mitte
- Incumbent
- Assumed office 26 October 2021
- Preceded by: Mechthild Rawert

Personal details
- Born: 9 April 1993 (age 33) Münster, Germany
- Party: Alliance 90/The Greens
- Children: 1
- Education: Humboldt University of Berlin

Hanna Skrollan Steinmüller (born 9 April 1993) is a German politician of the Alliance 90/The Greens who has been serving as a member of the Bundestag in the 2021 German federal election, representing the electoral district of Berlin-Mitte.

== Political career ==
In parliament, Steinmüller has been serving on the Committee on Housing, Urban Development, Building and Local Government. In this capacity, she is also her parliamentary group’s rapporteur on housing and urban development.

In addition to her committee assignments, Steinmüller is part of the German-Austrian Parliamentary Friendship Group and the German Parliamentary Friendship Group for Relations with the Baltic States.

In the negotiations to form a coalition government in Berlin under the prospective leadership of Elif Eralp following the 2026 state elections, Steinmüller was a member of her party’s delegation in the working group on urban development and housing.
