= Treptow-Köpenick 3 =

State electoral district of Germany

- Electoral district for the Berlin House of Representatives
- Treptow-Köpenick 3 in 2023
- District: Treptow-Köpenick
- Electorate: 29,817 (2026)

Current electoral district
- Party: SPD
- Member: Lars Düsterhöft

Treptow-Köpenick 3 is an electoral constituency (German: Wahlkreis) represented in the House of Representatives of Berlin. It elects one member via first-past-the-post voting.

== Geography ==
In 2023, the constituency comprised the districts of Aldershof and Altglienicke. It is entirely within the borough of Treptow-Köpenick.

There were 29,817 eligible voters in 2026.

== Members ==
Election	Member	Party	%
1995	Walter Kaczmarczyk	PDS	31.2
1999	Walter Kaczmarczyk	PDS	35.1
2001	Walter Kaczmarczyk	PDS	37.3
2006	Ellen Haußdörfer	SPD	33.7
2011	Ellen Haußdörfer	SPD	34.3
2016	Frank Scholtysek	AfD	23.8
2021	Ellen Haußdorfer	SPD	22.9
2023	Stefan Evers	CDU	32.7
2026	Lars Düsterhöft	SPD	26.0

== Election results ==
=== 2026 election ===
State election (2026): Treptow-Köpenick 3
Notes:	Blue background denotes the winner of the electorate vote. Pink background denotes a candidate elected from their party list. Yellow background denotes an electorate win by a list member, or other incumbent. A ✓ or ✗ denotes status of any incumbent, win or lose respectively.						
Party	Candidate	Votes	%	±%	Party votes	%	±%
SPD	Lars Düsterhöft	5,746	26.0	▼2.3	2,820	12.7	▼7.9
Left	Fabian Ulrich	5,480	24.8	▲10.3	5,973	26.9	▲12.4
AfD	Andreas Mehnert	4,836	21.9	▲8.6	5,035	22.7	▲9.5
CDU	Lukas Vennemann	2,477	11.2	▼13.3	3,036	13.7	▼11.8
Greens	Charlotte Steinmetz	1,538	6.9	▼3.1	2,134	9.6	▼2.0
BSW	Frank Unruh	1,167	5.3		1,356	6.1	
Tierschutzpartei					551	2.5	▼0.4
FDP	Jeanot Franke	412	1.9	▼1.1	473	2.1	▼1.4
Volt	Marie Louise Hägler	404	1.8		431	1.9	▲1.1
PARTEI					198	0.9	▼0.6
PdF					101	0.5	
DKP	Johannes Wullschläger	70	0.3		38	0.2	▼0.2
ÖDP					31	0.1	Steady
HEIMAT					30	0.1	▼0.1
du.					13	0.1	▼0.2
SGP					6	0.0	
Informal votes		391			295		
Total valid votes		22,130			22,226		
Turnout		22,521	75.5	▲10.6			
SPD gain from CDU	Majority	266	1.2				

=== 2023 repeat election ===
Changes denoted below for the 2023 election are compared to the 2016 election, as the 2021 election was declared invalid.

State election (2023): Treptow-Köpenick 3
Notes:	Blue background denotes the winner of the electorate vote. Pink background denotes a candidate elected from their party list. Yellow background denotes an electorate win by a list member, or other incumbent. A ✓ or ✗ denotes status of any incumbent, win or lose respectively.						
Party	Candidate	Votes	%	±%	Party votes	%	±%
CDU	Stefan Evers	7,022	32.7	▲14.5	6,587	30.6	▲15.1
SPD	Ellen Haußdörfer	4,082	19.0	▼3.1	3,733	17.4	▼2.6
AfD	✗ Frank Scholtysek	3,656	17.0	▼6.8	3,651	17.0	▼7.1
Left	Monika Belz	2,560	11.9	▼7.5	2,625	12.2	▼6.4
Greens	Claudia Schlaak	1,849	8.6	▲1.8	1,863	8.7	▲1.9
Tierschutzpartei	Kerstin Blanck	888	4.1		675	3.1	▲0.8
FDP	Joachim Schmidt	703	3.3	▼0.4	773	3.6	▼0.3
PARTEI	Jan-Peter Günter Heinz Zitzmann	411	1.9	▼0.7	298	1.4	▼0.5
The Grays					178	0.8	
Gray Panthers					143	0.7	▼0.9
Volt					127	0.6	
FW					112	0.5	
dieBasis	Hendrik Walther	171	0.8		106	0.5	
Team Todenhöfer					79	0.4	
Verjüngungsforschung					78	0.4	▼0.5
Pirates					74	0.3	▼1.0
Mieterpartei					67	0.3	
NPD	Andreas Pistor	66	0.3	▼1.3	56	0.3	▼1.2
Bildet Berlin!					51	0.2	
Humanists					45	0.2	
DKP					40	0.2	▼0.1
Klimaliste					40	0.2	
du.					32	0.1	
ÖDP					24	0.1	
LKR	Sabine Missler	30	0.1		15	0.1	▼0.4
Liberal Democrats (Germany) Liberal Democrats	Dieter Schulz	30	0.1				
The Pinks/Alliance 21					9	0.0	
SGP					6	0.0	▼0.1
BüSo					4	0.0	▼0.1
Bergpartei, die ÜberPartei					3	0.0	
Informal votes		229			199		
Total valid votes		21,468			21,494		
Turnout		21,727	61.3	▼5.1			
CDU gain from AfD	Majority	2,960	13.7				

=== 2021 election (annulled) ===
The election in 2021 was annulled and rerun in 2023.

State election (2021): Treptow-Köpenick 3
Notes:	Blue background denotes the winner of the electorate vote. Pink background denotes a candidate elected from their party list. Yellow background denotes an electorate win by a list member, or other incumbent. A ✓ or ✗ denotes status of any incumbent, win or lose respectively.						
Party	Candidate	Votes	%	±%	Party votes	%	±%
SPD	Ellen Haußdörfer	5,952	22.9	▲0.7	5,720	21.7	▲1.7
CDU	Stefan Evers	4,638	17.8	▼0.4	4,404	16.7	▲1.1
AfD	✗ Frank Scholtysek	4,036	15.5	▼8.3	3,926	14.9	▼9.2
Left	Monika Belz	3,828	14.7	▼4.7	3,911	14.8	▼3.8
Greens	Claudia Schlaak	2,696	10.4	▲3.5	2,594	9.8	▲3.0
FDP	Joachim Schmidt	1,853	7.1	▲3.4	1,920	7.3	▲3.3
Tierschutzpartei	Kerstin Blanck	1,178	4.5		824	3.1	▲0.8
FW	?	663	2.5		453	1.7	
PARTEI	Jan-Peter Günter Heinz Zitzmann	608	2.3	▼0.2	503	1.9	▲0.1
The Grays					338	1.3	
dieBasis	Hendrik Walther	381	1.5		302	1.1	
Gray Panthers					193	0.7	▼0.8
Volt					168	0.6	
APT					148	0.6	
Team Todenhöfer					143	0.5	
Verjüngungsforschung					127	0.5	▼0.3
Pirates					95	0.4	▼1.0
Mieterpartei					93	0.4	
NPD	Andreas Pistor	77	0.3	▼1.3	86	0.3	▼1.1
Klimaliste					73	0.3	
Humanists					69	0.3	
Bildet Berlin!					54	0.2	
LKR	Sabine Missler	68	0.3		53	0.2	▼0.3
du.					39	0.1	
DKP					39	0.1	▼0.2
ÖDP					36	0.1	
Liberal Democrats (Germany) Liberal Democrats	Dieter Schulz	28	0.1				
The Pinks/Alliance 21					25	0.1	
BüSo					12	0.0	▼0.1
Bergpartei, die ÜberPartei					8	0.0	
SGP					7	0.0	▼0.1
Informal votes		353			286		
Total valid votes		26,006			26,363		
Turnout		26,680	75.4	▲9.1			
SPD gain from AfD	Majority	1,314	5.1				

== See also ==
- Politics of Berlin
- House of Representatives of Berlin
