= Maximilian Mordhorst =

German politician (born 1996)

Maximilian Mordhorst (born 10 April 1996) is a German politician from the Free Democratic Party (FDP) who served as a Member of the Bundestag from Schleswig-Holstein from 2021 to 2025.

== Early life ==
He was born in Neumünster. He enrolled in the law program at the Christian-Albrechts-University of Kiel in 2015 but has, as of yet, not attained a degree. University of Kiel.

== Political career ==
At the 2021 federal election, Mordhorst stood in the constituency of Kiel but came in fourth place. He was elected on the state list.

== See also ==
- List of members of the 20th Bundestag
