= Annika Klose =

German politician (born 1992)

Annika Klose MdB

Member of the Bundestag
- Incumbent
- Assumed office 2021
- Constituency: Berlin-Mitte

Personal details
- Born: 24 June 1992 (age 34) Dortmund, Germany
- Party: SPD
- Education: Humboldt University of Berlin

Annika Gisela Klose (born 24 June 1992) is a German politician of the Social Democratic Party and a social scientist who has been serving as a member of the Bundestag since 2021.

== Early life and education ==
Klose was born 1992 in the German city of Dortmund, grew up in Clausthal-Zellerfeld and studied social sciences at Humboldt University Berlin.

== Political career ==
Klose joined the SPD in 2011. She became the regional leader of the Jusos in Berlin in 2015 and has been a member of the executive committee of the regional party in Berlin since 2016.

In December 2020, Klose was selected by the SPD Berlin-Mitte as a candidate for the Bundestag. In this context, she gave up her leadership of the Jusos Berlin and began her election campaign.

Klose was elected to the Bundestag in the 2021 elections via electoral list. She is representing Berlin-Mitte.

In parliament, Klose has been serving on the Committee on Labour and Social Affairs and the Committee on Petitions. At the beginning, she was a substitute member of the Committee on the Environment, Nature Conservation and Nuclear Safety, but switched to the Committee on Economic Cooperation and Development in the course of the legislative period. She is also her parliamentary group's rapporteur and co-negotiator on the Bürgergeld.

In the negotiations to form a Grand Coalition under the leadership of Friedrich Merz's Christian Democrats (CDU together with the Bavarian CSU) and the SPD following the 2025 German elections, Klose was part of the SPD delegation in the working group on labour and social affairs, led by Carsten Linnemann, Stephan Stracke and Katja Mast.

== Other activities ==
- German United Services Trade Union (ver.di), Member
- Amnesty International, Member
