= Mathias Stein =

German politician

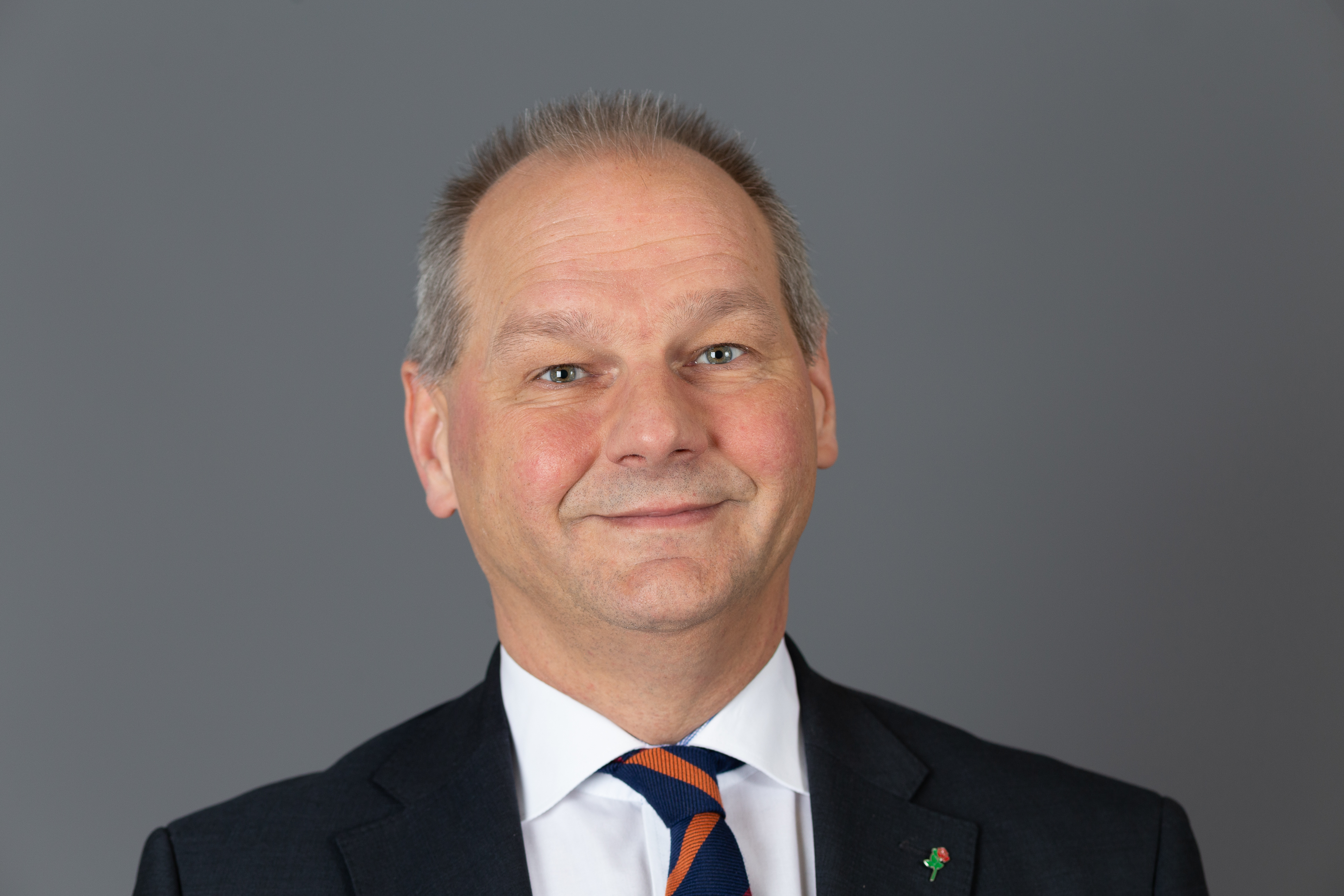
- Stein in 2020

Member of the Bundestag
- Incumbent
- Assumed office 2017

Personal details
- Born: 21 February 1970 (age 56) Kiel, West Germany (now Germany)
- Party: SPD

Mathias Stein (born 21 February 1970) is a German politician of the Social Democratic Party (SPD) who has been serving as a member of the Bundestag from the state of Schleswig-Holstein since 2017.

== Political career ==
Stein first became a member of the Bundestag in the 2017 German federal election. In parliament, he is a member of the Committee on Transport and Digital Infrastructure. He is his parliamentary group’s rapporteur on cycling.

Within his parliamentary group, Stein belongs to the Parliamentary Left, a left-wing movement.

In July 2024, Stein announced, that he isn't seeking re-election for Bundestag.

== Other activities ==
- German Cyclist’s Association (ADFC), Member
- German United Services Trade Union (ver.di), Member
