= Tobias Schulze =

German politician (born 1976)

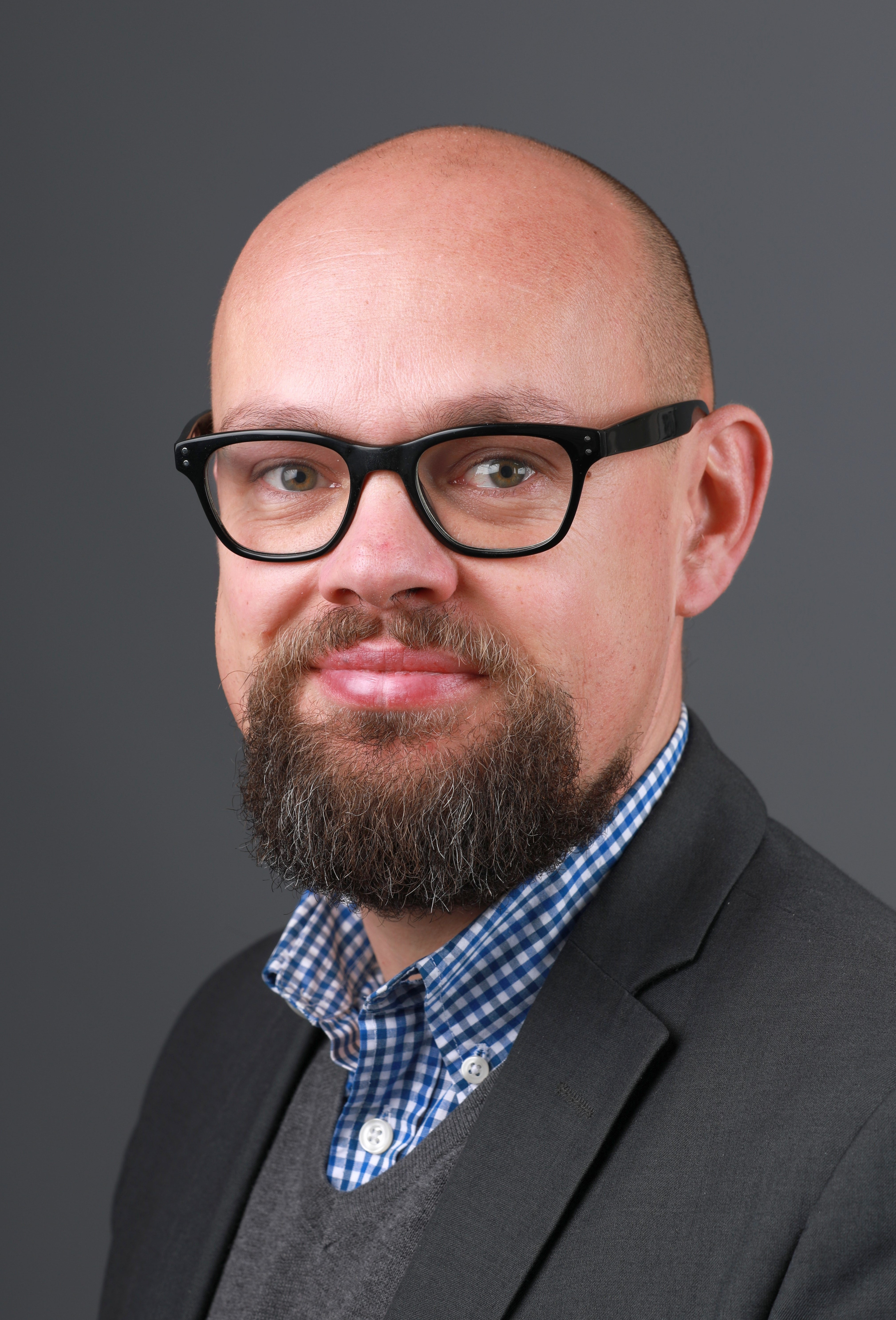
- Schulze in 2017

Member of the Abgeordnetenhaus of Berlin
- Incumbent
- Assumed office 27 October 2016

Personal details
- Born: 26 January 1976 (age 50) Wernigerode
- Party: Die Linke (since 2007)

Tobias Schulze (born 26 January 1976 in Wernigerode) is a German politician serving as a member of the Abgeordnetenhaus of Berlin since 2016. He has served as co-group leader of Die Linke since 2024.
