= Charlotte Steinmetz =

German politician (born 1994)

Member of the Berlin House of Representatives
- Incumbent
- Assumed office 29 October 2026

Personal details
- Born: 1994 (age 31–32)
- Party: Alliance 90/The Greens

Charlotte Steinmetz (born 1994) is a German politician who was elected member of the Berlin House of Representatives in 2026. From 2023 to 2026, she served as co-group leader of Alliance 90/The Greens in the borough council of Treptow-Köpenick.
