= Stella Merendino =

German politician (born 1994)

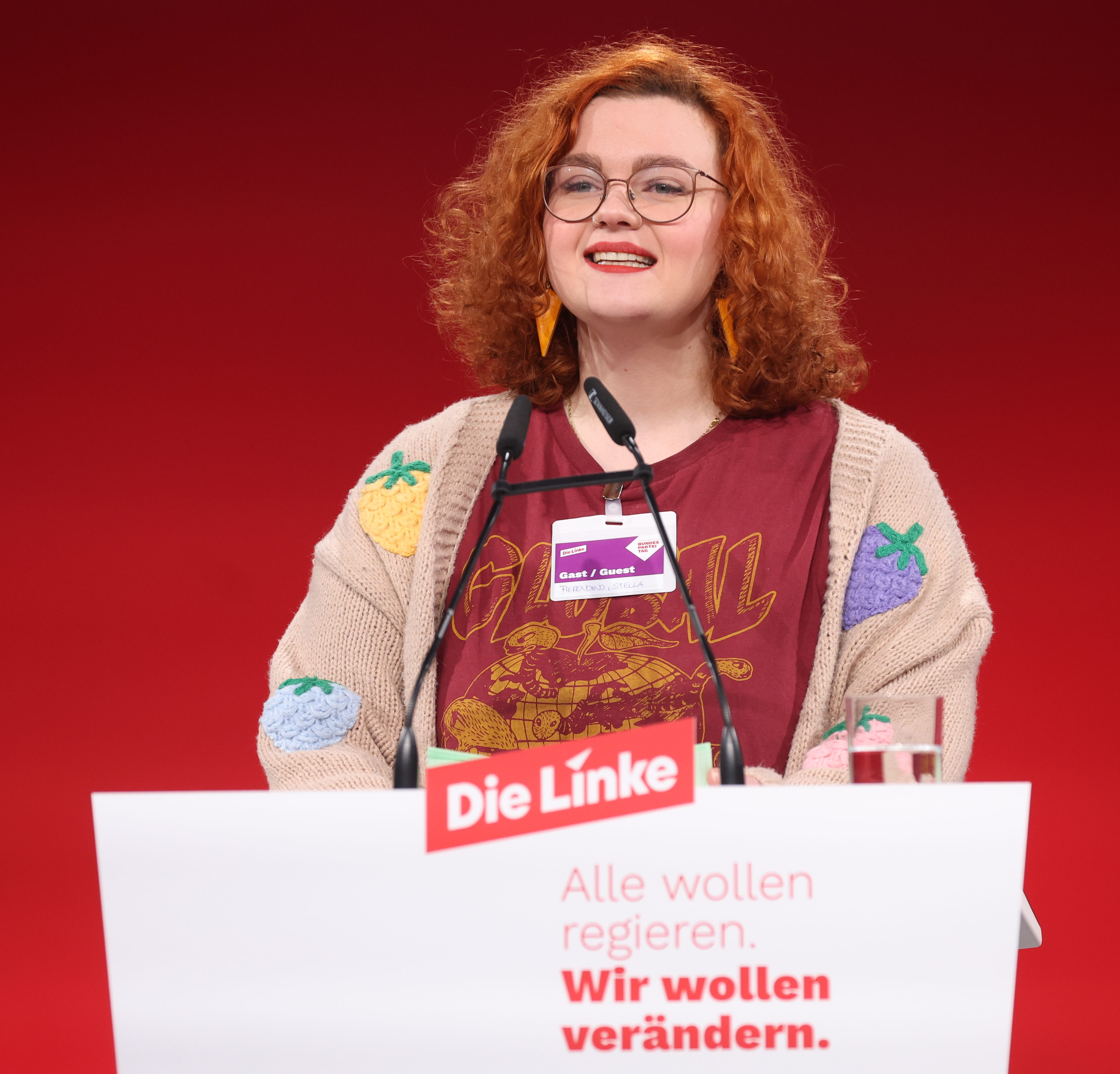
- Stella Merendino in 2025

Member of the Bundestag from Berlin
- Incumbent
- Assumed office 2025

Personal details
- Born: Ottavia Stella Merendino; 8 April 1994 (age 32) Gdańsk, Poland
- Party: Die Linke

Ottavia Stella Merendino (born 8 April 1994) is a German politician. She is a member of the Left Party and was elected to the Bundestag in the 2025 German federal election.

== Life ==
Stella Merdendino was born on 8 April 1994, in Gdańsk, Poland. and grew up in Wedding. Her mother is Polish and her father is Italian. Merendino worked as a nurse in the emergency room at Vivantes Humboldt Hospital. As a nurse, she was active in the ver.di union campaign for more staff in the emergency room (Tarifvertrag Entlastung). In 2021, she began a part-time degree programme in "Advanced Clinical Nursing with a Focus on Emergency Nursing".

== Political life ==
In 2023, Stella Merendino joined Die Linke after attacks on nursing staff at her hospital. In addition to health policy, tenant protection is also an issue for Merendino. She sees housing as a fundamental right, and demands that rents be reduced, and that a nationwide rent cap be introduced. In December 2024, her candidacy for the Bundestag in Berlin-Mitte was announced. In the federal election of February 2025, she was elected to the Bundestag via the state list. Her candidacy was supported by Brand New Bundestag.
