= Berlin-Mitte (electoral district) =

Electoral district

74 Berlin-Mitte
- Electoral district for the Bundestag
- Berlin-Mitte in 2025
- State: Berlin
- Population: 377,400 (2019)
- Electorate: 207,445 (2025)
- Area: 39.4 km^{2}

Current electoral district
- Created: 2002
- Party: GRÜNE
- Member: Hanna Steinmüller
- Elected: 2021, 2025

Berlin-Mitte is an electoral constituency (German: Wahlkreis) represented in the Bundestag. It elects one member via first-past-the-post voting. Under the current constituency numbering system, it is designated as constituency 74. It is located in central Berlin, comprising the Mitte borough.

Berlin-Mitte was created for the 2002 federal election. Since 2021, it has been represented by Hanna Steinmüller of the Alliance 90/The Greens.

== Geography ==
Berlin-Mitte is located in central Berlin. As of the 2021 federal election, it is coterminous with the Mitte borough.

== History ==
Berlin-Mitte was created in 2002 and contained parts of the abolished constituencies of Berlin-Tiergarten – Wedding – Nord-Charlottenburg and Berlin-Mitte – Prenzlauer Berg. In the 2002 through 2009 elections, it was constituency 76 in the numbering system. In the 2013 through 2021 elections, it was number 75. From the 2025 election, it has been number 74. Its borders have not changed since its creation.

== Members ==
The constituency was first represented by Jörg-Otto Spiller of the Social Democratic Party (SPD) from 2002 to 2009. Eva Högl was elected in 2009, and re-elected in 2013 and 2017. She resigned in May 2020 after being appointed Parliamentary Commissioner for the Armed Forces. Hanna Steinmüller won the constituency for the Greens in 2021 and retained it narrowly in 2025.

Election	Member	Party	%
2002	Jörg-Otto Spiller	SPD	41.3
2005	Jörg-Otto Spiller	SPD	41.9
2009	Eva Högl	SPD	26.0
2013	Eva Högl	SPD	28.2
2017	Eva Högl	SPD	23.5
2021	Hanna Steinmüller	GRÜNE	30.5
2025	Hanna Steinmüller	GRÜNE	25.3

== Election results ==
=== 2025 election ===
Federal election (2025): Berlin-Mitte
Notes:	Blue background denotes the winner of the electorate vote. Pink background denotes a candidate elected from their party list. Yellow background denotes an electorate win by a list member, or other incumbent. A ✓ or ✗ denotes status of any incumbent, win or lose respectively.						
Party	Candidate	Votes	%	±%	Party votes	%	±%
Greens	✓ Hanna Steinmüller	40,672	25.3	▼5.3	34,920	21.7	▼8.9
Left	Stella Merendino	38,521	24.0	▲9.7	43,614	27.1	▲13.0
SPD	Annika Klose	26,816	16.7	▼5.4	24,189	15.0	▼5.8
CDU	Lasse Hansen	22,933	14.3	▲0.4	21,678	13.5	▲1.6
AfD	Jens-Hermann Priegnitz	13,706	8.5	▲3.0	14,291	8.9	▲3.3
BSW	Sevim Dağdelen	8,012	5.0	New	9,794	6.1	New
FDP	Andreas Schaumayer	4,586	2.9	▼3.2	6,422	4.0	▼4.0
Volt					1,786	1.1	▲0.2
Tierschutzpartei	Elke Weihusen	1,808	1.1	▼0.8	1,558	1.0	▼0.8
PARTEI	Martin Pohlmann	1,485	0.9	▼1.1	973	0.6	▼1.0
Team Todenhöfer	Omar El-Zein	749	0.5	New	526	0.3	▼1.7
MERA25	Melanie Schweizer	658	0.4	New	389	0.2	New
FW	Alexander Freitag	471	0.3	New	297	0.2	▼0.4
PdF					218	0.1	New
BD	Johannes Braun	201	0.1	New	168	0.1	New
MLPD	Annegret Höcker	131	0.1	▼0.1	85	0.1	0.0
SGP	Christoph Vandreier	73	0.0	New	55	0.0	0.0
BüSo					50	0.0	0.0
Informal votes		1,043			879		
Total valid votes		160,822			160,986		
Turnout		161,865	78.0	▲10.1			
Greens hold	Majority	2,151	1.3	▼6.5			

=== 2021 election ===
Federal election (2021): Berlin-Mitte
Notes:	Blue background denotes the winner of the electorate vote. Pink background denotes a candidate elected from their party list. Yellow background denotes an electorate win by a list member, or other incumbent. A ✓ or ✗ denotes status of any incumbent, win or lose respectively.						
Party	Candidate	Votes	%	±%	Party votes	%	±%
Greens	Hanna Steinmüller	45,870	30.5	▲12.6	46,120	30.7	▲13.5
SPD	Annika Klose	34,072	22.7	▼0.8	32,133	21.4	▲3.4
Left	Martin Neise	21,291	14.2	▼6.3	20,820	13.8	▼7.6
CDU	Ottilie Klein	20,002	13.3	▼5.2	16,856	11.2	▼7.2
FDP	Anna Kryszan	10,038	6.7	▲0.6	13,186	8.8	▲0.1
AfD	Beatrix von Storch	7,597	5.1	▼2.8	7,734	5.1	▼3.1
Team Todenhöfer					3,262	2.2	
PARTEI	Martin Pohlmann	2,958	2.0	▼1.6	2,390	1.6	▼1.0
Tierschutzpartei	Georg Daniel Tsambasis	2,810	1.9		2,568	1.7	▲0.5
dieBasis	Ulrike Fischer	2,146	1.4				
Volt	Valerie Sternberg-Mottaghi Irvani	1,492	1.0		1,356	0.9	
Die Grauen					875	0.6	▲0.3
FW					848	0.6	▲0.3
Pirates	Torsten Schwald	836	0.6		599	0.4	▼0.4
Humanists	Juliane Mörsel	416	0.3		345	0.2	
du.					264	0.2	0.0
Gesundheitsforschung					235	0.2	0.0
ÖDP	Richard Borrmann	200	0.1	▼0.3	204	0.1	0.0
DKP					199	0.1	0.0
V-Partei3					126	0.1	▼0.1
NPD					85	0.1	
MLPD	Annegret Höcker	196	0.1	▼0.1	83	0.1	▼0.1
Independent	Ayman Zebian	155	0.1				
LKR	Rudolf Fritz	70	0.0		47	0.0	
Independent	Michael Fielsch	61	0.0				
SGP					44	0.0	0.0
BüSo					40	0.0	0.0
Informal votes		2,296			2,087		
Total valid votes		150,210			150,419		
Turnout		152,506	73.5	▲0.3			
Greens gain from SPD	Majority	11,798	7.8				

=== 2017 election ===
Federal election (2017): Berlin-Mitte
Notes:	Blue background denotes the winner of the electorate vote. Pink background denotes a candidate elected from their party list. Yellow background denotes an electorate win by a list member, or other incumbent. A ✓ or ✗ denotes status of any incumbent, win or lose respectively.						
Party	Candidate	Votes	%	±%	Party votes	%	±%
SPD	✓ Eva Högl	35,036	23.5	▼4.8	26,788	17.9	▼8.2
Left	Stephan Rauhut	30,492	20.5	▲3.8	32,118	21.5	▲2.8
CDU	Frank Henkel	27,654	18.6	▼5.3	27,861	18.6	▼4.0
Greens	Özcan Mutlu	26,781	18.0	▼0.5	25,708	17.2	▲0.5
AfD	Beatrix von Storch	11,782	7.9	▲4.9	12,289	8.2	▲4.3
FDP	Katharina Ziolkowski	9,017	6.0	▲4.5	12,972	8.7	▲5.0
PARTEI	Lea Joy Friedel	5,342	3.6	▲2.3	3,811	2.6	▲1.3
Tierschutzpartei					1,777	1.2	
Pirates					1,229	0.8	▼3.9
DiB					919	0.6	
BGE					836	0.6	
Independent	Michael Fielsch	766	0.5				
Die Grauen					492	0.3	
DM					372	0.2	
ÖDP	Tim-Oliver Kray	715	0.5		272	0.2	0.0
FW	Markus Krätzschmar	648	0.4	▲0.3	336	0.2	0.0
du.					294	0.2	
V-Partei³					273	0.2	
Gesundheitsforschung					260	0.2	
Menschliche Welt					254	0.2	
MLPD	Mohamad Tawil	360	0.2	▲0.1	172	0.1	0.0
DKP					167	0.1	
B*					100	0.1	
SGP	Andreas Niklaus	275	0.2		66	0.0	0.0
BüSo	Helga Zepp-LaRouche	203	0.1	0.0	77	0.1	▼0.1
Informal votes		2,341			1,969		
Total valid votes		149,071			149,443		
Turnout		151,412	73.2	▲3.9			
SPD hold	Majority	4,544	3.0	▼1.4			

=== 2013 election ===
Federal election (2013): Berlin-Mitte
Notes:	Blue background denotes the winner of the electorate vote. Pink background denotes a candidate elected from their party list. Yellow background denotes an electorate win by a list member, or other incumbent. A ✓ or ✗ denotes status of any incumbent, win or lose respectively.						
Party	Candidate	Votes	%	±%	Party votes	%	±%
SPD	✓ Eva Högl	39,360	28.3	▲2.3	36,403	26.1	▲4.9
CDU	Philipp Lengsfeld	33,265	23.9	▲1.9	31,544	22.6	▲3.7
Greens	Özcan Mutlu	25,687	18.4	▼3.1	23,329	16.7	▼5.3
Left	Klaus Lederer	23,200	16.7	▼2.4	26,068	18.7	▼0.5
Pirates	Therese Lehnen	5,463	3.9		6,608	4.7	▲0.6
AfD	Beatrix von Storch	4,212	3.0		5,443	3.9	
FDP	Hartmut Bade	2,088	1.5	▼5.3	5,134	3.7	▼6.7
PARTEI	David Hamann	1,856	1.3		1,686	1.2	
NPD	Richard Miosga	1,363	1.0	▼0.6	1,234	0.9	▼0.3
Independent	Ralph Boes	1,053	0.8				
BIG	Selcuk Bulat	479	0.3		473	0.3	
Independent	Sylla	347	0.2				
ÖDP					319	0.2	0.0
FW	Furat Mohammed	239	0.2		304	0.2	
PRO					292	0.2	
DKP					261	0.2	
REP					198	0.1	▼0.3
BüSo	Daniel Köppen	217	0.2	▼0.6	144	0.1	▼0.1
MLPD	Annegret Höcker	202	0.1		145	0.1	0.0
PSG					76	0.1	0.0
Informal votes		2,282			2,174		
Total valid votes		139,292			139,400		
Turnout		141,574	69.4	▲1.8			
SPD hold	Majority	6,095	4.4	▲0.4			

=== 2009 election ===
Federal election (2009): Berlin-Mitte
Notes:	Blue background denotes the winner of the electorate vote. Pink background denotes a candidate elected from their party list. Yellow background denotes an electorate win by a list member, or other incumbent. A ✓ or ✗ denotes status of any incumbent, win or lose respectively.						
Party	Candidate	Votes	%	±%	Party votes	%	±%
SPD	Eva Högl	33,943	26.0	▼15.9	27,780	21.2	▼13.5
CDU	Christian Burholt	28,760	22.0	▼1.2	24,854	19.0	▼0.4
Greens	Wolfgang Wieland	28,108	21.5	▲7.6	28,880	22.0	▲3.9
Left	Klaus Lederer	24,871	19.0	▲5.2	25,216	19.2	▲4.2
FDP	Kurt Lehner	8,869	6.8	▲3.1	13,590	10.4	▲2.8
Pirates					5,450	4.2	
Independent	Ralph Boes	2,301	1.8				
Tierschutzpartei					1,576	1.2	
NPD	Cornelia Berger	2,110	1.6	▲0.4	1,530	1.2	0.0
Independent	Ali Kamburoglu	693	0.5				
DIE VIOLETTEN					527	0.4	
REP					519	0.4	▼0.4
BüSo	Helga Zepp-LaRouche	951	0.7	0.0	329	0.3	▲0.1
ÖDP					245	0.2	
DKP					167	0.1	
DVU					129	0.1	
PSG					116	0.1	0.0
MLPD					107	0.1	0.0
Informal votes		2,749			2,340		
Total valid votes		130,606			131,015		
Turnout		133,355	67.6	▼6.3			
SPD hold	Majority	5,183	4.0	▼14.7			

=== 2005 election ===
Federal election (2005):Berlin-Mitte
Notes:	Blue background denotes the winner of the electorate vote. Pink background denotes a candidate elected from their party list. Yellow background denotes an electorate win by a list member, or other incumbent. A ✓ or ✗ denotes status of any incumbent, win or lose respectively.						
Party	Candidate	Votes	%	±%	Party votes	%	±%
SPD	✓ Jörg-Otto Spiller	58,445	41.9	▲0.6	48,550	34.7	▼2.2
CDU	Volker Liepelt	32,321	23.2	▼1.5	27,047	19.3	▼3.9
Greens	Wolfgang Wieland	19,375	13.9	▲1.1	25,309	18.1	▼0.9
Left	Tobias Schulze	19,271	13.8	▲0.9	20,989	15.0	▲5.1
FDP	Tim Stuchtey	5,188	3.7	▼1.1	10,527	7.5	▲1.3
GRAUEN					2,789	2.0	▲1.2
NPD	Gordon Reinholz	1,757	1.3		1,625	1.2	▲0.8
REP	Peter Warnst	1,331	1.0	▼0.1	1,084	0.8	▼0.2
BüSo	Ulrike Lillge	1,010	0.7	▲0.5	263	0.2	▲0.1
Independent	Erwin Jäkel	663	0.5				
PARTEI					615	0.4	
Feminist					549	0.4	0.0
APPD					242	0.2	
SGP					115	0.1	
MLPD					81	0.1	
Informal votes		2,829			2,405		
Total valid votes		139,361			139,785		
Turnout		141,190	73.9	▼0.8			
SPD hold	Majority	26,124	18.7				
