= Hans-Peter Bartels =

German politician

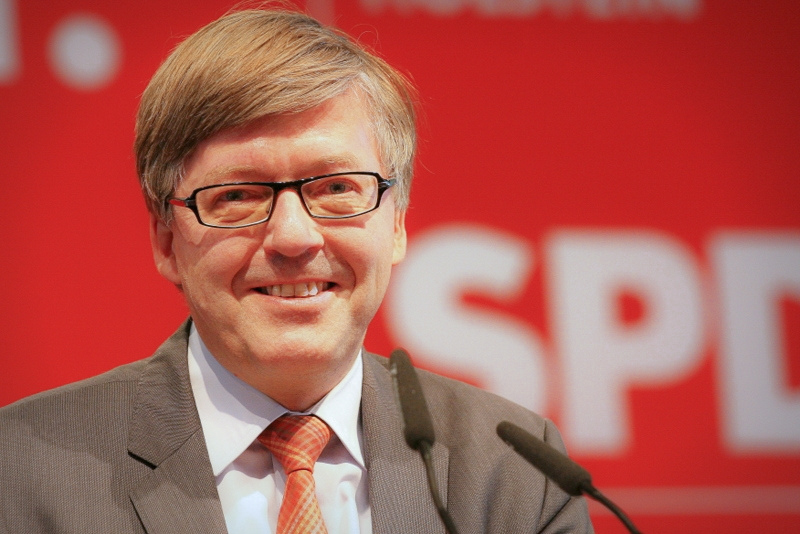

Parliamentary Commissioner for the Armed Forces
- In office 21 May 2015 – 21 May 2020
- President: Norbert Lammert; Wolfgang Schäuble
- Preceded by: Hellmut Königshaus
- Succeeded by: Eva Högl

Member of the Bundestag for Kiel
- In office 27 September 1998 – 20 May 2015
- Preceded by: Norbert Gansel
- Succeeded by: Karin Thissen

Personal details
- Born: 7 May 1961 (age 65) Düsseldorf, West Germany
- Party: SPD
- Spouse: Susanne Gaschke
- Education: University of Kiel
- Website: hans-peter-bartels.de

Hans-Peter Bartels (born 7 May 1961) is a German politician of the SPD who served as member of the Bundestag for Kiel. From 2015 until 2020, he was the Parliamentary Commissioner for the Armed Forces.

== Political career ==
Bartels has been a member of the German Bundestag since the 1998 federal election. He has since been serving on the Defence Committee. In addition, he was a member of the Committee on Family Affairs, Senior Citizens, Women and Youth between 1998 and 2002.

During his tenure as Member of the German Bundestag, Bartels was a member of the Defence Committee. He currently serves as advisory member of the Commission for Fundamental Values of the Executive Committee of the SPD, a body led by Gesine Schwan.

== Political positions ==
=== Domestic security ===
Bartels has in the past opposed proposals to use the armed force in the event of coordinated terror attacks on a German city, arguing that “police tasks are not the military’s responsibility.“

=== Relations with the African continent ===
Bartels has in the past voted in favor of German participation in United Nations peacekeeping missions as well as in United Nations-mandated European Union peacekeeping missions on the African continent, such as in Somalia – both Operation Atalanta (2010, 2011, 2013 and 2014) and EUTM Somalia (2015) –, Darfur/Sudan (2009, 2010, 2011, 2012, 2013 and 2014), South Sudan (2011, 2012, 2013 and 2014), Mali – both EUTM Mali (2014 and 2015) and MINUSMA (2013 and 2014) –, and the Central African Republic (2014). In 2013, he abstained from the votes on extending the mandate for participation in EUTM Somalia and EUTM Mali, and he voted against the participation in Operation Atalanta in 2012.

In 2020, Bartels complained about the poor data situation on right-wing extremism in the troops and called it “curious” that he, as the military commissioner, was the only one who could give figures on the phenomenon. He saw the MAD as having a duty because the Bundeswehr had to notice when “enemies of the constitution invaded”. A one-time re-election of Bartels after five years would have been possible, but the SPD parliamentary group decided against him, as its chairman Rolf Mützenich announced at the end of April 2020 without giving any reasons. Bartel's wife Gaschke then left the SPD. Eva Högl was elected as military representative on May 7, 2020.

== Other activities ==
- Berliner Republik, Co-Editor
- German Maritime Academy (DMA), Member of the Advisory Board
- German Seaman's Mission (DSM), Member
- Leo Baeck Foundation, Member of the Board of Trustees
- Federal Agency for Civic Education, Member of the Board of Trustees (2002-2005)
