= Eva Högl =

German politician

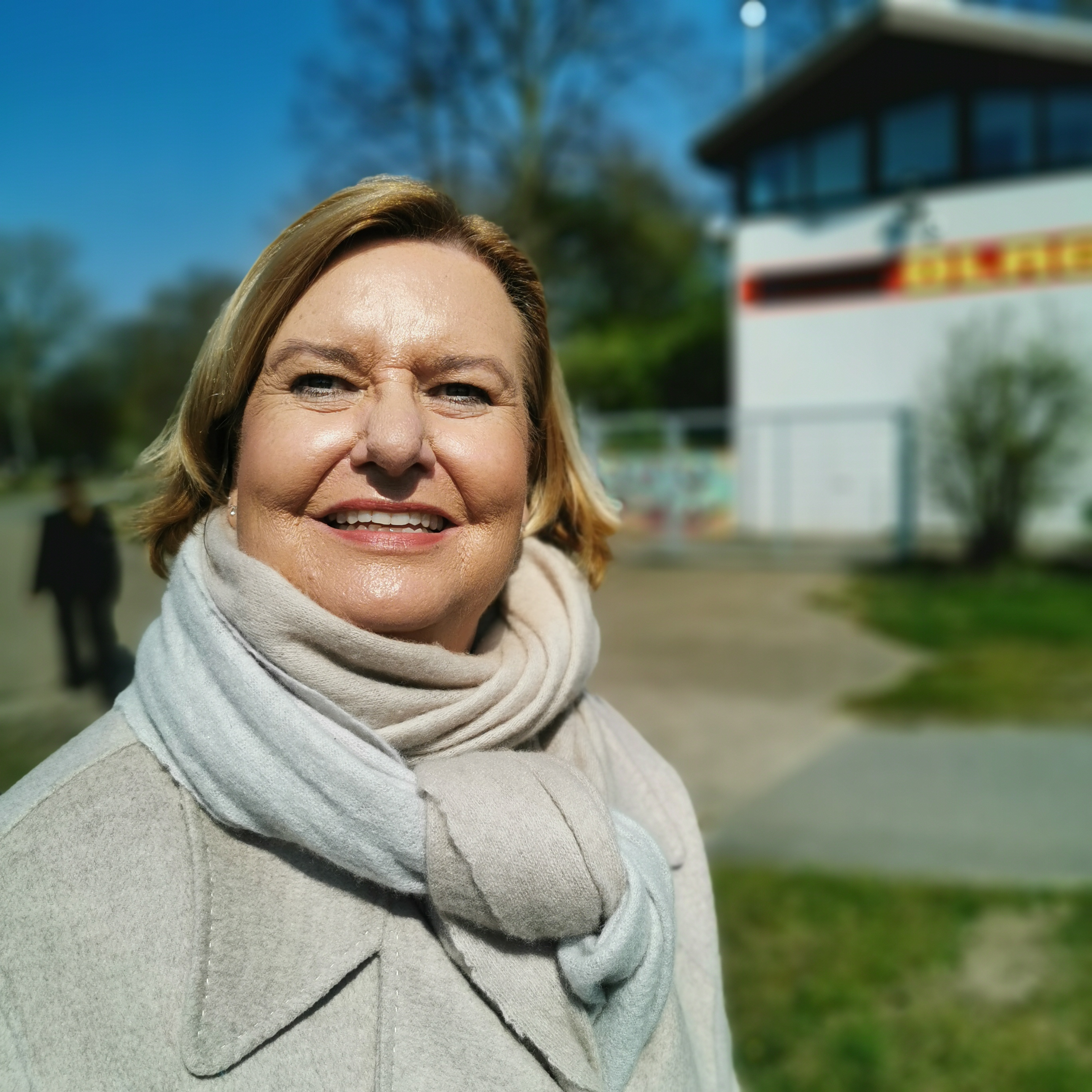
- Högl in 2026

Senator for the Interior and Sports of Bremen
- Incumbent
- Assumed office 11 December 2025
- Mayor: Andreas Bovenschulte
- Preceded by: Ulrich Mäurer

Armed Forces Commissioner of the Bundestag
- In office 28 May 2020 – 21 May 2025
- Nominated by: SPD
- President: Wolfgang Schäuble; Bärbel Bas
- Preceded by: Hans-Peter Bartels
- Succeeded by: Henning Otte

Chair of the Edathy scandal Inquiry Committee
- In office 2 July 2014 – 12 November 2015
- Deputy: Michael Frieser
- Preceded by: Position established
- Succeeded by: Position abolished

Deputy Leader of the Social Democratic Party in the Bundestag
- In office 22 October 2013 – 28 May 2020 Serving with Hubertus Heil, Axel Schäfer, Christine Lambrecht, Sören Bartol, Karl Lauterbach, Rolf Mützenich, Carola Reimann, Carsten Schneider, Ute Vogt, Katja Mast, Matthias Miersch, Achim Post, Bärbel Bas, Gabriela Heinrich
- Leader: Thomas Oppermann; Andrea Nahles; Rolf Mützenich
- Preceded by: Christine Lambrecht
- Succeeded by: Dirk Wiese

Member of the Bundestag
- In office 12 January 2009 – 25 May 2020
- Preceded by: Ditmar Staffelt
- Succeeded by: Mechthild Rawert
- Constituency: Berlin-Neukölln (2009); Berlin-Mitte (2009–2020)

Personal details
- Born: Eva Alexandra Ingrid Irmgard Anna Kampmeyer; 6 January 1969 (age 57) Osnabrück, West Germany
- Party: Social Democratic (since 1987)
- Education: Leiden University; Osnabrück University (Dr. jur.)
- Occupation: Politician; Academic; Civil Servant
- Website: Official website; Bundestag Commissioner website

Eva Alexandra Ingrid Irmgard Anna Högl (German pronunciation: [ˈeːfa ˈhøːɡl̩]; née Kampmeyer; born 6 January 1969) is a German politician of the Social Democratic Party (SPD) who has been serving as the Senator for the Interior and Sports of Bremen since 11 December 2025.

Högl previously served as Parliamentary Commissioner for the Armed Forces of Germany from 2020 to 2025. She was a member of the Bundestag, the German parliament, from 2009 until 2020. From 2013 until 2020, she served as deputy chairwoman of the SPD parliamentary group. She has been a member of her party since 1987.

== Early career ==
Högl was born in Osnabrück. From 1999 until 2009, she worked at the Federal Ministry of Labour and Social Affairs (BMAS) in Berlin. At the ministry, she was head of the unit in charge of European labor and social policy between 2006 and 2009.

== Political career ==
=== Career in state politics ===
Since 2007, Högl has been a member of the executive board of the SPD in Berlin, under the leadership of party chairman Michael Müller. Before the 2008 elections in Lower Saxony, candidate Wolfgang Jüttner included Högl in his shadow cabinet for the Social Democrats' – unsuccessful – campaign to unseat incumbent Minister-President Christian Wulff. During the campaign, she served as shadow minister for regional development and European affairs.

=== Member of Parliament (2009–2020) ===
Högl was elected to the German Bundestag in 2009, representing the constituency of Berlin-Mitte. In her first full legislative term from 2009 until 2013, she was a member of the Committee on Legal Affairs and the Committee on European Affairs. On the latter committee, she was her parliamentary group's rapporteur on the 2010 European Union directive on the rights to interpretation and to translation in criminal proceedings. In addition to her committee assignments, she served as deputy chairwoman of the German-Dutch Parliamentary Friendship Group from 2010 until 2013. Within the SPD parliamentary group, she was a member of the working group on municipal policy from 2009 until 2017.

In the negotiations to form a Grand Coalition of Chancellor Angela Merkel's Christian Democrats (CDU together with the Bavarian CSU) and the SPD following the 2013 federal elections, Högl was part of the SPD delegation in the working group on families, women and equality, led by Annette Widmann-Mauz and Manuela Schwesig.

From December 2013 until May 2020, Högl served as deputy chairwoman of the SPD parliamentary group under the leadership of successive chairpersons Thomas Oppermann (2013–2017), Andrea Nahles (2017–2019) and Rolf Mützenich (2019–2020). In addition, she was appointed to the Committee on the Election of Judges (Wahlausschuss), which is in charge of appointing judges to the Federal Constitutional Court of Germany. She also served on the parliamentary body in charge of appointing judges to the Highest Courts of Justice, namely the Federal Court of Justice (BGH), the Federal Administrative Court (BVerwG), the Federal Fiscal Court (BFH), the Federal Labour Court (BAG), and the Federal Social Court (BSG). In 2019, she joined the Parliamentary Oversight Panel (PKGr), which provides parliamentary oversight of Germany's intelligence services BND, BfV and MAD.

In the negotiations to form a fourth coalition government under Merkel following the 2017 federal elections, Högl was part of the working group on migration and integration, led by Volker Bouffier, Joachim Herrmann and Ralf Stegner.

=== Parliamentary Commissioner for the Armed Forces (2020–2025) ===
In May 2020 Högl was appointed Parliamentary Commissioner for the Armed Forces of Germany and gave up her seat in the Bundestag. Her seat was taken up by Mechthild Rawert.

=== Senator for the Interior and Sports of Bremen (2025–present) ===
After Senator for the Interior and Sports of Bremen Ulrich Mäurer announced his resignation in August 2025, Högl was elected as his successor by the Bürgerschaft of Bremen on 11 December 2025.

== Other activities ==
=== Corporate boards ===
- Berliner Stadtreinigung (BSR), Member of the Advisory Board

=== Non-profit organizations ===
- Leo Baeck Foundation, Member of the Board of Trustees (since 2022)
- Psychologische Hochschule Berlin (PHB), Member of the Board of Trustees
- German-Arab Friendship Association (DAFG), Member of the Advisory Board
- Europäische Akademie für Frauen in Politik und Wirtschaft Berlin, Member of the Board of Trustees
- Friedrich Ebert Foundation (FES), Member
- Conciliation Board of the Federal Bar Association, Member of the Advisory Board
- Willy Brandt Center Jerusalem, Member
- German Foundation for International Legal Cooperation (IRZ), Member (since 2014)
- Gegen Vergessen – Für Demokratie, Member
- Europa-Union Deutschland, Member
- German United Services Trade Union (ver.di), Member
- Pro Asyl, Member
- Transparency International, Member
- Memorial to the Murdered Jews of Europe Foundation, Member of the Board of Trustees (-2020)

== Political positions ==
Högl has been a vocal proponent of banning the extreme rightwing National Democratic Party of Germany (NPD), arguing that a ban would "hit the party as an organisation and also stop it being financed by taxpayers".

Högl has also demanded improved voting rights for foreigners living in Germany.

== Personal life ==
Högl is married to an architect. The couple resides in Berlin's Wedding district, in the same building as Peer Steinbrück.
