= Lars Düsterhöft =

German politician (born 1981)

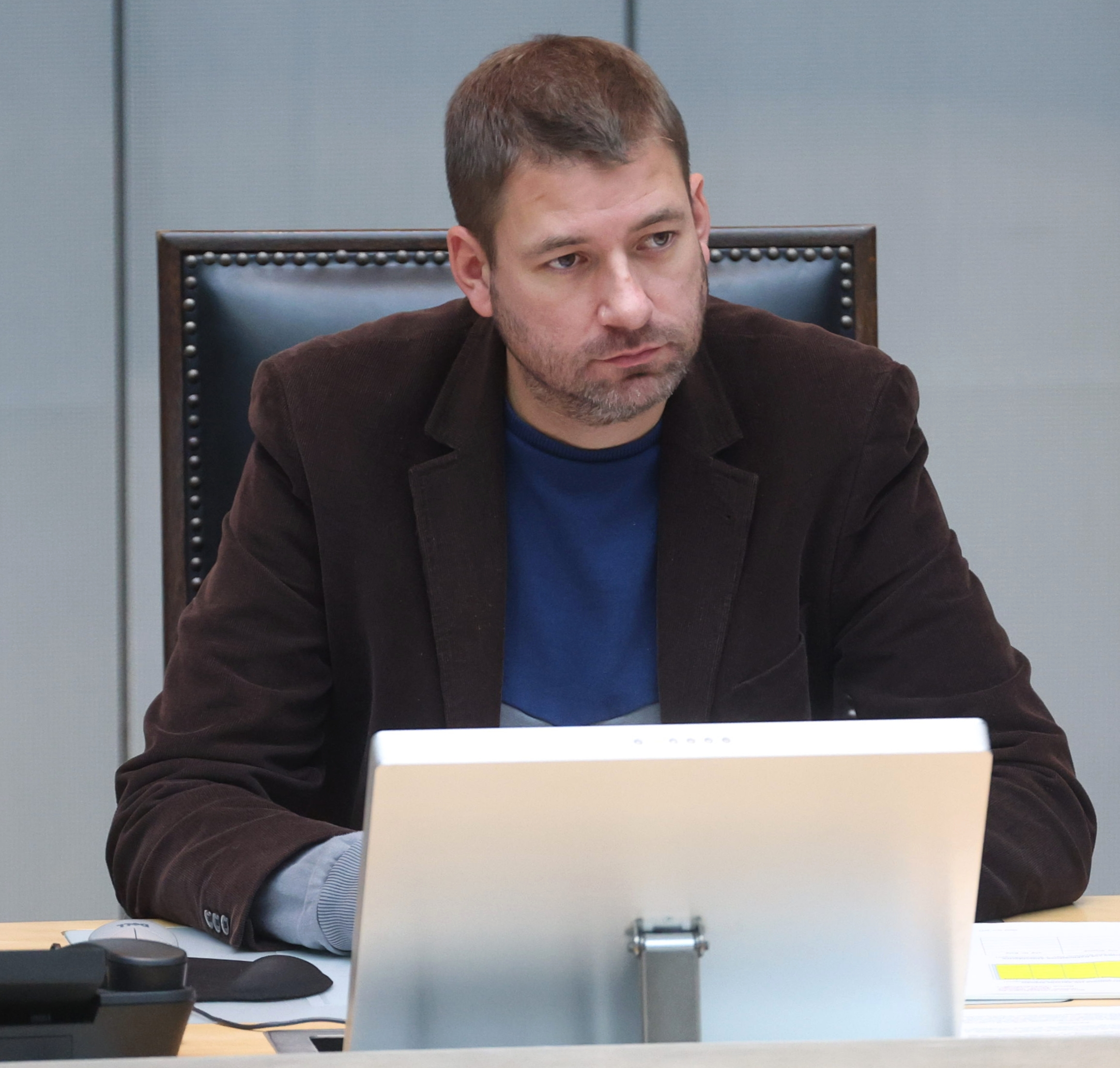
- Düsterhöft in 2024

Member of the Berlin House of Representatives
- Incumbent
- Assumed office 27 October 2016
- Preceded by: Karlheinz Nolte
- Constituency: Treptow-Köpenick 2

Personal details
- Born: 8 December 1981 (age 44)
- Party: Social Democratic Party

Lars Düsterhöft (born 8 December 1981) is a German politician serving as a member of the Berlin House of Representatives since 2016. From 2013 to 2016, he served as chief of staff to Matthias Schmidt.
