= Mainz (electoral district) =

Federal electoral district of Germany

204 Mainz
- Electoral district for the Bundestag
- Mainz in 2025
- State: Rhineland-Palatinate
- Population: 353,600 (2019)
- Electorate: 251,092 (2025)
- Major settlements: Mainz; Ingelheim am Rhein; Bingen am Rhein
- Area: 467.3 km^{2}

Current electoral district
- Created: 1949
- Member: Vacant
- Elected: 2025

Mainz is an electoral constituency (German: Wahlkreis) represented in the Bundestag. It elects one member via first-past-the-post voting. Under the current constituency numbering system, it is designated as constituency 204. It is located in eastern Rhineland-Palatinate, comprising the city of Mainz and the northern part of the Mainz-Bingen district.

Mainz was created for the inaugural 1949 federal election. Whilst the Christian Democratic Union won the plurality in the 2025 election, under the new voting system, their candidate did not actually win a seat in the Bundestag. This was due to the distribution of seats won by the CDU being decided by the first (direct) vote percentage of each winning CDU candidate, determining who took the seats. As the CDU candidate got a low vote of 27.3%, the seat will remain vacant throughout the 21st Bundestag.

== Geography ==
Mainz is located in eastern Rhineland-Palatinate. As of the 2021 federal election, it comprises the independent city of Mainz as well as the municipalities of Bingen am Rhein, Budenheim, and Ingelheim am Rhein and the Verbandsgemeinden of Gau-Algesheim, Nieder-Olm, and Rhein-Nahe from the Mainz-Bingen district.

== History ==
Mainz was created in 1949. In the 1949 election, it was Rhineland-Palatinate constituency 9 in the numbering system. In the 1953 through 1976 elections, it was number 156. In the 1980 through 1998 elections, it was number 154. In the 2002 election, it was number 208. In the 2005 election, it was number 207. In the 2009 and 2013 elections, it was number 206. In the 2017 and 2021 elections, it was number 205. From the 2025 election, it has been number 204.

Originally, the constituency comprised the city of Mainz and the districts of Bingen and Landkreis Mainz excluding the Amtsgerichtsbezirk of Oppenheim. In the 1972 through 2013 elections, it acquired a configuration very similar to its current borders, but including the Verbandsgemeinde of Sprendlingen-Gensingen. It acquired its current borders in the 2017 election.

Election	No.	Name	Borders
1949	9	Mainz	Mainz city; Landkreis Mainz district (excluding Oppenheim Amtsgerichtsbezirk); Bingen district
1953	156	Mainz	Mainz city; Landkreis Mainz district (excluding Oppenheim Amtsgerichtsbezirk); Bingen district
1957	156	Mainz	Mainz city; Landkreis Mainz district (excluding Oppenheim Amtsgerichtsbezirk); Bingen district
1961	156	Mainz	Mainz city; Landkreis Mainz district (excluding Oppenheim Amtsgerichtsbezirk); Bingen district
1965	156	Mainz	Mainz city; Landkreis Mainz district (excluding Oppenheim Amtsgerichtsbezirk); Bingen district
1969	156	Mainz	Mainz city; Landkreis Mainz district (excluding Oppenheim Amtsgerichtsbezirk); Bingen district
1972	156	Mainz	Mainz city; Mainz-Bingen district (only Bingen am Rhein, Budenheim, and Ingelheim am Rhein municipalities and the Gau-Algesheim, Nieder-Olm, Rhein-Nahe, and Sprendlingen-Gensingen Verbandsgemeinden)
1976	156	Mainz	Mainz city; Mainz-Bingen district (only Bingen am Rhein, Budenheim, and Ingelheim am Rhein municipalities and the Gau-Algesheim, Nieder-Olm, Rhein-Nahe, and Sprendlingen-Gensingen Verbandsgemeinden)
1980	154	Mainz	Mainz city; Mainz-Bingen district (only Bingen am Rhein, Budenheim, and Ingelheim am Rhein municipalities and the Gau-Algesheim, Nieder-Olm, Rhein-Nahe, and Sprendlingen-Gensingen Verbandsgemeinden)
1983	154	Mainz	Mainz city; Mainz-Bingen district (only Bingen am Rhein, Budenheim, and Ingelheim am Rhein municipalities and the Gau-Algesheim, Nieder-Olm, Rhein-Nahe, and Sprendlingen-Gensingen Verbandsgemeinden)
1987	154	Mainz	Mainz city; Mainz-Bingen district (only Bingen am Rhein, Budenheim, and Ingelheim am Rhein municipalities and the Gau-Algesheim, Nieder-Olm, Rhein-Nahe, and Sprendlingen-Gensingen Verbandsgemeinden)
1990	154	Mainz	Mainz city; Mainz-Bingen district (only Bingen am Rhein, Budenheim, and Ingelheim am Rhein municipalities and the Gau-Algesheim, Nieder-Olm, Rhein-Nahe, and Sprendlingen-Gensingen Verbandsgemeinden)
1994	154	Mainz	Mainz city; Mainz-Bingen district (only Bingen am Rhein, Budenheim, and Ingelheim am Rhein municipalities and the Gau-Algesheim, Nieder-Olm, Rhein-Nahe, and Sprendlingen-Gensingen Verbandsgemeinden)
1998	154	Mainz	Mainz city; Mainz-Bingen district (only Bingen am Rhein, Budenheim, and Ingelheim am Rhein municipalities and the Gau-Algesheim, Nieder-Olm, Rhein-Nahe, and Sprendlingen-Gensingen Verbandsgemeinden)
2002	208	Mainz	Mainz city; Mainz-Bingen district (only Bingen am Rhein, Budenheim, and Ingelheim am Rhein municipalities and the Gau-Algesheim, Nieder-Olm, Rhein-Nahe, and Sprendlingen-Gensingen Verbandsgemeinden)
2005	207	Mainz	Mainz city; Mainz-Bingen district (only Bingen am Rhein, Budenheim, and Ingelheim am Rhein municipalities and the Gau-Algesheim, Nieder-Olm, Rhein-Nahe, and Sprendlingen-Gensingen Verbandsgemeinden)
2009	206	Mainz	Mainz city; Mainz-Bingen district (only Bingen am Rhein, Budenheim, and Ingelheim am Rhein municipalities and the Gau-Algesheim, Nieder-Olm, Rhein-Nahe, and Sprendlingen-Gensingen Verbandsgemeinden)
2013	206	Mainz	Mainz city; Mainz-Bingen district (only Bingen am Rhein, Budenheim, and Ingelheim am Rhein municipalities and the Gau-Algesheim, Nieder-Olm, Rhein-Nahe, and Sprendlingen-Gensingen Verbandsgemeinden)
2017	205	Mainz	Mainz city; Mainz-Bingen district (only Bingen am Rhein, Budenheim, and Ingelheim am Rhein municipalities and the Gau-Algesheim, Nieder-Olm, and Rhein-Nahe Verbandsgemeinden)
2021	205	Mainz	Mainz city; Mainz-Bingen district (only Bingen am Rhein, Budenheim, and Ingelheim am Rhein municipalities and the Gau-Algesheim, Nieder-Olm, and Rhein-Nahe Verbandsgemeinden)
2025	204	Mainz	Mainz city; Mainz-Bingen district (only Bingen am Rhein, Budenheim, and Ingelheim am Rhein municipalities and the Gau-Algesheim, Nieder-Olm, and Rhein-Nahe Verbandsgemeinden)

== Members ==
The constituency was first represented by Joseph Schmitt of the Christian Democratic Union (CDU) from 1949 to 1953, followed by Josef Schlick from 1953 to 1965. Josef Hofmann then served a single term. Hugo Brandt of the Social Democratic Party (SPD) was elected in 1969 and served until 1983. Johannes Gerster of the CDU won the constituency in 1983 and was representative until 1994. Hans-Otto Wilhelm then served a single term. Eckhart Pick of the SPD was elected in 1998 and served until 2002, when he was succeeded by Michael Hartmann. Ute Granold of the CDU was representative from 2009 to 2013. Ursula Groden-Kranich was elected in 2013 and re-elected in 2017. Daniel Baldy won the constituency for the SPD in 2021. The seat became vacant as a result of the 2025 election.

Election	Member	Party	%
1949	Joseph Schmitt	CDU	39.3
1953	Josef Schlick	CDU	44.6
1957	Josef Schlick	CDU	48.0
1961	Josef Schlick	CDU	43.6
1965	Josef Hofmann	CDU	44.5
1969	Hugo Brandt	SPD	46.4
1972	Hugo Brandt	SPD	52.3
1976	Hugo Brandt	SPD	46.0
1980	Hugo Brandt	SPD	46.6
1983	Johannes Gerster	CDU	49.0
1987	Johannes Gerster	CDU	45.1
1990	Johannes Gerster	CDU	43.1
1994	Hans-Otto Wilhelm	CDU	41.2
1998	Eckhart Pick	SPD	43.6
2002	Michael Hartmann	SPD	41.2
2005	Michael Hartmann	SPD	40.9
2009	Ute Granold	CDU	36.3
2013	Ursula Groden-Kranich	CDU	40.1
2017	Ursula Groden-Kranich	CDU	35.7
2021	Daniel Baldy	SPD	24.9
2025	Vacant (Note: Ursula Groden-Kranich (CDU) won with 27.3% but seat remained vacant due to insufficient second votes cover.)		

== Election results ==
=== 2025 election ===
Under the new voting system implemented for the 2025 election, although the CSU candidate won the most votes in this constituency, due to the low winning percentage, the constituency seat will remain vacant as not enough second (party) votes were won to be allocated this seat.

Federal election (2025): Mainz
Notes:	Blue background denotes the winner of the electorate vote. Pink background denotes a candidate elected from their party list. Yellow background denotes an electorate win by a list member, or other incumbent. A ✓ or ✗ denotes status of any incumbent, win or lose respectively.						
Party	Candidate	Votes	%	±%	Party votes	%	±%
CDU	Ursula Groden-Kranich	57,971	27.3	▲3.7	56,549	26.5	▲5.3
Greens	Thorsten Becherer	40,617	19.1	▲0.4	44,146	20.7	▼2.2
SPD	✗ Daniel Baldy	50,411	23.7	▼1.2	39,496	18.5	▼8.2
Left	Gerhard Trabert	19,431	9.1	▼3.3	23,596	11.1	▲6.4
AfD	Patric Berges	21,665	10.2	▲5.0	23,043	10.8	▲5.4
FDP	David Dietz	8,031	3.8	▼3.4	10,914	5.1	▼6.4
BSW	Stephan Falk	4,957	2.3	New	7,041	3.3	New
Volt	Luca Kraft	4,078	1.9	▲0.9	2,768	1.3	▲0.4
FW	Thomas Müller	3,039	1.4	▼0.9	2,045	1.0	▼0.8
Tierschutzpartei					1,772	0.8	▼0.2
PARTEI	Dirk Augstein	1,454	0.7	▼0.2	973	0.5	▼0.3
ÖDP	Lukas Leinen	1,033	0.5	▼0.2	648	0.3	▼0.2
BD					181	0.1	New
MLPD					50	<0.1	0.0
Informal votes		1,917			1,382		
Total valid votes		212,687			213,222		
Turnout		214,604	85.5	▲4.3			
Vacant gain from SPD	Majority						

=== 2021 election ===
Federal election (2021): Mainz
Notes:	Blue background denotes the winner of the electorate vote. Pink background denotes a candidate elected from their party list. Yellow background denotes an electorate win by a list member, or other incumbent. A ✓ or ✗ denotes status of any incumbent, win or lose respectively.						
Party	Candidate	Votes	%	±%	Party votes	%	±%
SPD	Daniel Baldy	49,878	24.9	▼3.1	53,889	26.8	▲4.8
CDU	✗ Ursula Groden-Kranich	47,153	23.6	▼12.1	42,659	21.2	▼11.5
Greens	Tabea Rößner	37,319	18.7	▲7.8	46,183	22.9	▲9.8
Left	Gerhard Trabert	24,863	12.4	▲6.0	9,418	4.7	▼3.9
FDP	Klaus Sartorius	14,408	7.2	▲0.3	23,178	11.5	▲0.3
AfD	Sebastian Münzenmaier	10,360	5.2	▼2.1	10,833	5.4	▼2.8
FW	Gerhard Wenderoth	4,751	2.4	▲1.3	3,605	1.8	▲1.0
Tierschutzpartei					2,025	1.0	
Volt	Florian Köhler-Langes	2,133	1.1		1,741	0.9	
dieBasis	Jörg Heuser	2,093	1.0		1,979	1.0	
PARTEI	Daniela Zaun	1,841	0.9	▼0.6	1,600	0.8	▼0.4
Team Todenhöfer					1,255	0.6	
ÖDP	Michael Ruf	1,444	0.7	▼0.5	1,029	0.5	▼0.4
Independent	Sebastian Seiffert	1,396	0.7				
Pirates	Bodo Noeske	1,118	0.6	▼0.2	970	0.5	▼0.1
Independent	Markus Heil	758	0.4				
Humanists	David Kaufmann	486	0.2		320	0.2	
V-Partei3					219	0.1	▼0.1
DiB					171	0.1	
NPD					109	0.1	▼0.1
LKR					67	0.0	
MLPD					38	0.0	0.0
Informal votes		2,669			1,382		
Total valid votes		200,001			201,288		
Turnout		202,670	81.2	▼0.2			
SPD gain from CDU	Majority	2,725	1.3				

=== 2017 election ===
Federal election (2017): Mainz
Notes:	Blue background denotes the winner of the electorate vote. Pink background denotes a candidate elected from their party list. Yellow background denotes an electorate win by a list member, or other incumbent. A ✓ or ✗ denotes status of any incumbent, win or lose respectively.						
Party	Candidate	Votes	%	±%	Party votes	%	±%
CDU	✓ Ursula Groden-Kranich	71,535	35.7	▼4.4	65,713	32.7	▼5.7
SPD	Carsten Kühl	56,184	28.0	▼6.8	44,203	22.0	▼4.5
Greens	Tabea Rößner	21,685	10.8	▲0.6	26,415	13.1	▼0.2
AfD	Sebastian Münzenmaier	14,542	7.3		16,535	8.2	▲3.7
FDP	David Dietz	13,813	6.9	▲1.9	22,608	11.3	▲4.7
Left	Martin Malcherek	12,904	6.4	▲2.1	17,148	8.5	▲3.0
PARTEI	Bernd Föhr	2,963	1.5		2,486	1.2	
ÖDP	Wilhelm Schild	2,355	1.2	▲0.2	1,755	0.9	▲0.2
FW	Gerhard Wenderoth	2,111	1.1	▼0.3	1,506	0.7	0.0
Pirates	René Pickhardt	1,504	0.8	▼1.9	1,195	0.6	▼1.9
V-Partei³					512	0.3	
Independent	Bernhard Heck	486	0.2				
BGE					481	0.2	
NPD					260	0.1	▼0.4
New Liberals	Jim Preuß	237	0.1				
MLPD					62	0.0	0.0
Informal votes		2,215			1,655		
Total valid votes		200,319			200,879		
Turnout		202,534	81.3	▲4.7			
CDU hold	Majority	15,351	7.7	▲2.5			

=== 2013 election ===
Federal election (2013): Mainz
Notes:	Blue background denotes the winner of the electorate vote. Pink background denotes a candidate elected from their party list. Yellow background denotes an electorate win by a list member, or other incumbent. A ✓ or ✗ denotes status of any incumbent, win or lose respectively.						
Party	Candidate	Votes	%	±%	Party votes	%	±%
CDU	Ursula Groden-Kranich	77,285	40.1	▲3.8	74,392	38.4	▲5.7
SPD	Michael Hartmann	67,169	34.9	▲4.3	51,614	26.7	▲3.7
Greens	Tabea Rößner	19,339	10.0	▼2.6	25,339	13.1	▼2.7
FDP	Rainer Brüderle	9,633	5.0	▼6.8	12,688	6.6	▼8.9
Left	Kathrin Senger-Schäfer	8,359	4.3	▼1.4	10,652	5.5	▼1.9
AfD					8,815	4.6	
Pirates	Britta Werner	5,164	2.7		4,799	2.5	▲0.1
FW	Gerhard Wenderoth	2,609	1.4		1,422	0.7	
ÖDP	Wilhelm Schild	1,819	0.9	▼0.3	1,314	0.7	0.0
NPD					1,060	0.5	▼0.1
REP					561	0.3	▼0.9
Party of Reason	Patrick Wybranietz	830	0.4		486	0.3	
PRO					339	0.2	
BüSo	Barbara Spahn	286	0.1	0.0			
MLPD					72	0.0	0.0
Informal votes		3,583			2,523		
Total valid votes		192,493			193,553		
Turnout		196,076	76.5	▲0.6			
CDU hold	Majority	10,116	5.2	▼0.5			

=== 2009 election ===
Federal election (2009): Mainz
Notes:	Blue background denotes the winner of the electorate vote. Pink background denotes a candidate elected from their party list. Yellow background denotes an electorate win by a list member, or other incumbent. A ✓ or ✗ denotes status of any incumbent, win or lose respectively.						
Party	Candidate	Votes	%	±%	Party votes	%	±%
CDU	Ute Granold	68,081	36.3	▼2.9	61,777	32.8	▼1.2
SPD	✗ Michael Hartmann	57,338	30.6	▼10.4	43,303	23.0	▼10.4
Greens	Tabea Rößner	23,696	12.6	▲6.9	29,745	15.8	▲3.8
FDP	Rainer Brüderle	22,054	11.8	▲3.1	29,045	15.4	▲2.5
Left	Karl Voßkühler	10,737	5.7	▲2.0	13,922	7.4	▲2.8
Pirates					4,553	2.4	
REP					2,265	1.2	0.0
ÖDP	Felix Leinen	2,384	1.3		1,305	0.7	
NPD	Ingo Helge	2,043	1.1	▼0.1	1,153	0.6	▼0.2
FAMILIE					1,035	0.5	▼0.3
DIE VIOLETTEN	Erwin Schott	833	0.4				
BüSo	Christian Huth	304	0.2				
PBC					245	0.1	▼0.1
DVU					96	0.1	
MLPD					34	0.0	0.0
Informal votes		3,627			2,619		
Total valid votes		187,470			188,478		
Turnout		191,097	75.9	▼5.3			
CDU gain from SPD	Majority	10,743	5.7				

=== 2005 election ===
Federal election (2005):Mainz
Notes:	Blue background denotes the winner of the electorate vote. Pink background denotes a candidate elected from their party list. Yellow background denotes an electorate win by a list member, or other incumbent. A ✓ or ✗ denotes status of any incumbent, win or lose respectively.						
Party	Candidate	Votes	%	±%	Party votes	%	±%
SPD	✓ Michael Hartmann	79,760	40.9	▼0.2	65,285	33.4	▼4.0
CDU	Ute Granold	76,345	39.2	▲2.8	66,416	34.0	▼2.1
FDP	Rainer Brüderle	16,930	8.7	▼2.4	25,213	12.9	▲2.9
Greens	Daniel Köbler	11,235	5.8	▼2.0	23,409	12.0	▼0.4
Left	Peter Balluff	7,204	3.7	▲2.6	8,964	4.6	▲3.3
REP					2,388	1.2	▲0.1
NPD	Heinz-Jörg Zeitzmann	2,382	1.2		1,626	0.8	▲0.6
Familie					1,669	0.9	
Independent	Manfred Bartl	935	0.5				
PBC					379	0.2	▲0.1
MLPD					125	0.1	
Informal votes		3,861			3,178		
Total valid votes		194,791			195,474		
Turnout		198,652	81.2	▼1.0			
SPD hold	Majority	3,415	1.7				
