= Hôtel de Ville, Eaubonne =

Town hall in Eaubonne, France

Hôtel de Ville
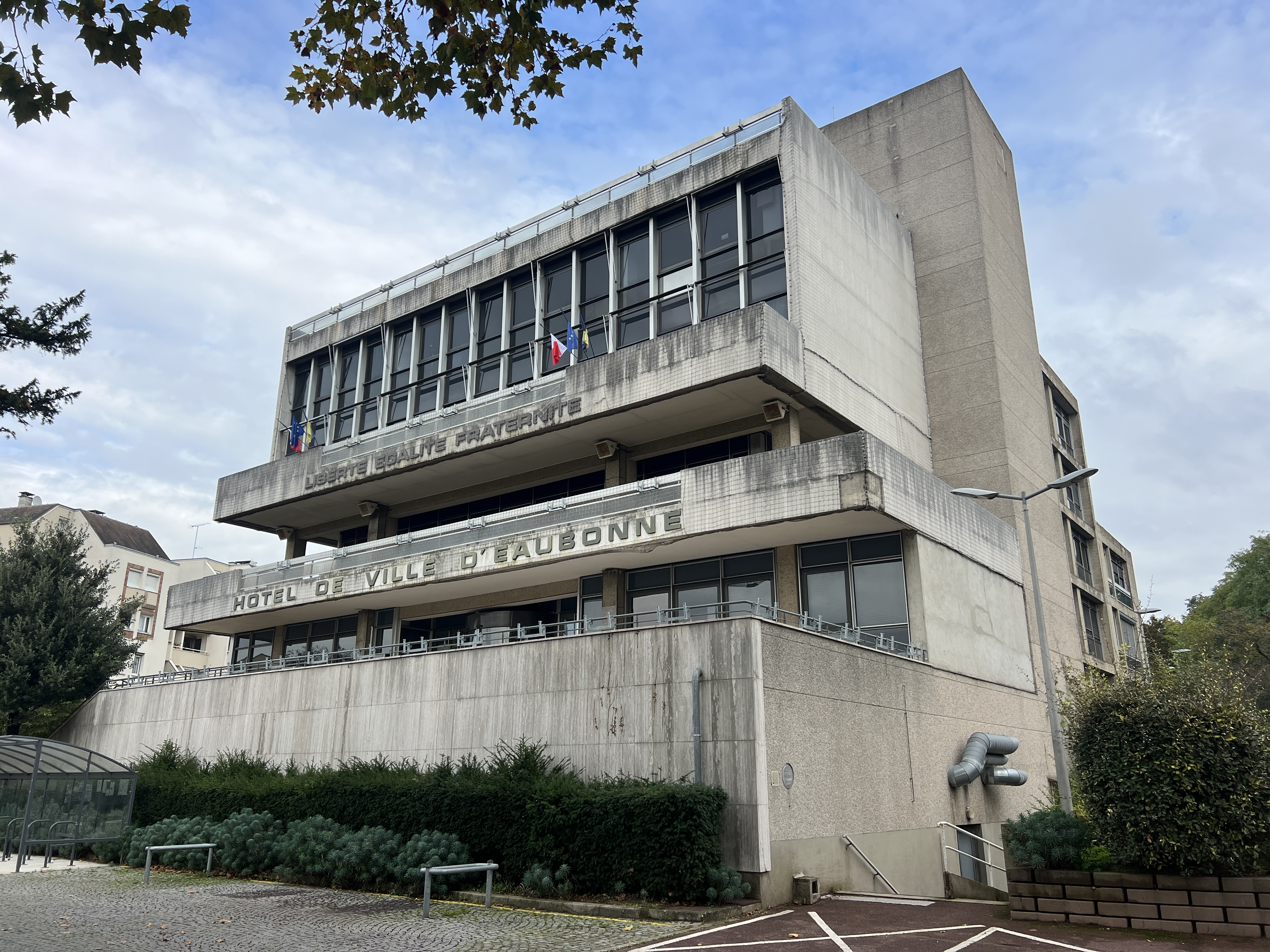
- The main frontage of the Hôtel de Ville in October 2024
- Interactive map of the Hôtel de Ville area

General information
- Type: City hall
- Architectural style: Brutalist style
- Location: Eaubonne, France
- Coordinates: 48.9907°N 2.2788°E
- Completed: 1976

The Hôtel de Ville (French pronunciation: [otɛl də vil], City Hall) is a municipal building in Eaubonne, Val-d'Oise, in the northern suburbs of Paris, standing on the corner of Rue d'Enghien and Rue Jeanne d'Arc.

== History ==
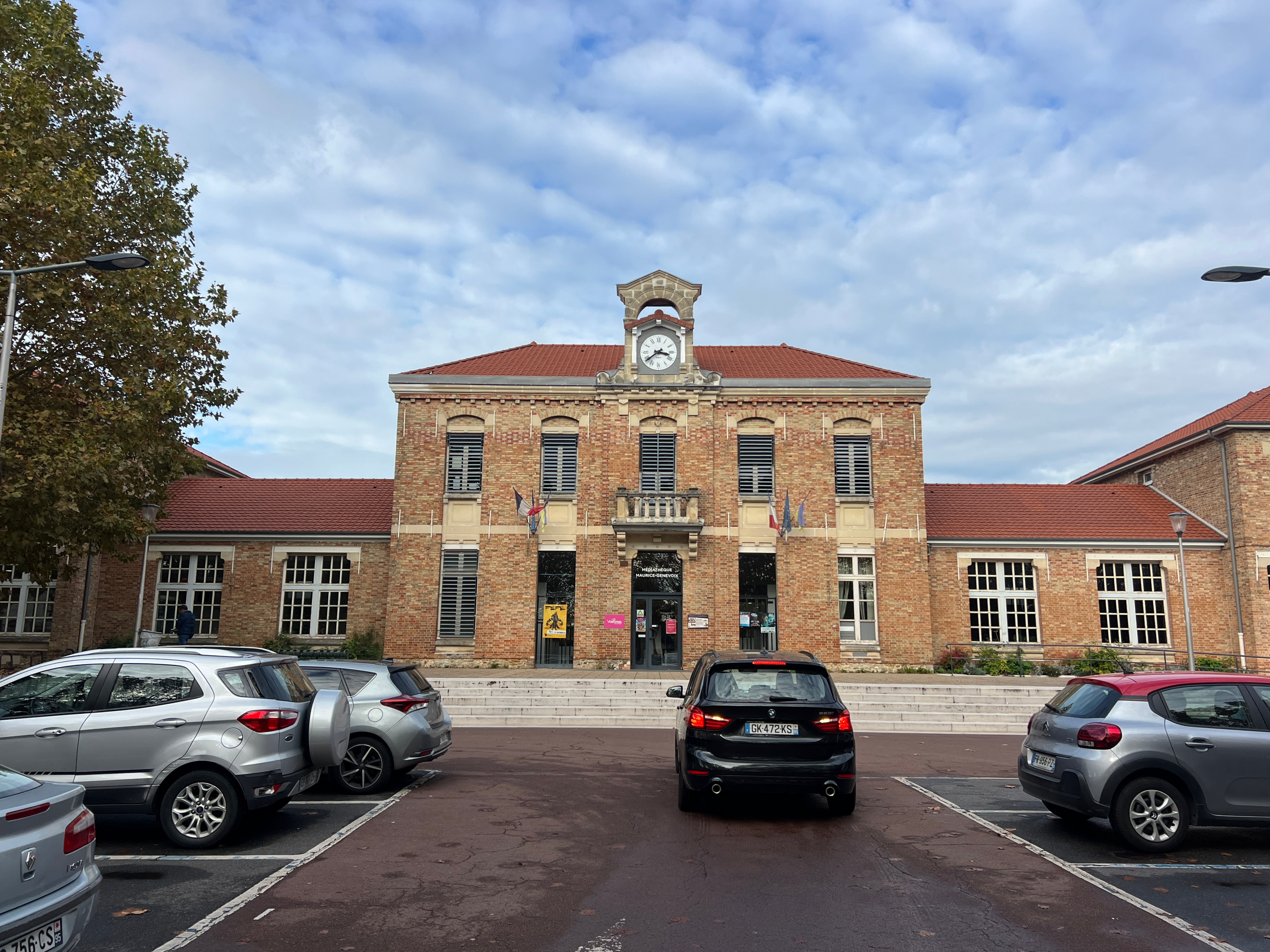
The combined town hall and school

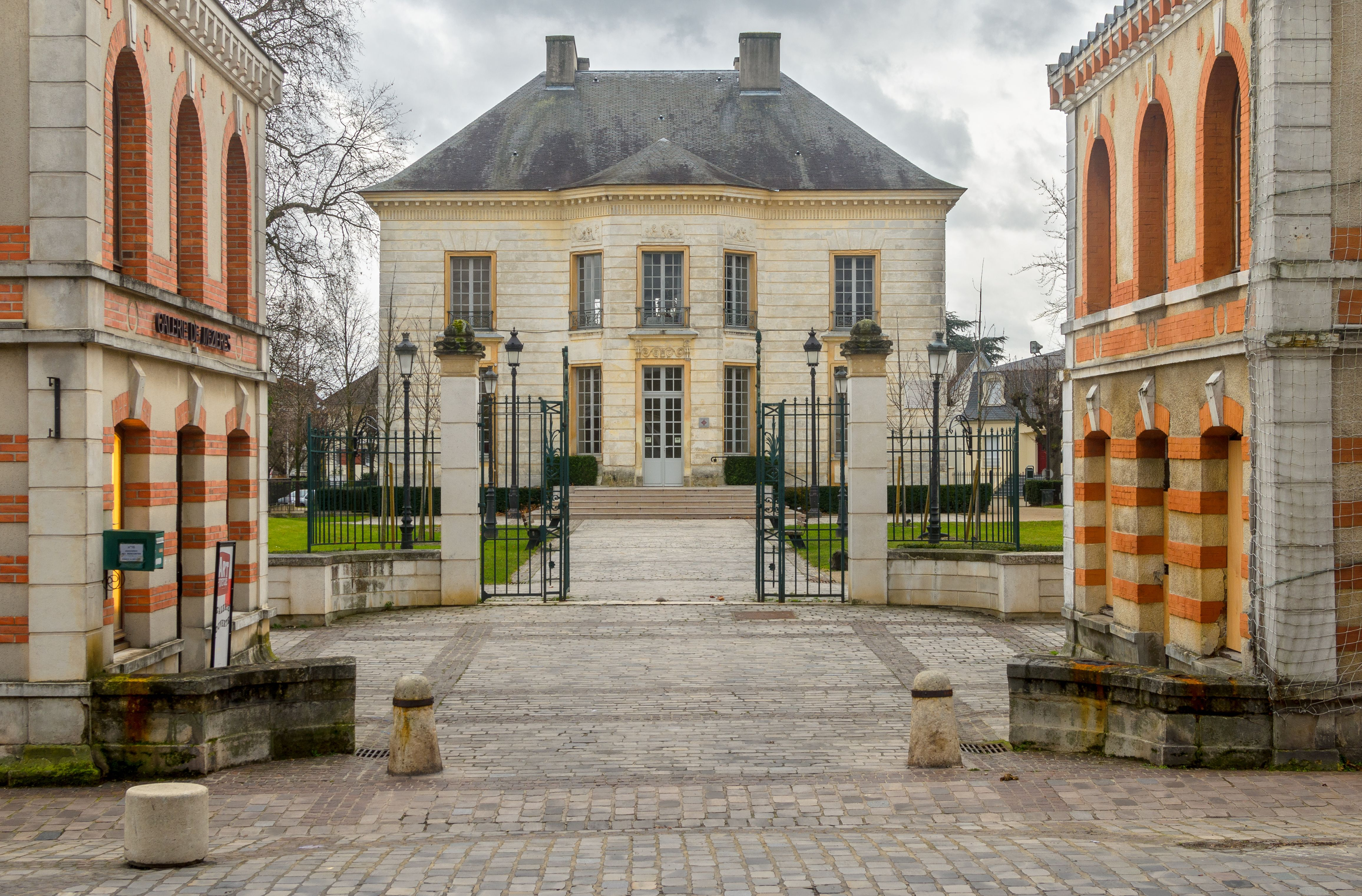
The Hôtel de Mézières

Following the French Revolution, the town council initially met in a house, which has since been demolished, on the corner of Avenue de l'Europe and Rue Cristino Garcia.

In the early 1880s, the council led by the mayor, Henry-Eugène Cocqueteaux, decided to commission a combined town hall and school. The site they selected was on the north side of Avenue de l'Europe. The new building was designed by Auguste Magne in the neoclassical style, built in brown brick and was officially opened in 1883. The design involved a symmetrical main frontage of 15 bays facing onto the street. It was laid out in three sections: a two-storey central block of five bays, a pair of single-storey connecting blocks of two bays each, and a pair of two-storey end blocks of three bays each. The central bay featured a square-headed doorway on the ground floor, a segmental headed French door with a stone balcony on the first floor and a clock above. The other bays were fenestrated by square-headed windows on the ground floor and by segmental-headed windows on the first floor. The central block contained the municipal office, while the left-hand wing accommodated the boys' school and the right-hand wing accommodated the girls' school. After the building was no longer required for municipal use, it continued to serve as a school, becoming known as the Jules Ferry Middle School, before being converted for use as the Médiathèque Maurice Genevoix in 1993.

In the early 19th century, the council led by the mayor, Charles Marret, decided to acquire a dedicated municipal building. The building it selected was the Hôtel de Mézières on the south side of Avenue de l'Europe. The building had been commissioned by the local seigneur, Joseph Florent Le Normand de Mézières et les Eaubonnais. It had been designed by Claude Nicolas Ledoux in the neoclassical style, built in ashlar stone and had been completed in 1767. The design involved a symmetrical main frontage of five bays facing onto the street. The central three bays were canted outwards and contained a doorway on the ground floor. The building was fenestrated by casement windows. It remained in the Normand de Mézières family until 1802, when it was acquired by a lawyer, Pierre Ollivier-Descloseaux.

It was then owned by a variety of people before being acquired by a banker, Charles Frédéric Georges Goguel, in 1880, by Société Bernheim in the early 19th century and by the council in January 1913. After the building was no longer required for municipal use, it was converted for commercial use and, as of 2026, accommodated the Charles Perrault International Institute on the first floor. It was also made available for visual arts exhibitions.

In the early 1970s, following significant population growth, the council led by the mayor, André Petit, decided to commission a modern town hall. The site they selected was on the corner of Rue d'Enghien and Rue Jeanne d'Arc. The new building was designed in the Brutalist style, built in concrete and glass and was completed in 1976.

The design involved a symmetrical main frontage facing onto the corner of the two streets. It featured a podium containing the Salle des Fêtes (ballroom) at basement level, a recessed glass frontage incorporating the main entrance on the ground floor with a concrete parapet above, a recessed glass frontage on the first floor with another concrete parapet above, and a glass-fronted concrete box on the second floor. A programme of works to restore the façade of the building, involving the application of a new weatherproof coating, was initiated in October 2025.
