= André Petit (politician) =

French politician (1921–2021)

Mayor of Eaubonne
- In office 1965–2001

Member of the French National Assembly
- In office 3 April 1978 – 22 May 1981
- Constituency: Val d'Oise

General Councilor of the Canton of Eaubonne
- In office 1967–1979

Personal details
- Born: 11 September 1921 Argent-sur-Sauldre, France
- Died: 20 July 2021 (aged 99) Eaubonne, France
- Party: UDF

André Petit (11 September 1921 – 20 July 2021) was a French politician.

== Biography ==
Petit served as Mayor of Eaubonne from 1965 to 2001. As Mayor, he formed a sister-city bond between Eaubonne and Budenheim in Germany. From 1967 to 1979, he served as General Councilor of the Canton of Eaubonne. A member of the Union for French Democracy, he served in the National Assembly for Val d'Oise from 1978 to 1981.

André Petit died in Eaubonne on 20 July 2021 at the age of 99.
