= Fürstenberg Castle (Rheindiebach) =

Castle in Oberdiebach, Rhineland-Palatinate, Germany

- Burg Fürstenberg
- Oberdiebach
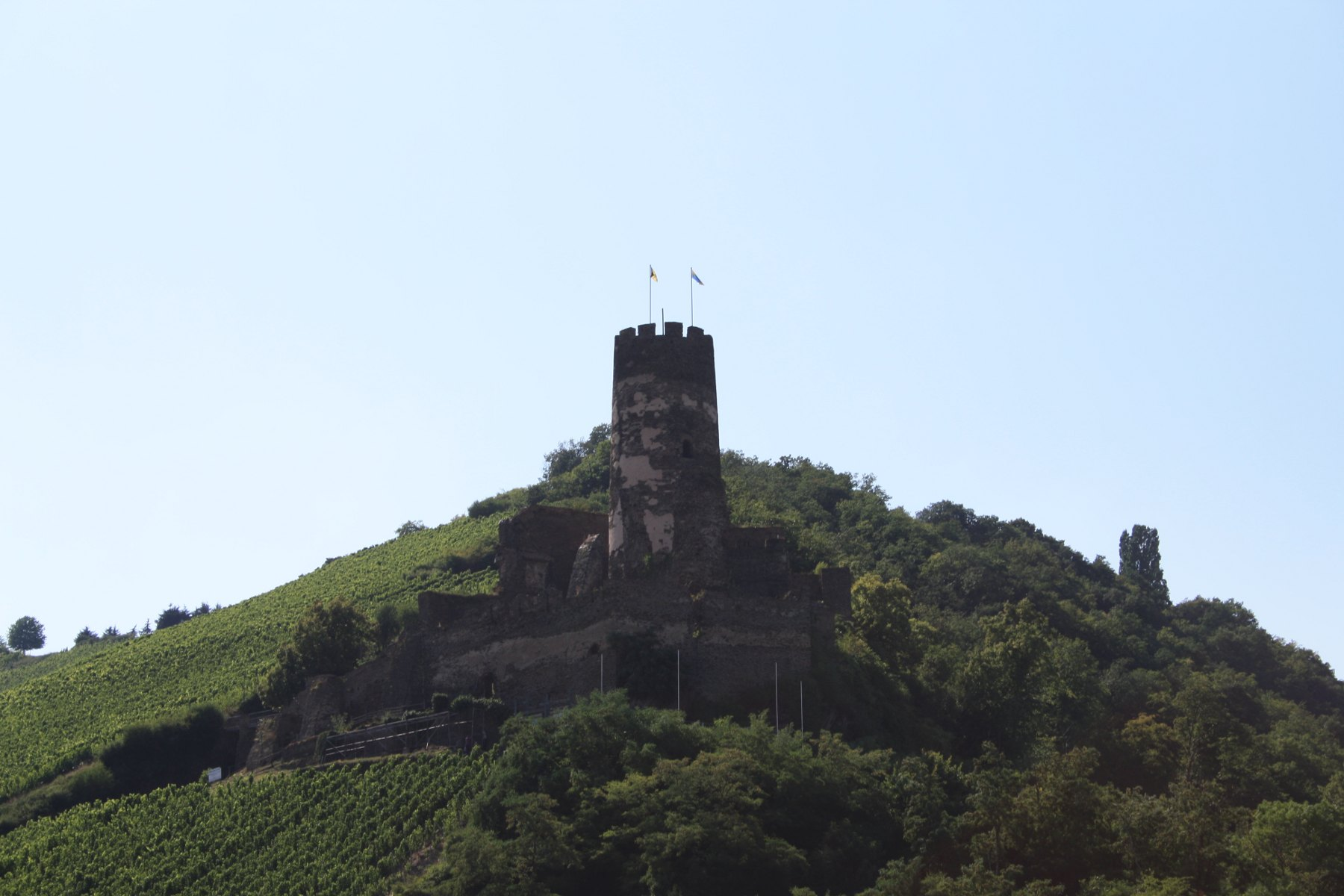

Site information
- Type: Medieval castle

Location
- Coordinates: 50°2′30.2″N 7°47′14.6″E

Site history
- Built: 1219

Fürstenberg Castle (German: Burg Fürstenberg) is a castle in the municipality of Oberdiebach in Rhineland-Palatinate, Germany.

When the castle was built in 1219, this part of the small (2,000 acres) Oberdiebach was the village of Rheindiebach.
