= Breitscheid =

Breitscheid may refer to:

- Breitscheid, Hesse, a municipality in Hesse, Germany
- Breitscheid, Mainz-Bingen, a municipality in the district Mainz-Bingen in Rhineland-Palatinate, Germany
- Breitscheid (Westerwald), a municipality in the district Neuwied in Rhineland-Palatinate, Germany
- Ratingen-Breitscheid, a borough of the city of Ratingen, Germany
- the Breitscheid meteorite of 1956, which fell in Hesse, Germany (see Meteorite falls)

== People with the surname ==
- Rudolf Breitscheid (1874–1944), German politician

== See also ==
- Breitscheidt, a municipality in the district Altenkirchen in Rhineland-Palatinate, Germany
