= Oberheimbach =

- Municipality
- Coat of arms

- Location of Oberheimbach within Mainz-Bingen district
- Interactive map of Oberheimbach
- Location within Germany Location within Rhineland-Palatinate
- Coordinates: 50°01′25″N 07°47′09″E
- Country: Germany
- State: Rhineland-Palatinate
- District: Mainz-Bingen
- Municipal assoc.: Rhein-Nahe

Government
  - Mayor (2019–24): Karl Heinz Leinberger

Area
  - Total: 8.72 km^{2} (3.37 sq mi)
- Elevation: 140 m (460 ft)

Population (2025-12-31)
  - Total: 512
  - Density: 58.7/km^{2} (152/sq mi)
- Time zone: UTC+01:00 (CET)
  - Summer (DST): UTC+02:00 (CEST)
- Postal codes: 55413
- Dialling codes: 06743
- Vehicle registration: MZ
- Website: www.oberheimbach.de

Oberheimbach is an Ortsgemeinde – a municipality belonging to a Verbandsgemeinde, a kind of collective municipality – in the Mainz-Bingen district in Rhineland-Palatinate, Germany.

The inhabitants of this small place are known colloquially as Uhlen.

== Geography ==
=== Location ===
Oberheimbach lies between Koblenz and Bad Kreuznach in the valley of the Heimbach. The winegrowing centre belongs to the Verbandsgemeinde of Rhein-Nahe, whose seat is in Bingen am Rhein, although that town is not within its bounds. Since 2003, Oberdiebach has been part of the Rhine Gorge UNESCO World Heritage Site.

== History ==
In 983, Oberheimbach had its first documentary mention.

== Politics ==
The municipal council is made up of 13 council members, counting the part-time mayor, with seats apportioned thus:

	SPD	CDU	Total
2004	7	5	12 seats

(as at municipal election held on 13 June 2004)

== Economy and infrastructure ==
=== Winegrowing ===
Biggest winegrowing centres in the growing region	Ranking among all Rhineland-Palatinate winegrowing centres by vineyard area	Vineyards under cultivation	Grape varieties
Biggest winegrowing centres in the growing region	Ranking among all Rhineland-Palatinate winegrowing centres by vineyard area	Vineyards under cultivation	White	Red
Biggest winegrowing centres in the growing region	Ranking among all Rhineland-Palatinate winegrowing centres by vineyard area	ha	%
Middle Rhine		445	85.3	14.7
Boppard	265	64	86.9	13.1
Oberheimbach	279	59	89.7	10.3

Oberheimbach is characterized by winegrowing, and with 59 ha of vineyards under cultivation, it is the biggest winegrowing centre on the Middle Rhine after Boppard (64 ha).

=== Transport ===
Bundesstraße 9, which links Mainz with Koblenz, lies northeast of the municipality, roughly 2 km away. The Rheinböllen interchange on the Autobahn A 61 lies roughly 15 km away. The nearest railway station is in Niederheimbach on the Mainz-Koblenz line.
