= Michael Hartmann (politician) =

German politician (born 1963)

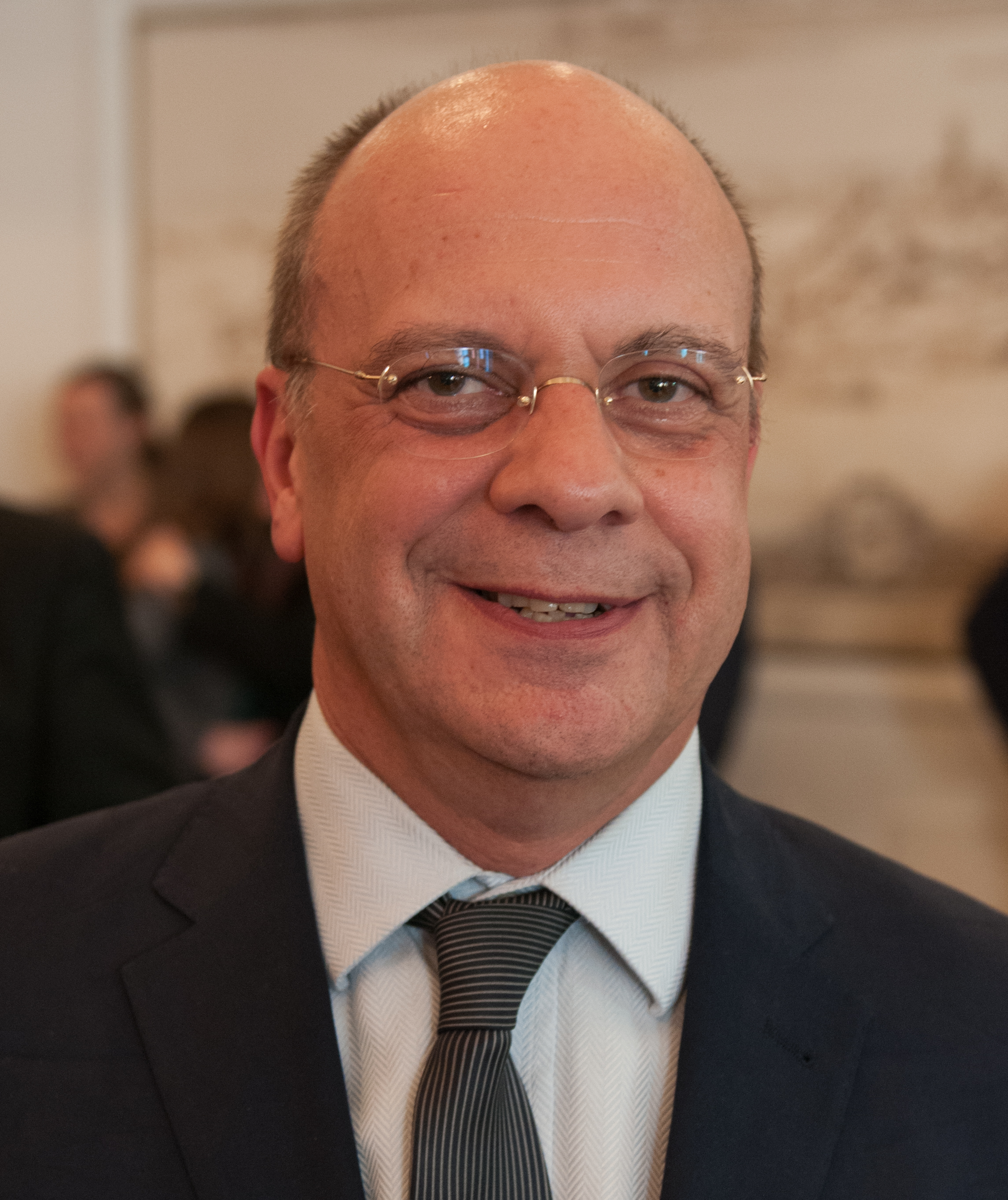

Member of the Bundestag
- In office 2002–2017

Personal details
- Born: 11 May 1963 (age 63) Pirmasens, Rhineland-Palatinate
- Party: Social Democratic Party of Germany (SPD)
- Education: University of Mainz

Michael Hartmann (born 11 May 1963 in Pirmasens) is a German politician and member of the Social Democratic Party of Germany (SPD). He was a member of the German Bundestag from 2002 to 2017. Hartmann is a specialist politician for internal security and was the domestic policy spokesman of the SPD parliamentary group as well as the chairman of his parliamentary group in the Committee on Internal Affairs and a member of the Parliamentary Oversight Panel.

== Education ==
Hartmann began studying in 1982 and graduated with a degree in political science, sociology, and German folklore at the Johannes Gutenberg University in Mainz.

== Political career ==
Hartmann joined the SPD in 1983. He first became involved with the Juso university group in Mainz and was chairman of the Wackernheim and Heidesheim am Rhein SPD local associations. From 1995 to 1999, he worked as a consultant for the support of subdivisions and commissions as well as advice on local and primary elections at the Rhineland-Palatinate state association of the SPD. He then served as press spokesman for the Rhineland-Palatinate Ministry of the Interior from 1999 to 2002 under then Minister Walter Zuber.

He was chairman of the Mainz-Bingen SPD sub-district from 1999 to 2014 and was a member of the Rhineland-Palatinate SPD state executive committee from 2004 to 2014.

From 1996 to 2005, he was chairman of the Social Democratic Community for Local Politics (SGK) in the Mainz-Bingen district.

Hartmann first entered the Bundestag as a directly elected member of parliament for the Mainz constituency in 2002. In the 2005 Bundestag election, he defended his direct mandate here with 40.9% of the first-past-the-post votes. In the 2009 federal election, Hartmann lost the direct mandate to Ute Granold of the CDU, but entered the 17th German Bundestag via the state list. In the 2013 federal election, he lost to CDU candidate Ursula Groden-Kranich in the constituency with 34.9% of the first votes, but entered the Bundestag again via the state list. He was a member of the Interior Committee from October 2002 to July 2014, where he was the chairman of his parliamentary group from 2011. From December 2009 to July 2014, he was a member of the Parliamentary Oversight Panel for the Control of intelligence agencies and from January to July 2014, he was a deputy member of the G-10 Commission, which controls the communications surveillance of intelligence services. Starting in January 2014, he was a deputy member of the Legal Affairs Committee, and since November 2014, a member of the Committee on the Affairs of the European Union. In July 2016, after a drug use controversy, Hartmann announced that he would not seek a mandate again in the 2017 Bundestag elections. From 2006 to November 2007, Hartmann was deputy chairman of the BND Investigative Committee and from November 2007 to 2009, he was the SPD parliamentary group's representative on this committee. From October 2011 to July 2014, he was domestic policy spokesman for the SPD parliamentary group.

Since 2004, he has been a member of the district council of the Mainz-Bingen district and was last re-elected in 2019.

In November 2017, Hartmann received the SPD's Willy Brandt Medal.

=== Political positions ===
During the 2013 federal election campaign, Hartmann spoke out against the legalization of soft drugs.

== Social offices ==
Hartmann is deputy chairman of the board of directors of the Magenza Foundation for Jewish Life in Mainz (German: Magenza-Stiftung für Jüdisches Leben in Mainz), a member of the board of trustees of the High Cathedral Foundation of Mainz (German: Stiftung Hoher Dom zu Mainz). He is a member of the association Rheinhessen gegen Rechts e.V..

From 2007 to 2014, Hartmann was president of the Mainz-based German Baseball and Softball Association (DBV).

== Controversies ==
=== Drug use ===
On 2 July 2014 the German Bundestag lifted Hartmann's political immunity, clearing the way for investigations into a violation of the Narcotics Law. He then resigned as the SPD parliamentary group's spokesman on domestic policy and as a member of the Parliamentary Oversight Panel. His apartment was searched on the same day but drugs were not found. Michael Hartmann admitted to the public prosecutor's office that in the fall of 2013 for about a month he had acquired and consumed crystal meth "in small quantities customary for personal consumption." At the time, he had hoped to be "more efficient" through the "drug consumption." The Berlin public prosecutor's office dropped the preliminary proceedings in September 2014 against payment of a monetary fine.

=== Edathy Affair ===
Hartmann has come under pressure again since the end of 2014 in the affair involving former SPD member of parliament Sebastian Edathy. Edathy was accused of obtaining child pornography material, and according to Edathy, it was Hartmann who informed him of the investigations against him in November 2013. Hartmann, in turn, had received this information from then-Federal Criminal Office President Jörg Ziercke. Ziercke denied having informed Hartmann directly. Hartmann stated that Edathy had revealed to him at the SPD party conference in November 2013 that he was a customer of the Canadian company in question. To substantiate his statements, Edathy disclosed text message communications with Hartmann in mid-December 2014. On 18 December 2014 Hartmann was questioned before the investigative committee investigating the Edathy Affair. The public prosecutors' offices in Berlin and Hanover initiated preliminary investigations against Hartmann in early February 2015 on suspicion of obstruction of justice in the Edathy case, whereupon Hartmann refused to make further statements to the Edathy investigative committee. An investigation on suspicion of obstruction of justice was conducted by the Lüneburg public prosecutor's office and discontinued on 6 June 2016 for lack of sufficient suspicion. A preliminary investigation conducted by the Berlin public prosecutor's office on suspicion of unsworn false testimony was also dropped for lack of sufficient suspicion, meaning that all preliminary proceedings initiated against Hartmann in connection with the Edathy affair have been dropped pursuant to Section 170 (2) of the Code of Criminal Procedure (StPO). Hartmann's legal fees were paid by the SPD parliamentary group.
