= Ursula Groden-Kranich =

German politician

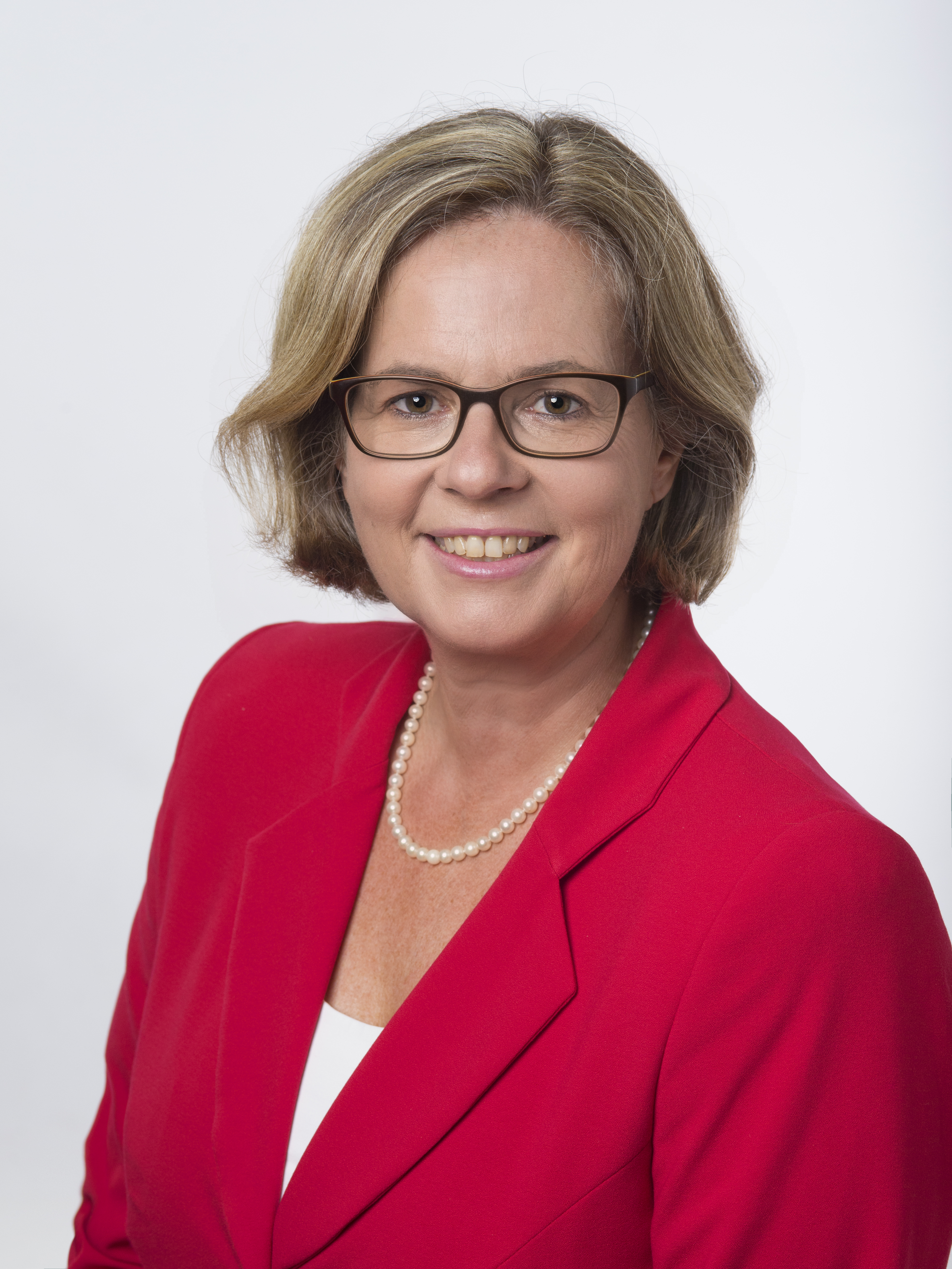
- Groden-Kranich in 2016

Member of the Bundestag for Mainz
- In office 2013–2021
- Preceded by: Ute Granold
- Succeeded by: Daniel Baldy

Personal details
- Born: 24 May 1965 (age 60) Mainz, West Germany
- Citizenship: German
- Party: CDU

Ursula Groden-Kranich (born 24 May 1965) is a German politician of the Christian Democratic Union of Germany (CDU) who served as a member of the Bundestag from 2013 to 2021, representing the constituency of Mainz. She is also a member of Mainz City Council and was the local representative for Mainz-Hechtsheim between 2004 and 2014.

== Education and career ==
After graduating from the Maria-Ward School, Mainz in 1984, Groden-Kranich continued her training at the LRP Landesbank Rhineland-Palatinate. She has continued to work for them as an investment advisor from 1989 until 2014.

Groden-Kranich is married and has a daughter. She is the honorary vice chairman of the German Red Cross (DRK) in the Mainz-Bingen district, as well as being the chairman in the local branch of Mainz-Hechtsheim. She also sits at the head of the support group for the St Pankratius Church in her locality.

== Political career ==
Groden-Kranich joined the Young Union of Germany (Junge Union), the youth branch of the CDU and CSU, in 1982 and later served on the board of the CDU in Hechtsheim. She was also a member of the federal committee of the Kommunalpolitische Vereinigung (KPV) of the party.

=== Career in local politics ===
In 1994 Groden-Kranich was elected to the local council in Hechtsheim and subsequently joined the city council in 1999. As a member of the city council she was the vice chairman of the CDU parliamentary group of the council and sat on the following committees:

- Haupt- und Personalausschuss
- Financial committee
- Subcommittee on airport expansion and protection from aircraft noise pollution
- Advisory committee on Aircraft Noise in Layenhof
- Neighbourhood committee for City of Mainz and the Mainz-Bingen region
- Layenhof association
- Governing body for the maintenance of public services in Mainz
- Governing body for the “Zentralen Beteiligungsgesellschaft Mainz“ (ZBM)
- Member of the General Assembly of the Savings Banks Association

In 2004 Groden-Kranich was elected to be the local representative for Mainz-Hechtsheim and was reelected in 2009.

=== Member of the German Bundestag, 2013–2021 ===
Groden-Kranich decided to succeed Ute Granold and stand as the CDU candidate for the Mainz constituency in the 2013 general election. She was directly elected to the Bundestag. Due to the subsequent increase in work commitments she decided to retire from her role as local representative for Hechtsheim in 2014.

In parliament, Groden-Kranich first served on the Committee on Family Affairs, Senior Citizens, Women and Youth from 2013 until 2017; during that time, she was her parliamentary group's rapporteur on European affairs, equal pay, adoption, social integration and citizenship. Also from 2013, she served on the Committee on European Affairs, where she covered relations with France, Finland, Iceland, Norway and Sweden. In 2020, she also joined the Committee on Foreign Affairs and its Subcommittee on Foreign Cultural and Educational Policy.

In addition to her committee assignments, Groden-Kranich was a member of the German-French Parliamentary Friendship Group, the German-British Parliamentary Friendship Group and the German Parliamentary Friendship Group with the Nordic States. From 2019 to 2021, she was a member of the German delegation to the Franco-German Parliamentary Assembly.

In the 2021 federal election, she lost her seat to Daniel Baldy from the SPD.

== Other activities ==
=== Corporate boards ===
- Mainzer Stadtwerke, Member of the Supervisory Board
- Wohnbau Mainz GmbH, Member of the supervisory board (-2014)

=== Non-profit organizations ===
- University of Applied Sciences Mainz, Deputy Chairwoman of the Board of Trustees
- Max Planck Institute for Polymer Research, Member of the Board of Trustees

== Political positions ==
On July 17, 2015, Groden-Kranich voted against her party's line and rejected the Merkel government’s proposal to negotiate a third bailout for Greece. In June 2017, she voted against Germany’s introduction of same-sex marriage.

Ahead of the Christian Democrats’ leadership election in 2018, Groden-Kranich publicly endorsed Annegret Kramp-Karrenbauer to succeed Angela Merkel as the party's chair. In 2019, she joined 14 members of her parliamentary group who, in an open letter, called for the party to rally around Merkel and Kramp-Karrenbauer amid criticism voiced by conservatives Friedrich Merz and Roland Koch.
