= Manubach =

- Municipality
- Coat of arms

- Location of Manubach within Mainz-Bingen district
- Interactive map of Manubach
- Location within Germany Location within Rhineland-Palatinate
- Coordinates: 50°01′59″N 7°45′32″E
- Country: Germany
- State: Rhineland-Palatinate
- District: Mainz-Bingen
- Municipal assoc.: Rhein-Nahe

Government
  - Mayor (2019–24): Hans-Günter Seckler

Area
  - Total: 7.72 km^{2} (2.98 sq mi)
- Elevation: 160 m (520 ft)

Population (2025-12-31)
  - Total: 289
  - Density: 37.4/km^{2} (97.0/sq mi)
- Time zone: UTC+01:00 (CET)
  - Summer (DST): UTC+02:00 (CEST)
- Postal codes: 55413
- Dialling codes: 06743
- Vehicle registration: MZ
- Website: www.manubach.de

Manubach is an Ortsgemeinde – a municipality belonging to a Verbandsgemeinde, a kind of collective municipality – in the Mainz-Bingen district in Rhineland-Palatinate, Germany.

== Geography ==
=== Location ===
Manubach lies on the Rhine Gorge between Koblenz and Bad Kreuznach. the winegrowing centre belongs to the Verbandsgemeinde of Rhein-Nahe, whose seat is in Bingen am Rhein, although that town is not within its bounds. Since 2003, Manubach has been part of the Rhine gorge UNESCO World Heritage Site.

== Politics ==
=== Municipal council ===
The council is made up of 8 council members, who are elected at municipal election held every 5 years.

=== Coat of arms ===
The municipality's arms might be described thus: A bend gules surmounted by three roundels argent, in chief sable issuant from the bend a lion rampant Or armed, langued and crowned of the first, in his gambes an inescutcheon of the second charged with a fleur-de-lis pierced in bend with a sword reversed azure, in base bendy lozengy sinister argent and azure.

== Culture and sightseeing ==
=== Museums ===
The W. O. von Horn Museum was opened on 12 June 2004 in memory of the clergyman and writer.

=== Regular events ===
In late August, the kermis (church consecration festival) is held.

== Economy and infrastructure ==
=== Winegrowing ===
The vineyards are confined to the south slopes and bear witness to the Middle Rhine municipality's great winegrowing tradition. Individual wineries’ histories can be traced back to the mid 18th century. In 1960, there were still 94 winegrowing operations in Manubach. Today only a few wineries and the winegrowers’ association Loreley Bacharach – as a winemaking coöperative – are still active. The new founding of a winery in 2001 newly started the old winegrowing tradition. Through the dale flows the Gailsbach, known in its upper reaches as the Gunzenbach, down to the Rhine. Over on the other side, on the north slopes, are orchards.

Along with Steeg, Bacharach and Diebach, the village belonged to the Viertälergebiet – “Four-Valley Area” – which as early as the 10th century was under the ownership of the Archbishopric of Cologne.

=== Transport ===
The Autobahn A 61 can be reached after roughly 10 km at the Rheinböllen interchange.

== Famous people ==
=== Famous people who have worked in the municipality ===
- W. O. von Horn, actually Friedrich Wilhelm Philipp Oertel, was a German writer. He lived in Manubach from 1812 to 1835 and was from 1820 to 1835 the priest there.
