= Weiler bei Bingen =

- Municipality
- Coat of arms

- Location of Weiler bei Bingen within Mainz-Bingen district
- Interactive map of Weiler bei Bingen
- Location within Germany Location within Rhineland-Palatinate
- Coordinates: 49°57′28″N 07°52′01″E
- Country: Germany
- State: Rhineland-Palatinate
- District: Mainz-Bingen
- Municipal assoc.: Rhein-Nahe

Government
  - Mayor (2019–24): Adam Josef Schmitt

Area
  - Total: 22.79 km^{2} (8.80 sq mi)
- Elevation: 250 m (820 ft)

Population (2025-12-31)
  - Total: 2,436
  - Density: 106.9/km^{2} (276.8/sq mi)
- Time zone: UTC+01:00 (CET)
  - Summer (DST): UTC+02:00 (CEST)
- Postal codes: 55413
- Dialling codes: 06721
- Vehicle registration: MZ
- Website: www.weiler-bei-bingen.de

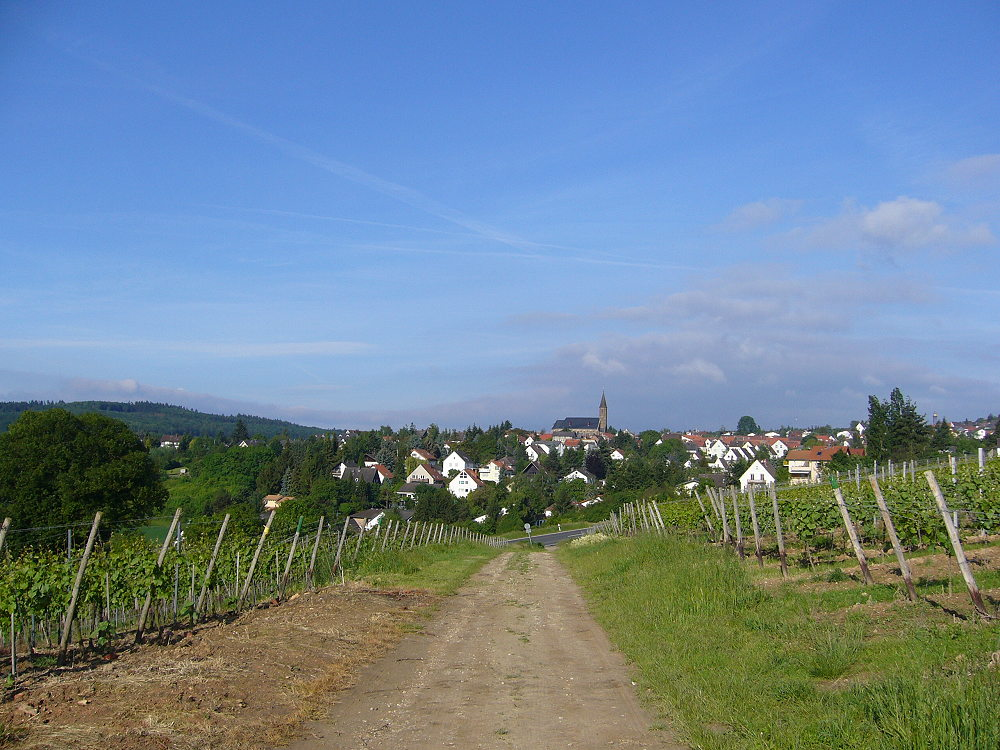
Panorama of Weiler bei Bingen

Weiler bei Bingen (German pronunciation: [ˈvaɪlɐ baɪ ˈbɪŋən], lit. 'Weiler near Bingen') is an Ortsgemeinde – a municipality belonging to a Verbandsgemeinde, a kind of collective municipality – in the Mainz-Bingen district in Rhineland-Palatinate, Germany. The winegrowing centre belongs to the Verbandsgemeinde of Rhein-Nahe, whose seat is in Bingen am Rhein, although that town is not within its bounds.

== Geography ==
=== Location ===
Weiler bei Bingen lies between Koblenz and Bad Kreuznach southeast of Bingen Forest (Binger Wald) and borders in the east on Bingen. Indeed, its name is German for “Hamlet near Bingen”.

== History ==
In 823, Weiler bei Bingen had its first documentary mention in one of Louis the Pious’s documents. However, the late Weiler citizen Heinrich Bell's collecting and researching mind is to be thanked for the knowledge that there has been human life in what is now the Weiler municipal area since the earliest times. On an ancient trail, already used by the Celts, the Romans (52 BC to AD 405) built a modern army and trade road linking Mainz with Trier and running right by Weiler (the Via Ausonia). In the part of Bingen Forest lying within Weiler's limits, the remnants of a Roman villa rustica have been being unearthed since 1994.

Weiler was always very tightly bound with Bingen even from the earliest times. The Weiler municipal area was part of the Binger Mark. The Bishops and Archbishops of Mainz held the lordship over both centres. Weiler passed to the Mainz Cathedral Chapter in 1438 and remained in its hands until French Revolutionary troops occupied the Rhine’s left bank in 1792 to 1794. The Treaty of Campo Formio ended this arrangement when in 1797 the river Nahe became the boundary between the French departments of Mont-Tonnerre (Donnersberg) and Rhin-et-Moselle (Rhein-Mosel). The Congress of Vienna eventually assigned Weiler to the Kingdom of Prussia and in 1816, Bingen passed to the Grand Duchy of Hesse-Darmstadt. Now the Nahe had become an international border. With the building of the railway lines on the Rhine and Nahe, Weiler’s outlying centre of Rupertsberg earned greater importance. In 1892, through a decree from the Kingdom of Prussia, it became self-administering under the name Bingerbrück and was split off from Weiler’s municipal area. In 1969, it was amalgamated with the town of Bingen.

Weiler’s history, however, cannot be split away from its Catholic church’s history. On the spot where once stood the little old church, which was being mentioned in documents as early as 1128, the new hall church, built in Gothic Revival style, was consecrated in 1866. It still dominates Weiler bei Bingen’s skyline today.

On 1 January 1973, the municipality’s name was changed from the former Weiler bei Bingerbrück to Weiler bei Bingen.

== Politics ==
=== Municipal council ===
The council is made up of 21 council members, counting the part-time mayor, with seats apportioned thus:

	SPD	CDU	FDP	FWG	Total
2009	6	9	1	4	20 seats
2004	5	9	1	5	20 seats

(as at municipal election held on 13 June 2004)

=== Coat of arms ===
The municipality's arms might be described thus: Per fess gules and argent, a wheel spoked of six counterchanged.

== Economy and infrastructure ==
=== Transport ===
The Autobahn A 61 can be reached through the Stromberg interchange about 7 km away, while the Autobahn A 60 can be reached over Bundesstraße 9 in Bingerbrück (going towards Mainz) after about 9 km.

=== Education ===
- Grundschule Heilig-Kreuz (primary school)
