= Daniel Baldy =

German politician

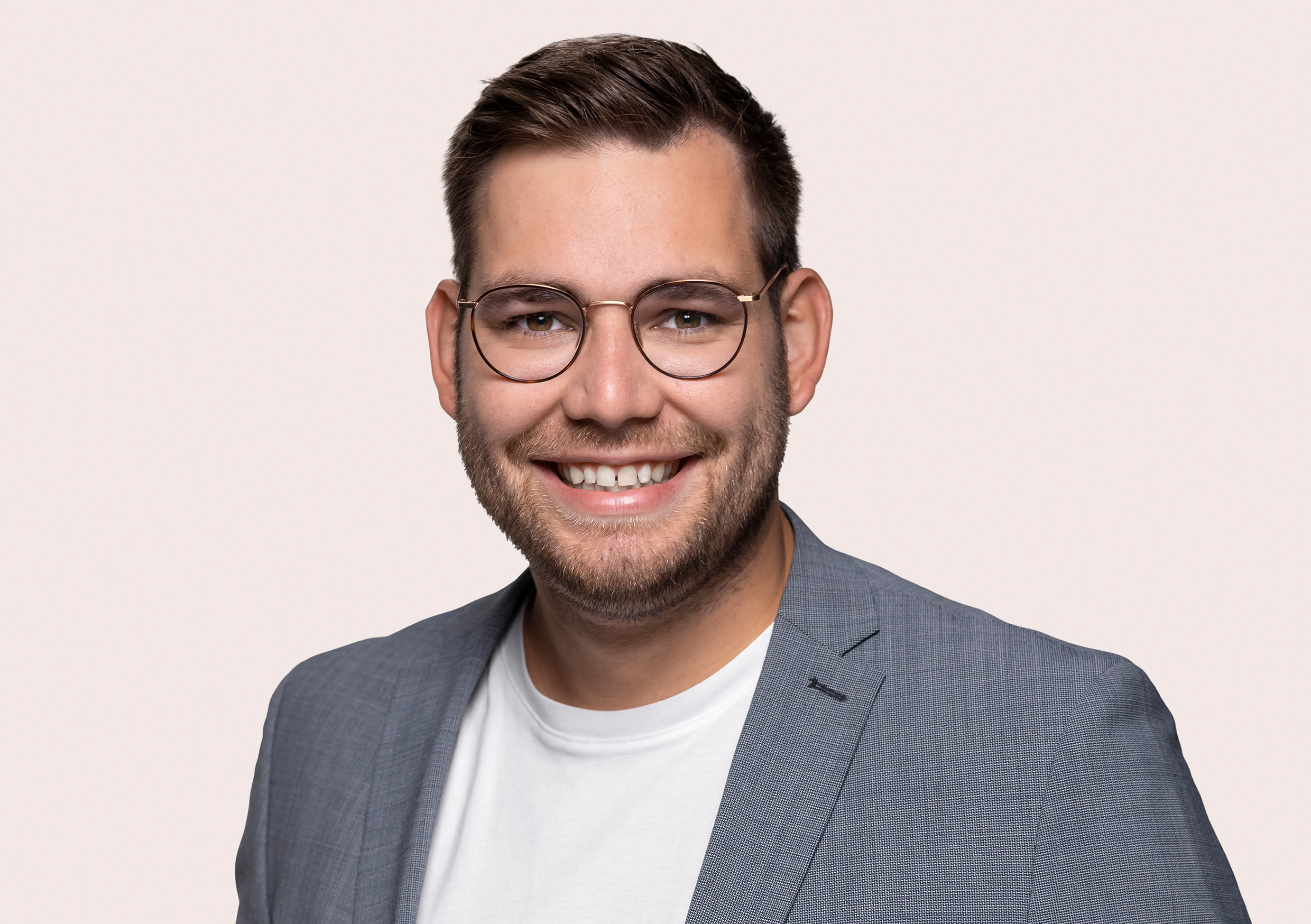
- Baldy in 2021

Member of the Bundestag
- Incumbent
- Assumed office 2021

Personal details
- Born: 25 September 1994 (age 31) Bingen am Rhein, Germany
- Party: SPD
- Education: University of Mainz

Daniel Baldy (born 25 September 1994 in Bingen am Rhein) is a German teacher and politician of the Social Democratic Party (SPD) who has been a Member of the German Bundestag for Mainz in Rhineland-Palatinate since 2021.

== Life ==
Baldy grew up in Münster-Sarmsheim in the Mainz-Bingen district, where he lived until summer 2023. He attended Stefan-George-Gymnasium in Bingen and studied history, Catholic religion and social studies to become a teacher at Johannes Gutenberg University Mainz between 2013 and 2020.In the summer of 2021, he completed his traineeship at Heinrich-Heine-Gymnasium in Kaiserslautern. He now lives in Mainz, is married and is a Roman Catholic.

== Political career ==
Baldy joined the SPD in 2011 and was chairman of Jusos Mainz-Bingen between 2014 and 2018. He was first elected to the Münster-Sarmsheim municipal council in the 2014 local elections.After the 2019 local elections, he became chairman of the SPD parliamentary group there. He was nominated as an SPD candidate for the Mainz parliamentary constituency in April 2021.

=== Member of the German Parliament, 2021–present ===
In the 2021 Bundestag election, Baldy won the direct mandate in the Mainz Bundestag constituency. With 24.9 per cent, he received the most first votes ahead of Ursula Groden-Kranich (CDU), who thus lost the constituency after two terms in office.

In parliament, Baldy has been serving on the Committee on Family Affairs, Senior Citizens, Women and Youth and the Committee on Internal Affairs and Homeland Security. Since 2025, he has been part of the Parliamentary Oversight Panel (PKGr), which provides parliamentary oversight of Germany's intelligence services BND, BfV and MAD.

== Political positions ==
Baldy cites the challenges of climate change as the most important issue for the election period and calls for a climate-friendly transport transition that 'does not leave people on low incomes behind'. He favours the federal government taking over old municipal debts as, according to Baldy, these 'jeopardise the future viability and performance of the municipalities.' In March 2022, he expressed his support for a general COVID-19 vaccination obligation, as a way out of the COVID-19 pandemic is only possible through nationwide vaccination. Baldy considers this obligation 'appropriate' in constitutional law. Baldy is a deputy member of the Committee on the Environment, Nature Conservation, Nuclear Safety and Consumer Protection and secretary. He is responsible for cyber security, political and religious extremism and preventing extremism in the parliamentary group's Home Affairs Working Group. In the area of family policy, he is particularly concerned with child and youth protection as well as protection against sexualised violence against children.

Together with his colleagues Carmen Wegge and Anna Kassautzki, Baldy drafted a position paper on better-protecting children from sexualised violence for the SPD parliamentary group in the German Bundestag in June 2023. The paper calls for a right to individual processing, stronger prevention of cyber grooming, and better awareness of the issue in schools . Baldy also favours the storage of IP addresses for better prosecution.

== Controversy ==
On May 10, 2023, Baldy attracted negative attention in the 102nd session of the German Bundestag by shouting back after the speech of the non-attached member Farle: “Dude, ey, don't get on my nerves with your bullshit! Really! Go home!” He received a call to order for this.

== Other activities ==
- Education and Science Workers' Union (GEW), Member
- IG Bergbau, Chemie, Energie, Member
- Non-partisan Europa-Union Deutschland member
- Plays in central defence for FC Bundestag

== See also ==
- List of members of the 20th Bundestag
