= Joseph Schmitt (politician) =

German politician

Member of the Bundestag
- In office 7 September 1949 – 7 September 1953

Personal details
- Born: 6 April 1882
- Died: 23 July 1967 (aged 85)
- Party: CDU

Joseph Schmitt (April 6, 1882 – July 23, 1967) was a German politician of the Christian Democratic Union (CDU) and former member of the German Bundestag.

== Life ==
He was a member of the first German Bundestag from 1949 to 1953, where he was elected to the Christian Democratic Union of Germany (CDU) as direct candidate for the Mainz constituency.

== Literature ==
Herbst, Ludolf; Jahn, Bruno (2002). Vierhaus, Rudolf (ed.). Biographisches Handbuch der Mitglieder des Deutschen Bundestages. 1949–2002 [Biographical Handbook of the Members of the German Bundestag. 1949–2002] (in German). München: De Gruyter - De Gruyter Saur. p. 1715. ISBN 978-3-11-184511-1.
