= Tabea Rößner =

German journalist and politician

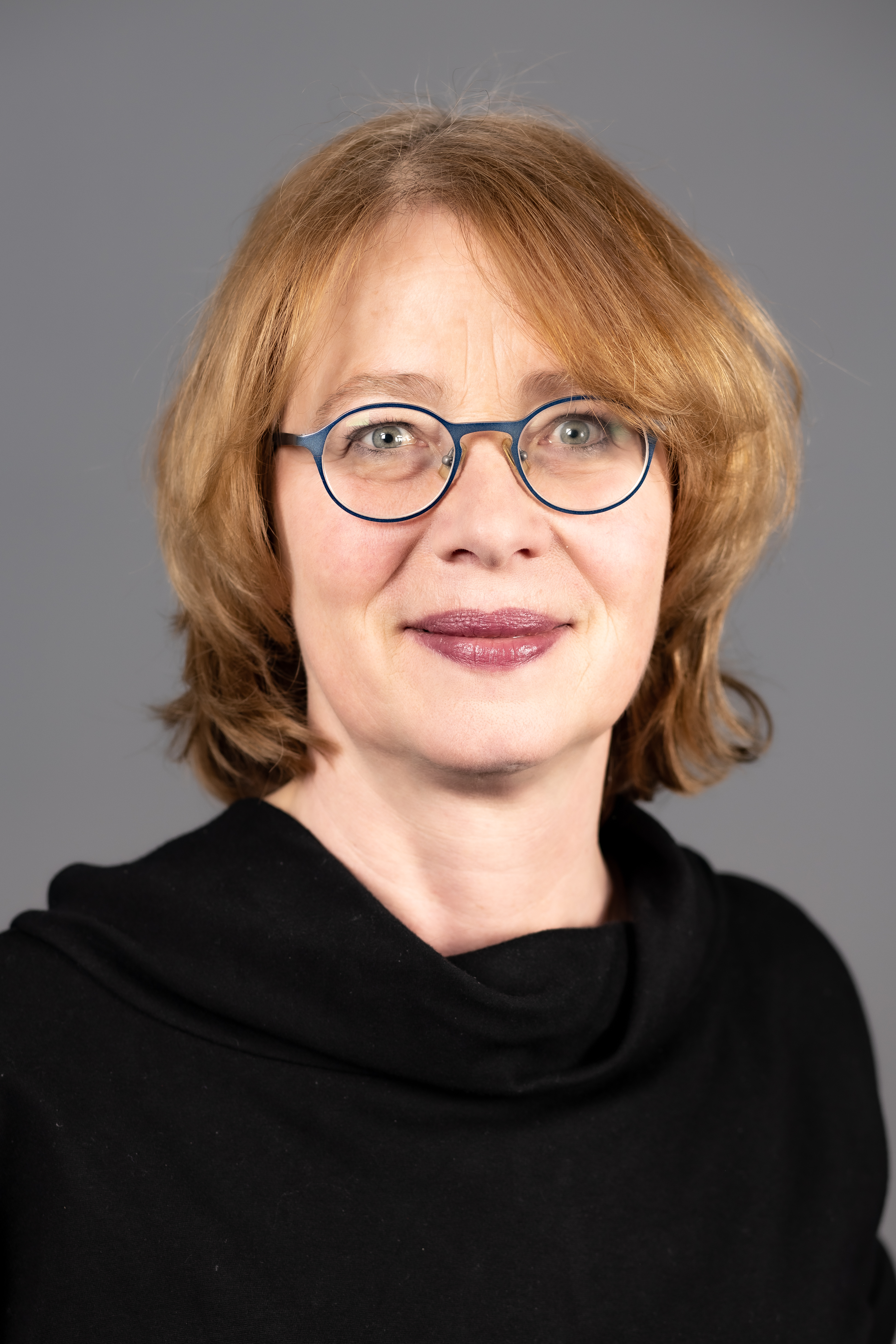
- Rößner in 2020

Member of the Bundestag
- In office 2009–2025

Personal details
- Born: 7 December 1966 (age 59) Sassenberg, West Germany (now Germany)
- Party: Greens
- Children: 2

Tabea Rößner (born 7 December 1966) is a German journalist and politician of Alliance 90/The Greens who served as a member of the Bundestag from 2009 to 2025. In 2019, she unsuccessfully ran as the Green Party's candidate for Mayor of Mainz.

== Early life and career ==
Rößner was born in Sassenberg. She became a member of the Greens in 1986 and studied musicology, art history and media studies at the University of Cologne and the Goethe University Frankfurt. During her studies, she completed an internship with New York-based composer Andrew Culver in 1989.

From 1991 until 2009, Rößner worked as a freelance journalist for Hessischer Rundfunk, RTL and ZDF.

== Political career ==
From 2001 until 2006, Rößner served as co-chair of the Green Party in Rhineland-Palatinate, alongside Manfred Seibel.

Rößner first became a member of the German Bundestag in the 2009 federal election, representing Mainz. She initially served on the Committee on Cultural Affairs and Media from 2009 until 2017 before moving to the Committee on Legal Affairs and Consumer Protection following the 2017 elections. She was her parliamentary group's rapporteur on public broadcasting. Following the 2021 elections, Rößner chaired the Committee on Digitization.

In addition to her committee assignments, Rößner was a member of the Parliamentary Friendship Group for Relations with the States of Central Asia (Kazakhstan, Kyrgyzstan, Uzbekistan, Tajikistan, Turkmenistan) and the Parliamentary Friendship Group for Relations with the States of South Asia (Afghanistan, Bangladesh, Bhutan, Maldives, Nepal, Pakistan, and Sri Lanka). She was also a substitute member of the German delegation to the Parliamentary Assembly of the Council of Europe (PACE) from 2018 to 2025, where she served on the Committee on Culture, Science, Education and Media and the Sub-Committee on Culture, Diversity and Heritage.

In the negotiations to form a so-called traffic light coalition of the Social Democratic Party (SPD), the Green Party and the Free Democratic Party (FDP) on the national level following the 2021 German elections, Rößner was part of her party's delegation in the working group on cultural affairs and media policy, co-chaired by Carsten Brosda, Claudia Roth and Otto Fricke.

In July 2024, Rößner announced that she would not stand in the 2025 federal elections but instead resign from active politics by the end of the parliamentary term.

== Other activities ==
=== Corporate boards ===
- Mainzer Stadtwerke, Member of the Supervisory Board

=== Non-profit organizations ===
- German-Israeli Health Forum for Artificial Intelligence (GIHF-AI), Member of the Board of Trustees (since 2022)
- Antenne Mainz, Member of the Broadcasting Council
- Federal Network Agency for Electricity, Gas, Telecommunications, Post and Railway (BNetzA), Member of the Advisory Board
- Haus der Geschichte, Member of the Board of Trustees (since 2009)
- German Federation for the Environment and Nature Conservation (BUND), Member
- Greenpeace, Member
- German United Services Trade Union (ver.di), Member

== Personal life ==
Rößner is married to media lawyer Karl-Eberhard Hain and has two children from a previous relationship.
