= Eaubonne =

- Commune
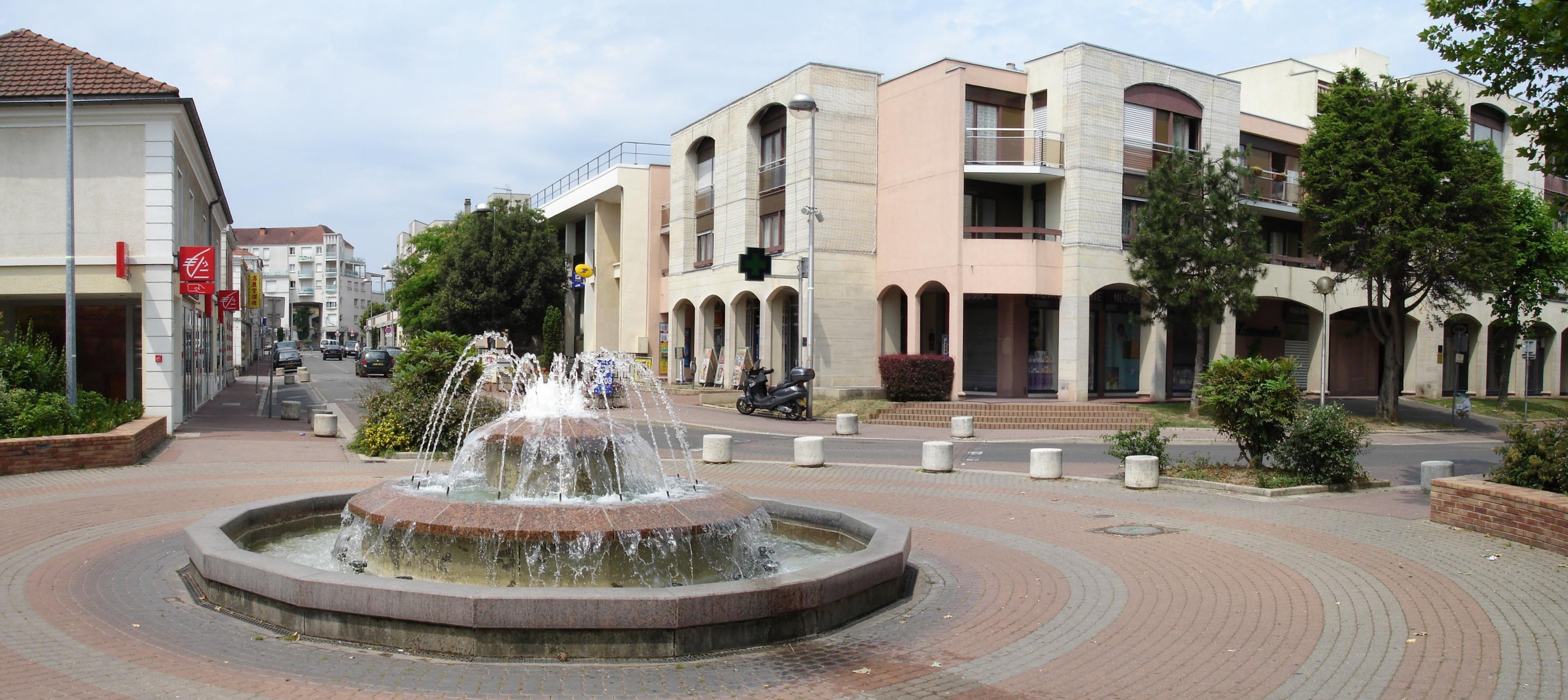
- The Avenue de l'Europe, in Eaubonne

- Coat of arms

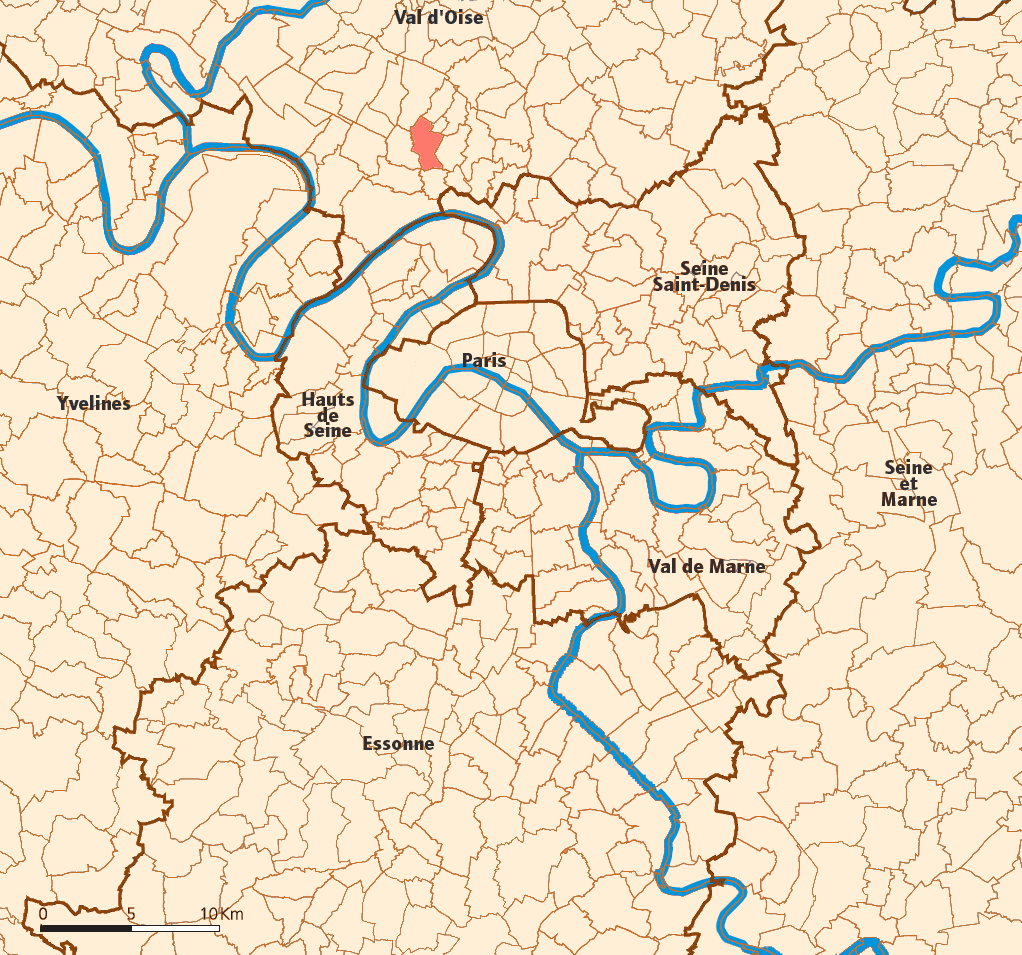
- Location (in red) within Paris inner and outer suburbs
- Location of Eaubonne
- Location within France Location within Île-de-France (region)
- Coordinates: 48°59′32″N 2°16′50″E
- Country: France
- Region: Île-de-France
- Department: Val-d'Oise
- Arrondissement: Argenteuil
- Canton: Ermont
- Intercommunality: Val Parisis

Government
  - Mayor (2020–2026): Marie-José Beaulande
- Area^{1}: 4.42 km^{2} (1.71 sq mi)
- Highest elevation: 83 m (272 ft)
- Lowest elevation: 41 m (135 ft)
- Population (2023): 26,211
  - Density: 5,930/km^{2} (15,400/sq mi)
- Time zone: UTC+01:00 (CET)
  - Summer (DST): UTC+02:00 (CEST)
- INSEE/Postal code: 95203 /95600
- ^{1} French Land Register data, which excludes lakes, ponds, glaciers > 1 km^{2} (0.386 sq mi or 247 acres) and river estuaries.

Eaubonne (French pronunciation: [obɔn]) is a commune in the Val-d'Oise department, in the northern outer suburbs of Paris, France. It is located 16.1 km (10.0 mi) from the centre of Paris.

== Toponymy ==
The name Eaubonne is derived from the Latin aqua bona, meaning 'good water'.

== History ==
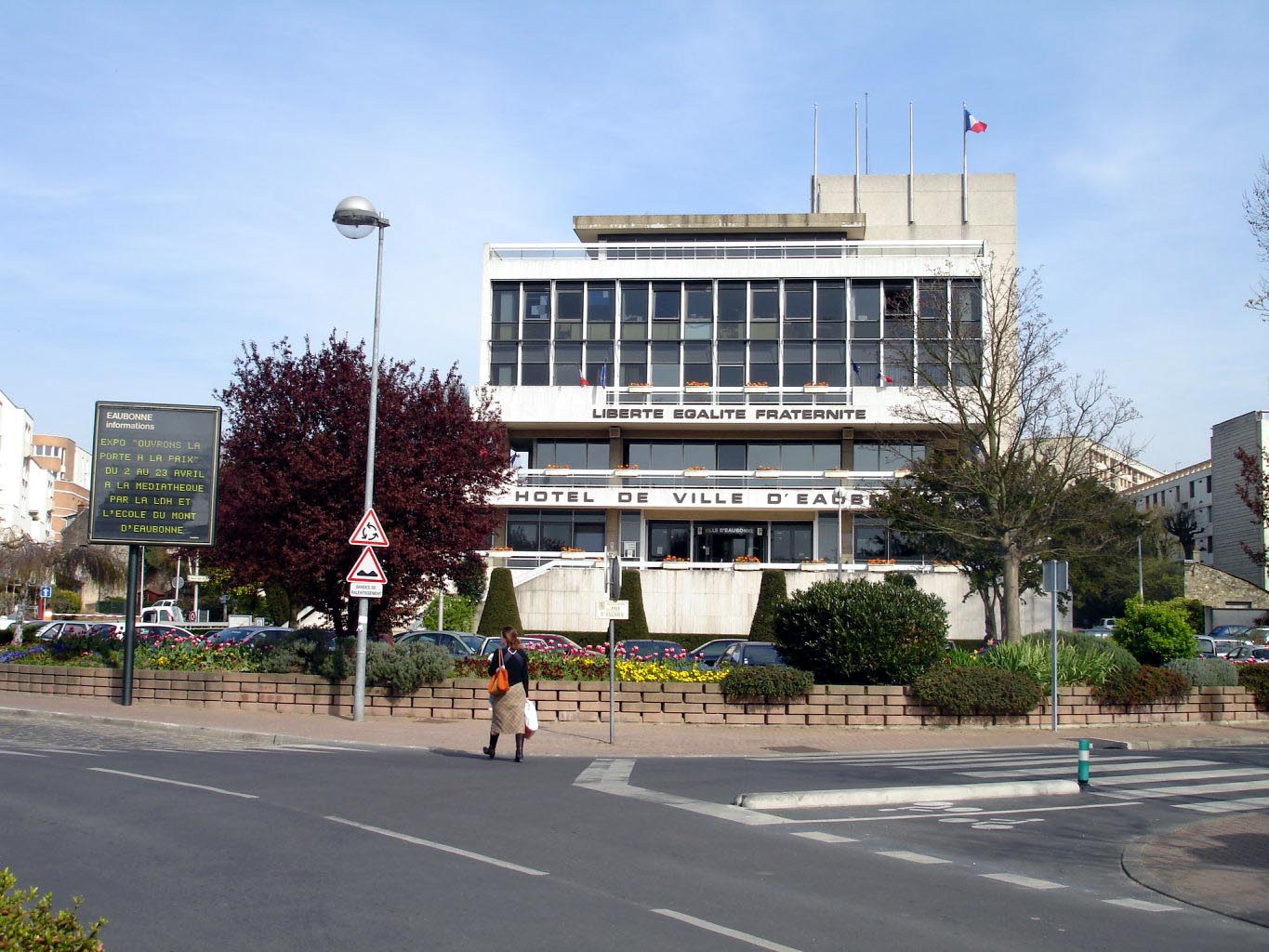
The Hôtel de Ville

The Hôtel de Ville was completed in 1976.

== Population ==
Historical population

Year	Pop.	±% p.a.
1793	228	—
1821	221	−0.11%
1846	201	−0.38%
1861	402	+4.73%
1872	530	+2.54%
1876	736	+8.56%
1881	839	+2.65%
1886	1,130	+6.14%
1891	1,086	−0.79%
1896	1,394	+5.12%
1901	1,889	+6.27%
1906	2,506	+5.82%
1911	3,263	+5.42%
1921	4,191	+2.53%
1926	6,151	+7.98%

Year	Pop.	±% p.a.
1931	7,839	+4.97%
1936	8,797	+2.33%
1946	9,627	+0.91%
1954	11,312	+2.04%
1962	14,607	+3.25%
1968	22,278	+7.29%
1975	23,668	+0.87%
1982	22,227	−0.89%
1990	22,153	−0.04%
1999	22,882	+0.36%
2007	23,541	+0.36%
2012	24,714	+0.98%
2017	25,097	+0.31%
2023	26,211	+0.73%

Source: EHESS and INSEE (1968-2023)

== Twin towns ==
It is twinned with Matlock, Derbyshire, England; Budenheim, Germany and Vălenii de Munte, Romania.

== Transport ==
Eaubonne is served by Ermont–Eaubonne station which is an interchange station on Paris RER line C, on the Transilien Paris-Nord suburban rail line, and on the Transilien Paris-Saint-Lazare suburban rail line. This station is located at the border between the commune of Eaubonne and the commune of Ermont, on the Ermont side of the border.

Eaubonne is also served by Champ de courses d'Enghien station on the Transilien Paris – Nord suburban rail line. This station is located at the border between the commune of Eaubonne and the commune of Soisy-sous-Montmorency, on the Soisy-sous-Montmorency side of the border.

== See also ==
- Communes of the Val-d'Oise department
