= Rhein-Nahe =

Verbandsgemeinde in Rhineland-Palatinate

- Verbandsgemeinde
- Coat of arms

- Location of Rhein-Nahe within Mainz-Bingen district
- Interactive map of Rhein-Nahe
- Location within Germany Location within Rhineland-Palatinate
- Coordinates: 50°01′N 7°47′E
- Country: Germany
- State: Rhineland-Palatinate
- District: Mainz-Bingen
- Seat: Bingen am Rhein
- Subdivisions: 10 municipalities

Area
  - Total: 114.78 km^{2} (44.32 sq mi)

Population (2025-12-31)
  - Total: 14,485
  - Density: 126.20/km^{2} (326.85/sq mi)
- Time zone: UTC+01:00 (CET)
  - Summer (DST): UTC+02:00 (CEST)
- Website: www.vgrn.de

Rhein-Nahe is a Verbandsgemeinde ("collective municipality") in the district Mainz-Bingen, in Rhineland-Palatinate, Germany. It is situated along the left bank of the Rhine, north of Bingen. Bingen is the seat of the municipality, but not part of it.

The Verbandsgemeinde Rhein-Nahe consists of the following Ortsgemeinden ("local municipalities"):

- Bacharach
- Breitscheid
- Manubach
- Münster-Sarmsheim
- Niederheimbach
- Oberdiebach
- Oberheimbach
- Trechtingshausen
- Waldalgesheim
- Weiler bei Bingen
