= Oberdiebach =

- Municipality
- Coat of arms

- Location of Oberdiebach within Mainz-Bingen district
- Interactive map of Oberdiebach
- Location within Germany Location within Rhineland-Palatinate
- Coordinates: 50°02′03″N 7°46′43″E
- Country: Germany
- State: Rhineland-Palatinate
- District: Mainz-Bingen
- Municipal assoc.: Rhein-Nahe
- Subdivisions: 3

Government
  - Mayor (2019–24): Bernhard Laudert

Area
  - Total: 8.38 km^{2} (3.24 sq mi)
- Elevation: 90 m (300 ft)

Population (2025-12-31)
  - Total: 851
  - Density: 102/km^{2} (263/sq mi)
- Time zone: UTC+01:00 (CET)
  - Summer (DST): UTC+02:00 (CEST)
- Postal codes: 55413
- Dialling codes: 06743
- Vehicle registration: MZ
- Website: www.oberdiebach.de

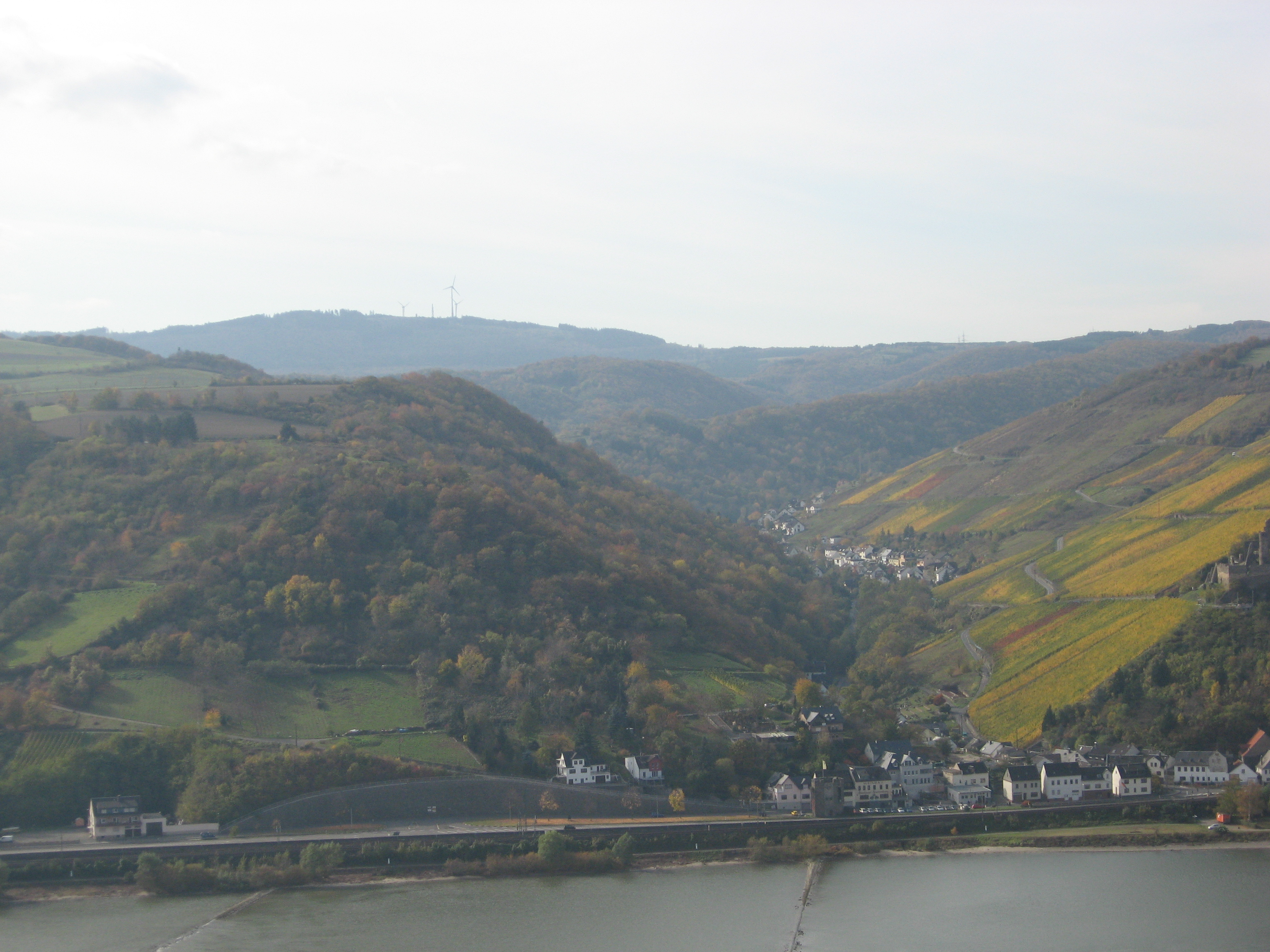
Oberdiebach, Ortsteil Rheindiebach

Oberdiebach is an Ortsgemeinde – a municipality belonging to a Verbandsgemeinde, a kind of collective municipality – in the Mainz-Bingen district in Rhineland-Palatinate, Germany.

== Geography ==
=== Location ===
Oberdiebach lies between Koblenz and Bad Kreuznach. The winegrowing centre belongs to the Verbandsgemeinde of Rhein-Nahe, whose seat is in Bingen am Rhein, although that town is not within its bounds. Since 2003, Oberdiebach has been part of the Rhine Gorge UNESCO World Heritage Site.

=== Constituent communities ===
Oberdiebach's Ortsteile are Oberdiebach, Rheindiebach and Winzberg.

== History ==
In 893, Oberdiebach had its first documentary mention. In 1220, Fürstenberg Castle (Burg Fürstenberg) was built by the Elector of Cologne on the border with Electoral Mainz. In 1461, Rheindiebach (Dyepach Ryne) had its first documentary mention. In 1689, the French destroyed Fürstenberg Castle. In 1822, the men's singing club MGV “Eintracht” was founded and is today one of Rhineland-Palatinate's oldest singing clubs.

== Politics ==
=== Municipal council ===
The council is made up of 13 council members, counting the part-time mayor, with seats apportioned thus:

	Liste Krämer	Liste Stüber	CDU	Total
2004	7	2	3	12 seats

(as at municipal election held on 13 June 2004)

== Culture and sightseeing ==
=== Buildings ===
In the constituent community of Oberdiebach stands Saint Maurice's Parish Church (Pfarrkirche St. Mauritius, 1414) with an altarpiece and an iron pulpit. In the constituent community of Rheindiebach stand the ruins of Fürstenberg Castle and the “Half Tower” (halber Turm), formerly part of the Gothic fortifications. Great parts of the fortifications had to give way in the latter half of the 20th century to expansions to Bundesstraße 9.

== Economy and infrastructure ==
Oberdiebach's economy is based on winegrowing. Tourism only plays s small part.

=== Transport ===
Running right through the municipality is Bundesstraße 9, which links Mainz with Koblenz. The Rheinböllen interchange on the Autobahn A 61 lies roughly 11 km away. The nearest railway station is in Niederheimbach on the Mainz-Koblenz line.
