= Breitscheid, Mainz-Bingen =

Breitscheid
- Municipality
- Coat of arms

- Location of Breitscheid within Mainz-Bingen district
- Interactive map of Breitscheid
- Location within Germany Location within Rhineland-Palatinate
- Coordinates: 50°03′25″N 7°42′29″E
- Country: Germany
- State: Rhineland-Palatinate
- District: Mainz-Bingen
- Municipal assoc.: Rhein-Nahe

Government
  - Mayor (2019–24): Marcel Rüdesheim

Area
  - Total: 5.31 km^{2} (2.05 sq mi)
- Elevation: 360 m (1,180 ft)

Population (2025-12-31)
  - Total: 151
  - Density: 28.4/km^{2} (73.7/sq mi)
- Time zone: UTC+01:00 (CET)
  - Summer (DST): UTC+02:00 (CEST)
- Postal codes: 55422
- Dialling codes: 06743
- Vehicle registration: MZ

Breitscheid (German pronunciation: [ˈbʁaɪtˌʃaɪt]) is an Ortsgemeinde – a municipality belonging to a Verbandsgemeinde, a kind of collective municipality – in the Mainz-Bingen district in Rhineland-Palatinate, Germany.

== Geography ==
=== Location ===
Breitscheid lies in the Hunsrück between Koblenz and Bad Kreuznach. It belongs to the Verbandsgemeinde of Rhein-Nahe, whose seat is in Bingen am Rhein, although that town is not within its bounds. The placename comes from the Middle High German breit and -scheid: “wooded ridge”.

== Politics ==
=== Municipal council ===
The council is made up of five council members who were elected by majority vote in a municipal election held on 2 March 2008.

=== Coat of arms ===
The municipality's arms might be described thus: Per pale argent a cross sable and gules in chief sinister a mullet of six, and in base a mound royal ensigned with a cross crosslet Or.

== Economy and infrastructure ==
=== Transport ===
Autobahn A 61 can be reached after a drive of roughly 10 km.
