= Budenheim =

- Municipality
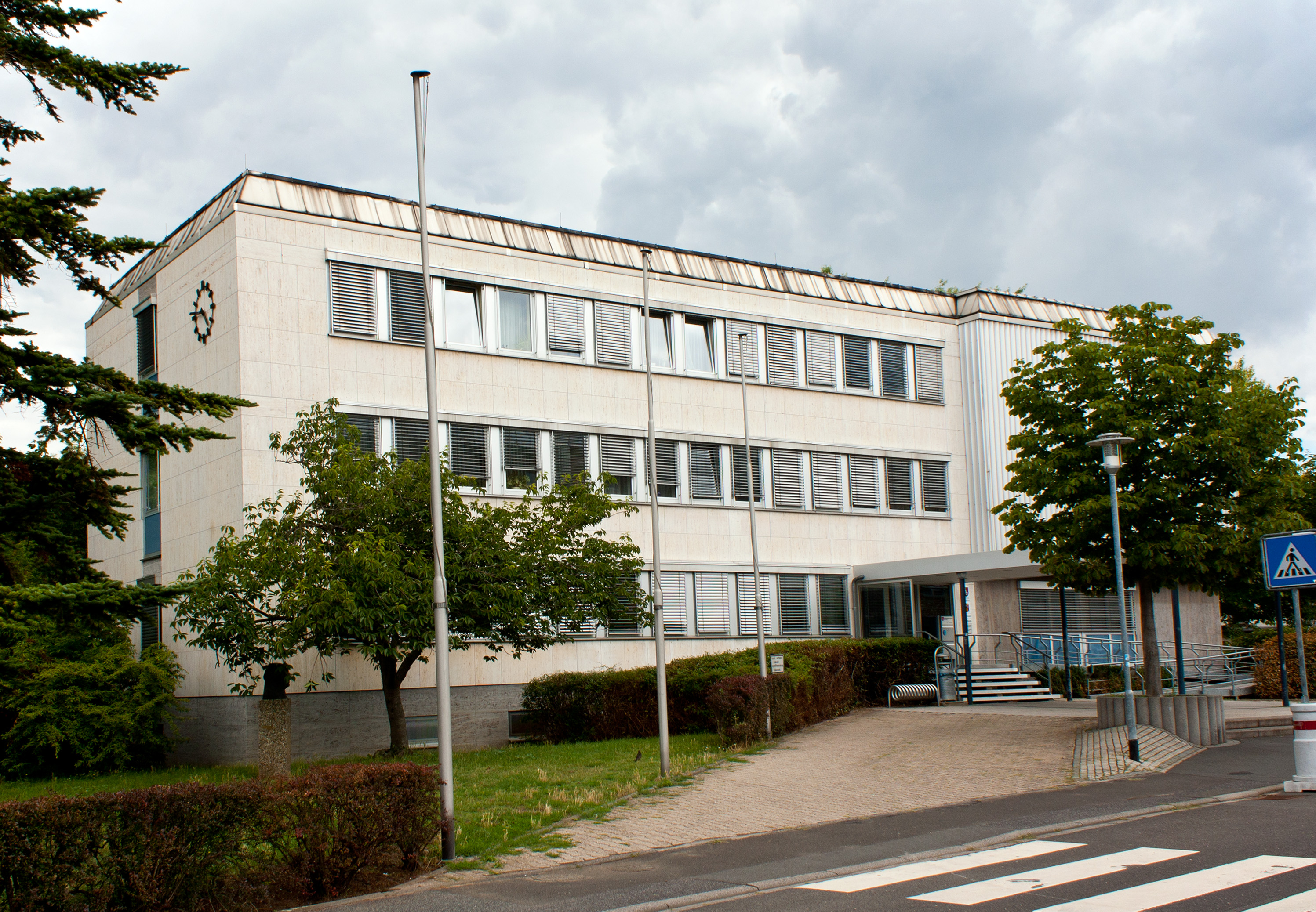
- Town hall

- Coat of arms

- Location of Budenheim within Mainz-Bingen district
- Interactive map of Budenheim
- Location within Germany Location within Rhineland-Palatinate
- Coordinates: 50°01′N 08°10′E
- Country: Germany
- State: Rhineland-Palatinate
- District: Mainz-Bingen

Government
  - Mayor (2026–34): Stephan Hinz (CDU)

Area
  - Total: 10.61 km^{2} (4.10 sq mi)
- Elevation: 90 m (300 ft)

Population (2025-12-31)
  - Total: 8,077
  - Density: 761.3/km^{2} (1,972/sq mi)
- Time zone: UTC+01:00 (CET)
  - Summer (DST): UTC+02:00 (CEST)
- Postal codes: 55257
- Dialling codes: 06139
- Vehicle registration: MZ, BIN
- Website: www.budenheim.de

Budenheim (German pronunciation: [ˈbuːdn̩haɪm]) is a municipality in the Mainz-Bingen district in Rhineland-Palatinate, Germany. Unlike other municipalities in Mainz-Bingen, it does not belong to any association of municipalities.

== Geography ==
=== Location ===
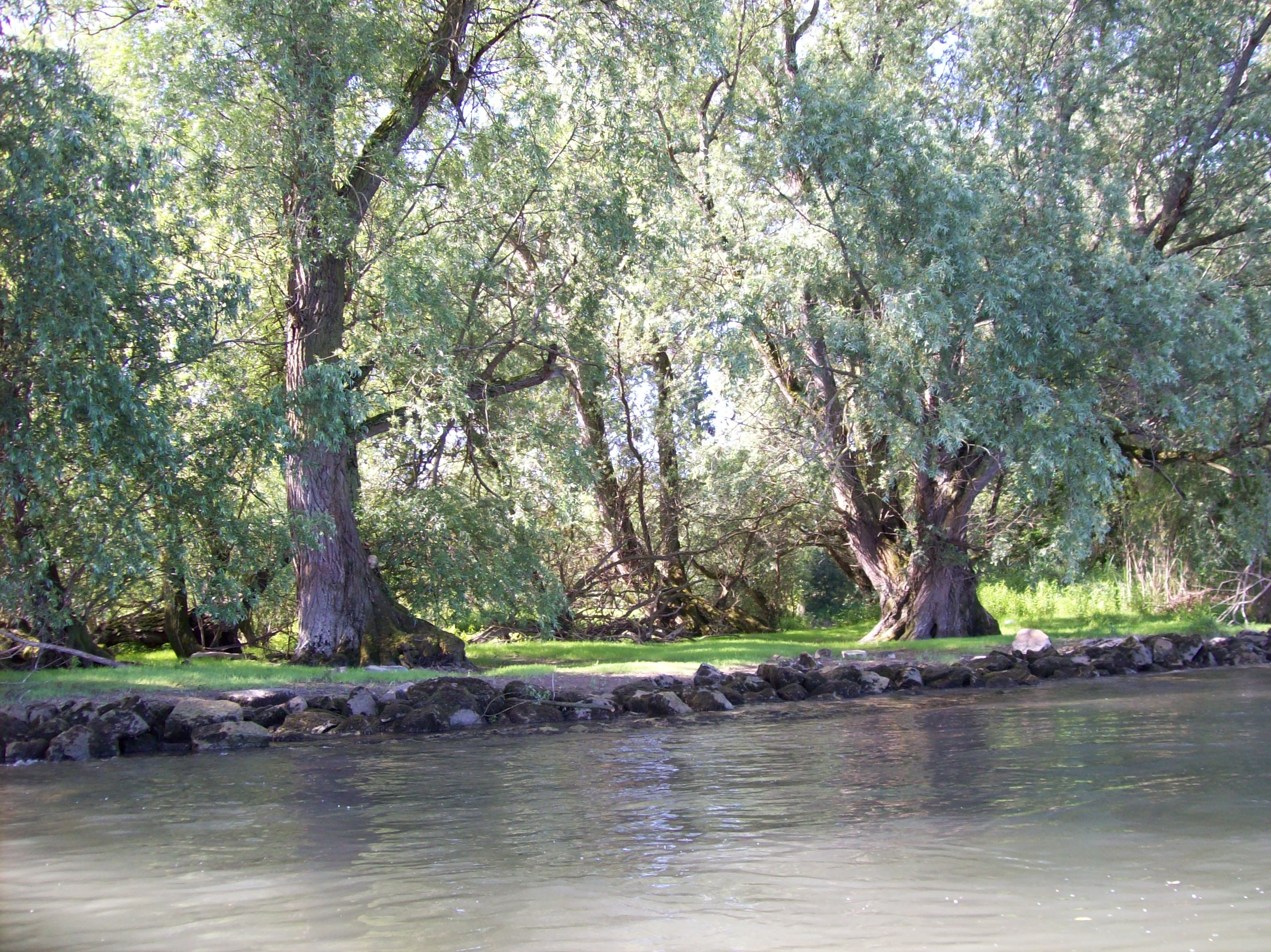
Floodplain forest near Budenheim (conservation area)

The Municipality of Budenheim is the only Verbandsgemeinde-free municipality in Mainz-Bingen. The municipality lies in Rhenish Hesse, 9 km west of Rhineland-Palatinate's capital Mainz, and is bordered by the north-flowing Rhine and the Lennebergwald (forest) on the residential community's south and west.

=== Greatest elevation ===
Budenheim's greatest elevation is the Lenneberg at 176.8 m, which is in the Lennebergwald. At this spot stands the Lennebergturm (tower), dedicated in 1880 and belonging to the Wander- und Lennebergverein Rheingold Mainz e. V. (a hiking club).

== History ==
Budenheim had its first documentary mention – albeit undated – as Butenheim in the Lorsch codex in a listing of the Lorsch Abbey’s holdings in and around Mainz (Urkunde-Nr. 1977); this was the municipality’s only mention therein.

== Politics ==
=== Communal council and mayor ===
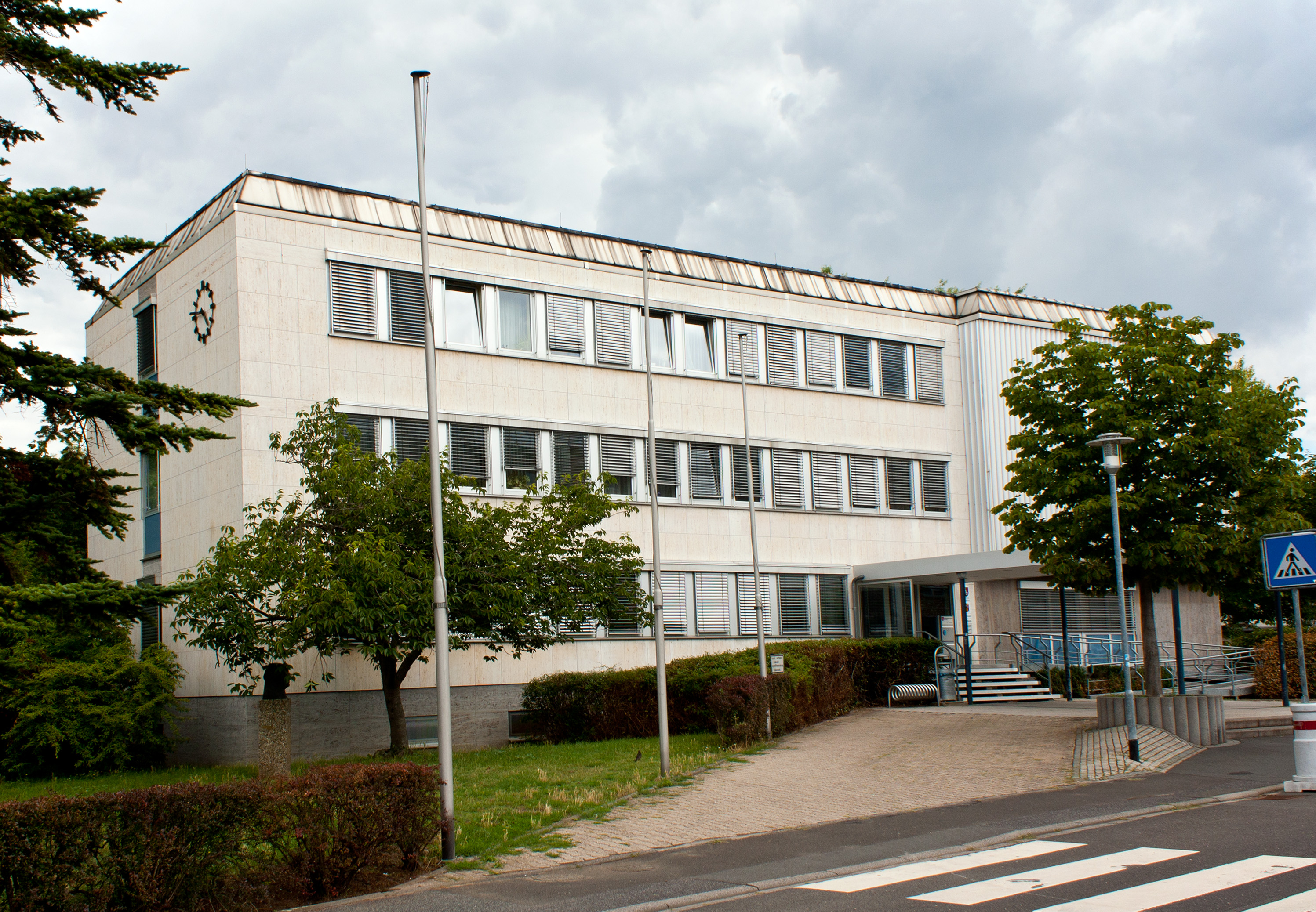
Budenheim town hall

The communal council is made up of 24 volunteer council members (elected in the communal elections on June 9, 2024) and full-time mayor Stephan Hinz (CDU) who took office after his predecessor Rainer Becker (CDU) stepped down prematurely in 2018 - having held office since 1998.

Current and past seat distributions:

	SPD	CDU	The Greens	FDP	FW	GLB	Total
2024	5	7	6	1	5	-	24 seats
2019	5	10	7	2	-	-	24 seats
2014	6	12	4	2	-	-	24 seats
2009	6	12	-	2	-	4
2004	6	13	-	2	-	3

- GLB = voting bloc „Grüne Liste Budenheim“, since June 2012 a branch of Bündnis 90/The Greens.

Communal partnership programs

Budenheim has communal partnerships with Eaubonne in France and Isola-della-Scala in Italy. It also maintains friendly relations with the town of Wiesmoor in Lower Saxony.

=== Town partnerships ===
- Eaubonne, Val-d'Oise, France
- Isola della Scala, Province of Verona, Veneto, Italy
- (Germany) Wiesmoor, Aurich district, Lower Saxony

The third place listed here is a town in East Frisia with which Budenheim fosters “friendly relations”.

=== Coat of arms ===
The municipality's arms might be described thus: Gules on a base sable Saint Pancras in armour with a sword on his belt all argent, in his hand dexter a flagpole argent bendwise flying from which the banner of Saint Pancras, argent a cross gules, standing on his foot sinister a shield argent charged with a cross gules.

Heraldry of the World shows a different coat of arms for Budenheim, with the same charges but in different tinctures. The shield at Saint Pancras's foot, for instance, is Or (gold), including the cross with which it is charged, and the cross on Saint Pancras's banner is sable (black) instead of gules (red). Heraldry of the World also shows a proposed coat of arms for Budenheim put forth in 1956, which apparently failed to win any great support. It is charged with Saint Pancras's banner only on an azure (blue) field and with a golden flagpole.

Saint Pancras is Budenheim's patron saint, which explains why he was chosen as a charge for the municipality's arms. The arms are based on a 16th-century village seal, and the tinctures are those from the arms borne by Electoral Mainz. These were chosen as no traditional tinctures were known.

== Palaeontological finds ==
=== The Budenheim Rhinoceros ===
In 1911, the most important and finest specimen of a rhinoceros, some 20 million years old from the Miocene, was unearthed in Budenheim. The fossil is displayed at the Senckenberg Museum in Frankfurt. It is a complete specimen, 85 cm tall, of the subspecies Dicerorhinus tagicus moguntianus. This is a forerunner to the Sumatran Rhinoceros (Dicerorhinus sumatrensis), which reaches a shoulder height of 110 to 150 cm, and which is also now threatened with extinction. Crocodile fossils have also been unearthed in Budenheim. At the Naturhistorisches Museum Mainz stands a copy of the 20,000,000-year-old rhinoceros presented as the Budenheimer Nashorn (“Budenheim Rhinoceros”) in view of the place where it was found.

== Culture and sightseeing ==
=== Regular events ===
==== Budenheimer Blütenfest ====
The Budenheim Flower Festival has since 1955 been celebrated at the onset of the blossoming season each year on the last weekend in April by choosing a Flower Queen. There are also two Flower Princesses to go with the Queen, and for one year they represent the Municipality of Budenheim on special occasions.

==== Budenheimer Straßenfest ====
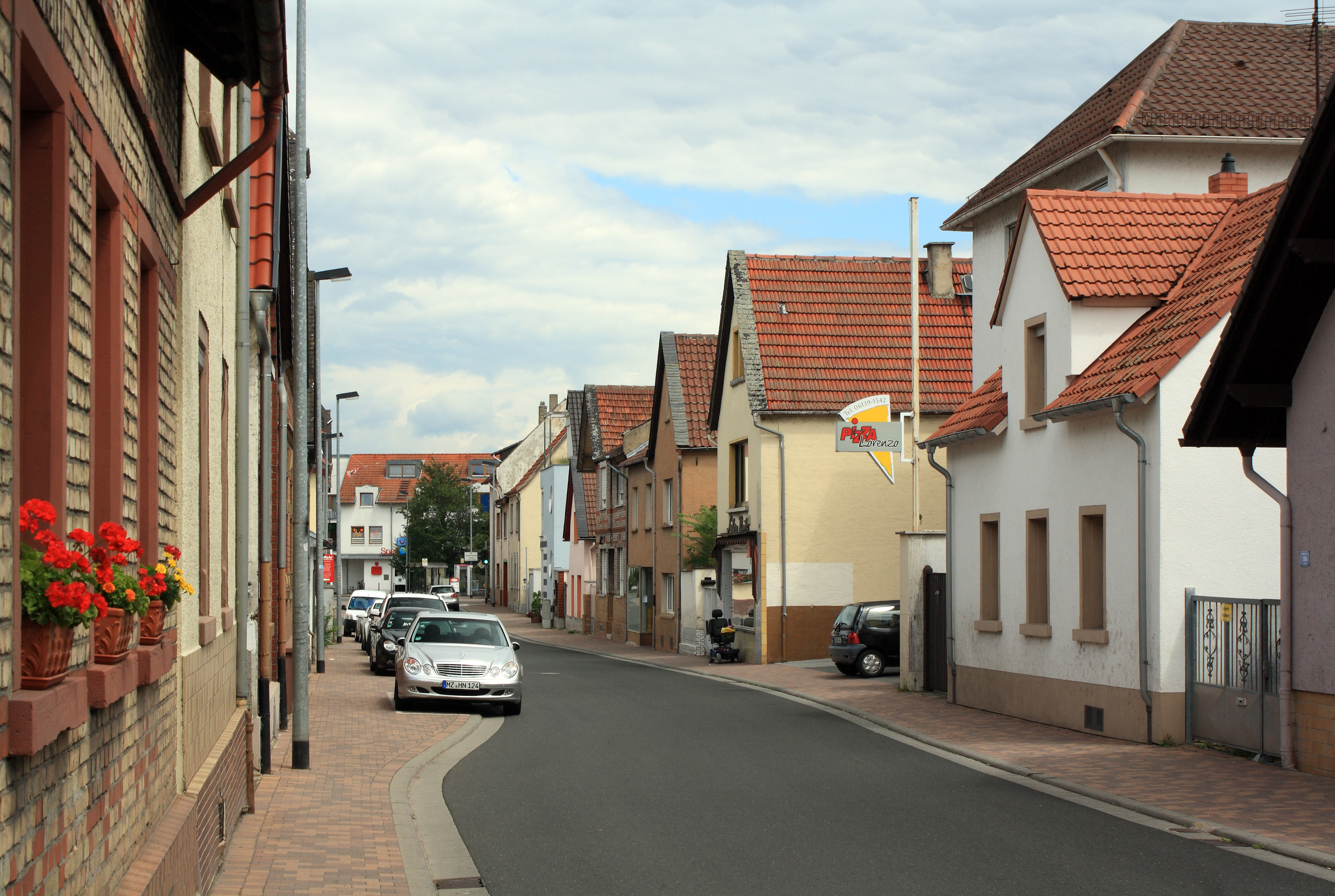
The Binger Street

The Budenheim Street Festival had its beginnings in the municipality's 1,200-year jubilee in 1978. This folk festival is staged by the association of Budenheim's clubs along with the individual clubs therein. The festival is held over four days and includes the last weekend in the Rhineland-Palatinate summer holidays.

==== Budenheimer Kerb ====
The Budenheim kermis (church consecration festival) goes back to the consecration of the Catholic Saint Pancras's Church (Pankratiuskirche) on 3 September 1747 and is likewise held over four days, each year over the third weekend in September.

== Economy and infrastructure ==
The Chemische Fabrik Budenheim was founded in 1908 and has belonged to Geschwister Oetker Beteiligungen since 2021. The chemical specialist employs around 850 people at its site in Budenheim. “Budenheim” is shorthand for this chemical company in international communication and as such it has carried the municipality's name throughout the world.

=== Transport ===
- The Autobahn A 643 can be reached through the Mainz-Mombach interchange about 4 km away.
- Budenheim is a stop for local trains on Deutsche Bahn’s West Rhine Railway. Travel time to the main railway station in Mainz ranges from 6 to 10 minutes (as of June 2006).
- Budenheim is the last stop on the route of the city bus run by the Mainzer Verkehrsgesellschaft (“Mainz Transport Association”). Travel time to the main railway station in Mainz is 29 minutes (as of June 2006).

=== Documents ===
- Bild von Budenheim aus J.F. Dielmann, A. Fay, J. Becker (Zeichner): F.C. Vogels Panorama des Rheins, Bilder des rechten und linken Rheinufers, Lithographische Anstalt F.C. Vogel, Frankfurt 1833
