= Ute Granold =

German politician

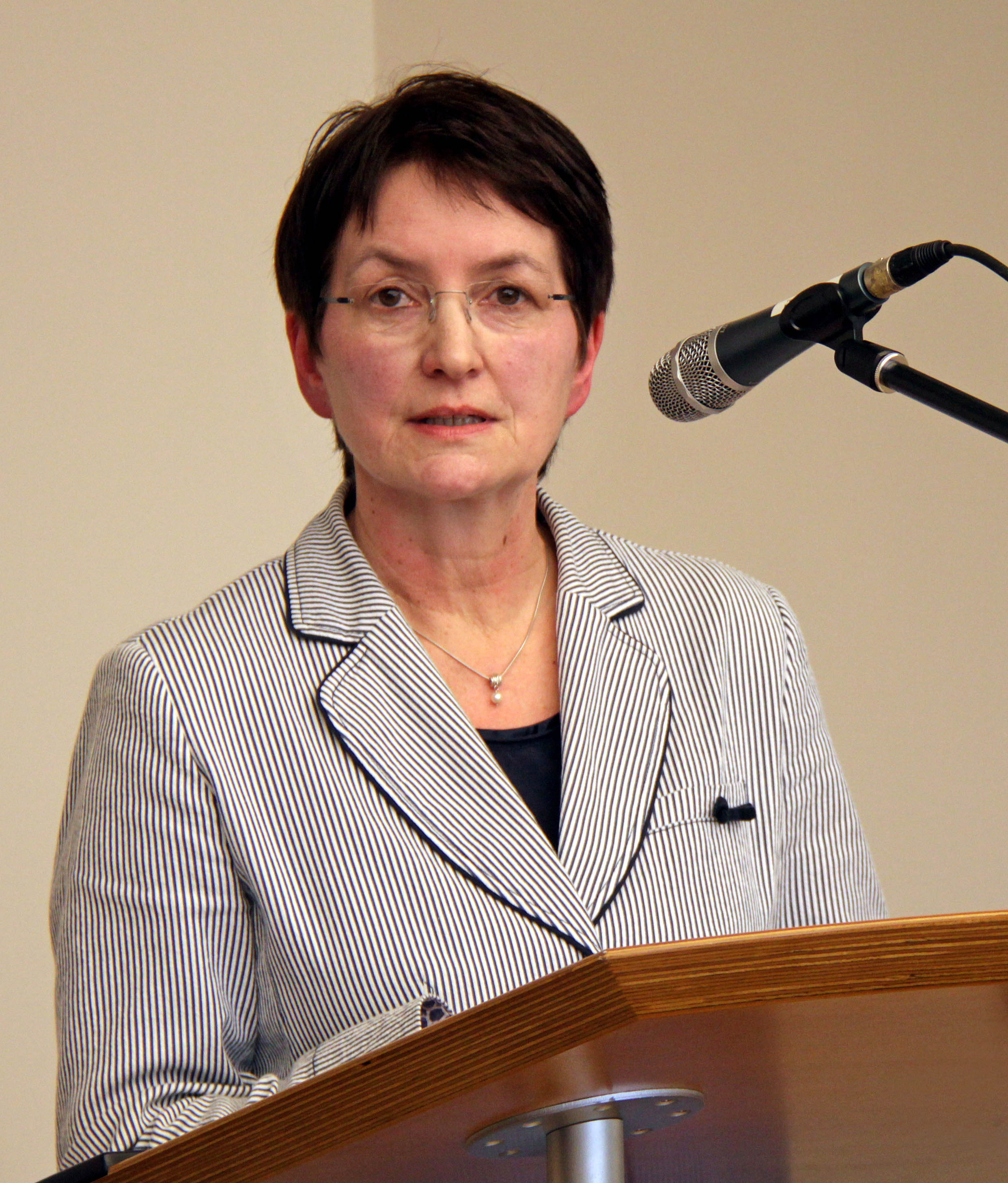

Mayor of Klein-Winternheim
- Incumbent
- Assumed office 1990

Member of the Bundestag
- In office 2002–2013

Personal details
- Born: March 2, 1955 (age 71) Mainz, Rhineland-Palatinate
- Party: Christian Democratic Union of Germany (CDU)
- Children: 2
- Education: Johannes Gutenberg University Mainz

Ute Granold (born March 2, 1955, in Mainz) is a German politician and member of the Christian Democratic Union of Germany (CDU). She was a member of the German Bundestag from 2002 to 2013, where she was most recently the chairwoman of the CDU/CSU parliamentary group in the Committee on Human Rights and Humanitarian Aid.

== Education ==
After graduating from the Maria-Ward-Schule in Mainz in 1973, Ute Granold studied law at the Johannes Gutenberg University in Mainz and passed the first state law examination in 1978. After the subsequent legal clerkship, she also passed the second state examination in 1982 and was admitted to the bar. From 1984 to 2001, she was a lecturer at the German Armed Forces College in Mainz.

== Political career ==
Ute Granold joined the Young Union (German: Junge Union) and the CDU as a schoolgirl in 1972. She is also involved in the Working Group of Christian Democratic Lawyers, the Women Union (Organization of all female members of the CDU, German: Frauen Union) and the Local Politics Association of the CDU and CSU. She is a member of the Berliner Kreis, an informal conservative group within the CDU consisting of realignment skepticism in era Merkel.

She has been a member of the Klein-Winternheim municipal council since 1984 and of the Mainz-Bingen district council since 1994. From 1996 to 2002, Granold was also a member of the state parliament of Rhineland-Palatinate. There, she was the spokeswoman for women's policy and most recently also the legal advisor to the CDU parliamentary group in the state parliament.

From 2002 to 2013, she was a member of the German Bundestag. Here she was a member of the Legal Affairs Committee and spokeswoman on family law issues for the Legal Affairs Working Group of the CDU/CSU parliamentary group. She was also a member of the Committee on Human Rights and Humanitarian Aid and rapporteur for the CDU/CSU parliamentary group on the issues of women, children, youth, human trafficking and the regions of the Balkans and Latin America. She also represented the parliamentary group in the Foreign Office's Humanitarian Aid Coordination Committee.

In 2006 and 2007, she delivered her parliamentary group's speeches in the Bundestag on the amendment to the Civil Partnership Act proposed by Alliance 90/The Greens and the FDP. In 2006, she held out the prospect that the CDU/CSU would be willing to talk about better tax treatment for registered civil partners. In 2007, however, she defended the behavior of her parliamentary group, which had postponed any debate on the subject in committee, on the grounds that other amendments that had already come into force in 2005 might not be constitutional. A corresponding evaluation by the Federal Constitutional Court is still pending. It is not intended to anticipate this.

Granold entered the Bundestag in 2002 and 2005 on the state list for Rhineland-Palatinate. In the 2009 federal election, she won the direct mandate, beating Michael Hartmann of the SPD in the Mainz constituency. Granold did not run again for the 2013 Bundestag election.

Ute Granold has been a member of the advisory board of the Federal Association of Oriental Christians of Germany (ZOCD) and a member of the board of trustees of the German Institute for Human Rights since 2016.

Granold has been mayor of Klein-Winternheim, her place of residence, since 1990. She was last re-elected for a five-year term in the 2019 local elections. Granold was a member of the Board of Trustees of the Fridtjof Nansen Academy for Political Education until she left the German Bundestag in 2013.
