= List of members of the 17th Bundestag =

17th Bundestag
←	16th	18th	→
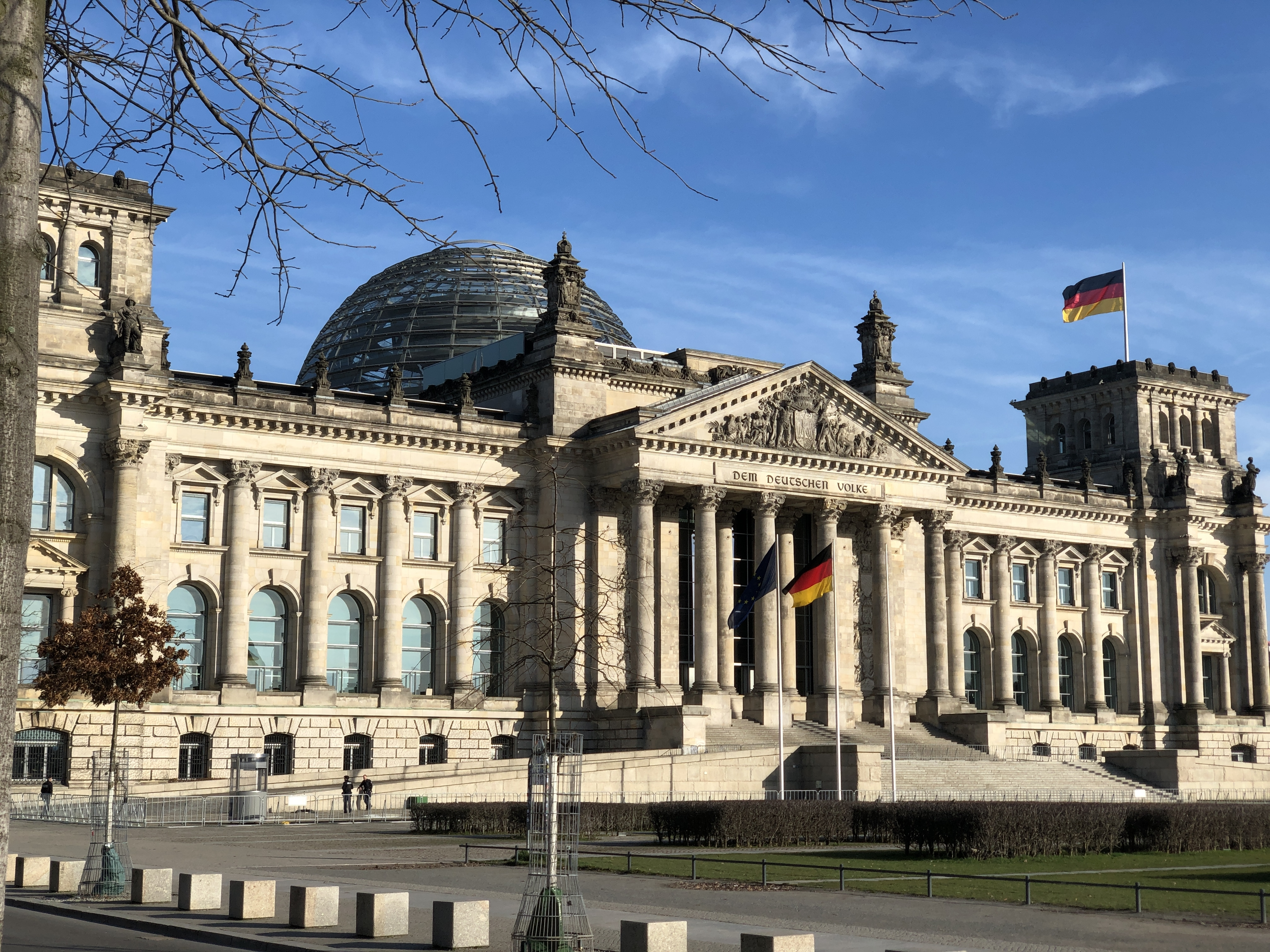
- Reichstag building in 2020

Overview
- Legislative body: Bundestag
- Jurisdiction: Germany
- Meeting place: Reichstag building, Berlin

Bundestag
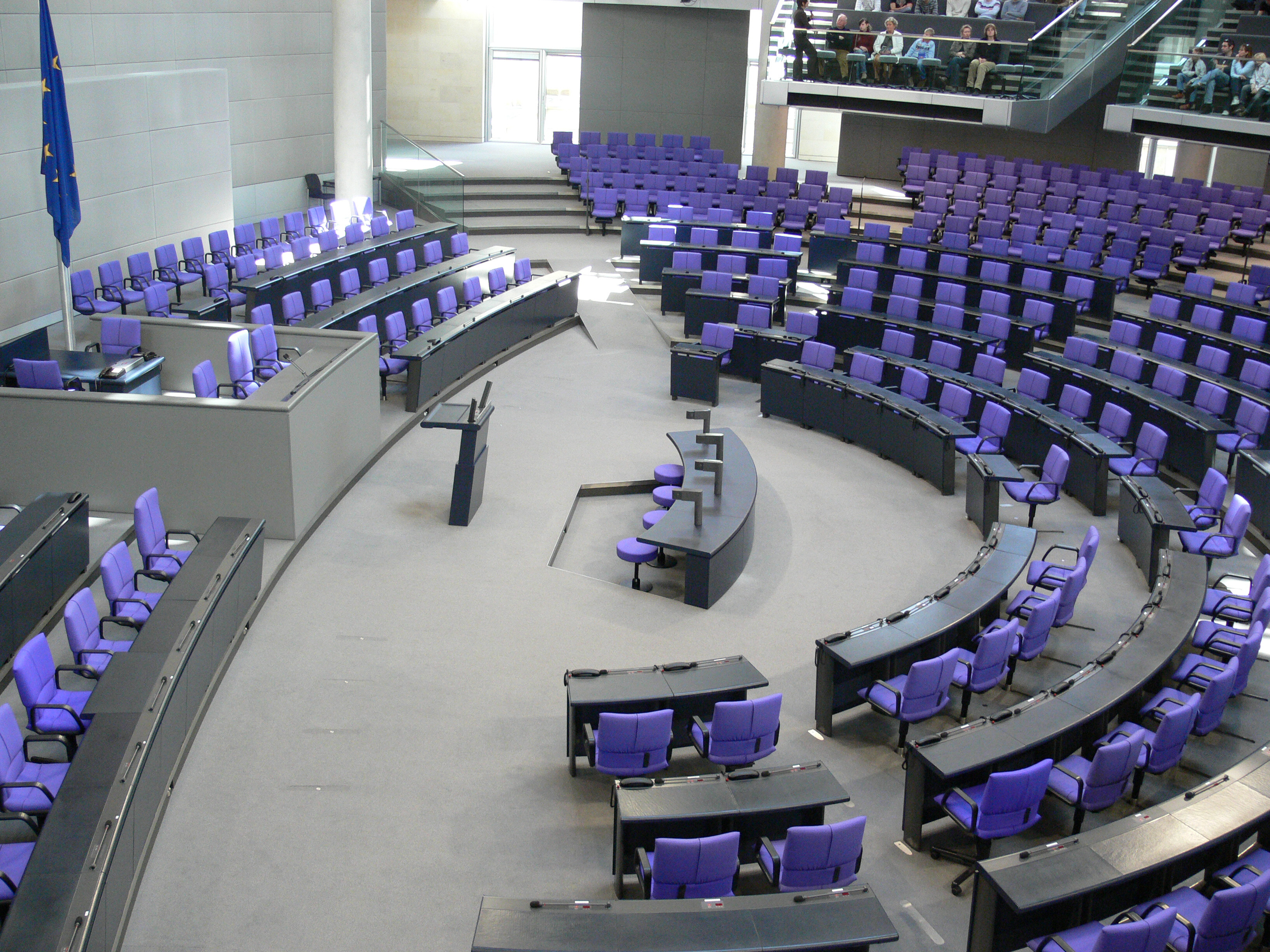
- Members: 736

Below is a list of members of the 17th Bundestag, the lower house of parliament of the Federal Republic of Germany, which convened on 27 October 2009 and was in office until 22 October 2013. The (default) listing is as follows: the states (Bundesländer) in the order of the numbering of the electoral districts; then the parties in the order of their votes (CDU, SPD, FDP, Linke, Grüne, CSU); within the parties' first district winners, then members of the Bundestag via the lists.

== Overview ==
This summary includes changes in the numbers of the five caucuses (CDU/CSU, SPD, FDP, The Left, Greens):

Date	Reason of change	CDU/CSU	SPD	FDP	Left	Greens	others	Total number
27 October 2009	First meeting	239	146	93	76	68	0	622
3 March 2011	Karl-Theodor zu Guttenberg resigns; his seat was an overhung seat	238	146	93	76	68	0	621
27 May 2011	Julia Klöckner resigns; her seat was an overhung seat	237	146	93	76	68	0	620
13 December 2012	Wolfgang Nešković leaves The Left caucus	237	146	93	75	68	1	620

== Current and former members of the Bundestag ==
Land	Name	Party	district	list	notes
Schleswig-Holstein	Börnsen, Wolfgang	CDU	district 001 Flensburg – Schleswig	list (no. 04)	
Schleswig-Holstein	Liebing, Ingbert	CDU	district 002	list (no. 07)	
Schleswig-Holstein	Koschorrek, Rolf	CDU	district 003	list (no. 08)	
Schleswig-Holstein	Wadephul, Johann David	CDU	district 004	list (no. 01)	
Schleswig-Holstein	Murmann, Philipp	CDU	district 006	list (no. 10)	
Schleswig-Holstein	Schröder, Ole	CDU	district 007	list (no. 02)	
Schleswig-Holstein	Storjohann, Gero	CDU	district 008	list (no. 05)	
Schleswig-Holstein	Gädechens, Ingo	CDU	district 009	list (no. 09)	
Schleswig-Holstein	Brackmann, Norbert	CDU	district 010	list (no. 11)	
Schleswig-Holstein	Bartels, Hans-Peter	SPD	district 005	list (no. 06)	
Schleswig-Holstein	Hiller-Ohm, Gabriele	SPD	district 011	list (no. 04)	
Schleswig-Holstein	Rossmann, Ernst Dieter	SPD	district 007	list (no. 01)	
Schleswig-Holstein	Hagedorn, Bettina	SPD	district 009	list (no. 02)	
Schleswig-Holstein	Thönnes, Franz	SPD	district 008	list (no. 03)	
Schleswig-Holstein	Rix, Sönke	SPD	district 004	list (no. 05)	
Schleswig-Holstein	Koppelin, Jürgen	FDP	district 003	list (no. 01)	
Schleswig-Holstein	Happach-Kasan, Christel	FDP	district 010	list (no. 02)	
Schleswig-Holstein	Blumenthal, Sebastian	FDP	district 005	list (no. 03)	
Schleswig-Holstein	Aschenberg-Dugnus, Christine	FDP	district 004	list (no. 04)	
Schleswig-Holstein	Möhring, Cornelia	Linke	district 005	list (no. 01)	
Schleswig-Holstein	Sharma, Raju	Linke		list (no. 02)	
Schleswig-Holstein	Nestle, Ingrid	Grüne	district 001 Flensburg – Schleswig	list (no. 01)	resigned 14 June 2012
Schleswig-Holstein	von Notz, Konstantin	Grüne	district 010	list (no. 02)	
Schleswig-Holstein	Wilms, Valerie	Grüne	district 007	list (no. 03)	
Schleswig-Holstein	Wagner, Arfst	Grüne		list (no. 04)	since 18 June 2012
Mecklenburg-Vorpommern	Strenz, Karin	CDU	district 012	list (no. 05)	
Mecklenburg-Vorpommern	Monstadt, Dietrich	CDU	district 013	list (no. 04)	
Mecklenburg-Vorpommern	Merkel, Angela	CDU	district 015	list (no. 01)	
Mecklenburg-Vorpommern	Lietz, Matthias	CDU	district 016	list (no. 03)	
Mecklenburg-Vorpommern	Rehberg, Eckhardt	CDU	district 017	list (no. 02)	
Mecklenburg-Vorpommern	Poland, Christoph	CDU	district 018	list (no. 06)	
Mecklenburg-Vorpommern	Hacker, Hans-Joachim	SPD	district 013	list (no. 01)	
Mecklenburg-Vorpommern	Steffen, Sonja Amalie	SPD	district 015	list (no. 02)	
Mecklenburg-Vorpommern	Ahrendt, Christian	FDP	district 013	list (no. 01)	resigned 8 January 2013
Mecklenburg-Vorpommern	Reinhold, Hagen	FDP	district 014	list (no. 02)	since 11 January 2013
Mecklenburg-Vorpommern	Bockhahn, Steffen	Linke	district 014		
Mecklenburg-Vorpommern	Bartsch, Dietmar	Linke	district 013	list (no. 01)	
Mecklenburg-Vorpommern	Bunge, Martina	Linke	district 012	list (no. 02)	
Mecklenburg-Vorpommern	Bluhm, Heidrun	Linke	district 017	list (no. 03)	
Mecklenburg-Vorpommern	Terpe, Harald	Grüne	district 014	list (no. 01)	
Hamburg	Kruse, Rüdiger	CDU	district 021	list (no. 04)	
Hamburg	Fischer, Dirk	CDU	district 022	list (no. 01)	
Hamburg	Klimke, Jürgen	CDU	district 023	list (no. 02)	
Hamburg	Weinberg, Marcus	CDU	district 020	list (no. 03)	
Hamburg	Kahrs, Johannes	SPD	district 019		
Hamburg	Scholz, Olaf	SPD	district 020	list (no. 01)	resigned 11 March 2011
Hamburg	Klose, Hans-Ulrich	SPD	district 024		
Hamburg	Özoğuz, Aydan	SPD		list (no. 02)	
Hamburg	Egloff, Ingo	SPD	district 023	list (no. 03)	since 11 March 2011
Hamburg	Müller-Sönksen, Burkhardt	FDP	district 021	list (no. 01)	
Hamburg	Canel, Sylvia	FDP		list (no. 02)	
Hamburg	van Aken, Jan	Linke		list (no. 01)	
Hamburg	Sager, Krista	Grüne	district 021	list (no. 01)	
Hamburg	Sarrazin, Manuel	Grüne	district 024	list (no. 02)	
Niedersachsen	Connemann, Gitta	CDU	district 026	list (no. 12)	
Niedersachsen	Kossendey, Thomas	CDU	district 028	list (no. 05)	
Niedersachsen	Grotelüschen, Astrid	CDU	district 029	list (no. 21)	resigned 27 April 2010
Niedersachsen	Ferlemann, Enak	CDU	district 030	list (no. 08)	
Niedersachsen	Krogmann, Martina	CDU	district 031	list (no. 03)	resigned 1 April 2010
Niedersachsen	Kues, Hermann	CDU	district 032	list (no. 04)	
Niedersachsen	Holzenkamp, Franz-Josef	CDU	district 033	list (no. 30)	
Niedersachsen	Knoerig, Axel	CDU	district 034	list (no. 26)	
Niedersachsen	Mattfeldt, Andreas	CDU	district 035	list (no. 28)	
Niedersachsen	Grindel, Reinhard	CDU	district 036	list (no. 16)	
Niedersachsen	Grosse-Brömer, Michael	CDU	district 037	list (no. 07)	
Niedersachsen	Pols, Eckhard	CDU	district 038	list (no. 25)	
Niedersachsen	Schirmbeck, Georg	CDU	district 039	list (no. 24)	
Niedersachsen	Middelberg, Mathias	CDU	district 040	list (no. 14)	
Niedersachsen	Otte, Henning	CDU	district 045	list (no. 19)	
Niedersachsen	Lach, Günter	CDU	district 052	list (no. 27)	
Niedersachsen	von der Leyen, Ursula	CDU	district 043	list (no. 01)	
Niedersachsen	von Klaeden, Eckart	CDU	district 049	list (no. 02)	
Niedersachsen	Flachsbarth, Maria	CDU	district 048	list (no. 06)	
Niedersachsen	Pawelski, Rita	CDU	district 042	list (no. 09)	
Niedersachsen	Fischer, Hartwig	CDU	district 054	list (no. 10)	
Niedersachsen	Kammer, Hans-Werner	CDU	district 027	list (no. 13)	since 1 April 2010
Niedersachsen	Klamt, Ewa	CDU	district 046	list (no. 15)	since 29 April 2010
Niedersachsen	Duin, Garrelt	SPD	district 025	list (no. 01)	resigned 21 June 2012
Niedersachsen	Evers-Meyer, Karin	SPD	district 027	list (no. 04)	
Niedersachsen	Edathy, Sebastian	SPD	district 041	list (no. 15)	
Niedersachsen	Tack, Kerstin	SPD	district 042	list (no. 27)	
Niedersachsen	Bulmahn, Edelgard	SPD	district 043	list (no. 02)	
Niedersachsen	Marks, Caren	SPD	district 044	list (no. 12)	
Niedersachsen	Heil, Hubertus	SPD	district 046	list (no. 03)	
Niedersachsen	Lösekrug-Möller, Gabriele	SPD	district 047	list (no. 06)	
Niedersachsen	Miersch, Matthias	SPD	district 048	list (no. 10)	
Niedersachsen	Brinkmann, Bernhard	SPD	district 049	list (no. 22)	
Niedersachsen	Gabriel, Sigmar	SPD	district 050	list (no. 24)	
Niedersachsen	Reimann, Carola	SPD	district 051	list (no. 17)	
Niedersachsen	Priesmeier, Wilhelm	SPD	district 053	list (no. 30)	
Niedersachsen	Oppermann, Thomas	SPD	district 054	list (no. 05)	
Niedersachsen	Klingbeil, Lars	SPD	district 036	list (no. 07)	
Niedersachsen	Lühmann, Kirsten	SPD	district 045	list (no. 08)	
Niedersachsen	Ortel, Holger	SPD	district 029	list (no. 09)	
Niedersachsen	Barchmann, Hans-Joachim	SPD	district 052	list (no. 11)	
Niedersachsen	Schwanholz, Martin	SPD	district 040	list (no. 13)	
Niedersachsen	Groneberg, Gabriele	SPD	district 033	list (no. 14)	since 26 June 2012
Niedersachsen	Thiele, Carl-Ludwig	FDP	district 040	list (no. 01)	resigned 5 May 2010
Niedersachsen	Winterstein, Claudia	FDP	district 042	list (no. 02)	
Niedersachsen	Goldmann, Hans-Michael	FDP	district 026	list (no. 03)	
Niedersachsen	Brunkhorst, Angelika	FDP	district 029	list (no. 04)	
Niedersachsen	Döring, Patrick	FDP	district 043	list (no. 05)	
Niedersachsen	Bracht-Bendt, Nicole	FDP	district 037	list (no. 06)	
Niedersachsen	Bernschneider, Florian	FDP	district 051	list (no. 07)	
Niedersachsen	Tören, Serkan	FDP	district 031	list (no. 08)	
Niedersachsen	Knopek, Lutz	FDP	district 054	list (no. 09)	
Niedersachsen	Ratjen-Damerau, Christiane	FDP	district 028	list (no. 10)	since 5 May 2010
Niedersachsen	Dehm-Desoi, Jörg-Diether	Linke		list (no. 01)	
Niedersachsen	Menzner, Dorothée	Linke	district 052	list (no. 02)	
Niedersachsen	Dittrich, Heidrun	Linke	district 043	list (no. 03)	
Niedersachsen	Schui, Herbert	Linke	district 037	list (no. 04)	resigned 1 November 2010
Niedersachsen	Krellmann, Jutta	Linke	district 047	list (no. 05)	
Niedersachsen	Behrens, Herbert	Linke	district 035	list (no. 06)	
Niedersachsen	Voß, Johanna	Linke	district 038	list (no. 07)	since 1 November 2010
Niedersachsen	Pothmer, Brigitte	Grüne	district 049	list (no. 01)	
Niedersachsen	Trittin, Jürgen	Grüne	district 054	list (no. 02)	
Niedersachsen	Steiner, Dorothea	Grüne	district 040	list (no. 03)	
Niedersachsen	Hoppe, Thilo	Grüne	district 025	list (no. 04)	
Niedersachsen	Keul, Katja	Grüne	district 041	list (no. 05)	
Niedersachsen	Kindler, Sven-Christian	Grüne	district 036	list (no. 06)	
Niedersachsen	von Cramon-Taubadel, Viola	Grüne	district 053	list (no. 07)	
Bremen	Neumann, Bernd	CDU	district 056	list (no. 01)	
Bremen	Sieling, Carsten	SPD	district 055	list (no. 03)	
Bremen	Beckmeyer, Uwe	SPD	district 056	list (no. 01)	
Bremen	Staffeldt, Torsten	FDP	district 055	list (no. 01)	
Bremen	Alpers, Agnes	Linke		list (no. 01)	
Bremen	Beck, Marieluise	Grüne	district 055	list (no. 01)	
Brandenburg	Stübgen, Michael	CDU	district 066	list (no. 02)	
Brandenburg	Reiche, Katherina	CDU	district 062	list (no. 01)	
Brandenburg	Voßhoff, Andrea	CDU	district 061	list (no. 03)	
Brandenburg	Koeppen, Jens	CDU	district 058	list (no. 04)	
Brandenburg	von der Marwitz, Hans-Georg	CDU	district 060	list (no. 05)	
Brandenburg	Ziegler, Dagmar	SPD	district 057	list (no. 02)	
Brandenburg	Krüger-Leißner, Angelika	SPD	district 059	list (no. 06)	
Brandenburg	Steinmeier, Frank-Walter	SPD	district 061	list (no. 01)	
Brandenburg	Wicklein, Andrea	SPD	district 062	list (no. 04)	
Brandenburg	Danckert, Dr. Peter	SPD	district 063	list (no. 03)	
Brandenburg	Lanfermann, Heinz	FDP	district 061	list (no. 01)	
Brandenburg	Neumann, Martin	FDP	district 065	list (no. 02)	
Brandenburg	Stüber, Sabine	Linke	district 058	list (no. 09)	
Brandenburg	Enkelmann, Dagmar	Linke	district 060	list (no. 01)	
Brandenburg	Nord, Thomas	Linke	district 064	list (no. 02)	
Brandenburg	Nešković, Wolfgang	no caucus	district 065	list (no. 04)	left Linke caucus on 13 December 2012
Brandenburg	Tackmann, Kirsten	Linke	district 057	list (no. 03)	
Brandenburg	Golze, Diana	Linke	district 061	list (no. 05)	
Brandenburg	Behm, Cornelia	Grüne	district 062	list (no. 01)	
Sachsen-Anhalt	Behrens, Manfred	CDU	district 068	list (no. 08)	
Sachsen-Anhalt	Brehmer, Heike	CDU	district 069	list (no. 06)	
Sachsen-Anhalt	Petzold, Ulrich	CDU	district 071	list (no. 04)	
Sachsen-Anhalt	Stier, Dieter	CDU	district 074	list (no. 07)	
Sachsen-Anhalt	Bergner, Christoph	CDU	district 073	list (no. 01)	
Sachsen-Anhalt	Wolff, Waltrud	SPD	district 068	list (no. 01)	
Sachsen-Anhalt	Lischka, Burkhard	SPD	district 070	list (no. 02)	
Sachsen-Anhalt	Schmidt, Sylvia	SPD	district 075	list (no. 03)	
Sachsen-Anhalt	Pieper, Cornelia	FDP	district 073	list (no. 01)	
Sachsen-Anhalt	Ackermann, Jens	FDP	district 068	list (no. 02)	
Sachsen-Anhalt	Kunert, Katrin	Linke	district 067	list (no. 03)	
Sachsen-Anhalt	Hein, Rosemarie	Linke	district 070	list (no. 05)	
Sachsen-Anhalt	Korte, Jan	Linke	district 072	list (no. 02)	
Sachsen-Anhalt	Sitte, Petra	Linke	district 073	list (no. 01)	
Sachsen-Anhalt	Koch, Harald	Linke	district 075	list (no. 06)	
Sachsen-Anhalt	Claus, Roland	Linke	district 074	list (no. 04)	
Sachsen-Anhalt	Kurth, Undine	Grüne	district 069	list (no. 01)	
Berlin	Steffel, Frank	CDU	district 078	list (no. 04)	
Berlin	Wegner, Kai	CDU	district 079	list (no. 05)	
Berlin	Wellmann, Karl-Georg	CDU	district 080	list (no. 02)	
Berlin	Luczak, Jan-Marco	CDU	district 082	list (no. 07)	
Berlin	Vogelsang, Stefanie	CDU	district 083	list (no. 03)	
Berlin	Grütters, Monika	CDU	district 086	list (no. 01)	
Berlin	Högl, Eva	SPD	district 076	list (no. 07)	
Berlin	Merkel, Petra	SPD	district 081	list (no. 02)	
Berlin	Thierse, Wolfgang	SPD	district 077	list (no. 01)	
Berlin	Schulz, Swen	SPD	district 079	list (no. 03)	
Berlin	Rawert, Mechthild	SPD	district 082	list (no. 04)	
Berlin	Lindner, Martin	FDP	district 077	list (no. 01)	
Berlin	Lindemann, Lars	FDP		list (no. 02)	
Berlin	Königshaus, Hellmut	FDP	district 085	list (no. 03)	resigned 20 May 2010
Berlin	Krestel, Holger	FDP	district 082	list (no. 04)	since 20 May 2010
Berlin	Liebich, Stefan	Linke	district 077	list (no. 04)	
Berlin	Gysi, Gregor	Linke	district 085	list (no. 01)	
Berlin	Pau, Petra	Linke	district 086	list (no. 02)	
Berlin	Lötzsch, Gesine	Linke	district 087	list (no. 03)	
Berlin	Wawzyniak, Halina	Linke	district 084	list (no. 05)	
Berlin	Ströbele, Hans-Christian	Grüne	district 084		
Berlin	Künast, Renate	Grüne	district 082	list (no. 01)	
Berlin	Wieland, Wolfgang	Grüne	district 076	list (no. 02)	
Berlin	Paus, Elisabeth	Grüne	district 081	list (no. 03)	
Nordrhein-Westfalen	Henke, Rudolf	CDU	district 088	list (no. 41)	
Nordrhein-Westfalen	Brandt, Helmut	CDU	district 089	list (no. 29)	
Nordrhein-Westfalen	Dautzenberg, Leo	CDU	district 090	list (no. 54)	resigned 1 February 2011
Nordrhein-Westfalen	Rachel, Thomas	CDU	district 091	list (no. 14)	
Nordrhein-Westfalen	Zylajew, Willi	CDU	district 092	list (no. 23)	
Nordrhein-Westfalen	Seif, Detlef	CDU	district 093	list (no. 50)	
Nordrhein-Westfalen	Paul, Michael	CDU	district 095	list (no. 55)	
Nordrhein-Westfalen	Winkelmeier-Becker, Elisabeth	CDU	district 098	list (no. 21)	
Nordrhein-Westfalen	Röttgen, Norbert	CDU	district 099	list (no. 05)	
Nordrhein-Westfalen	Flosbach, Klaus-Peter	CDU	district 100	list (no. 34)	
Nordrhein-Westfalen	Bosbach, Wolfgang	CDU	district 101	list (no. 07)	
Nordrhein-Westfalen	Hardt, Jürgen	CDU	district 104	list (no. 48)	
Nordrhein-Westfalen	Noll, Michaela	CDU	district 105	list (no. 18)	
Nordrhein-Westfalen	Beyer, Peter	CDU	district 106	list (no. 53)	
Nordrhein-Westfalen	Jarzombek, Thomas	CDU	district 107	list (no. 44)	
Nordrhein-Westfalen	Philipp, Beatrix	CDU	district 108	list (no. 12)	
Nordrhein-Westfalen	Gröhe, Hermann	CDU	district 109	list (no. 13)	
Nordrhein-Westfalen	Krings, Günter	CDU	district 110	list (no. 31)	
Nordrhein-Westfalen	Heveling, Ansgar	CDU	district 111		
Nordrhein-Westfalen	Schummer, Uwe	CDU	district 112	list (no. 43)	
Nordrhein-Westfalen	Pofalla, Ronald	CDU	district 113	list (no. 02)	
Nordrhein-Westfalen	Weiss, Sabine	CDU	district 114	list (no. 24)	
Nordrhein-Westfalen	Spahn, Jens	CDU	district 125		
Nordrhein-Westfalen	Röring, Johannes	CDU	district 127		
Nordrhein-Westfalen	Schiewerling, Karl	CDU	district 128		
Nordrhein-Westfalen	Jasper, Dieter	CDU	district 129	list (no. 39)	
Nordrhein-Westfalen	Polenz, Ruprecht	CDU	district 130	list (no. 11)	
Nordrhein-Westfalen	Sendker, Reinhold	CDU	district 131		
Nordrhein-Westfalen	Brinkhaus, Ralph	CDU	district 132	list (no. 45)	
Nordrhein-Westfalen	Strothmann, Lena	CDU	district 133	list (no. 15)	
Nordrhein-Westfalen	Kampeter, Steffen	CDU	district 135	list (no. 08)	
Nordrhein-Westfalen	Herrmann, Jürgen	CDU	district 137		died 11 August 2012
Nordrhein-Westfalen	Linnemann, Carsten	CDU	district 138		
Nordrhein-Westfalen	Schulte-Drüggelte, Bernhard	CDU	district 147	list (no. 17)	
Nordrhein-Westfalen	Sensburg, Patrick	CDU	district 148		
Nordrhein-Westfalen	Klein, Volkmar	CDU	district 149	list (no. 32)	
Nordrhein-Westfalen	Heider, Matthias	CDU	district 150		
Nordrhein-Westfalen	Lammert, Norbert	CDU	district 141	list (no. 01)	
Nordrhein-Westfalen	Heinen-Esser, Ursula	CDU	district 094	list (no. 03)	
Nordrhein-Westfalen	Hintze, Peter	CDU	district 103	list (no. 04)	
Nordrhein-Westfalen	Fischbach, Ingrid	CDU	district 142	list (no. 06)	
Nordrhein-Westfalen	Dött, Marie-Luise	CDU	district 118	list (no. 09)	
Nordrhein-Westfalen	Brauksiepe, Ralf	CDU	district 140	list (no. 10)	
Nordrhein-Westfalen	Mißfelder, Philipp	CDU	district 122	list (no. 16)	
Nordrhein-Westfalen	Fritz, Erich	CDU	district 144	list (no. 19)	
Nordrhein-Westfalen	Caesar, Cajus	CDU	district 136	list (no. 20)	since 1 February 2011
Nordrhein-Westfalen	Hüppe, Hubert	CDU	district 145	list (no. 22)	since 16 August 2012
Nordrhein-Westfalen	Dörmann, Martin	SPD	district 094	list (no. 54)	
Nordrhein-Westfalen	Mützenich, Rolf	SPD	district 096	list (no. 67)	
Nordrhein-Westfalen	Kelber, Ulrich	SPD	district 097	list (no. 16)	
Nordrhein-Westfalen	Lauterbach, Karl	SPD	district 102	list (no. 49)	
Nordrhein-Westfalen	Zöllmer, Manfred	SPD	district 103	list (no. 50)	
Nordrhein-Westfalen	Ehrmand, Siegmund	SPD	district 115	list (no. 53)	
Nordrhein-Westfalen	Bas, Bärbel	SPD	district 116	list (no. 35)	
Nordrhein-Westfalen	Pflug, Johannes	SPD	district 117	list (no. 69)	
Nordrhein-Westfalen	Groschek, Michael	SPD	district 118	list (no. 65)	resigned 21 June 2012
Nordrhein-Westfalen	Schaaf, Anton	SPD	district 119	list (no. 57)	
Nordrhein-Westfalen	Hempelmann, Rolf	SPD	district 120	list (no. 61)	
Nordrhein-Westfalen	Hinz, Petra	SPD	district 121	list (no. 32)	
Nordrhein-Westfalen	Schwabe, Frank	SPD	district 122	list (no. 43)	
Nordrhein-Westfalen	Groß, Michael	SPD	district 123	list (no. 47)	
Nordrhein-Westfalen	Poß, Joachim	SPD	district 124	list (no. 56)	
Nordrhein-Westfalen	Gerdes, Michael	SPD	district 126	list (no. 51)	
Nordrhein-Westfalen	Schwartze, Stefan	SPD	district 134	list (no. 28)	
Nordrhein-Westfalen	Becker, Dirk	SPD	district 136	list (no. 33)	
Nordrhein-Westfalen	Röspel, René	SPD	district 139	list (no. 39)	
Nordrhein-Westfalen	Humme, Christel	SPD	district 140	list (no. 25)	
Nordrhein-Westfalen	Schäfer, Axel	SPD	district 141	list (no. 52)	
Nordrhein-Westfalen	Bollmann, Gerd	SPD	district 142		
Nordrhein-Westfalen	Bülow, Marco	SPD	district 143	list (no. 55)	
Nordrhein-Westfalen	Burchardt, Ursula	SPD	district 144	list (no. 27)	
Nordrhein-Westfalen	Kaczmarek, Oliver	SPD	district 145	list (no. 48)	
Nordrhein-Westfalen	Wiefelspütz, Dieter	SPD	district 146	list (no. 45)	
Nordrhein-Westfalen	Freitag, Dagmar	SPD	district 151	list (no. 07)	
Nordrhein-Westfalen	Müntefering, Franz	SPD		list (no. 01)	
Nordrhein-Westfalen	Schwall-Düren, Angelica	SPD	district 128	list (no. 02)	resigned 15 July 2010
Nordrhein-Westfalen	Steinbrück, Peer	SPD	district 105	list (no. 03)	
Nordrhein-Westfalen	Schmidt, Ulla	SPD	district 088	list (no. 04)	
Nordrhein-Westfalen	Brase, Willi	SPD	district 149	list (no. 05)	
Nordrhein-Westfalen	Brandner, Klaus	SPD	district 132	list (no. 06)	
Nordrhein-Westfalen	Strässer, Christoph	SPD	district 130	list (no. 08)	
Nordrhein-Westfalen	Hendricks, Barbara	SPD	district 113	list (no. 09)	
Nordrhein-Westfalen	Arndt-Brauer, Ingrid	SPD	district 125	list (no. 10)	
Nordrhein-Westfalen	Dietmar Nietan	SPD	district 091	list (no. 11)	
Nordrhein-Westfalen	Crone, Petra	SPD	district 150	list (no. 12)	
Nordrhein-Westfalen	Scheelen, Bernd	SPD	district 111	list (no. 13)	
Nordrhein-Westfalen	Griese, Kerstin	SPD	district 106	list (no. 14)	since 23 July 2010
Nordrhein-Westfalen	Hellmich, Wolfgang	SPD	district 147	list (no. 15)	since 22 June 2012
Nordrhein-Westfalen	Westerwelle, Guido	FDP	district 097	list (no. 01)	
Nordrhein-Westfalen	Piltz, Gisela	FDP	district 107	list (no. 02)	
Nordrhein-Westfalen	van Essen, Jörg	FDP	district 146	list (no. 03)	
Nordrhein-Westfalen	Hoyer, Werner	FDP	district 095	list (no. 04)	resigned 1 January 2012
Nordrhein-Westfalen	Kopp, Gudrun	FDP	district 136	list (no. 05)	
Nordrhein-Westfalen	Flach, Ulrike	FDP	district 119	list (no. 06)	
Nordrhein-Westfalen	Fricke, Otto	FDP	district 111	list (no. 07)	
Nordrhein-Westfalen	Bahr, Daniel	FDP	district 130	list (no. 08)	
Nordrhein-Westfalen	Lindner, Christian	FDP	district 101	list (no. 09)	resigned 10 July 2012
Nordrhein-Westfalen	Kauch, Michael	FDP	district 143	list (no. 10)	
Nordrhein-Westfalen	Schäffler, Frank	FDP	district 134	list (no. 11)	
Nordrhein-Westfalen	Friedhoff, Paul	FDP	district 113	list (no. 12)	resigned 1 May 2012
Nordrhein-Westfalen	Djir-Sarai, Bijan	FDP	district 109	list (no. 13)	
Nordrhein-Westfalen	Müller, Petra	FDP	district 088	list (no. 14)	
Nordrhein-Westfalen	Daub, Helga	FDP	district 149	list (no. 15)	
Nordrhein-Westfalen	Vogel, Johannes	FDP	district 150	list (no. 16)	
Nordrhein-Westfalen	Bögel, Claudia	FDP	district 125	list (no. 17)	
Nordrhein-Westfalen	Molitor, Helga	FDP	district 093	list (no. 18)	
Nordrhein-Westfalen	Kamp, Heiner	FDP	district 132	list (no. 19)	
Nordrhein-Westfalen	Buschmann, Marco	FDP	district 124	list (no. 20)	
Nordrhein-Westfalen	von Polheim, Jörg	FDP	district 100	list (no. 21)	since 4 January 2012
Nordrhein-Westfalen	Todtenhausen, Manfred	FDP	district 103	list (no. 22)	since 2 May 2012
Nordrhein-Westfalen	Ehrenberg, Hans-Werner	FDP	district 148	list (no. 23)	since 10 July 2012
Nordrhein-Westfalen	Lötzer, Ursula	Linke	district 096	list (no. 01)	
Nordrhein-Westfalen	Jelpke, Ulla	Linke	district 144	list (no. 02)	
Nordrhein-Westfalen	Höger, Inge	Linke	district 134	list (no. 03)	
Nordrhein-Westfalen	Schäfer, Paul	Linke	district 097	list (no. 04)	
Nordrhein-Westfalen	Wagenknecht, Sahra	Linke	district 108	list (no. 05)	
Nordrhein-Westfalen	Hunko, Andrej	Linke	district 088	list (no. 06)	
Nordrhein-Westfalen	Dağdelen, Sevim	Linke	district 141	list (no. 07)	
Nordrhein-Westfalen	Movassat, Niema	Linke	district 118	list (no. 08)	
Nordrhein-Westfalen	Remmers, Ingrid	Linke		list (no. 09)	
Nordrhein-Westfalen	Birkwald, Matthias	Linke	district 095	list (no. 10)	
Nordrhein-Westfalen	Vogler, Kathrin	Linke	district 129	list (no. 11)	
Nordrhein-Westfalen	Höhn, Bärbel	Grüne	district 118	list (no. 01)	
Nordrhein-Westfalen	Beck, Volker	Grüne	district 095	list (no. 02)	
Nordrhein-Westfalen	Haßelmann, Britta	Grüne	district 133	list (no. 03)	
Nordrhein-Westfalen	Schmidt, Frithjof	Grüne	district 141	list (no. 04)	
Nordrhein-Westfalen	Dörner, Katja	Grüne	district 097	list (no. 05)	
Nordrhein-Westfalen	Kurth, Markus	Grüne	district 143	list (no. 06)	
Nordrhein-Westfalen	Koczy, Ute	Grüne	district 136	list (no. 07)	
Nordrhein-Westfalen	Krischer, Oliver	Grüne	district 091	list (no. 08)	
Nordrhein-Westfalen	Müller, Kerstin	Grüne	district 096	list (no. 09)	
Nordrhein-Westfalen	Gehring, Kai	Grüne	district 121	list (no. 10)	
Nordrhein-Westfalen	Klein-Schmeink, Maria	Grüne	district 130	list (no. 11)	
Nordrhein-Westfalen	Ott, Hermann	Grüne	district 103	list (no. 12)	
Nordrhein-Westfalen	Herlitzius, Bettina	Grüne	district 089	list (no. 13)	
Nordrhein-Westfalen	Ostendorff, Friedrich	Grüne	district 145	list (no. 14)	
Sachsen	Kolbe, Manfred	CDU	district 152		
Sachsen	Kudla, Bettina	CDU	district 153		
Sachsen	Feist, Thomas	CDU	district 154		
Sachsen	Landgraf, Barbara	CDU	district 155	list (no. 05)	
Sachsen	de Maizière, Thomas	CDU	district 156	list (no. 01)	
Sachsen	Michalk, Maria	CDU	district 157	list (no. 03)	
Sachsen	Kretschmer, Michael	CDU	district 158		
Sachsen	Brähmig, Klaus	CDU	district 159	list (no. 06)	
Sachsen	Lämmel, Andreas	CDU	district 160	list (no. 08)	
Sachsen	Vaatz, Arnold	CDU	district 161	list (no. 02)	
Sachsen	Bellmann, Veronika	CDU	district 162	list (no. 07)	
Sachsen	Heinrich, Frank	CDU	district 163		
Sachsen	Wanderwitz, Marco	CDU	district 164		
Sachsen	Baumann, Helmut	CDU	district 165		
Sachsen	Luther, Michael	CDU	district 166	list (no. 04)	
Sachsen	Hochbaum, Robert	CDU	district 167		
Sachsen	Tiefensee, Wolfgang	SPD	district 154	list (no. 01)	
Sachsen	Volkmer, Eva	SPD	district 160	list (no. 02)	
Sachsen	Schwanitz, Rolf	SPD	district 167	list (no. 03)	
Sachsen	Kolbe, Daniela	SPD	district 153	list (no. 04)	
Sachsen	Gunkel, Wolfgang	SPD	district 158	list (no. 05)	
Sachsen	Mücke, Jan	FDP	district 161	list (no. 01)	
Sachsen	Günther, Joachim	FDP	district 167	list (no. 02)	
Sachsen	Haustein, Heinz-Peter	FDP	district 165	list (no. 03)	
Sachsen	Deutschmann, Reiner	FDP	district 157	list (no. 04)	
Sachsen	Kipping, Katja	Linke	district 160	list (no. 01)	
Sachsen	Troost, Axel	Linke	district 155	list (no. 02)	
Sachsen	Höll, Barbara	Linke	district 153	list (no. 03)	
Sachsen	Seifert, Ilja	Linke	district 158	list (no. 04)	
Sachsen	Zimmermann, Sabine	Linke	district 166	list (no. 05)	
Sachsen	Leutert, Michael	Linke	district 163	list (no. 06)	
Sachsen	Lay, Caren	Linke	district 157	list (no. 07)	
Sachsen	Wunderlich, Jörn	Linke	district 164	list (no. 08)	
Sachsen	Lazar, Monika	Grüne	district 154	list (no. 01)	
Sachsen	Kühn, Stephan	Grüne	district 161	list (no. 02)	
Hessen	Pfeiffer, Sibylle	CDU	district 173	list (no. 06)	
Hessen	Braun, Helge	CDU	district 174	list (no. 10)	
Hessen	Brand, Michael	CDU	district 175	list (no. 18)	
Hessen	Haibach, Holger-Heinrich	CDU	district 176	list (no. 17)	resigned 1 March 2011
Hessen	Puttrich, Lucia	CDU	district 177	list (no. 14)	resigned 3 September 2010
Hessen	Willsch, Klaus-Peter	CDU	district 178	list (no. 16)	
Hessen	Schröder, Kristina	CDU	district 179	list (no. 08)	
Hessen	Tauber, Peter	CDU	district 180	list (no. 13)	
Hessen	Riesenhuber, Heinz	CDU	district 181	list (no. 02)	
Hessen	Zimmer, Matthias	CDU	district 182	list (no. 21)	
Hessen	Steinbach, Erika	CDU	district 183	list (no. 03)	
Hessen	Jung, Franz Josef	CDU	district 184	list (no. 01)	
Hessen	Wichtel, Peter	CDU	district 185	list (no. 12)	
Hessen	Lips, Patricia	CDU	district 187	list (no. 11)	
Hessen	Meister, Michael	CDU	district 188	list (no. 07)	
Hessen	Siebert, Bernd	CDU	district 171	list (no. 04)	since 6 September 2010
Hessen	Heiderich, Helmut	CDU	district 170	list (no. 15)	since 9 March 2011
Hessen	Meßmer, Ullrich	SPD	district 168	list (no. 05)	
Hessen	Gottschalck, Ulrike	SPD	district 169		
Hessen	Roth, Michael	SPD	district 170	list (no. 02)	
Hessen	Franke, Edgar	SPD	district 171	list (no. 07)	
Hessen	Bartol, Sören	SPD	district 172		
Hessen	Zypries, Brigitte	SPD	district 186	list (no. 03)	
Hessen	Wieczorek-Zeul, Heidemarie	SPD	district 179	list (no. 01)	
Hessen	Veit, Rüdiger	SPD	district 174	list (no. 04)	
Hessen	Lambrecht, Christine	SPD	district 188	list (no. 06)	
Hessen	Zapf, Uta	SPD	district 185	list (no. 08)	
Hessen	Reichenbach, Gerold	SPD	district 184	list (no. 09)	
Hessen	Raabe, Sascha	SPD	district 180	list (no. 10)	
Hessen	Gerhardt, Wolfgang	FDP	district 179	list (no. 01)	
Hessen	zu Solms-Hohensolms-Lich, Hermann Otto	FDP	district 174	list (no. 02)	
Hessen	Kolb, Heinrich	FDP	district 187	list (no. 03)	
Hessen	Otto, Hans-Joachim	FDP	district 182	list (no. 04)	
Hessen	Dyckmans, Mechthild	FDP	district 169	list (no. 05)	
Hessen	Ruppert, Stefan	FDP	district 176	list (no. 06)	
Hessen	Sänger, Björn	FDP	district 168	list (no. 07)	
Hessen	Schnurr, Christoph	FDP	district 183	list (no. 08)	
Hessen	Leidig, Sabine	Linke	district 187	list (no. 01)	
Hessen	Gehrcke-Reymann, Wolfgang	Linke	district 183	list (no. 02)	
Hessen	Buchholz, Christine	Linke	district 185	list (no. 03)	
Hessen	Dreibus, Werner	Linke	district 180	list (no. 04)	
Hessen	Hinz, Priska	Grüne	district 173	list (no. 01)	
Hessen	Nouripour, Omid	Grüne	district 183	list (no. 02)	
Hessen	Maisch, Nicole	Grüne	district 169	list (no. 03)	
Hessen	Koenigs, Thomas	Grüne	district 174	list (no. 04)	
Hessen	Wagner, Daniela	Grüne	district 186	list (no. 05)	
Hessen	Strengmann-Kuhn, Wolfgang	Grüne	district 181	list (no. 06)	
Thüringen	Grund, Manfred	CDU	district 189	list (no. 01)	
Thüringen	Hirte, Christian	CDU	district 190	list (no. 04)	
Thüringen	Selle, Johannes	CDU	district 191	list (no. 09)	
Thüringen	Schipanski, Tankred	CDU	district 192	list (no. 07)	
Thüringen	Tillmann, Antje	CDU	district 193	list (no. 02)	
Thüringen	Vogel, Volkmar	CDU	district 195	list (no. 03)	
Thüringen	Stauche, Carola	CDU	district 196	list (no. 06)	
Thüringen	Schneider, Carsten	SPD	district 193	list (no. 01)	
Thüringen	Gleicke, Iris	SPD	district 197	list (no. 02)	
Thüringen	Lemme, Steffen-Claudio	SPD	district 191	list (no. 03)	
Thüringen	Kurth, Patrick	FDP	district 191	list (no. 01)	
Thüringen	Röhlinger, Peter	FDP	district 194	list (no. 02)	
Thüringen	Lenkert, Ralph	Linke	district 194	list (no. 01)	
Thüringen	Petermann, Jens	Linke	district 197	list (no. 06)	
Thüringen	Jochimsen, Lukrezia	Linke		list (no. 02)	
Thüringen	Naumann, Kersten	Linke	district 191	list (no. 03)	
Thüringen	Tempel, Frank	Linke	district 195	list (no. 04)	
Thüringen	Göring-Eckardt, Katrin	Grüne	district 192	list (no. 01)	
Rheinland-Pfalz	Rüddel, Erwin	CDU	district 198	list (no. 13)	
Rheinland-Pfalz	Heil, Mechthild	CDU	district 199	list (no. 10)	
Rheinland-Pfalz	Fuchs, Michael	CDU	district 200	list (no. 08)	
Rheinland-Pfalz	Bleser, Peter	CDU	district 201	list (no. 04)	
Rheinland-Pfalz	Klöckner, Julia	CDU	district 202	list (no. 06)	resigned 27 May 2011
Rheinland-Pfalz	Schnieder, Patrick	CDU	district 203	list (no. 12)	
Rheinland-Pfalz	Kaster, Bernhard	CDU	district 204	list (no. 03)	
Rheinland-Pfalz	Hörster, Joachim	CDU	district 205	list (no. 01)	
Rheinland-Pfalz	Granold, Ute	CDU	district 206	list (no. 09)	
Rheinland-Pfalz	Böhmer, Maria	CDU	district 208	list (no. 02)	
Rheinland-Pfalz	Schindler, Norbert	CDU	district 209	list (no. 05)	
Rheinland-Pfalz	Schäfer, Anita	CDU	district 211	list (no. 07)	
Rheinland-Pfalz	Gebhart, Thomas	CDU	district 212	list (no. 11)	
Rheinland-Pfalz	Hagemann, Klaus	SPD	district 207	list (no. 09)	
Rheinland-Pfalz	Herzog, Gustav	SPD	district 210	list (no. 04)	
Rheinland-Pfalz	Nahles, Andreas	SPD	district 199	list (no. 01)	
Rheinland-Pfalz	Hartmann, Michael	SPD	district 206	list (no. 02)	
Rheinland-Pfalz	Barnett, Doris	SPD	district 208	list (no. 03)	
Rheinland-Pfalz	Körper, Fritz	SPD	district 202	list (no. 05)	
Rheinland-Pfalz	Bätzing, Sabine	SPD	district 198	list (no. 06)	
Rheinland-Pfalz	Nink, Manfred	SPD	district 204	list (no. 07)	
Rheinland-Pfalz	Brüderle, Rainer	FDP	district 206	list (no. 01)	
Rheinland-Pfalz	Wissing, Volker	FDP	district 212	list (no. 02)	
Rheinland-Pfalz	Hoff, Elke	FDP	district 198	list (no. 03)	
Rheinland-Pfalz	Geisen, Edmund	FDP	district 203	list (no. 04)	
Rheinland-Pfalz	Höferlin, Manuel	FDP	district 207	list (no. 05)	
Rheinland-Pfalz	Ulrich, Alexander	Linke	district 210	list (no. 01)	
Rheinland-Pfalz	Senger-Schäfer, Kathrin	Linke	district 208	list (no. 02)	
Rheinland-Pfalz	Werner, Katrin	Linke	district 204	list (no. 03)	
Rheinland-Pfalz	Höfken-Deipenbrock, Ulrike	Grüne	district 203	list (no. 01)	resigned 9 June 2011
Rheinland-Pfalz	Winkler, Josef Philip	Grüne	district 200	list (no. 02)	
Rheinland-Pfalz	Rößner, Tabea	Grüne	district 206	list (no. 03)	
Rheinland-Pfalz	Lindner, Tobias	Grüne	district 212	list (no. 06)	since 9 June 2011
Bayern	Pronold, Florian	SPD	district 230	list (no. 01)	
Bayern	Kastner, Susanne	SPD	district 248	list (no. 02)	
Bayern	Gloser, Günter	SPD	district 244	list (no. 03)	
Bayern	Ernstberger, Petra	SPD	district 239	list (no. 04)	
Bayern	Barthel, Klaus	SPD	district 224	list (no. 05)	
Bayern	Schieder, Marianne	SPD	district 234	list (no. 06)	
Bayern	Paula, Heinz	SPD	district 252	list (no. 07)	
Bayern	Graf, Angelika	SPD	district 233	list (no. 08)	
Bayern	Schurer, Ewald	SPD	district 214	list (no. 09)	
Bayern	Rupprecht, Marlene	SPD	district 243	list (no. 10)	
Bayern	Hofmann, Frank	SPD	district 250	list (no. 11)	
Bayern	Kramme, Anette	SPD	district 237	list (no. 12)	
Bayern	Burkert, Martin	SPD	district 245	list (no. 13)	
Bayern	Fograscher, Gabriele	SPD	district 254	list (no. 14)	
Bayern	Schieder, Werner	SPD	district 235	list (no. 15)	
Bayern	Kofler, Bärbel	SPD	district 225	list (no. 16)	
Bayern	Leutheusser-Schnarrenberger, Sabine	FDP	district 224	list (no. 01)	
Bayern	Stadler, Max	FDP	district 229	list (no. 02)	died 12 May 2013
Bayern	Stinner, Rainer	FDP	district 219	list (no. 03)	
Bayern	Meierhofer, Horst	FDP	district 233	list (no. 04)	
Bayern	Gruß, Miriam	FDP	district 252	list (no. 05)	
Bayern	Schuster, Marina	FDP	district 246	list (no. 06)	
Bayern	Volk, Daniel	FDP	district 221	list (no. 07)	
Bayern	Spatz, Joachim	FDP	district 251	list (no. 08)	
Bayern	Körber, Sebastian	FDP	district 236	list (no. 09)	
Bayern	Schulz, Jimmy	FDP	district 222	list (no. 10)	
Bayern	Thomae, Stephan	FDP	district 256	list (no. 11)	
Bayern	Lotter, Erwin	FDP	district 253	list (no. 12)	
Bayern	Breil, Klaus	FDP	district 226	list (no. 13)	
Bayern	Erdel, Rainer	FDP	district 241	list (no. 14)	
Bayern	Drexler, Gerhard	FDP	district 227	list (no. 15)	since 15 May 2013
Bayern	Ernst, Klaus	Linke	district 250	list (no. 01)	
Bayern	Bulling-Schröter, Eva	Linke	district 217	list (no. 02)	
Bayern	Möller, Kornelia	Linke	district 228	list (no. 03)	
Bayern	Weinberg, Harald	Linke	district 244	list (no. 04)	
Bayern	Gohlke, Nicole	Linke	district 219	list (no. 05)	
Bayern	Süßmair, Alexander	Linke	district 252	list (no. 06)	
Bayern	Roth, Claudia	Grüne	district 252	list (no. 01)	
Bayern	Fell, Hans-Josef	Grüne	district 248	list (no. 02)	
Bayern	Scheel, Christine	Grüne	district 247	list (no. 03)	resigned 16 January 2012
Bayern	Hofreiter, Anton	Grüne	district 222	list (no. 04)	
Bayern	Deligöz, Ekin	Grüne	district 255	list (no. 05)	
Bayern	Montag, Jerzy	Grüne	district 220	list (no. 06)	
Bayern	Scharfenberg, Elisabeth	Grüne	district 239	list (no. 07)	
Bayern	Gambke, Thomas	Grüne	district 228	list (no. 08)	
Bayern	Krumwiede, Agnes	Grüne	district 217	list (no. 09)	
Bayern	Kekeritz, Uwe	Grüne	district 243	list (no. 10)	
Bayern	Walter-Rosenheimer, Beate	Grüne	district 216	list (no. 11)	since 16 January 2012
Bayern	Mayer, Stephan	CSU	district 213		
Bayern	Lehmer, Max	CSU	district 214		
Bayern	Obermeier, Franz	CSU	district 215		
Bayern	Hasselfeldt, Gerda	CSU	district 216	list (no. 02)	
Bayern	Brandl, Reinhard	CSU	district 217		
Bayern	Singhammer, Johannes	CSU	district 218	list (no. 08)	
Bayern	Frankenhauser, Herbert	CSU	district 219	list (no. 18)	
Bayern	Gauweiler, Peter	CSU	district 220		
Bayern	Uhl, Hans-Peter	CSU	district 221	list (no. 19)	
Bayern	Hahn, Florian	CSU	district 222	list (no. 33)	
Bayern	Raab, Daniela	CSU	district 223	list (no. 13)	
Bayern	Aigner, Ilse	CSU	district 224	list (no. 04)	
Bayern	Ramsauer, Peter	CSU	district 225	list (no. 01)	
Bayern	Dobrindt, Alexander	CSU	district 226	list (no. 05)	
Bayern	Kalb, Bartholomäus	CSU	district 227		
Bayern	Götzer, Wolfgang	CSU	district 228		
Bayern	Scheuer, Andreas	CSU	district 229		
Bayern	Straubinger, Max	CSU	district 230		
Bayern	Hinsken, Ernst	CSU	district 231		
Bayern	Karl, Alois	CSU	district 232		
Bayern	Aumer, Peter	CSU	district 233		
Bayern	Holmeier, Karl	CSU	district 234		
Bayern	Rupprecht, Albert	CSU	district 235	list (no. 22)	
Bayern	Silberhorn, Thomas	CSU	district 236		
Bayern	Koschyk, Hartmut	CSU	district 237		
Bayern	Michelbach, Hans	CSU	district 238	list (no. 17)	
Bayern	Friedrich, Hans-Peter	CSU	district 239	list (no. 14)	
Bayern	zu Guttenberg, Karl-Theodor	CSU	district 240	list (no. 03)	resigned 3 March 2011
Bayern	Göppel, Josef	CSU	district 241		
Bayern	Müller, Stefan	CSU	district 242	list (no. 09)	
Bayern	Schmidt, Christian	CSU	district 243	list (no. 12)	
Bayern	Wöhrl, Dagmar	CSU	district 244	list (no. 06)	
Bayern	Frieser, Michael	CSU	district 245	list (no. 16)	
Bayern	Mortler, Marlene	CSU	district 246	list (no. 10)	
Bayern	Geis, Norbert	CSU	district 247		
Bayern	Bär, Dorothee	CSU	district 248	list (no. 07)	
Bayern	Zöller, Wolfgang	CSU	district 249	list (no. 15)	
Bayern	Glos, Michael	CSU	district 250		
Bayern	Lehrieder, Paul	CSU	district 251		
Bayern	Ruck, Christian	CSU	district 252	list (no. 21)	
Bayern	Oswald, Eduard	CSU	district 253		
Bayern	Lange, Ulrich	CSU	district 254		
Bayern	Nüßlein, Georg	CSU	district 255		
Bayern	Müller, Gerd	CSU	district 256	list (no. 11)	
Bayern	Stracke, Stephan	CSU	district 257		
Baden-Württemberg	Kaufmann, Stefan	CDU	district 258		
Baden-Württemberg	Maag, Karin	CDU	district 259	list (no. 08)	
Baden-Württemberg	Binninger, Clemens	CDU	district 260		
Baden-Württemberg	Grübel, Markus	CDU	district 261		
Baden-Württemberg	Hennrich, Michael	CDU	district 262		
Baden-Württemberg	Riegert, Klaus	CDU	district 263	list (no. 11)	
Baden-Württemberg	Pfeiffer, Joachim	CDU	district 264		
Baden-Württemberg	Bilger, Steffen	CDU	district 265		
Baden-Württemberg	Gienger, Eberhard	CDU	district 266		
Baden-Württemberg	Strobl, Thomas	CDU	district 267	list (no. 05)	
Baden-Württemberg	von Stetten, Christian	CDU	district 268		
Baden-Württemberg	Barthle, Norbert	CDU	district 269		
Baden-Württemberg	Kiesewetter, Roderich	CDU	district 270		
Baden-Württemberg	Wellenreuther, Ingo	CDU	district 271	list (no. 06)	
Baden-Württemberg	Fischer, Axel	CDU	district 272		
Baden-Württemberg	Götz, Peter	CDU	district 273		
Baden-Württemberg	Lamers, Karl A.	CDU	district 274	list (no. 10)	
Baden-Württemberg	Jüttner, Egon	CDU	district 275	list (no. 14)	
Baden-Württemberg	Gerig, Alois	CDU	district 276		
Baden-Württemberg	Harbarth, Stephan	CDU	district 277		
Baden-Württemberg	Gutting, Olav	CDU	district 278		
Baden-Württemberg	Krichbaum, Gunther	CDU	district 279		
Baden-Württemberg	Fuchtel, Hans-Joachim	CDU	district 280		
Baden-Württemberg	Schuster, Armin	CDU	district 282		
Baden-Württemberg	Weiß, Peter	CDU	district 283		
Baden-Württemberg	Schäuble, Wolfgang	CDU	district 284	list (no. 01)	
Baden-Württemberg	Kauder, Volker	CDU	district 285	list (no. 03)	
Baden-Württemberg	Kauder, Siegfried	CDU	district 286		
Baden-Württemberg	Jung, Andreas	CDU	district 287		
Baden-Württemberg	Dörflinger, Thomas	CDU	district 288		
Baden-Württemberg	Beck, Ernst-Reinhard	CDU	district 289		
Baden-Württemberg	Widmann-Mauz, Annette	CDU	district 290	list (no. 04)	
Baden-Württemberg	Schavan, Annette	CDU	district 291	list (no. 02)	
Baden-Württemberg	Rief, Josef	CDU	district 292		
Baden-Württemberg	Riebsamen, Lothar	CDU	district 293		
Baden-Württemberg	Schockenhoff, Andreas	CDU	district 294		
Baden-Württemberg	Bareiß, Thomas	CDU	district 295		
Baden-Württemberg	Erler, Gernot	SPD	district 281	list (no. 02)	
Baden-Württemberg	Vogt, Ute	SPD	district 258	list (no. 01)	
Baden-Württemberg	Kressl, Nicolette	SPD	district 273	list (no. 03)	resigned 1 June 2012
Baden-Württemberg	Lange, Christian	SPD	district 269	list (no. 04)	
Baden-Württemberg	Mattheis, Hildegard	SPD	district 291	list (no. 05)	
Baden-Württemberg	Roth, Karin	SPD	district 261	list (no. 06)	
Baden-Württemberg	Kumpf, Ute	SPD	district 259	list (no. 07)	
Baden-Württemberg	Scheer, Hermann	SPD	district 264	list (no. 08)	died 14 October 2010
Baden-Württemberg	Friedrich, Peter	SPD	district 287	list (no. 09)	resigned 21 May 2011
Baden-Württemberg	Arnold, Rainer	SPD	district 262	list (no. 10)	
Baden-Württemberg	Drobinski-Weiß, Elvira	SPD	district 284	list (no. 11)	
Baden-Württemberg	Gerster, Martin	SPD	district 292	list (no. 12)	
Baden-Württemberg	Mast, Katja	SPD	district 279	list (no. 13)	
Baden-Württemberg	Binding, Lothar	SPD	district 274	list (no. 14)	
Baden-Württemberg	Juratović, Josip	SPD	district 267	list (no. 15)	
Baden-Württemberg	Schwarzelühr-Sutter, Rita	SPD	district 288	list (no. 16)	since 28 October 2010
Baden-Württemberg	Rebmann, Stefan	SPD	district 275	list (no. 17)	since 23 May 2011
Baden-Württemberg	Sawade, Annette	SPD	district 268	list (no. 18)	since 1 June 2012
Baden-Württemberg	Homburger, Birgit	FDP	district 287	list (no. 01)	
Baden-Württemberg	Niebel, Dirk	FDP	district 274	list (no. 02)	
Baden-Württemberg	Burgbacher, Ernst	FDP	district 285	list (no. 03)	
Baden-Württemberg	Leibrecht, Harald	FDP	district 266	list (no. 04)	
Baden-Württemberg	Wolff, Harald	FDP	district 264	list (no. 05)	
Baden-Württemberg	Laurischk, Sibylle	FDP	district 284	list (no. 06)	
Baden-Württemberg	Meinhardt, Patrick	FDP	district 272	list (no. 07)	
Baden-Württemberg	Toncar, Florian	FDP	district 260	list (no. 08)	
Baden-Württemberg	Link, Michael	FDP	district 267	list (no. 09)	
Baden-Württemberg	Schweickert, Erik	FDP	district 279	list (no. 10)	
Baden-Württemberg	Reinemund, Birgit	FDP	district 275	list (no. 11)	
Baden-Württemberg	Skudelny, Judith	FDP	district 262	list (no. 12)	
Baden-Württemberg	Kober, Pascal	FDP	district 289	list (no. 13)	
Baden-Württemberg	Simmling, Werner	FDP	district 263	list (no. 14)	
Baden-Württemberg	Golombeck, Heinz	FDP	district 271	list (no. 15)	
Baden-Württemberg	Maurer, Ulrich	Linke	district 259	list (no. 01)	
Baden-Württemberg	Hänsel, Heike	Linke	district 290	list (no. 02)	
Baden-Württemberg	Binder, Karin	Linke	district 271	list (no. 03)	
Baden-Württemberg	Schlecht, Michael	Linke	district 275	list (no. 04)	
Baden-Württemberg	Groth, Annette	Linke	district 279	list (no. 05)	
Baden-Württemberg	Pitterle, Richard	Linke	district 260	list (no. 06)	
Baden-Württemberg	Andreae, Kerstin	Grüne	district 281	list (no. 01)	
Baden-Württemberg	Kuhn, Fritz	Grüne	district 274	list (no. 02)	resigned 7 January 2013
Baden-Württemberg	Kotting-Uhl, Sylvia	Grüne	district 271	list (no. 03)	
Baden-Württemberg	Schick, Gerhard	Grüne	district 275	list (no. 04)	
Baden-Württemberg	Müller-Gemmeke, Beate	Grüne	district 289	list (no. 05)	
Baden-Württemberg	Hermann, Winfried	Grüne	district 290	list (no. 06)	resigned 27 May 2011
Baden-Württemberg	Bender, Birgitt	Grüne	district 259	list (no. 07)	
Baden-Württemberg	Bonde, Alexander	Grüne	district 283	list (no. 08)	resigned 24 May 2011
Baden-Württemberg	Hönlinger, Ingrid	Grüne	district 265	list (no. 09)	
Baden-Württemberg	Kilic, Memet	Grüne	district 279	list (no. 10)	
Baden-Württemberg	Malczak, Agnes	Grüne	district 294	list (no. 11)	
Baden-Württemberg	Ebner, Harald	Grüne	district 268	list (no. 12)	since 25 May 2011
Baden-Württemberg	Seiler, Till	Grüne	district 287	list (no. 16)	from 6 June 2011 to 3 December 2011
Baden-Württemberg	Schneider, Ulrich	Grüne	district 267	list (no. 18)	since 7 December 2011
Baden-Württemberg	Kieckbusch, Susanne	Grüne	district 295	list (no. 19)	since 14 January 2013
Saarland	Hübinger, Anette	CDU	district 296	list (no. 02)	
Saarland	Altmaier, Peter	CDU	district 297	list (no. 01)	
Saarland	Müller, Nadine	CDU	district 298	list (no. 03)	
Saarland	Funk, Alexander	CDU	district 299	list (no. 04)	
Saarland	Ferner, Elke	SPD	district 296	list (no. 01)	
Saarland	Schreiner, Ottmar	SPD	district 297	list (no. 02)	died 6 April 2013
Saarland	Klug, Astrid	SPD	district 299	list (no. 03)	since 15 April 2013
Saarland	Luksic, Oliver	FDP	district 298	list (no. 01)	
Saarland	Lafontaine, Oskar	Linke		list (no. 01)	resigned 1 February 2010
Saarland	Lutze, Thomas	Linke		list (no. 02)	
Saarland	Ploetz, Yvonne	Linke		list (no. 03)	since 1 February 2010
Saarland	Tressel, Markus	Grüne		list (no. 01)	

== Changes in membership ==
Outgoing Bundestag member	district / list	Date and reason of outgoing member leaving seat	Incoming Bundestag member	district / list	Date of incoming member taking seat	Seats
Lafontaine, Oskar	Saarland list no. 1	1 February 2010; Resigned for health reasons.	Ploetz, Yvonne	Saarland list no. 3	1 February 2010	622
Krogmann, Martina	Niedersachsen district 031 list no. 3	1 April 2010; Resigned to become a state secretary in Niedersachsen.	Kammer, Hans-Werner	Niedersachsen district 027 list no. 13	1 April 2010	622
Grotelüschen, Astrid	Niedersachsen district 029 list no. 21	27 April 2010; Resigned to become a state minister in Niedersachsen.	Klamt, Ewa	Niedersachsen district 046 list no. 15	29 April 2010	622
Thiele, Carl-Ludwig	Niedersachsen district 040 list no. 1	5 May 2010; Resigned to become a board member of the Bundesbank.	Ratjen-Damerau, Christiane	Niedersachsen district 028 list no. 10	5 May 2010	622
Königshaus, Hellmut	Berlin district 085 list no. 3	20 May 2010; Resigned to become Wehrbeauftragter (parliament ombudsman for the military).	Krestel, Holger	Berlin district 082 list no. 4	20 May 2010	622
Schwall-Düren, Angelica	Nordrhein-Westfalen district 128 list no. 2	15 July 2010; Resigned to become a state minister in Nordrhein-Westfalen.	Griese, Kerstin	Nordrhein-Westfalen district 106 list no. 14	23 July 2010	622
Puttrich, Lucia	Hessen district 177 list no. 14	3 September 2010; Resigned to become a state minister in Hessen.	Siebert, Bernd	Hessen district 171 list no. 04	6 September 2010	622
Scheer, Hermann	Baden-Württemberg district 264 list no. 8	14 October 2010; Died.	Schwarzelühr-Sutter, Rita	Baden-Württemberg district 288 list no. 16	28 October 2010	622
Schui, Herbert	Niedersachsen district 37 list no. 4	1 November 2010; Resigned for age reasons.	Voß, Johanna	Niedersachsen district 38 list no. 7	1 November 2010	622
Dautzenberg, Leo	Nordrhein-Westfalen district 090 list no. 54	1 February 2011; Resigned to become a lobbyist.	Caesar, Cajus	Nordrhein-Westfalen district 136 list no. 20	1 February 2011	622
Haibach, Holger	Hessen district 176 list no. 17	1 March 2011; Resigned to become a regional director of the Konrad-Adenauer-Stiftung.	Heiderich, Helmut	Hessen district 170 list no. 15	9 March 2011	622
zu Guttenberg, Karl-Theodor	Bayern district 240 list no. 03	3 March 2011; Resigned after a plagiarism row.	none: overhung seat			621
Scholz, Olaf	Hamburg district 020 list no. 1	11 March 2011; Resigned after becoming First Mayor of Hamburg.	Egloff, Ingo	Hamburg district 023 list no. 4	11 March 2011	621
Friedrich, Peter	Baden-Württemberg district 287 list no. 9	21 May 2011; Resigned after becoming a state minister in Baden-Württemberg.	Rebmann, Stefan	Baden-Württemberg district 275 list no. 17	23 May 2011	621
Bonde, Alexander	Baden-Württemberg district 283 list no. 8	24 May 2011; Resigned after becoming a state minister in Baden-Württemberg.	Ebner, Harald	Baden-Württemberg district 268 list no. 12	25 May 2011	621
Hermann, Winfried	Baden-Württemberg district 290 list no. 6	27 May 2011; Resigned after becoming a state minister in Baden-Württemberg.	Seiler, Till	Baden-Württemberg district 287 list no. 16	6 June 2011	621
Klöckner, Julia	Rheinland-Pfalz district 202 list no. 06	27 May 2011; Resigned after becoming leader of the opposition in the Rheinland-Pfalz landtag.	none: overhung seat			620
Höfken, Ulrike	Rheinland-Pfalz district 203 list no. 1	9 June 2011; Resigned after becoming a state minister in Rheinland-Pfalz.	Lindner, Tobias	Rheinland-Pfalz district 212 list no. 6	9 June 2011	620
Seiler, Till	Baden-Württemberg district 287 list no. 16	3 December 2011; Resigned because he did not want to become a professional politician.	Schneider, Ulrich	Baden-Württemberg district 267 list no. 18	7 December 2011	620
Hoyer, Werner	Nordrhein-Westfalen district 095 list no. 4	1 January 2012; Resigned to become President of the European Investment Bank.	von Polheim, Jörg	Nordrhein-Westfalen district 100 list no. 21	4 January 2012	620
Scheel, Christine	Bayern district 247 list no. 3	16 January 2012; Resigned to become a member of the board of HEAG Südhessische Energie.	Walter-Rosenheimer, Beate	Bayern district 216 list no. 11	16 January 2012	620
Friedhoff, Paul	Nordrhein-Westfalen district 113 list no. 12	1 May 2012; Resigned for health reasons.	Todtenhausen, Manfred	Nordrhein-Westfalen district 103 list no. 22	2 May 2012	620
Kressl, Nicolette	Baden-Württemberg district 273 list no. 3	1 June 2012; Resigned after becoming Regierungspräsidentin of Karlsruhe Regierungsbezirk.	Sawade, Annette	Baden-Württemberg district 268 list no. 18	1 June 2012	620
Nestle, Ingrid	Schleswig-Holstein district 001 list no. 1	14 June 2012; Resigned to become a Staatssekretärin in the government of Schleswig-Holstein.	Wagner, Arfst	Schleswig-Holstein list no. 4	18 June 2012	620
Groschek, Michael	Nordrhein-Westfalen district 118 list no. 65	21 June 2012; Resigned after becoming a state minister in Nordrhein-Westfalen.	Hellmich, Wolfgang	Nordrhein-Westfalen district 147 list no. 15	22 June 2012	620
Duin, Garrelt	Niedersachsen district 025 list no. 1	21 June 2012; Resigned after becoming a state minister in Nordrhein-Westfalen.	Groneberg, Gabriele	Niedersachsen district 033 list no. 14	26 June 2012	620
Lindner, Christian	Nordrhein-Westfalen district 101 list no. 9	10 July 2012; Resigned after becoming FDP caucus chairman in Nordrhein-Westfalen's Landtag.	Ehrenberg, Hans-Werner	Nordrhein-Westfalen district 148 list no. 23	10 July 2012	620
Herrmann, Jürgen	Nordrhein-Westfalen district 137	11 August 2012; Died.	Hüppe, Hubert	Nordrhein-Westfalen district 145 list no. 22	16 August 2012	620
Kuhn, Fritz	Baden-Württemberg district 274 list no. 2	7 January 2013; Resigned to become Lord Mayor of Stuttgart.	Kieckbusch, Susanne	Baden-Württemberg district 295 list no. 19	14 January 2013	620
Ahrendt, Christian	Mecklenburg-Vorpommern district 013 list no. 1	8 January 2013; Resigned after becoming vice president of the Federal Audit Office.	Reinhold, Hagen	Mecklenburg-Vorpommern district 014 list no. 2	11 January 2013	620
Schreiner, Ottmar	Saarland district 297 list no. 2	6 April 2013; Died.	Klug Astrid	Saarland district 299 list no. 3	15 April 2013	620
Stadler, Max	Bayern district 229 list no. 2	12 May 2013; Died.	Drexler, Gerhard	Bayern district 227 list no. 15	15 May 2013	620

== See also ==
- Politics of Germany
- List of Bundestag Members
