= Leipzig I =

Federal electoral district of Germany

151 Leipzig I
- Electoral district for the Bundestag
- Leipzig I in 2025
- State: Saxony
- Population: 293,100 (2019)
- Electorate: 224,100 (2021)
- Major settlements: Leipzig (partial)
- Area: 169.8 km^{2}

Current electoral district
- Created: 1990
- Party: AfD
- Member: Vacant
- Elected: 2025

Leipzig I is an electoral constituency (German: Wahlkreis) represented in the Bundestag. It elects one member via first-past-the-post voting. Under the current constituency numbering system, it is designated as constituency 151. It is located in northwestern Saxony, comprising the northern part of the city of Leipzig.

Leipzig I was created for the inaugural 1990 federal election after German reunification. From 2017 to 2025, it has been represented by Jens Lehmann of the Christian Democratic Union (CDU). Since 2025 it has been represented by Christian Kriegel of the AfD, but the constituency still is vacant.

== Geography ==
Leipzig I is located in northwestern Saxony. As of the 2021 federal election, it comprises the city districts (Stadtbezirke) of Alt-West, Nord, Nordost, Nordwest, and Ost from the independent city of Leipzig.

== History ==
Leipzig I was created after German reunification in 1990. In the 1990 through 1998 elections, it was constituency 309 in the numbering system. From 2002 through 2009, it was number 153. In the 2013 through 2021 elections, it was number 152. From the 2025 election, it has been number 151.

Originally, the constituency comprised the Stadtbezirke of Mitte, Nord, Nord-Ost, and West from the independent city of Leipzig. It acquired its current borders in the 2002 election.

Election	No.	Name	Borders
1990	309	Leipzig I	Leipzig city (only Mitte, Nord, Nord-Ost, and West Stadtbezirke)
1994	309	Leipzig I	Leipzig city (only Mitte, Nord, Nord-Ost, and West Stadtbezirke)
1998	309	Leipzig I	Leipzig city (only Mitte, Nord, Nord-Ost, and West Stadtbezirke)
2002	153	Leipzig I	Leipzig city (only Alt-West, Nord, Nordost, Nordwest, and Ost Stadtbezirke)
2005	153	Leipzig I	Leipzig city (only Alt-West, Nord, Nordost, Nordwest, and Ost Stadtbezirke)
2009	153	Leipzig I	Leipzig city (only Alt-West, Nord, Nordost, Nordwest, and Ost Stadtbezirke)
2013	152	Leipzig I	Leipzig city (only Alt-West, Nord, Nordost, Nordwest, and Ost Stadtbezirke)
2017	152	Leipzig I	Leipzig city (only Alt-West, Nord, Nordost, Nordwest, and Ost Stadtbezirke)
2021	152	Leipzig I	Leipzig city (only Alt-West, Nord, Nordost, Nordwest, and Ost Stadtbezirke)
2025	151	Leipzig I	Leipzig city (only Alt-West, Nord, Nordost, Nordwest, and Ost Stadtbezirke)

== Members ==
The constituency was first represented by Hermann Pohler of the Christian Democratic Union (CDU) from 1990 to 1998. It was won by Rainer Fornahl of the Social Democratic Party (SPD) in 1998 and served until 2009, when it was won Bettina Kudla of the CDU. Jens Lehmann of the CDU was elected in 2017 and re-elected in 2021.

Election	Member	Party	%
1990	Hermann Pohler	CDU	39.1
1994	Hermann Pohler	CDU	43.4
1998	Rainer Fornahl	SPD	38.7
2002	Rainer Fornahl	SPD	40.7
2005	Rainer Fornahl	SPD	33.0
2009	Bettina Kudla	CDU	33.3
2013	Bettina Kudla	CDU	40.0
2017	Jens Lehmann	CDU	27.5
2021	Jens Lehmann	CDU	20.5
2025	Vacant (Note: Christian Kriegel (AfD) won with 25.0% but seat remained vacant due to insufficient second votes cover.)		

== Election results ==
=== 2025 election ===
Federal election (2025): Leipzig I
Notes:	Blue background denotes the winner of the electorate vote. Pink background denotes a candidate elected from their party list. Yellow background denotes an electorate win by a list member, or other incumbent. A ✓ or ✗ denotes status of any incumbent, win or lose respectively.						
Party	Candidate	Votes	%	±%	Party votes	%	±%
AfD	Christian Kriegel	45,728	25.0	▲9.1	46,287	25.3	▲9.7
Left	Nina Treu	39,376	21.5	▲6.2	38,513	21.0	▲8.5
CDU	✗ Jens Lehmann	39,285	21.5	▲0.9	31,902	17.4	▲2.4
Greens	Stanslav Elinson	13,796	7.5	▼4.4	19,746	10.8	▼4.7
SPD	Holger Mann	21,470	11.7	▼8.5	18,454	10.1	▼10.8
BSW	Sascha Jecht	11,726	6.4	New	14,205	7.8	New
FDP	Alexander Gunkel	3,828	2.1	▼6.0	5,826	3.2	▼7.4
Tierschutzpartei					2,429	1.3	▼1.0
FW	Thomas Weidinger	2,185	1.2	▼0.8	1,675	0.9	▼0.7
Volt	Jan Meyer	1,808	1.0	New	1,550	0.8	▲0.5
PARTEI	Katharina Subat	2,279	1.2	▼1.3	1,416	0.8	▼1.0
Independent	Gunnar Busse	490	0.3	New			
Pirates					340	0.2	▼0.3
Independent	Martin Mauer	310	0.2	New			
BD	Hubert Lehnigk	382	0.2	New	309	0.2	New
Humanists					200	0.1	▼0.1
MLPD	Jörg Weidemann	290	0.2	0.0	141	0.1	0.0
Informal votes		979			939		
Total valid votes		182,953			182,993		
Turnout		183,932	81.7	▲6.9			
AfD gain from CDU	Majority	6,352	3.5	N/A			

=== 2021 election ===
Federal election (2021): Leipzig I
Notes:	Blue background denotes the winner of the electorate vote. Pink background denotes a candidate elected from their party list. Yellow background denotes an electorate win by a list member, or other incumbent. A ✓ or ✗ denotes status of any incumbent, win or lose respectively.						
Party	Candidate	Votes	%	±%	Party votes	%	±%
CDU	✓ Jens Lehmann	34,107	20.5	▼7.0	24,953	15.0	▼8.5
SPD	Holger Mann	33,588	20.2	▲3.7	34,748	20.9	▲8.0
AfD	Christoph Neumann	26,450	15.9	▼4.5	25,891	15.6	▼5.3
Left	Nina Treu	25,436	15.3	▼4.2	20,884	12.6	▼6.9
Greens	Marie Müser	19,778	11.9	▲6.4	25,848	15.5	▲8.5
FDP	René Hobusch	13,397	8.1	▲2.4	17,660	10.6	▲2.1
Tierschutzpartei					3,800	2.3	▲0.5
PARTEI	Katharina Subat	4,242	2.6	▼0.1	3,021	1.8	▼0.2
FW	Thomas Weidinger	3,296	2.0	▲0.8	2,645	1.6	▲0.7
dieBasis	Kerry Cherki	2,275	1.4		2,204	1.3	
Independent	Ronald Härtlein	1,014	0.6				
Pirates					833	0.5	0.0
Gesundheitsforschung					693	0.4	
Volt					660	0.4	
Team Todenhöfer					656	0.4	
Humanists	Kristina Weidner	896	0.5		427	0.3	
Independent	Ralf Kohl	623	0.4				
ÖDP	Rahel Wehemeyer-Blum	497	0.3		306	0.2	0.0
NPD					303	0.2	▼0.5
V-Partei3					242	0.1	▼0.1
The III. Path					183	0.1	
Bündnis C					160	0.1	
MLPD	Gudrun Kimmerle	283	0.2		153	0.1	▼0.1
Independent	Karl-Heinz Hummitzsch	193	0.1				
DKP					149	0.1	
Independent	Martin Bayer	52	0.0				
Informal votes		1,569			1,277		
Total valid votes		166,127			166,419		
Turnout		167,696	74.8	▲1.7			
CDU hold	Majority	519	0.3	▼6.7			

=== 2017 election ===
Federal election (2017): Leipzig I
Notes:	Blue background denotes the winner of the electorate vote. Pink background denotes a candidate elected from their party list. Yellow background denotes an electorate win by a list member, or other incumbent. A ✓ or ✗ denotes status of any incumbent, win or lose respectively.						
Party	Candidate	Votes	%	±%	Party votes	%	±%
CDU	Jens Lehmann	43,919	27.5	▼12.5	37,622	23.5	▼13.4
AfD	Christoph Neumann	32,702	20.5		33,291	20.8	▲14.7
Left	Franziska Riekewald	31,132	19.5	▼3.9	31,137	19.5	▼1.8
SPD	Daniela Kolbe	26,330	16.5	▼5.2	20,674	12.9	▼5.6
FDP	Marcus Viefeld	9,074	5.7	▲4.0	13,565	8.5	▲5.5
Greens	Volker Holzendorf	8,735	5.5	▼0.2	11,300	7.1	▲0.1
PARTEI	Tom Rodig	4,173	2.6		3,205	2.0	
Tierschutzpartei					2,877	1.8	
FW	Robert Baier	1,876	1.2		1,443	0.9	▼0.1
NPD					1,169	0.7	▼1.6
Independent	Ralf Detlef Kohl	956	0.6				
BGE					876	0.5	
Pirates					850	0.5	▼2.7
DiB					770	0.5	
V-Partei³					333	0.2	
ÖDP					330	0.2	
MLPD					247	0.2	0.0
BüSo	Madeleine Fellauer	550	0.3	▼1.0	241	0.2	▼0.1
SGP	Endrik Bastian	334	0.2				
Informal votes		1,626			1,477		
Total valid votes		159,781			159,930		
Turnout		161,407	73.1	▲7.4			
CDU hold	Majority	11,217	7.0	▼9.6			

=== 2013 election ===
Federal election (2013): Leipzig I
Notes:	Blue background denotes the winner of the electorate vote. Pink background denotes a candidate elected from their party list. Yellow background denotes an electorate win by a list member, or other incumbent. A ✓ or ✗ denotes status of any incumbent, win or lose respectively.						
Party	Candidate	Votes	%	±%	Party votes	%	±%
CDU	✓ Bettina Kudla	54,566	40.0	▲6.7	50,481	36.9	▲6.9
Left	Barbara Höll	31,923	23.4	▼3.1	29,122	21.3	▼4.2
SPD	Daniela Kolbe	29,511	21.6	▲2.2	25,286	18.5	▲0.5
Greens	Stefanie Gruner	7,683	5.6	▼1.3	9,466	6.9	▼2.0
AfD					8,394	6.1	
NPD	Klaus Ufer	4,489	3.3	0.0	3,246	2.4	▼0.9
Pirates	Florian Bokor	4,043	3.0		4,362	3.2	
FDP	Marcus Viefeld	2,307	1.7	▼7.5	4,028	2.9	▼9.9
FW					1,309	1.0	
PRO					489	0.4	
BüSo	Andreas Trost	1,877	1.4	▲0.1	408	0.3	▼0.6
MLPD					203	0.1	▼0.1
Informal votes		2,028			1,633		
Total valid votes		136,399			136,794		
Turnout		138,427	65.8	▲1.6			
CDU hold	Majority	22,643	16.6	▲9.9			

=== 2009 election ===
Federal election (2009): Leipzig I
Notes:	Blue background denotes the winner of the electorate vote. Pink background denotes a candidate elected from their party list. Yellow background denotes an electorate win by a list member, or other incumbent. A ✓ or ✗ denotes status of any incumbent, win or lose respectively.						
Party	Candidate	Votes	%	±%	Party votes	%	±%
CDU	Bettina Kudla	42,704	33.3	▲4.0	38,471	30.0	▲4.2
Left	Barbara Höll	34,015	26.6	▲2.7	32,762	25.5	▲3.0
SPD	Daniela Kolbe	24,866	19.4	▼13.6	23,070	18.0	▼14.0
FDP	Marcus Viefeld	11,781	9.2	▲4.0	16,478	12.8	▲4.8
Greens	Friedbert Striewe	8,856	6.9	▲3.0	11,474	8.9	▲2.4
NPD	Jens Pühse	4,202	3.3	▲0.3	4,225	3.3	▲0.3
BüSo	Xenia Biereichelt	1,691	1.3	▲0.7	1,197	0.9	▲0.4
REP					340	0.3	0.0
MLPD					294	0.2	▲0.1
Informal votes		1,719			1,523		
Total valid votes		128,115			128,311		
Turnout		129,834	64.1	▼9.6			
CDU gain from SPD	Majority	8,689	6.7				

=== 2005 election ===
Federal election (2005):Leipzig I
Notes:	Blue background denotes the winner of the electorate vote. Pink background denotes a candidate elected from their party list. Yellow background denotes an electorate win by a list member, or other incumbent. A ✓ or ✗ denotes status of any incumbent, win or lose respectively.						
Party	Candidate	Votes	%	±%	Party votes	%	±%
SPD	✓ Rainer Fornahl	47,265	33.0	▼7.7	45,850	32.0	▼7.8
CDU	Jens Lehmann	42,028	29.3	▲1.4	37,002	25.8	▲0.6
Left	Barbara Höll	34,219	23.9	▲3.9	32,298	22.5	▲5.0
FDP	Peter Gutjahr-Löser	7,500	5.2	▼0.8	11,601	8.1	▲1.1
Greens	Katharina Krefft	5,658	3.9	▼0.8	9,433	6.6	▲0.1
NPD	Jürgen Schön	4,294	3.0		4,234	3.0	▲2.1
Independent	Jürgen Kunath	1,145	0.8				
Alliance for Health, Peace and Social Justice					917	0.6	
BüSo	Helga Zepp-LaRouche	880	0.6		760	0.5	▲0.3
DSU	Jörg Krause	379	0.3	▼0.4			
SGP					387	0.3	
REP					376	0.3	▼0.2
PBC					357	0.2	0.0
MLPD					176	0.1	
Informal votes		1,924			1,901		
Total valid votes		143,368			143,391		
Turnout		145,292	73.7	▲0.7			
SPD hold	Majority	5,237	9.1				
