= Raju Sharma =

German politician (born 1964)

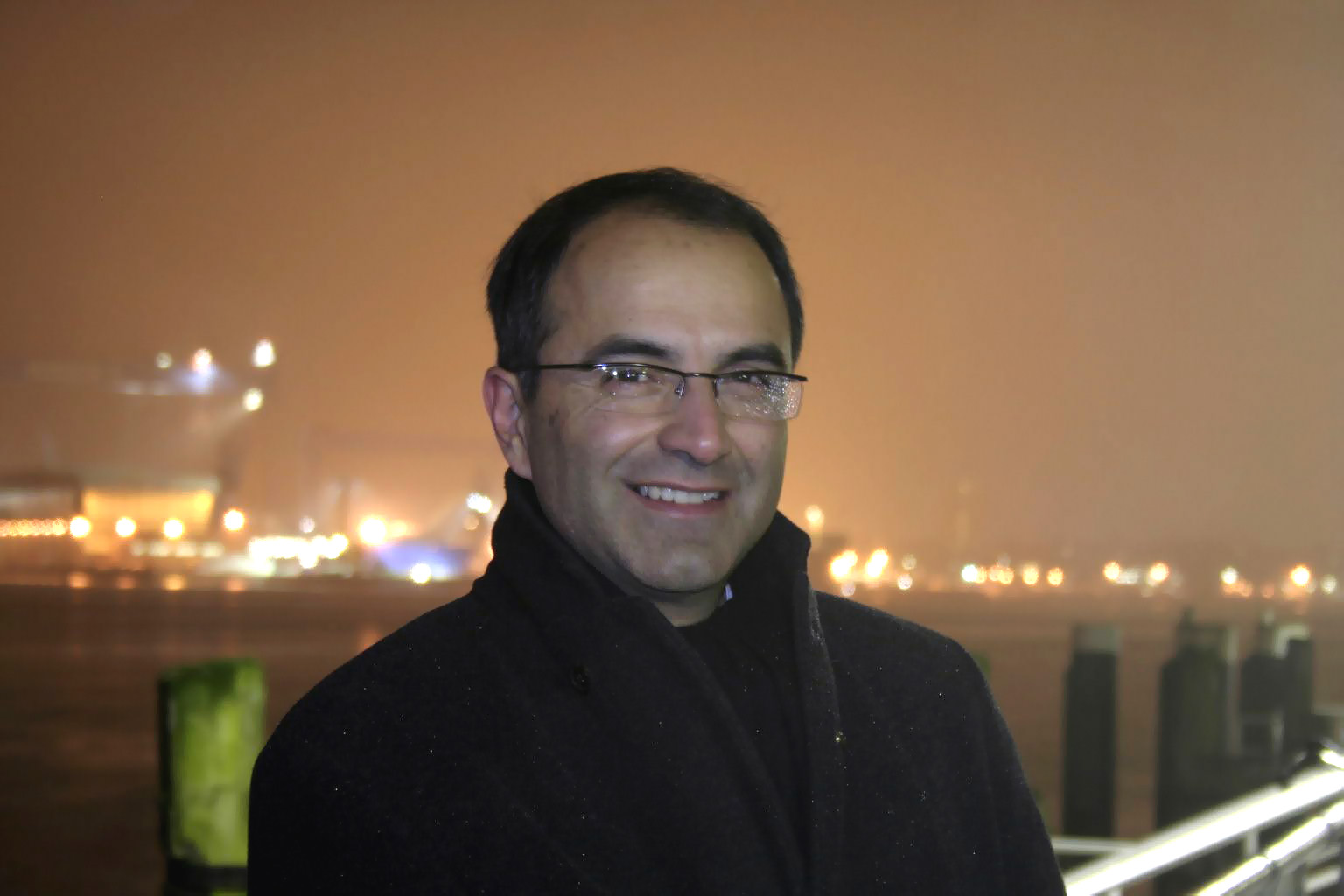
Sharma in 2008

Raju Sharma (born 28 July 1964) is a German politician of the Left party who was a member of the seventeenth Bundestag.

== Biography ==
Sharma was born on 28 July 1964 in Hamburg to a father of Indian (Hindu) origin and a German mother. Both his parents died early in his life. After his Abitur in 1983, he received legal training in Hamburg and Bombay and practiced law. He started being politically active in the 1970s and 1980s, promoting the Peace movement as a member of the SDAJ (Socialist German Workers Youth), the German Communist Party and its student society, the Marxistischer Studentenbund Spartakus before joining the Social Democratic Party in 1992. He stayed there until he joined the Labour and Social Justice – The Electoral Alternative in 2005 because he disagreed with German involvement in other wars. That party later merged into The Left. In 2009, he became his party's spokesman on religious policy after being elected into the Bundestag.

In an interview in 2012, he empathised that the Left "does not hate churches", referring to the controversial question of state atheism in communist states and him engaging with politics (leaning) in that direction.

He is married and has a daughter and a son.
