= Holger Mann =

German politician (born 1979)

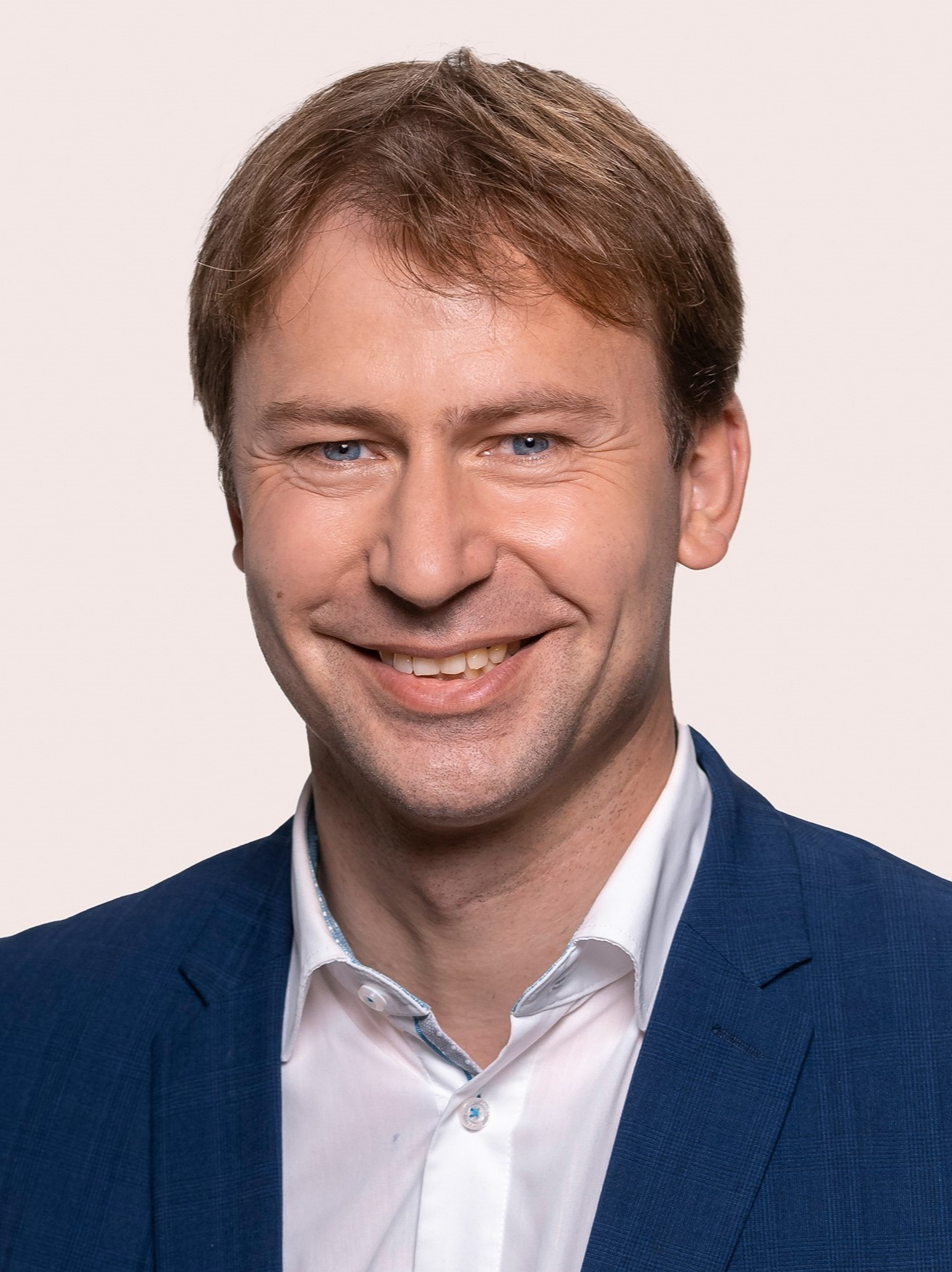
- Holger Mann, 2021

Member of the Bundestag
- Incumbent
- Assumed office 2021

Personal details
- Born: 19 February 1979 (age 47) Dresden, East Germany (now Germany)
- Party: SPD

Holger Mann (born 19 February 1979) is a German politician of the Social Democratic Party (SPD) who has been serving as a member of the Bundestag since 2021.

== Early life and education ==
Mann was born 1979 in the East German city of Dresden and studied history. He moved to Leipzig in 1997.

== Political career ==
=== Career in state politics ===
Mann was member of the State Parliament of Saxony from 2009 to 2021.

=== Member of the German Parliament, 2021–present ===
In the 2021 elections, Mann was elected directly to the Bundestag, representing the Leipzig I district. In parliament, he has since been serving on the Committee on Education, Research and Technology Assessment.

Within his parliamentary group, Mann belongs to the Parliamentary Left, a left-wing movement.

In the negotiations to form a Grand Coalition under the leadership of Friedrich Merz's Christian Democrats (CDU together with the Bavarian CSU) and the SPD following the 2025 German elections, Mann was part of the SPD delegation in the working group on education, research and innovation, led by Karin Prien, Katrin Staffler and Oliver Kaczmarek.

== Other activities ==
- Federal Agency for Disruptive Innovation (SPRIN-D), Member of the Supervisory Board (since 2022)
- Stiftung Forum Recht, Member of the Board of Trustees (since 2022)
- German United Services Trade Union (ver.di), Member
