= Rita Schwarzelühr-Sutter =

German politician

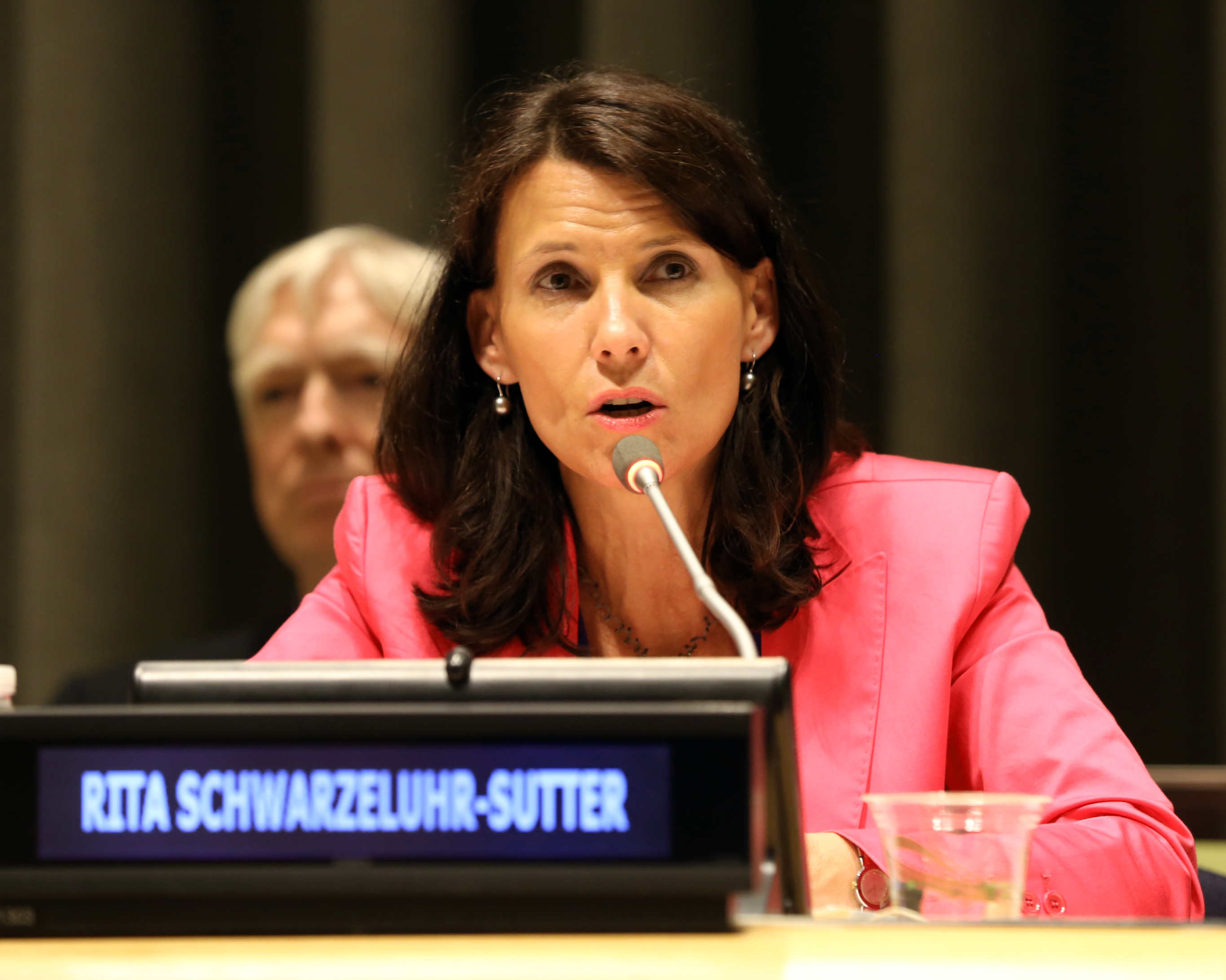
- Schwarzelühr-Sutter at United Nations (2016)

Parliamentary State Secretary at the Federal Ministry for the Environment, Climate Action, Nature Conservation and Nuclear Safety
- Incumbent
- Assumed office 7 May 2025
- Chancellor: Friedrich Merz
- Minister: Carsten Schneider

Parliamentary State Secretary for Interior and Community
- In office 8 December 2021 – 25 March 2025
- Chancellor: Olaf Scholz
- Minister: Nancy Faeser

Parliamentary State Secretary for Environment, Nature Conservation, Building and Nuclear Safety
- In office 17 December 2013 – 8 December 2021
- Chancellor: Angela Merkel
- Minister: Barbara Hendricks and Svenja Schulze

Member of the Bundestag
- Incumbent
- Assumed office 2005

Personal details
- Born: 13 October 1962 (age 64) Waldshut
- Party: Social Democratic Party
- Children: 2
- Education: University of Freiburg; ETH Zurich
- Website: www.schwarzelühr-sutter.de

Rita Schwarzelühr-Sutter (born 13 October 1962) is a German politician of the Social Democratic Party (SPD) who serves as a member of the German Bundestag, the German federal parliament. She is currently the Parliamentary State Secretary at the Federal Ministry for the Environment, Climate Action, Nature Conservation and Nuclear Safety.

In addition to her parliamentary work, Schwarzelühr-Sutter has been serving as Parliamentary State Secretary in the cabinets of successive Chancellors Angela Merkel (2013–2021), Olaf Scholz (2021–2025) and Friedrich Merz (since 2025).

== Early life and education ==
Schwarzelühr-Sutter was born on 13 October 1962 in Waldshut in Baden-Württemberg. She studied Business Administration at the University of Freiburg and ETH Zurich, graduating in 1989.

== Political career ==
=== Career in state politics ===
Rita Schwarzelühr-Sutter joined the Social Democratic Party (SPD) in 1994 and has been a member of the executive board of the SPD party organization for Waldshut since 1995. Since 2001 she has been the chairwoman of the SPD constituency party for the district of Waldshut. She was a member of the municipal council of her home town of Lauchringen from 1999 to the end of 2013. Since 2004 she has also been a member of the district council of the rural district of Waldshut.

Since September 2007 she has been a member of the SPD executive board in the state of Baden-Württemberg, and from 2008 to 2009 she headed the national SPD Executive Committee's working group on sustainable mobility.

From 1997 to 2005 Schwarzelühr-Sutter worked as an advisor and communications coordinator/strategist for Karin Rehbock-Zureich, a member of the Bundestag, the German federal parliament.

=== Member of Parliament, 2005–present ===
In the German federal election of 2005, Schwarzelühr-Sutter was elected to the Bundestag as a party list candidate. In parliament, she has since served on the Committee on Transport (2005–2009), the Committee on Food, Agriculture and Consumer Protection (2010–2012), and the Committee on Economic Affairs and Technology (2012–2013).

By 2007, Schwarzelühr-Sutter was reportedly being groomed by the SPD as a future leader. In the 2009 federal elections, she was placed at number 16 on the party list and narrowly missed re-election to the Bundestag but was automatically re-elected in 2010 as designated successor following the death of Hermann Scheer.

Schwarzelühr-Sutter was re-elected in the 2013 federal election. In the negotiations to form a Grand Coalition of the Chancellor Angela Merkel's Christian Democrats (CDU together with the Bavarian CSU) and the SPD following the elections, she was part of the SPD delegation in the working group on economic policy, led by Ilse Aigner and Hubertus Heil.

On 17 December 2013, Schwarzelühr-Sutter was appointed Parliamentary State Secretary at the Federal Ministry for the Environment, Nature Conservation, Building and Nuclear Safety in Merkel's third cabinet. In this capacity, she has represented successive ministers Barbara Hendricks (2013–2018) and Svenja Schulze (since 2018) in political and parliamentary affairs, particularly in her designated special areas of climate change mitigation, nuclear reactor safety, conservation, and the environment and health. (Note: Directorate-General KI, RS, N, and IG of the ministry.) She has led or been a member of German delegations on various topics, including the Small Islands Development Conference for Small Island Developing States (SIDS 2014), the conference of the treaty states of the Biodiversity Convention (UN-CBD COP-12), and negotiations on the 2030 Agenda for Sustainable Development. She represents Germany at the High-Level Political Forum for Sustainable Development (HLPF) held annually at the United Nations in New York City.

In addition, Schwarzelühr-Sutter served as deputy chairwoman of the German-Swiss Parliamentary Friendship Group from 2011 until 2017.

In the negotiations to form a coalition government under Merkel’s leadership following the 2017 federal elections, Schwarzelühr-Sutter was part of the working group on energy, climate protection and the environment, led by Hendricks, Armin Laschet and Georg Nüßlein.

Following the 2021 state elections in Baden-Württemberg, Schwarzelühr-Sutter was part of her party's delegation in negotiations with Minister-President Winfried Kretschmann's Alliance '90/Greens on a potential coalition government.

== Other activities ==
=== Regulatory bodies ===
- Federal Network Agency for Electricity, Gas, Telecommunications, Posts and Railway (BNetzA), Member of the Rail Infrastructure Advisory Council (2005–2009)

=== Corporate boards ===
- KfW, Member of the SME Advisory Council (since 2014)

=== Non-profit organizations ===
- Federal Foundation for the Reappraisal of the SED Dictatorship, Member of the Board of Trustees (since 2022)
- Business Forum of the Social Democratic Party of Germany, Member of the Political Advisory Board (since 2018)
- German Federal Environmental Foundation (German: Deutsche Bundesstiftung Umwelt, BDU), Chairwoman of the Advisory Board (since 2014)
- Gesellschaft für Anlagen- und Reaktorsicherheit (GRS), Chairwoman of the Supervisory Board (since 2014)
- University of Freiburg, Member of the Advisory Board

== Political positions ==
In July 2015, following irregularities involving the reactor pressure vessel at the Beznau Nuclear Power Plant in Switzerland, near the German border, and near her parliamentary constituency, Schwarzelühr-Sutter demanded the final shutdown of the power plant, which is the oldest still operating nuclear power station in the world, having gone on line in 1964.

In January 2016, in response to an incident at the Leibstadt Nuclear Power Plant in Switzerland, near the German border, and near her parliamentary constituency, Schwarzelühr-Sutter criticized the operator's attitudes to safety.

== Personal life ==
Schwarzelühr-Sutter is married and has two children.

== See also ==
- Third Merkel cabinet
- List of Social Democratic Party of Germany members
- Federal Ministry for the Environment, Nature Conservation, Building and Nuclear Safety
- List of members of the 17th Bundestag
