= Christian Ahrendt =

German politician and member of the FDP (born 1963)

Christian Ahrendt (born 7 May 1963 in Lübeck) is a German lawyer and politician of the Free Democratic Party (FDP) who has been serving as Vice President of the Federal Court of Auditors since 2013.

== Political career ==
From 2005 to 2013, Ahrendt was a member of the German Bundestag. In parliament, he served on the Committee on Internal Affairs from 2005 until 2009. He was his parliamentary group's spokesperson on legal affairs.

In the negotiations to form a coalition government of the FDP and the Christian Democrats (CDU together with the Bavarian CSU) following the 2009 federal elections, Ahrendt was part of the FDP delegation in the working group on transport policy, led by Hans-Peter Friedrich and Patrick Döring.
