= Christoph Neumann =

German politician (born 1964)

Member of the Bundestag
- Incumbent
- Assumed office 24 October 2017

Personal details
- Born: 7 November 1964 (age 61)
- Party: AfD

Christoph Neumann (born 7 November 1964) is a German politician from the Alternative for Germany (Alternative für Deutschland, AfD) party. Neumann has been a member of the Bundestag since 2017.

== Life and politics ==
Neumann was born 1964 in the East German city of Leipzig and became a frontier soldier. Neumann entered the populist AfD in 2014 and became member of the Bundestag after the 2017 German federal election.
