= Daniela Kolbe =

German politician (born 1980)

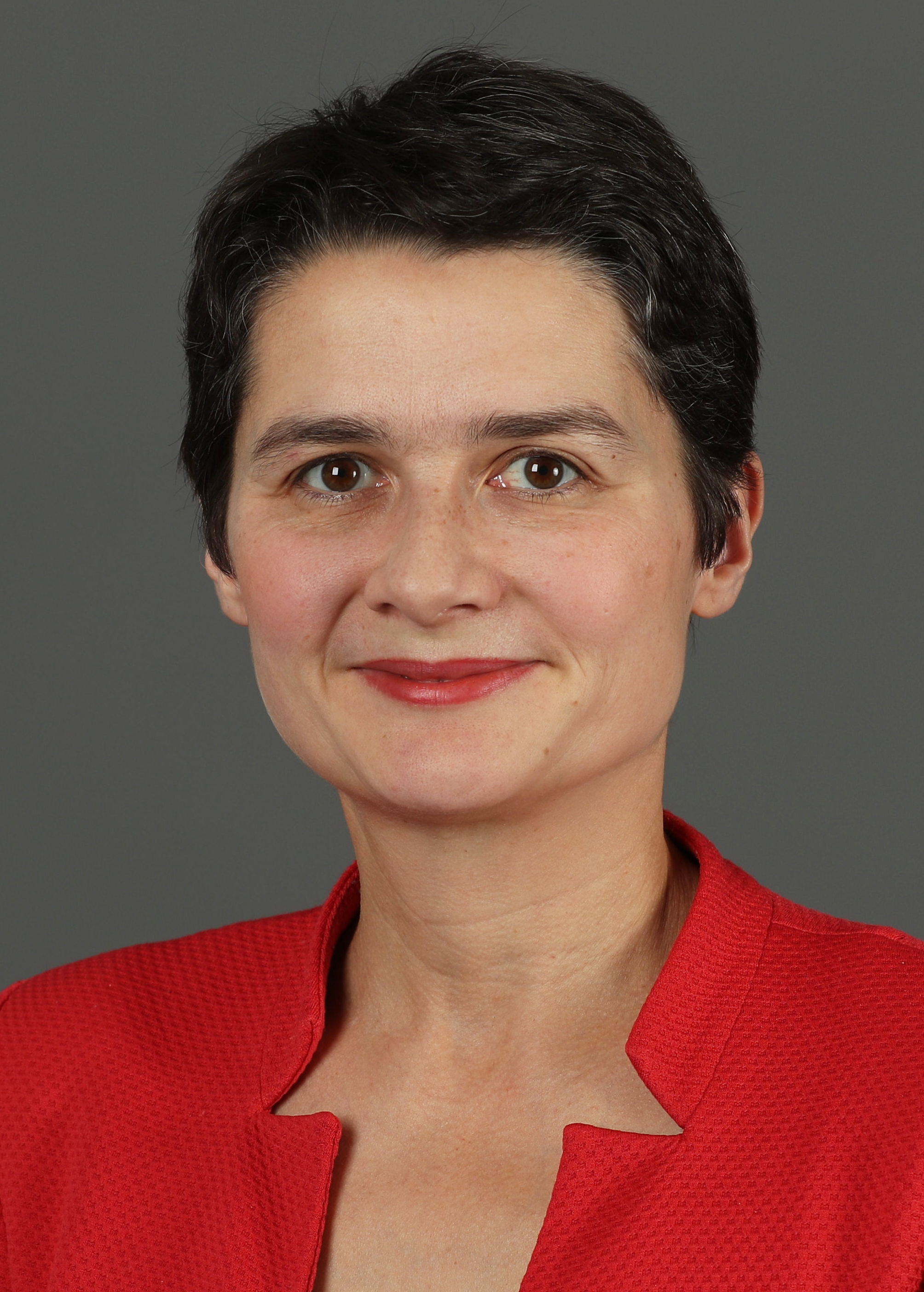
- Daniela Kolbe in 2020

Member of the Bundestag
- In office 2009–2021

Personal details
- Born: 22 February 1980 (age 46) Schleiz, East Germany (now Germany)
- Party: SPD
- Education: University of Leipzig

Daniela Kolbe (born 22 February 1980) is a German physicist and politician of the Social Democratic Party (SPD) who served as a member of the Bundestag from the state of Saxony from 2009 until 2021.

== Political career ==
Kolbe first became member of the Bundestag in the 2009 German federal election, representing the Leipzig I district. In parliament, she first served on the Committee on Internal Affairs from 2009 until 2013. From 2014 until 2021, she served on the Committee for Labour and Social Affairs. Within her parliamentary group, she chaired the caucus of MPs from Germany's Eastern states from 2013 until 2015. Since 2014, she has been part of the SPD's leadership in Saxony under chairman Martin Dulig.

In September 2019, Kolbe announced that she would not stand in the 2021 federal elections but instead resign from national politics by the end of the parliamentary term.
