= Michael Schlecht =

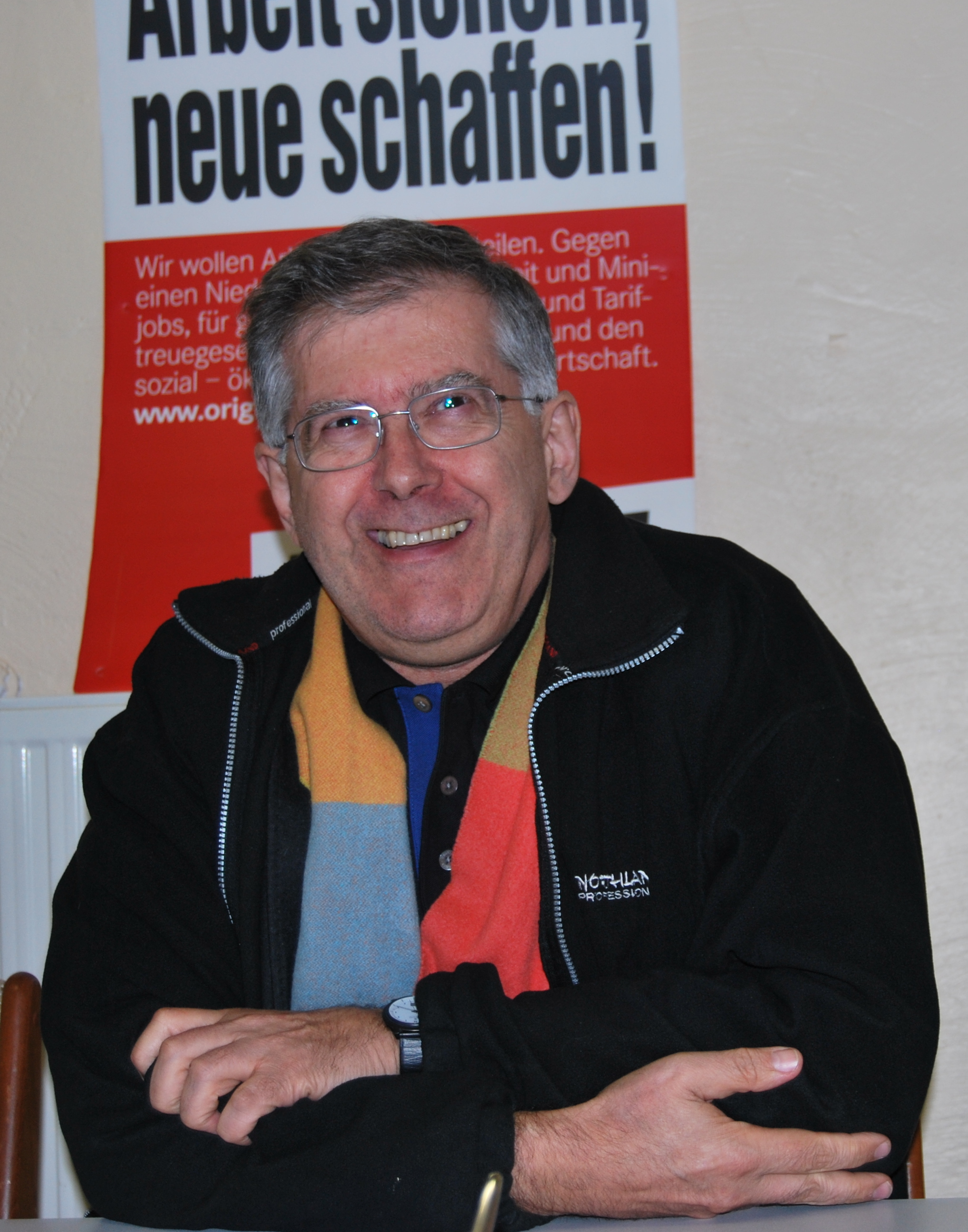
Schlecht in 2010 in Soest

Michael Schlecht (born 1951 in Hildesheim) is a German politician. From 2009 to 2017, he served as a member of the Bundestag for the Left Party.

== Life ==
Michael Schlecht was born on 25 June in Hildesheim, Lower Saxony and grew up in Hamburg. After graduating from secondary school (Mittleren Reife) in 1966, he trained as a printer and did Zivildienst. He moved to West Berlin in 1973, where he studied to become a printing engineer until 1980. He also studied economics at the Free University of Berlin and worked as a publisher. From 1980, he was employed by the IG Druck und Papier trade union in Stuttgart - IG Medien from 1989. In 2001, he became Chief Economist at ver.di in Berlin.

== Political work ==
From 1980 to 1982, Schlecht participated in an attempt to found a left-wing party to the left of the center-left Social Democratic Party (SPD) with the Democratic Socialists, but this failed. He then returned to the SPD in 1982, but left in 2005 in opposition to the "Agenda 2010" policy. Schlecht is known as an opponent of the Universal basic income and instead supports a "means-tested basic income". He then supported the WASG, that later merged with the East German Party of Democratic Socialism to create the Left Party in 2008. In the following years, he was elected into the latter party's executive board. In the Federal Elections of 2009 and 2013, he candidated for the electoral district of Mannheim, both times scoring fourth with 12.520 (9.5%) and 8.951 (6.6%) votes, respectively. Nevertheless, he was given a mandate through the State List.

In the Bundestag, he contributed to the Committee on Technology and Economy.

== Private life ==
Schlecht is married and has two children.
