= Paul Friedhoff =

German politician (1943–2015)

Paul K. Friedhoff
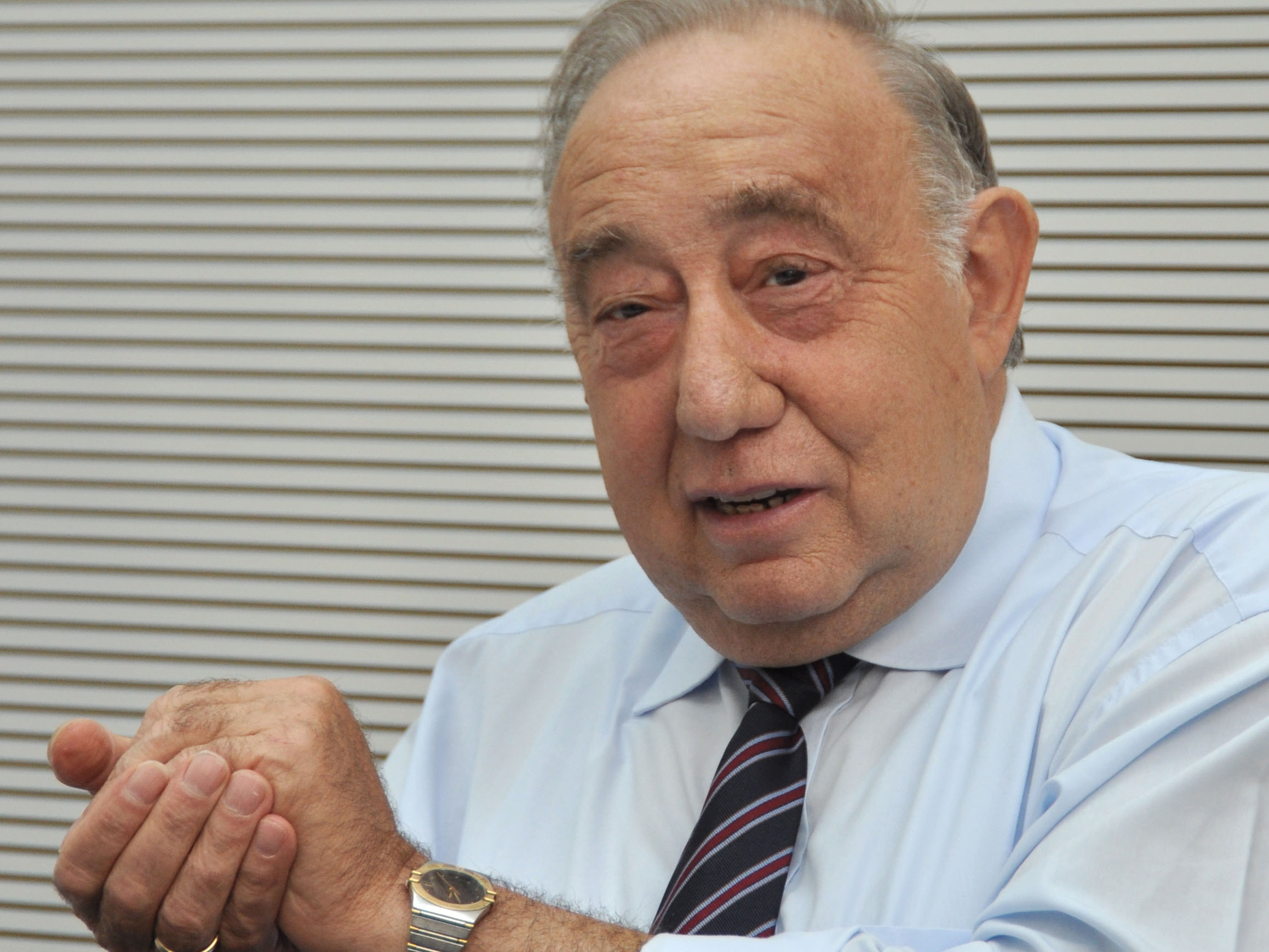

Member of the Bundestag
- In office 20 December 1990 – 17 October 2002
- In office 18 October 2005 – 30 April 2012

Personal details
- Born: 2 February 1943 Altenbunnen / Krs. Cloppenburg
- Died: 15 November 2015 (aged 72)
- Party: FDP

Paul K. Friedhoff (2 February 1943 – 15 November 2015) was a German politician of the Free Democratic Party (FDP) and former member of the German Bundestag.

== Life ==
Friedhoff became a member of the German Bundestag after the federal elections in 1990 and also moved back into the Bundestag after the federal elections in 1994 and 1998. From 2005 to 2012 he was again a member of the Bundestag. He was a member of the Bundestag's economic committee and there he was chairman of the FDP. On 30 April 2012, he resigned his mandate for health reasons.

== Literature ==
Herbst, Ludolf; Jahn, Bruno (2002). Vierhaus, Rudolf (ed.). Biographisches Handbuch der Mitglieder des Deutschen Bundestages. 1949–2002 [Biographical Handbook of the Members of the German Bundestag. 1949–2002] (in German). München: De Gruyter - De Gruyter Saur. p. 1715. ISBN 978-3-11-184511-1.
