= Annette Sawade =

German politician

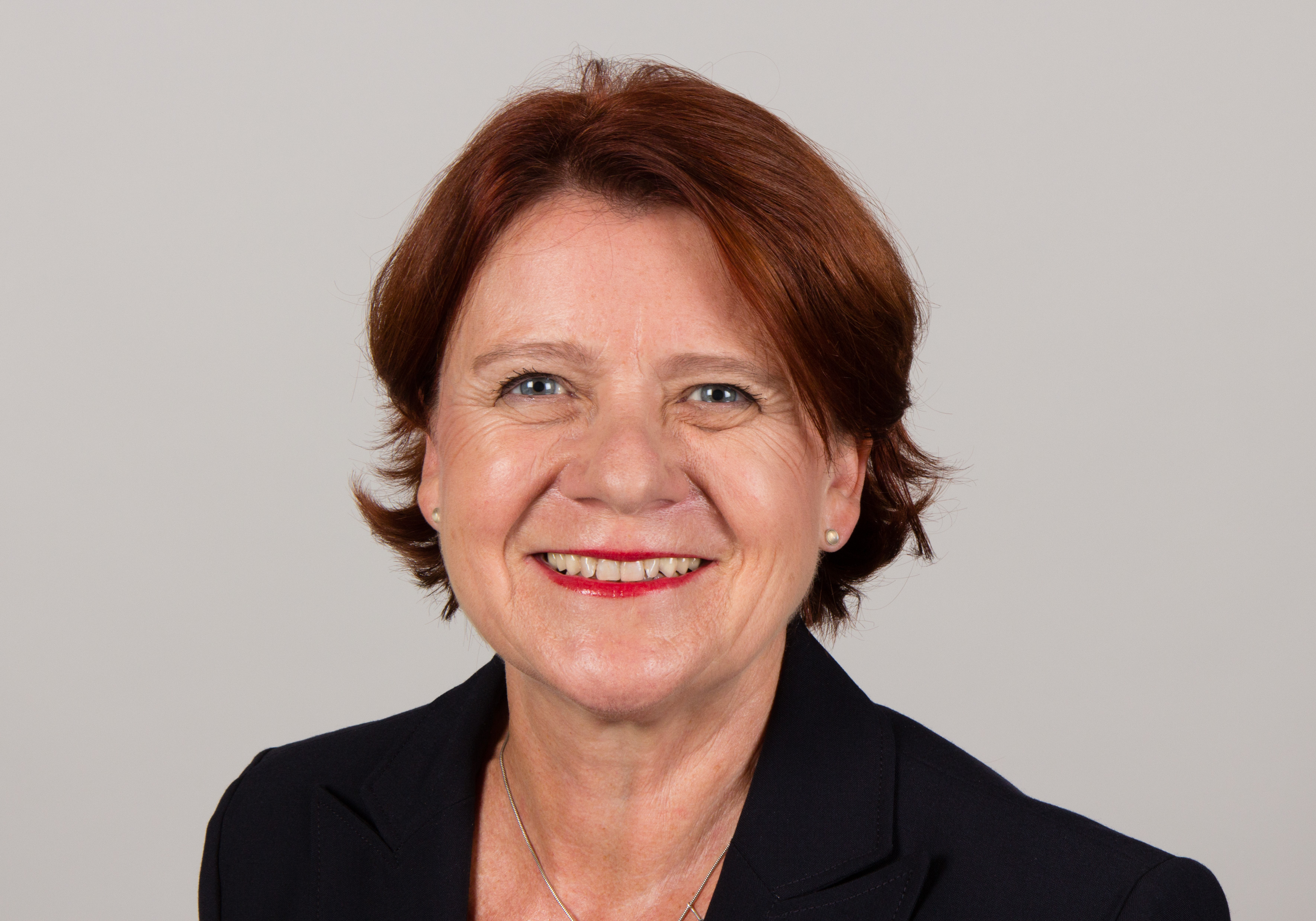
- Annette Sawade, 2014

Member of the German Bundestag
- In office 2012–2017

Personal details
- Born: 23 April 1953 (age 73) Nordhausen, Germany
- Party: Social Democratic Party of Germany (SPD)
- Children: 3
- Education: Humboldt University of Berlin
- Occupation: Politician

Annette Sawade (born 23 April 1953, Nordhausen) is a German politician and a member of the Social Democratic Party of Germany. She was a member of the German Bundestag from 2012 to 2017. She was a candidate in both the 2013 and 2017 German federal elections in the electoral district of Schwäbisch Hall – Hohenlohe.

From 1972 to 1976, she attended Humboldt University of Berlin. She is a member of the Evangelical Church.
