= Yvonne Ploetz =

German politician (born 1984)

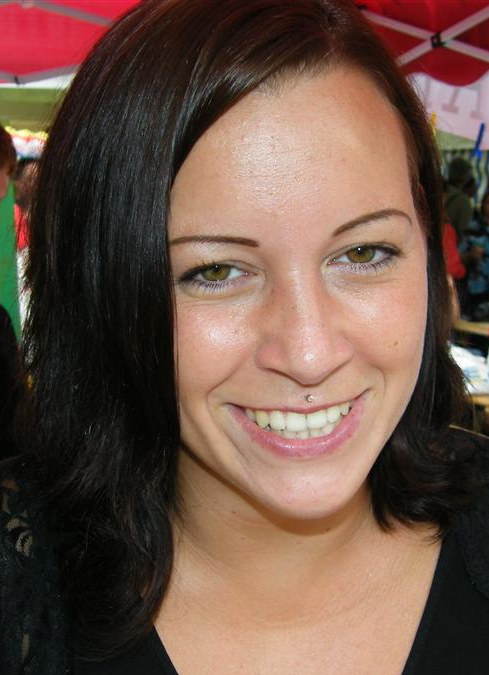
Yvonne Ploetz (2010)

Yvonne Ploetz (born 28 September 1984) is a German politician and member of SPD former member of The Left (die Linke). On 1 February 2010, she became a member of the German Parliament when she succeeded Oskar Lafontaine.

== Background and education ==
Ploetz was born on 28 September 1984 in Saarbrücken. After completing her Realschule requirements at the Gesamtschule Gersheim and passing the Abitur in 2004 at the Helmholtz-Gymnasium in Zweibrücken, she attended the University of Trier, where she studied political science, art history, and sociology. In 2011, she earned her (Magisterium), the German equivalent of a master's degree. From 2006 to 2010, she received a scholarship from the Rosa Luxemburg Foundation, which is a research foundation associated with The Left. Her research emphasis revolved around East Asian political science, as well as gender and postcolonial studies. She speaks German, English, French, and Chinese.

== Politics ==
=== Party politics ===
At the age of 14, Ploetz became a member of the Young Union, which is the youth wing of the conservative CDU and CSU parties. She remained a member until 2002. In 2005, she became a member of the Party of Democratic Socialism (PDS), the political successor of the Socialist Unity Party, which dominated East German politics. In 2007, the PDS merged with other left parties to become The Left. In November 2005, Ploetz founded the local chapter of The Left in Blieskastel, and she has been the chairperson of this chapter ever since. From 2006 to 2008, she was the spokesperson for education in the Saarbrücken statewide chapter of The Left. Since 2008, she has been a member of the executive committee of the Saarbrücken/Rheinland-Pfalz regional party chapter. In October 2010, she was elected to the state committee of the Left Youth Solid, which is the official youth wing of The Left. Her focus has been on improvements in youth and education policies.

=== Public office ===
In the 2009 German Federal election, held 27 September 2009, Ploetz was third on the party list of The Left in Saarland and was, as a result, not elected to parliament. After the resignation of Oskar Lefontaine, who left parliament for health reasons, Ploetz was able to assume his seat on 1 February 2010 and become a member of parliament. In the 2013 election she stood unsuccessfully in the Homburg constituency, but was elected from the Saarland land list. She is a regular member of the Committee for Family, Seniors, Women and Youth and a substitute member of the Committee on Education, Research and Technology Assessment.

=== Political positions ===
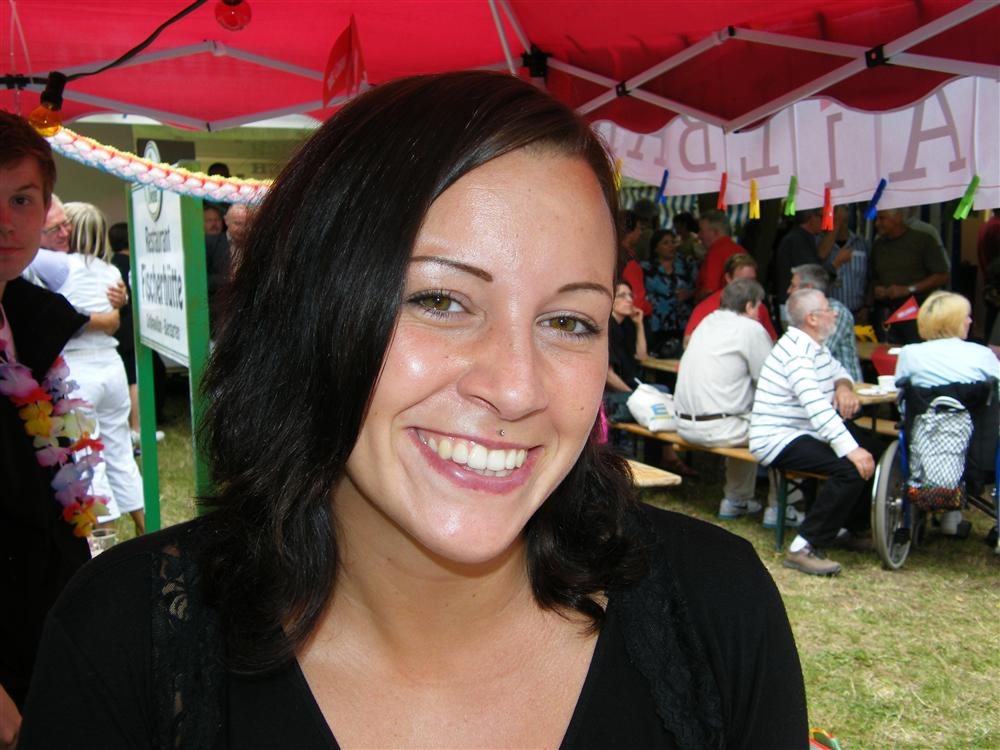
Yvonne Ploetz at the Summer Fest for The Left (2010)

Plloetz's work lies primarily in the arena of domestic policy, with her core policy interests concerning youth, education, women and the poor. She extensively uses popular media, such as social networks and the internet in general, to disseminate relevant information and concerns related to these policy efforts. She bases her efforts on what is submitted to her from her constituency.

Specifically, Ploetz has called for limitations to executive salaries, the introduction of a nationwide minimum wage, the regulation of internships, the introduction of a fundamental right to education, the full equality of men and women, the end of the nuclear age, lowering the voting age to 16, and the termination of foreign missions for the German Army.

She often combines science and politics. In this style, she criticized, for example, the "Green Deal" for being too technocratic and not doing enough to consider underlying social contexts. Additionally, she focused German political attention on the environmental disaster caused by the Deepwater Horizon oil spill in the Gulf of Mexico, and was involved in an analysis of the program of the Youth in Science Forum in February 2011.

She also supported education-reform strikes in 2010, and in 2011, she launched the outreach program "Jugend.Arm? Courage!" which sought to address youth poverty. In particular, the initiation of a crash program to combat youth unemployment has been a key policy point. Regarding the German education system, she has criticized the BAföG as well as the national scholarship program of the federal government, which, she has argued, only further reinforces social inequality, rather than fighting it. Nowadays she is a member of SPD and works as an SPD group advisor in the local Parliament of the state of Saarland.

== Personal life ==
Ploetz has a brown belt in judo and, in 2008, became the Saarland women's leader in the 70 kilogram class. For many years she has played soccer with SG Parr Medelsheim. Additionally, she is a member of IG Metall (a metal-workers' union), the Judo Club of Gersheim, the Rosa Luxemburg Foundation, and the Alumni Association of Trier Political Scientists, as well as the Peter Imandt Society.
