= Ingrid Nestle =

German politician (born 1977)

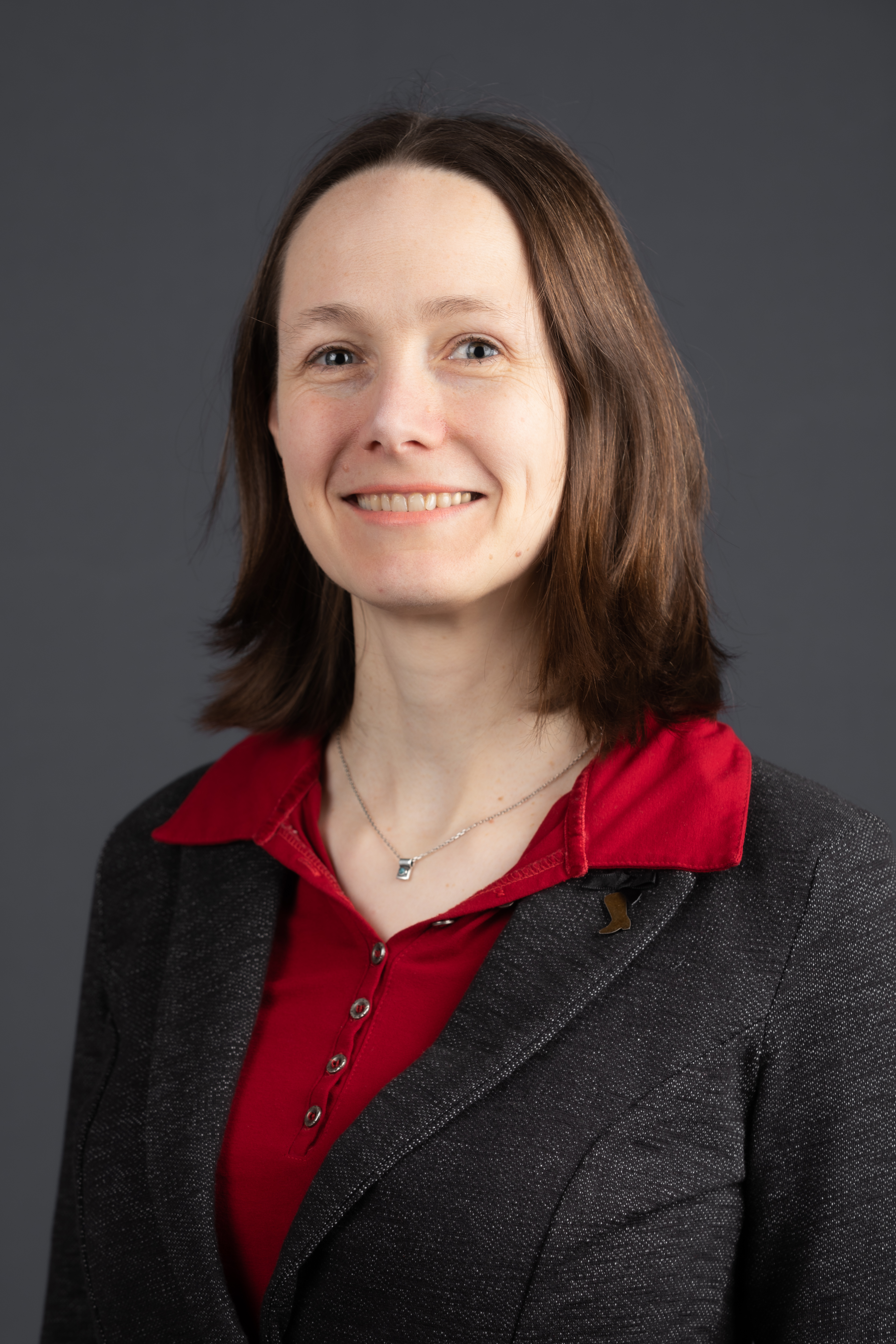
- Nestle in 2020

Member of the Bundestag
- In office 2009–2012
- Incumbent
- Assumed office 2017

Personal details
- Born: 22 December 1977 (age 48) Schwäbisch Gmünd, West Germany (now Germany)
- Party: Greens
- Education: University of Flensburg

Ingrid Nestle (born 22 December 1977) is a German politician of Alliance 90/The Greens who has been a member of the Bundestag, the German parliament, from 2009 to 2012 and since 2017.

== Early life and education ==
Nestle was born in Schwäbisch Gmünd. From 1998 to 2003 she studied energy management and environmental management at the University of Flensburg. Her 2012 dissertation in economics was titled "The costs of climate change in the agricultural sector – A comparison of two calculation approaches" She now lives in Elmshorn.

== Political career ==
Nestle became a member of the Green party in 2001.

From 2012 to 2017, Nestle served as state secretary under minister Robert Habeck in the state government of Minister-President Torsten Albig of Schleswig-Holstein.

Nestle has been a member of the German Bundestag since the 2017 elections, representing the Steinburg – Dithmarschen South districts. In parliament, she has since been serving on the Committee on Economic Affairs and Energy.

In the negotiations to form a so-called traffic light coalition of the Social Democratic Party (SPD), the Green Party and the Free Democratic Party (FDP) following the 2021 federal elections, Nestle was part of her party's delegation in the working group on climate protection and energy policy, co-chaired by Matthias Miersch, Oliver Krischer and Lukas Köhler.

Nestle announced in October 2024, that she will not seeking re-election for Bundestag in February 2025.

== Other activities ==
- Federal Network Agency for Electricity, Gas, Telecommunications, Post and Railway (BNetzA), Member of the Advisory Board (since 2018)
