= Barbara Höll =

German politician

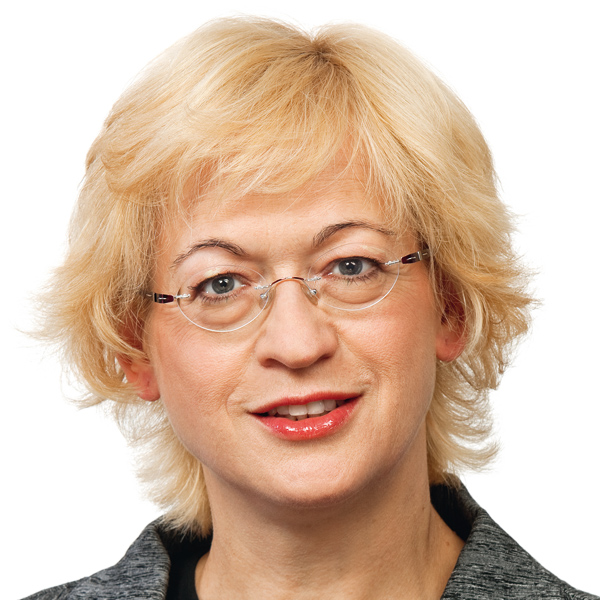

Member of the Bundestag
- In office 1990–2002, from 2005–2013

Deputy chair of The Left parliamentary group
- In office 2005–2009

Personal details
- Born: 26 December 1957 (age 68)
- Party: Die Linke

Barbara Höll (born Barbara Eisenberger, 26 December 1957 in Coswig) is a German former politician. A member of Die Linke, she served in the Bundestag from 1990 to 2002, and from 2005 to 2013. She was deputy chair of The Left parliamentary group in the German Bundestag from 2005 to 2009.
