= Bettina Kudla =

German politician

Bettina Kudla MP
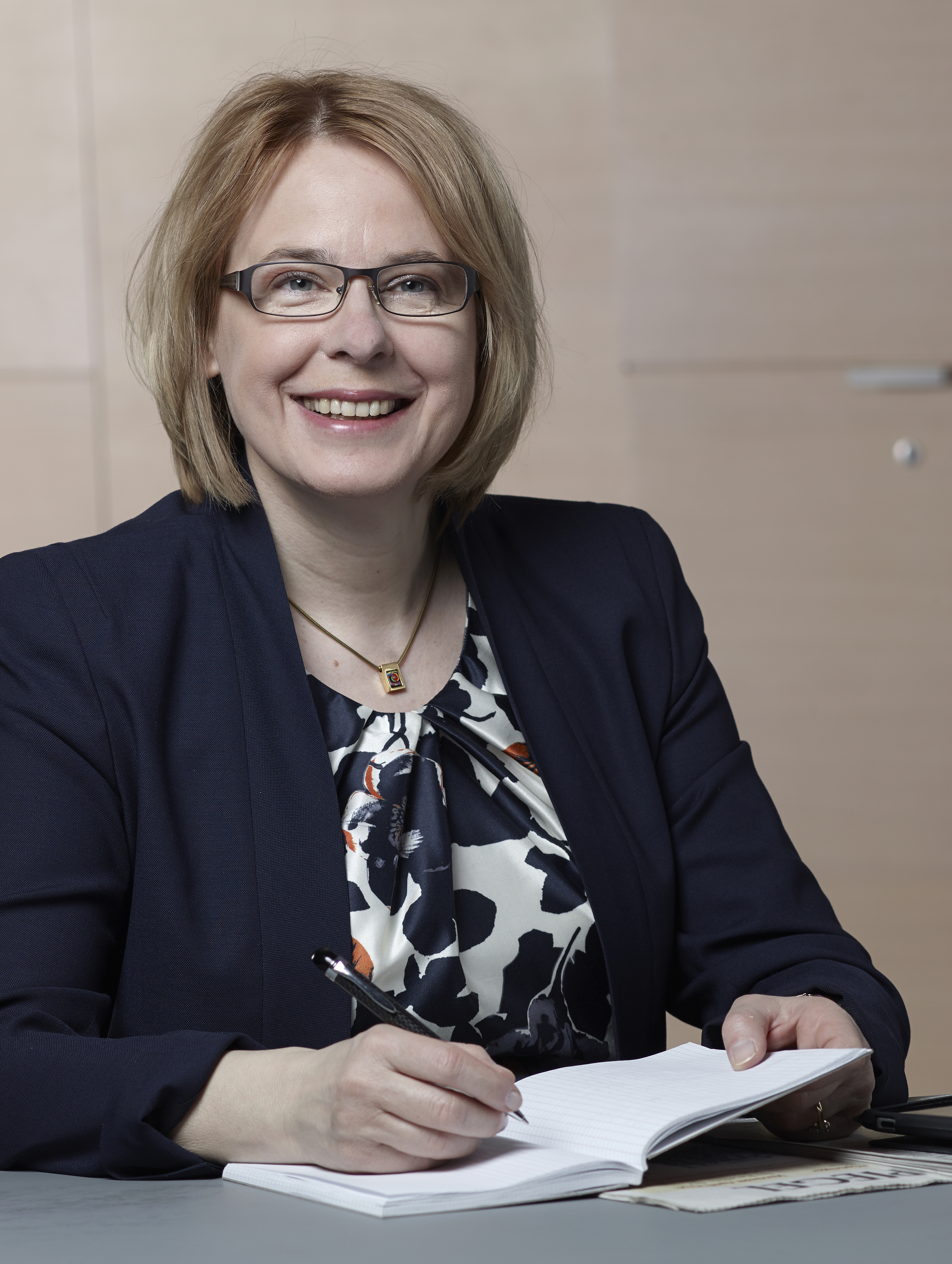

Member of the Bundestag
- In office 27 September 2009 – 2017
- Constituency: Leipzig I (2009, 2013)

Personal details
- Born: 20 July 1962 (age 64) Munich, Germany
- Citizenship: Germany
- Party: Christian Democratic Union of Germany (CDU)
- Education: LMU Munich
- Occupation: Politician and auditor
- Website: BettinaKudla.de

Bettina Irene Kudla (born 20 July 1962) is a German politician who served as a Member of Federal Parliament for Leipzig from Christian Democratic Union of Germany (CDU) from 2009 to 2017.

== Early life and career ==
Having studied business administration at LMU Munich, Kudla worked as auditor and tax advisor with Deloitte in Munich and Halle (Saale) from 1988 until 2004.

== Political career ==
Kudla joined the Parliament with 33.3% of the vote at the 2009 election and she was elected again with 40% of the vote at the 2013 election.

In parliament, Kudla was a member of the Finance Committee and the Budget Committee's Sub-Committee on European Union Affairs. On the Finance Committee, she was her parliamentary group's rapporteur on all issues related to the Federal Central Tax Office (BZSt) and tax advisors.

When the Bundestag balloted a joint motion of CDU/CSU, SPD and Greens dealing the Armenian genocide and other indigenous and Christian ethnic groups such as the Assyrians and the Ottoman Greeks in 1915, Kudla was the only Bundestag member that voted against the motion.

In September 2016, Kudla published two tweets which got much criticism for their language and content. Kudla finally deleted the tweets. One of them had criticized chancellor Merkel's migrant policy; the other had insulted Can Dündar.

== Other activities ==
- Ifo Institute for Economic Research, Member of the Board of Trustees
- Sparkassen Versicherung Holding AG Sachsen, Member of the Advisory Board
- German Council on Foreign Relations (DGAP), Member
- Institute of Public Auditors in Germany (IDW), Member

Kudla is deputy chairwoman of the German-Cypriot Parliamentary Friendship group, member of the German-Russian Parliamentary Friendship Group and member of the German-Israeli Parliamentary Friendship Group.
