= Patrick Döring =

German politician (born 1973)

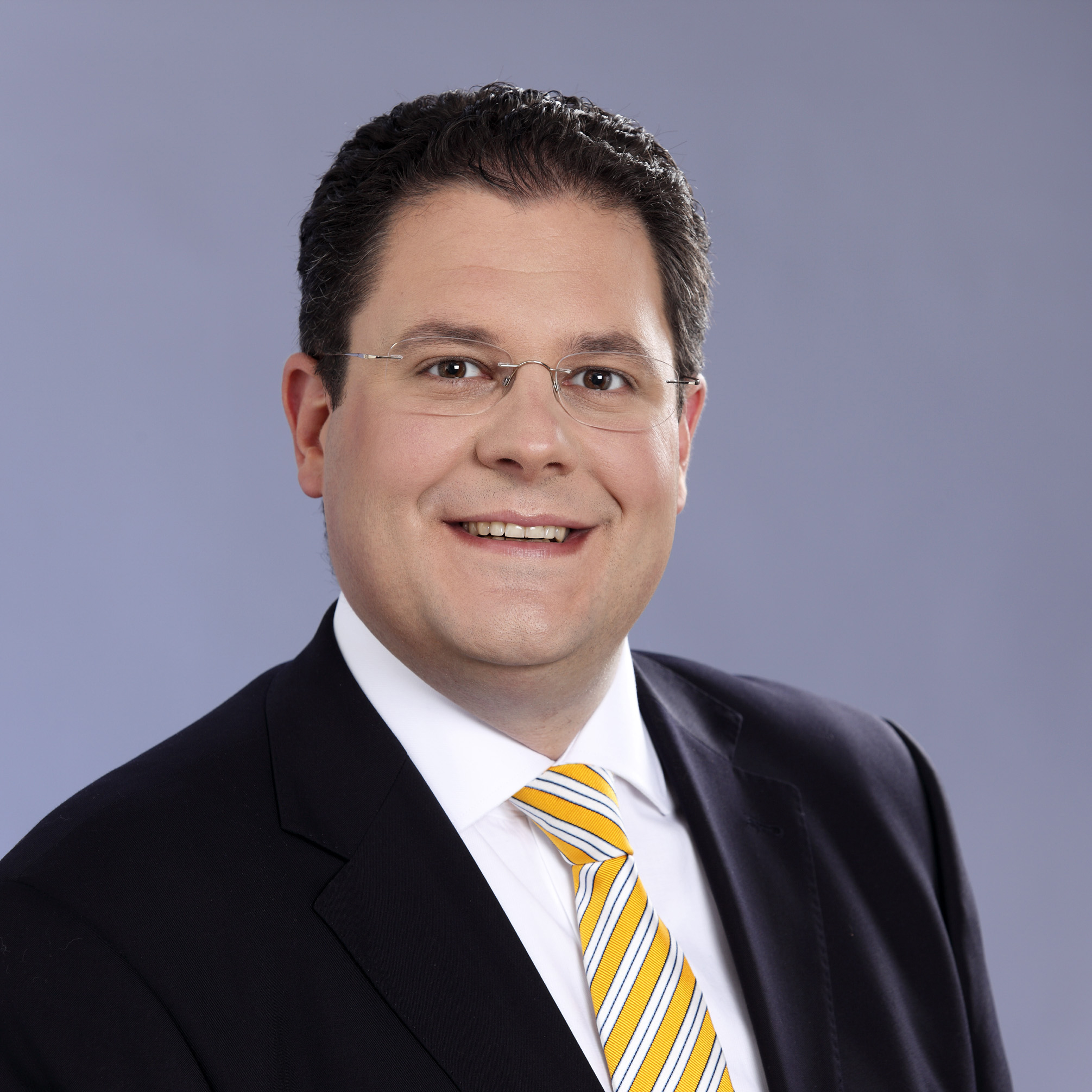
Döring in 2009

Patrick Döring (German pronunciation: [ˈpatʁɪk ˈdøːʁɪŋ]; born 6 May 1973 in Stade, Lower Saxony) is a German politician and member of the FDP in the Bundestag from 2005 to 2013.

== Other activities ==
- Commerzbank, Member of the Regional Advisory Board for Northern Germany
