= Green Party faction (Bundestag) =

Parliamentary subgroup of Germany's Green Party

The German Green Party (German: Bündnis 90/Die Grünen – following a 1993 merger with former East German Alliance 90) has been present in the German parliament (Bundestag) continuously since 29 March 1983 as a parliamentary party. The status as a Fraktion was lost from 1990 to 1994, being demoted to a Gruppe (group), after only the East German wing managed to pass the 5% election threshold in the December 1990 German federal election. The party is mostly focused on environmental issues.

== 10th Bundestag (1983–1987) ==
Scoring 5.6% in the federal parliamentary elections in 1983, the Greens entered the Bundestag for the first time with a total of 28 seats. Faction members were rotated after two years in 1985 (with the exception of Petra Kelly and Gert Bastian), but the concept was abolished in May 1986 again. The executive board, elected by faction members on 3 April 1984, consisted of Annemarie Borgmann, Waltraud Schoppe, Antje Vollmer, Christa Nickels, Heidemarie Dann and Erika Hickel.

The members of the faction were:

- Hendrik Auhagen (1985–1987)
- Sabine Bard (1983–1985)
- Gert Bastian (1983–1987, not a member of the faction from 1984 to 1986)
- Marieluise Beck (1983–1985)
- Dieter Burgmann (1983–1985)
- Annemarie Borgmann (1985–1987)
- Eberhard Bueb (1985–1987)
- Heidemarie Dann (1985–1987)
- Dieter Drabiniok (1983–1985)
- Wolfgang Ehmke (1983–1985)
- Uschi Eid (1985–1987)
- Joschka Fischer (1983–1985)
- Ulrich Fischer (1986–1987)
- Horst Fritsch (1986–1987)
- Gabriele Gottwald (1983–1985)
- Klaus Hecker (1983)
- Erika Hickel (1983–1985)
- Hannegret Hönes (1985–1987)
- Milan Horacek (1983–1985, successor of Klaus Hecker)
- Willi Hoss (1983–1985)
- Gert Jannsen (1983–1985)
- Petra Kelly (1983–1987)
- Hubert Kleinert (1983–1986)
- Julius Kriszan (1983–1985)
- Torsten Lange (1985–1987)
- Norbert Mann (1985–1987)
- Joachim Müller (1985–1987)
- Christa Nickels (1983–1985)
- Gabriele Potthast (1983–1985)
- Jürgen Reents (1983–1985)
- Christa Reetz (1983–1985)
- Herbert Rusche (1985–1987)
- Walter Sauermilch (1983–1985)
- Henning Schierholz (1985–1987)
- Otto Schily (1983–1986)
- Christian Schmidt (1985–1987)
- Dirk Schneider (1983–1985)
- Waltraud Schoppe (1983–1985)
- Walter Schwenninger (1983–1985)
- Stefan Schulte (1985–1987)
- Hans-Werner Senfft (1985–1987)
- Eckhard Stratmann (1983–1985)
- Hans-Christian Ströbele (1985–1987)
- Heinz Suhr (1985–1987)
- Willi Tatge (1986–1987)
- Udo Tischer (1985–1987, left the faction in 1986)
- Hans Verheyen (1983–1985)
- Axel Vogel (1985–1987)
- Roland Vogt (1983–1985)
- Antje Vollmer (1983–1985)
- Ludger Volmer (1985–1987)
- Marita Wagner (1985–1987)
- Gerd Werner (1985–1987)
- Helmut Werner (1985–1987)
- Karin Zeitler (1985–1987)

== 11th Bundestag (1987–1990) ==
In the 1987 parliamentary elections, the Green Party managed to increase its share of votes to 8.3%, gaining 44 parliament seats in the process. When the East German parliament, the Volkskammer, which was freely elected on 18 March 1990 for the first time, was disbanded in the process of the German reunification, another 7 seats were added as 7 members of the 21-member Volkskammer faction of the Green Party, elected by their peers, entered the Bundestag.

The members of the faction were:

- Marieluise Beck-Oberdorf
- Angelika Beer
- Helga Brahmst-Rock
- Hans-Joachim Brauer
- Ulrich Briefs (left the faction in 1990)
- Wolfgang Daniels
- Thomas Ebermann (1987–1989)
- Tay Eich (1989–1990)
- Uschi Eid
- Dora Flinner
- Sieglinde Friess (1989–1990)
- Charlotte Garbe
- Gerald Häfner
- Karitas Hensel
- Imma Hillerich
- Willi Hoss
- Uwe Hüser
- Petra Kelly
- Hubert Kleinert
- Wilhelm Knabe
- Almut Kottwitz (1989–1990)
- Matthias Kreuzeder
- Verena Krieger (1987–1989)
- Helmut Lippelt
- Alfred Mechtersheimer
- German Meneses-Vogl (1989–1990)
- Christa Nickels
- Jutta Oesterle-Schwerin
- Ellen Olms (1987–1989)
- Norbert Roske (1990)
- Bärbel Rust
- Hannelore Saibold
- Gertrud Schilling
- Otto Schily (left the faction in 1989 and became a member of the SPD faction)
- Marieluise Schmidt (1989–1990)
- Regula Schmidt-Bott (1987–1989)
- Waltraud Schoppe
- Peter Sellin (1987–1989)
- Eckhard Stratmann
- Manfred Such (1989–1990)
- Maria Luise Teubner
- Erika Trenz
- Trude Unruh (left the faction in 1989)
- Christa Vennegerts
- Antje Vollmer
- Ludger Volmer
- Michael Weiß
- Dietrich Wetzel
- Heike Wilms-Kegel
- Lieselotte Wollny
- Thomas Wüppesahl (left the faction on 26 January 1988)

== 12th Bundestag (1990–1994) ==
In 1990, elections were held separately in former East and West Germany; in West Germany, the Green Party did not manage to gain enough votes to enter parliament, only scoring 4.8% instead of the necessary 5%, but in East Germany, the Greens gained a 6.1% share of the votes and 8 seats in the Bundestag. While a green presence in the 12th Bundestag was thus secured, the Greens could not form a faction, instead remaining a "group" (with fewer rights and a smaller budget).

The members of the faction were:

- Klaus-Dieter Feige
- Ingrid Köppe
- Vera Lengsfeld
- Gerd Poppe
- Christina Schenk (left the faction in 1994)
- Werner Schulz
- Wolfgang Ullmann
- Konrad Weiß

== 13th Bundestag (1994–1998) ==
4 years later, in 1994, the Greens managed to recover their losses, achieving 7.3% and entering the parliament with 48 seats. Antje Vollmer, long-time member of the faction, was elected as first Green Vice President of the Bundestag with the help of the CDU faction.

The members of the faction included:

- Elisabeth Altmann
- Gila Altmann
- Marieluise Beck
- Volker Beck
- Angelika Beer
- Matthias Berninger
- Annelie Buntenbach
- Amke Dietert-Scheuer
- Franziska Eichstädt-Bohlig
- Uschi Eid
- Andrea Fischer
- Joschka Fischer
- Rita Grießhaber
- Gerald Häfner
- Antje Hermenau
- Kristin Heyne
- Ulrike Höfken
- Michaele Hustedt
- Manuel Kiper
- Monika Knoche
- Angelika Köster-Loßack
- Steffi Lemke
- Vera Lengsfeld (left the faction in 1996 and became a member of the CDU faction)
- Helmut Lippelt
- Oswald Metzger
- Kerstin Müller
- Winfried Nachtwei
- Christa Nickels
- Egbert Nitsch (1994–1996)
- Cem Özdemir
- Gerd Poppe
- Simone Probst
- Jürgen Rochlitz
- Hannelore Saibold
- Christine Scheel
- Irmingard Schewe-Gerigk
- Rezzo Schlauch
- Albert Schmidt
- Wolfgang Schmitt
- Ursula Schönberger
- Waltraud Schoppe
- Werner Schulz
- Rainder Steenblock (1996–1998)
- Marina Steindor
- Christian Sterzing
- Manfred Such
- Antje Vollmer
- Ludger Volmer
- Helmut Wilhelm
- Margareta Wolf

== 14th Bundestag (1998–2002) ==
In 1998, the Green Party suffered slight losses, dropping down to 6.7%, but still managed to gain 47 seats in a larger parliament. For the first time it was possible to form a red-green government coalition with the election-winning SPD.

The members of the faction were:

- Gila Altmann
- Marieluise Beck
- Volker Beck
- Angelika Beer
- Matthias Berninger
- Grietje Bettin (2000–2002)
- Annelie Buntenbach
- Ekin Deligöz
- Amke Dietert-Scheuer (2002)
- Thea Dückert
- Franziska Eichstädt-Bohlig
- Uschi Eid
- Hans-Josef Fell
- Andrea Fischer
- Joschka Fischer
- Katrin Göring-Eckardt
- Rita Grießhaber
- Gerald Häfner (2001–2002)
- Winfried Hermann
- Antje Hermenau
- Kristin Heyne
- Ulrike Höfken
- Michaele Hustedt
- Monika Knoche
- Angelika Köster-Loßack
- Steffi Lemke
- Helmut Lippelt
- Reinhard Loske
- Oswald Metzger
- Kerstin Müller
- Klaus Müller (1998–2000)
- Winfried Nachtwei
- Christa Nickels
- Cem Özdemir
- Simone Probst
- Claudia Roth (1998–2001)
- Christine Scheel
- Irmingard Schewe-Gerigk
- Rezzo Schlauch
- Albert Schmidt
- Werner Schulz
- Christian Simmert
- Christian Sterzing
- Hans-Christian Ströbele
- Jürgen Trittin
- Antje Vollmer
- Ludger Volmer
- Sylvia Voß
- Helmut Wilhelm
- Margareta Wolf

== 15th Bundestag (2002–2005) ==
While the ruling SPD suffered substantial losses during the 2002 parliamentary elections and only barely managed to become the biggest faction in the Bundestag, the Green Party gained 1.9 points compared to the 1998 elections, for a total of 8.6%, yielding 55 seats.

The members of the faction were:

- Kerstin Andreae
- Marieluise Beck
- Volker Beck
- Cornelia Behm
- Birgitt Bender
- Matthias Berninger
- Grietje Bettin
- Alexander Bonde
- Ekin Deligöz
- Thea Dückert
- Jutta Dümpe-Krüger
- Franziska Eichstädt-Bohlig
- Uschi Eid
- Hans-Josef Fell
- Joschka Fischer
- Katrin Göring-Eckardt
- Anja Hajduk
- Winfried Hermann
- Antje Hermenau
- Peter Hettlich
- Ulrike Höfken
- Thilo Hoppe
- Michaele Hustedt
- Renate Künast
- Fritz Kuhn
- Markus Kurth
- Undine Kurth
- Reinhard Loske
- Anna Lührmann
- Jerzy Montag
- Kerstin Müller
- Winfried Nachtwei
- Christa Nickels
- Friedrich Ostendorff
- Simone Probst
- Claudia Roth
- Krista Sager
- Christine Scheel
- Irmingard Schewe-Gerigk
- Rezzo Schlauch
- Albert Schmidt
- Werner Schulz
- Petra Selg
- Ursula Sowa
- Rainder Steenblock
- Silke Stokar
- Hans-Christian Ströbele
- Jürgen Trittin
- Marianne Tritz
- Hubert Ulrich
- Antje Vogel-Sperl
- Antje Vollmer
- Ludger Volmer
- Josef Winkler
- Margareta Wolf

== 16th Bundestag (2005–2009) ==
The ruling SPD/Green Party suffered losses during the 2005 parliamentary elections leading to a Grand Coalition between the SPD and the CDU/CSU. The Green Party lost four seats to go from 55 to 51 and went into opposition with the FDP and the Left Party.

The members of the faction were:

- Kerstin Andreae
- Marieluise Beck
- Cornelia Behm
- Birgitt Bender
- Alexander Bonde
- Ekin Deligöz
- Thea Dückert
- Uschi Eid
- Hans-Josef Fell
- Kai Gehring
- Katrin Göring-Eckardt
- Anja Hajduk
- Britta Haßelmann
- Winfried Hermann
- Peter Hettlich
- Priska Hinz
- Ulrike Höfken
- Bärbel Höhn
- Anton Hofreiter
- Thilo Hoppe
- Ute Koczy
- Sylvia Kotting-Uhl
- Renate Künast
- Fritz Kuhn
- Markus Kurth
- Undine Kurth
- Monika Lazar
- Reinhard Loske
- Anna Lührmann
- Nicole Maisch
- Jerzy Montag
- Kerstin Müller
- Winfried Nachtwei
- Omid Nouripour
- Brigitte Pothmer
- Claudia Roth
- Krista Sager
- Elisabeth Scharfenberg
- Christine Scheel
- Irmingard Schewe-Gerigk
- Gerhard Schick
- Grietje Staffelt
- Rainder Steenblock
- Silke Stokar von Neuforn
- Hans-Christian Ströbele
- Harald Terpe
- Jürgen Trittin
- Wolfgang Wieland
- Josef Philip Winkler
- Margareta Wolf

== As of the 2020s ==
In 2021, the Green party elected the first two transgender members of the Bundestag. As of 2025, there were 180,000 members in the country.
