= Waltraud Schoppe =

German politician (born 1942)

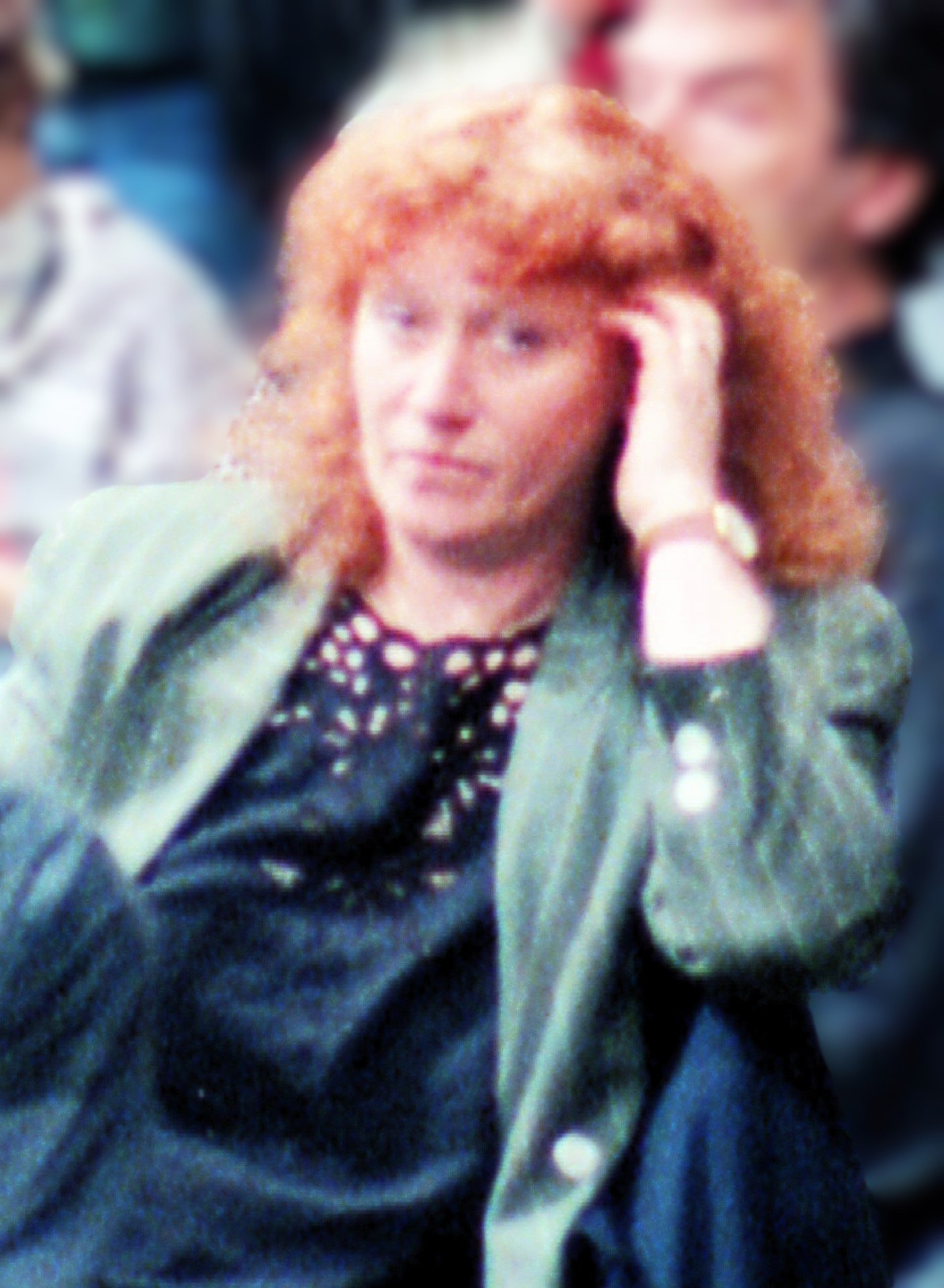
- Schoppe in 1989
- Born: Waltraud Sobanek; 27 June 1942 (age 83); Bremen-Aumund, Germany
- Occupations: Secretary, teacher, politician, antiques dealer

Waltraud Schoppe (born 27 June 1942) has served as a teacher and politician in Germany. She left school at a young age and worked as a secretary, later marrying and earning a teaching certificate. She became involved in university politics and the anti-nuclear and women's movements in the 1970s. A founding member of the West German Green Party, she made a taboo-breaking speech in the Bundestag in 1983 on the subject of abortion and marital rape, challenging for the first time the sexism women encountered in the legislature. She was one of the members of the first all-woman party directorates in Germany, when the Green Party elected six women to head the party in 1984.

Schoppe served in the 10th, 11th, and 13th legislative terms. In her first two terms she worked on social legislation, such as decriminalizing abortion, child protection laws, and anti-violence measures, but she opposed the anti-pornography movement on the basis that its use was a personal decision. She was one of the leaders of the Realo faction of the West German Greens and supported the red–green alliance with the Social Democrats. Between 1990 and 1994, she served as the first Women's Affairs Minister of Lower Saxony and then returned to the Bundestag between 1994 and 1998. In her final term in parliament, she focused primarily on foreign affairs, supporting the rights of nations to self-determination and the development of refugee policies protecting human rights. In 1997, marital rape, an issue she had first introduced to the Bundestag, became a criminal offense. Schoppe retired from politics in 1998 and became an antiques dealer.

== Early life and education ==
Waltraud Sobanek was born on 27 June 1942 in Bremen-Aumund, Germany. Her father was an aircraft engineer and her mother owned and operated a grocery store. Her mother died around 1958, causing Sobanek to leave school after the 10th grade and train as a secretary. Sobanek married in the early 1960s and had two sons, Willy and Philip Schoppe in 1965 and 1967, before divorcing. She raised her children alone in the countryside around Diepholz. She passed her abitur examination in 1969, and decided to train as a teacher. Between 1973 and 1979, she studied German and history at the University of Bremen and was active in university politics, women's groups and anti-nuclear initiatives. Among the initiatives she was involved in were creation of a child care center and bicycle paths in Bremen. At the completion of her studies, she passed the state examination to teach high school. Schoppe taught as a teacher-trainee at the gymnasium in Oldenburg in 1982.

== Career ==
=== Political involvement (1979–1985) ===
Schoppe was one of the founders in 1979 of the Green Party faction in Diepholz, which favored environmental protection and opposed war. She served as chair of the local branch. When the Greens first won seats in the Bundestag in 1983, she was selected to represent Lower Saxony and moved to Bonn. When the Green Party formed, two-year term limits were placed on both officers and sitting representatives. Schoppe's first term in office was from 1983 to 1985. On 5 May 1983, in her first presentation in the Bundestag, Schoppe delivered a speech "Women, Abortion, and Marital Rape" during the legislative debates to revise paragraph 218, the West German Abortion Law, of the criminal code. In the speech, she pointed out that legislating abortion allowed politicians, who were mostly male, to make health care decisions for women. She observed that making abortion illegal punished only the woman who was pregnant, not the man who was equally responsible for the pregnancy. Based on this, she argued that abortion should not be a legal matter, but left to a woman's moral convictions. She also encouraged legislation which had harsh penalties for marital rape. Her speech was met with "demeaning insults, jeers, and jokes" from members of the other political parties, and general disapproval by the "male-dominated ranks of the traditional parties". Schoppe's address marked the first time that patriarchy and sexism had been challenged in the parliament and that taboo-topics dealing with sexuality had been openly addressed in the legislature.

Schoppe was appointed to serve as a deputy member on the Committee for Economic Affairs and the Committee for Labor and Social Order. She was a full member of the Committee for Youth, Family and Health. Her first term in office was marked by her advocacy for women's equality, elimination of the criminalization of abortion, and legislation which addressed family violence and protected children. In April 1984, Schoppe was elected to serve on the directorate of the Green Party, along with Annemarie Borgmann, Heidemarie Dann, Erika Hickel, Christa Nickels, and Antje Vollmer. Schoppe and Vollmer served as the speakers in the Bundestag with Borgmann as their successor. Nickels served as the party's whip, and Dann and Hickel were appointed as her deputies. It was the first time in Germany that any political party had elected an all-woman board to lead the party. The group was hopeful that other parties would follow suit or that women from across the political spectrum could unite on issues and work together. Schoppe favored more transparency from and compromise between politicians to promote a robust democracy. She also supported parliamentary reforms and backed the creation of an independent body with oversight for Bundestag policies. Because of the rotation system, Schoppe was forced to resign her seat in 1985. At the party conference preceding the next election cycle, she advocated for party reforms, including abandonment of the rotation system, which was adopted for Lower Saxony in 1986.

=== 11th Bundestag session (1987–1990) ===
Schoppe was elected to a second term in office in 1987, for a full four-year period, and returned to her appointment on the Committee for Youth, Family and Health. Alice Schwarzer through her magazine EMMA began a campaign, "PorNo" in 1987, to protect women from exploitation by the sex industry, to strengthen the ban on violent pornography, and allow women to privately sue pornography producers. When the Bundestag debated changing pornography laws the following year, Schoppe opposed the anti-porn movement on the basis that use of pornography was a personal decision and that films might be deemed innocuous or offensive depending on the viewer. (Note: Charlotte Wiedemann quoted Schoppe in Die Tageszeitung as saying, "Es sei eine 'Anmaßung' und 'sexualfeindlich', für andere Frauen entscheiden zu wollen, was sie schön zu finden hätten und was nicht. Sexualität und Pornographie würden gerade von der 'Grenzüberschreitung' leben; was dabei sexistisch sei, unterliege subjektiver Wertung." ["It is 'presumptuous' and 'anti-sexual' to want to decide for other women what they should and should not find beautiful. Sexuality and pornography thrive on 'crossing boundaries'; what is sexist in this depends on subjective evaluation".]) From 1988, she served on the four-member Children's Commission of the Bundestag. The commission had no authority to veto legislation, but could recommend legislation and advise if proposed legislation complied with the principle of the "best interests of the child". One of their first lobbying efforts concerned establishing speed limits for urban areas. Other issues on their agenda were changes to guardianship laws to protect the rights for children in foster care and liability legislation to prevent owners from dodging responsibility for endangering a child merely by posting a sign that danger existed or that land was restricted. They also planned focus on addressing child labor, substance abuse, violence against children, and children's mental health.

Along with Joschka Fischer, Hubert Kleinert, and Otto Schily, she was a leader in the Realo faction of the Green Party, which favored collaboration with the Social Democratic Party and recognized that to support the rights of nations to self-determination meant that they had to be able to defend themselves. Unlike some of her colleagues, she did not favor German withdrawal from NATO, but was in support of curtailing the presence of nuclear weapons throughout Europe. A wave of protest against antisemitism in Germany had begun in 1985, prompting discussion in the party on its policies and its stance toward Israel. In early 1987, Palestinian refugee camps were attacked by the Shia Amal militia, prompting the executive board of the Greens to issue a statement that they supported Palestinians' right to self-determination and the formation of an independent state under the leadership of the Palestine Liberation Organization. The sitting politicians, including Schoppe, concerned that the statement did not address the question of Israel, drafted their own statement taking a more cautious approach toward the Israeli-Palestinian conflict, which acknowledged Palestinians' right to self-determination with Israeli cooperation. Schily and Schoppe, along with Dietrich Wetzel met with Israeli president Chaim Herzog in Germany in April and again in Israel in October, hoping to encourage investigation of Israeli human rights abuses, recognition of Palestinian rights, and support for Israel. The trip brought the Green Party to the edge of a split.

In 1988, Schoppe and Gisela Wülffing campaigned for the creation of mothers' centers to help reduce the isolation many mothers experienced. They proposed establishing centers which allowed women to socialize and engage in unpaid or low-paid activities to relieve their social alienation. She also was instrumental in introducing and supporting a change in the maternal leave law to convert the legislation into a parental leave policy which included fathers receiving eight weeks of protected family leave. Schoppe said that, as proposed, the legislation only included married couples, but that it was hoped it could be extended to other partnerships in the future. The measure failed to gain support from her male colleagues. When German reunification talks began, the West German Greens favored the idea of the two countries remaining separate, fearing that a unified Germany would be seen as a threat to other Europeans. As a result, the party lost all of their parliamentary seats in the 1990 elections, but Alliance 90, the East German green party, won eight seats in parliament. (Note: As a result of the loss, the West German Greens revised their constitution in 1991 and merged with the East German party to form Alliance 90/The Greens in 1993.)

=== Women's Minister (1990–1994) ===
Gerhard Schröder became Minister-President of Lower Saxony and head of the Red–green alliance, a coalition of the Social Democrats and Greens, in 1990. He chose Monika Griefahn and Schoppe, respectively, to serve as State Minister of the Environment and State Minister of Women's Affairs. Schoppe became the first person to serve as the women's affairs minister for Lower Saxony. According to academic and politician, Rita Süssmuth, she built the largest state ministry on women in the country. Schoppe was known for networking across party lines and with other state women's departments to address women's issues. Among the programs she introduced were initiatives to provide women with legal services, to support women's shelters, to assist women who were entrepreneurs and farmers, and to create family planning centers to help mothers and children. At the state level she worked to pass legislation requiring women to make up half of the public service work force and to establish outpatient abortion services. She also worked to create national coordination offices for parental leave policies and mediation, which included career planning and training to enable returning mothers to be ready for re-employment.

In 1992, the unified German Bundestag had passed legislation to resolve differences in abortion laws between East Germany, where abortion was legal in the first twelve weeks of pregnancy, and West Germany, where it was illegal except in the case of rape, social hardship, or for medical reasons. The compromise legislation, which allowed abortion within the first trimester if performed by a physician after mandatory pro-life counseling, was sent to the Constitutional Court, in 1993. The court ruled that the law was unconstitutional because it failed to protect the life of the unborn child, and declared abortion to be illegal, but unpunishable. The court declared that only in the case of medical emergency, fetal deformity, or rape, could a physician perform an abortion after mandatory counseling and that health insurance could not pay for the procedure without the doctor's consent. The only concession to women's arguments in favor of abortion was acknowledgment that the choice to obtain an abortion was the woman's decision. Schoppe refused to accept the ruling, and not only attacked the court's decision, vowing to continue the fight, but argued that the 1974 legislation itself had been designed to mitigate abuses of sterilization and abortion which had been hallmarks of the earlier fascist regime. She pointed out that "women were neither the perpetrators of that regime, intent on exterminating whole peoples, nor would their individual decisions to terminate a pregnancy augur a return to totalitarianism".

=== 13th Bundestag session (1994–1998) ===
By mid-1993, the coalition between the Social Democrats and Greens had begun to fracture. Schoppe was forced out of the minister's office in 1994, when the Social Democrats won the election, and the Green's state women's caucus branded her as a "pseudo post-feminist", characterizing her work in the ministry as having concerned itself with "self-help groups for prostitutes" and members of the "housewives' association". Nonetheless, Schoppe returned to the Bundestag, serving in the 13th legislative session from 1994 to 1998. She was a member of the Foreign Affairs Committee and a deputy member of the Committee for European Affairs. Schoppe supported German involvement in the Bosnian War, although previously she had opposed military-based foreign policy. Her rationale for changing her position, according to Süssmuth, was that military intervention was needed to prevent expansion of the conflict, that Europeans should work together to establish peace policies, and that participation in the United Nations peacekeeping effort would strengthen the UN's role in international conflict resolution. She was closely involved in establishing refugee policies during this term and called for clarification of foreign policy in Germany and Europe atlarge so that intervention did not become interference and human rights were protected. She also favored allowing the former Soviet republics to join NATO.

== Later life ==
Schoppe had intended her legislative career to be temporary and did not run again. She turned her antiques' hobby into a career. Former colleagues reported in 2013 that she was living in northern Italy.

== Legacy ==
Schoppe's maiden speech to the Bundestag became "legendary", and is seen as an important landmark for the feminist movement in Germany, as she was the first to bring the demands of women to parliamentary discussion. Her speech also introduced the Bundestag to the topic of marital rape, which was finally made a criminal offense in Germany during her third term in office in 1997. She has also been credited with the statement, "Behind every man who is successful stands a woman who supports him. And behind every successful woman stand three men who want to hold her back". Schoppe was one of the first women's affairs ministers in West Germany, and built her office in Lower Saxony from having no employees to 72 staff members. She created full-time women's representatives in all communities with over 10,000 residents in the state and increased budgeting four-fold for women's shelters. She pioneered parental leave mediation centers and helped 632 women to set up their own businesses. In 2021, the documentary film Die Unbeugsameng (The Indomitable) by Torsten Körner was released. It documented the lives of the pioneering generation of women who moved into politics and challenged the sexist view that women and power were incompatible. The film presented the accomplishments and struggles of women who ventured into politics from the 1950s until German reunification. Among the women featured were Schoppe and the other five women who led the Green Party from 1984. The film premiered on television in 2023.
