= Heidemarie Dann =

German teacher and politician

- Born: 27 March 1950 (age 76); Ludwigshafen am Rhein, Germany
- Other name: Heide Dann
- Occupations: Teacher; politician; anti-nuclear, anti-war, environmental, and women's rights activist
- Years active: 1972-present

Heidemarie Dann (born 27 March 1950) has served as a German teacher and politician, and has been active in the anti-nuclear, anti-war, environmental, and women's rights movements. She was a co-founder of the first women's shelter in Hanover and was one of the members of the first all-woman party directorates in Germany, when the West German Green Party elected six women to head the party in 1984. Rotated into the Bundestag in 1985, she worked on legislation to modify the divorce laws and to establish policies for the use of genetic technology. Dann opposed the modifications to the divorce laws because they would disadvantage women. She also opposed the use of genetic technology and in an unusual move, voted against the commission studying genetic technology's conclusions endorsing the use of biotechnology. She wrote a formal dissent, which was part of the published record. After her two-year term in office, Dann returned to activism. She was one of the subjects of a 2021 film, Die Unbeugsameng (The Indomitable) about the struggles of women who challenged the stereotype that women and power were incompatible by becoming politicians in the period before German reunification.

== Early life and education ==
Heidemarie Dann was born on 27 March 1950 in Ludwigshafen am Rhein, West Germany. After her high school matriculation, she enrolled in pedagogy studies at the Evangelical University of Applied Sciences in Hanover. During her schooling, in 1972 she began participating in political activism, and was involved in the women's movement. Violence against women was her main focus, and along with other students from the Evangelical University, she co-founded the first women's shelter in Hanover, in 1976. Working with women who had founded similar projects in Berlin and Kassel, the students worked for a year to find a house, draw up bylaws, secure financing, and seek the approval of the Hanover City Council. Dann earned her qualification to teach in 1977.

== Career ==
=== Teaching and activism (1977–1985) ===
Once premises had been found, the shelter opened in November 1977. Funds were secured to hire Dann as a teacher and she split her salary with the other workers at the shelter. She taught between 1977 and 1981, but left when funding was not renewed. She then taught at the Evangelical University from 1981 to 1985. In April 1984, Dann was elected to serve on the directorate of the West German Green Party, which advocated a platform in favor of environmental protection and against war. Other members of the directorate included Annemarie Borgmann, Erika Hickel, Christa Nickels, Waltraud Schoppe, and Antje Vollmer. Schoppe and Vollmer served as the speakers for the party in the Bundestag with Borgmann as their successor. Nickels served as the party's whip, and Dann and Hickel were appointed as her deputies. It was the first time in Germany that any political party had elected an all-woman board to lead the party. The group was hopeful that other parties would follow suit or that women from across the political spectrum could unite on issues and work together.

During this time, Dann became active in the anti-nuclear movement. Concerned about the NATO decision to place missiles from the United States throughout Europe, women activists devised a plan to meet with women in the US and urge them to become more active in opposing the Cold War and understand the plight of Europeans. Activists like Dann feared Europeans living where missiles were located would become targets should another war break out. In September 1984, she began touring the US with Luisa Morgantini, an Italian trade union leader, and Danielle Grünberg, the national coordinator of the British Women's Peace Alliance to promote US-Soviet disarmament. The women spent three weeks traveling throughout Pennsylvania, New York, Ohio, Florida, and Texas, speaking to women's groups and university students. They urged their audiences to register to vote, to oppose nuclear expansion and to back candidates who were in favor of peace in the upcoming election. They hoped to educate American women about the dangers of nuclear expansion and their fears about Ronald Reagan being elected president.

=== Politics (1985–1987) ===
When the Green Party formed in 1983, two-year term limits were placed on both officers and sitting representatives. In 1985, Dann was rotated into the Bundestag as a representative for Lower Saxony, serving until 1987. She was appointed to serve from March as a deputy member on the Committee for Verification of Elections and in April was assigned as a full member of the Committee for Postal and Telecommunications. She wrote a paper, "Theses on Cultural Politics" in 1985, arguing that the creation the previous year of the Cultural Foundation of the German States (Kulturstiftung der Länder) focused attention on metropolitan cultural expressions at the expense of those living in smaller towns and cities. She pointed out that the policies designed to assist cultural institutions were inconsistent and should work to ensure broader support of cultural traditions. Her solution to balance investment in cultural preservation and serve both urban and rural communities was to move toward mobile cultural exhibitions.

Dann participated in the debates to reform the divorce law in 1986 and unsuccessfully opposed the recommended changes. Along with Ingrid Matthäus-Maier, a member of the Social Democratic Party, Dann objected to the revisions which placed time limits and monetary restrictions on spousal maintenance. The revisions made included, what Matthäus-Maier described as guilt clauses, but were officially described as misconduct clauses. While these prevented the party who was more financially sound from evading responsibility for support, they also limited the other party from receiving more than the funds required for maintaining a reasonable standard of living. The law also removed the automatic acceptance of divorce upon application after a five-year separation. Violations of the misconduct clauses were voluntary unemployment not related to marriage or child care, and failure to contribute to maintenance of the family. The law also proposed adjustments to compensation if both parties worked and when there was no longer a need to care for the children. Matthäus-Maier warned that women would need to be made aware that they must continue to work after marriage, while Dann believed the law would lead to the social decline and poverty of women.

Dann replaced Hickel as a member of the commission studying genetic technology, when Hickel's rotation ended in 1985. Both women took part in the Heidelberg Symposium, organized by scientists in March 1986 and open to the public, to explore the benefits and dangers of genetic engineering. Dann was an opponent of genetic engineering, particularly in regard to assisting fertility. She wrote papers, some along with Maria Mies and Regine Walch, in which she argued that the need for reproductive assistance was brought about by an ideology of fertilization which advocated and pressured women into motherhood. According to scholar Margarete Bause, Dann saw fertilization technology as oppression of women and thought that it deprived them of their right to body autonomy. She was the only representative of the Greens on the committee, and refused to compromise on the party position that gene technology should not be used in human reproduction. In 1987, the commission issued their report, which endorsed biotechnology and recommended legislation to implement controls over the processes for its use. During the Enquiry Commission phase, a forum in the Bundestag which reconciled opposing views, Dann voted against the commission's conclusions. Her move was "highly irregular" as it was rare for a minority party to dissent from the majority view. Her written dissent was three times the commission's recommended length and not only questioned the final recommendations, but the method the commission used in limiting public debate and input. Her criticism was made part of the official report and made public, to avoid accusations that the commission had silenced the minority view.

=== Later activism (1987–present) ===
After her term ended in 1987, Dann returned to Hannover to continue her work with the women's shelter. She served as the coordinator of an initiative in Lower Saxony to advocate for GMO-free foods in 1997. Modeled on a similar program "GMO-Free Bavaria", the group worked to create legislation for food to be certified as having not been genetically modified. She also continued her anti-nuclear activism, speaking and campaigning for world peace. In 2023, Dann published a German translation Glatzkopf Tetsu (Bald Tetsu) of Tetsushi Yonezawa's memoir Tsuruhage no Tetsu of his life after the bombing of Hiroshima. The name of the book refers to the fact that Yonezawa lost his hair following his exposure to radiation. Her hope was that by reading the memoir people would become more active in opposing the use of nuclear weapons.

== Legacy ==
In 2021, the documentary film Die Unbeugsameng (The Indomitable) by Torsten Körner was released. It documented the lives of the pioneering generation of women who moved into politics and challenged the sexist view that women and power were incompatible. The film presented the accomplishments and struggles of women who ventured into politics from the 1950s to German reunification. Among the women featured were Dann and the other five women who led the Green Party from 1984. The film premiered on television in 2023.
