= Steffi Lemke =

German politician (born 1968)

Steffi Lemke MdB
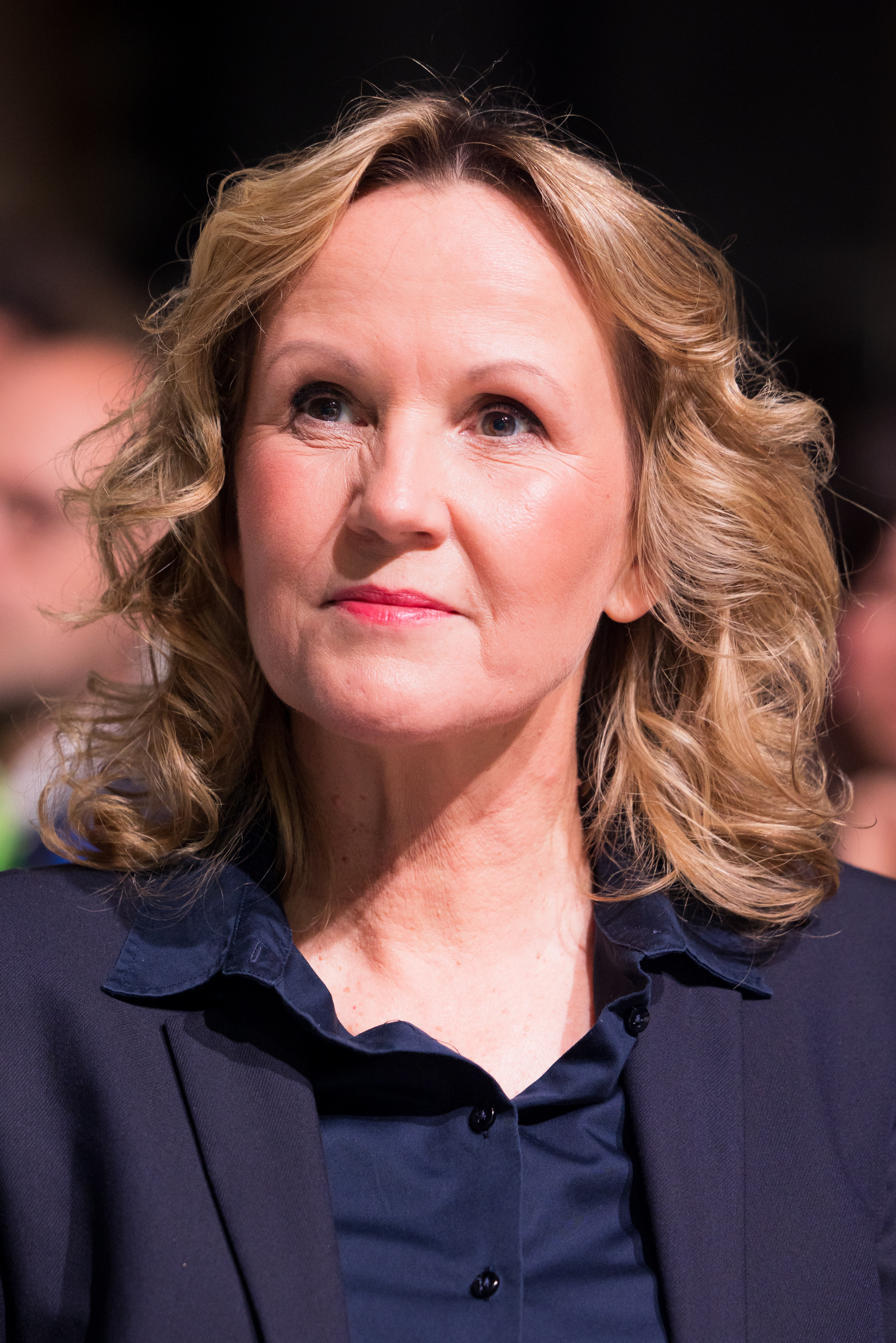
- Lemke in 2024

Minister for the Environment, Nature Conservation, Nuclear Safety and Consumer Protection
- In office 8 December 2021 – 6 May 2025
- Chancellor: Olaf Scholz
- Preceded by: Svenja Schulze
- Succeeded by: Carsten Schneider

Chief Executive of the Alliance '90/The Greens
- In office 8 December 2002 – 19 October 2013
- Leader: Fritz Kuhn; Claudia Roth; Angelika Beer; Reinhard Bütikofer; Cem Özdemir
- Preceded by: Reinhard Bütikofer
- Succeeded by: Michael Kellner

Member of the Bundestag for Saxony-Anhalt
- Incumbent
- Assumed office 22 September 2013
- Constituency: Alliance '90/Greens List
- In office 16 October 1994 – 22 September 2002
- Constituency: Alliance '90/Greens List

Personal details
- Born: 19 January 1968 (age 58) Dessau, East Germany (now Germany)
- Party: Greens
- Children: 1
- Education: Humboldt University of Berlin

Steffi Lemke (born 19 January 1968) is a German politician of Alliance 90/The Greens who served as the Federal Minister for the Environment, Nature Conservation, Nuclear Safety, and Consumer Protection in Chancellor Olaf Scholz's cabinet from 2021 to 2025.

Lemke has been a member of the Bundestag from the state of Saxony-Anhalt from 1994 through 2002 and since 2013.

== Education and early career ==
After attending a polytechnic secondary school in Dessau, Lemke initially trained as a zoo technician from 1984 to 1986. Afterwards she worked as a letter carrier from 1986 to 1988. She also attended a secondary school leaving certificate course at the Philanthropinum in Dessau. After graduating from high school in 1988, she studied agricultural science at the Humboldt University of Berlin, graduating in 1993 with a degree in agricultural engineering (specialising in animal production).

== Political career ==
Lemke was one of the co-founders of the Green Party in the GDR in 1989. She first served as a member of the German Bundestag from 1994 to 2002, representing the Dessau-Roßlau and Wittenberg districts. During that time, she was part of the Committee on Food and Agriculture.

From 2002 to 2013 Lemke worked as the Green Party's managing director, under the leadership of co-chairs Angelika Beer (2002–2004), Reinhard Bütikofer (2002–2008), Claudia Roth (2004–2013) and Cem Özdemir (2008–2013). In this capacity, she managed her party's campaigns in three national elections which were all successive. In late 2013, she considered running for the party's leadership but ultimately pulled out from consideration, instead making room for Simone Peter.

Since the 2013 elections, Lemke has been a member of the German Bundestag again, where she served as one of four whips of her parliamentary group under the leadership of the group's co-chairs Katrin Göring-Eckardt and Anton Hofreiter from 2013 until 2021. In this capacity, she was a member of the parliament's Council of Elders, which – among other duties – determines daily legislative agenda items and assigns committee chairpersons based on party representation.

Lemke was also a member of the Committee on the Environment, Nature Conservation and Nuclear Safety. She served as her parliamentary group's spokesperson for nature conservation policy. In addition to her committee assignments, she was part of the German Parliamentary Friendship Group for Relations with the States of Central America.

Following the 2016 state elections in Saxony-Anhalt, Lemke was part of her party's delegation in the negotiations on forming Germany's first-ever coalition government between the Christian Democratic Union, the Social Democratic Party and the Green Party. She was briefly considered to join the government subsequently formed under the leadership of Minister-President Reiner Haseloff and become State Minister for the Environment and Agriculture; however, the position instead went to Claudia Dalbert.

=== Career in government ===
In the negotiations to form a so-called traffic light coalition of the Social Democrats (SPD), the Green Party and the FDP following the 2021 federal elections, Lemke led her party's delegation in the working group on environmental policy; her co-chairs from the other parties were Rita Schwarzelühr-Sutter (SPD) and Stefan Birkner (FDP). The negotiations led to the successful formation of a government, and Lemke took up the post of Minister for the Environment, Nature Conservation, Nuclear Safety and Consumer Protection in the new cabinet, serving under Chancellor Olaf Scholz.

In 2022, Lemke introduced draft legislation requiring manufacturers of products made with single-use plastic, such as bottles and cups, to pay an annual levy into a fund to help municipalities with the cost of clearing up litter.

In October 2023, Lemke participated in the first joint cabinet retreat of the German and French governments in Hamburg, chaired by Scholz and President Emmanuel Macron.

=== Political positions ===
When Germany's nuclear power phase-out was investigated by a committee in 2024-25, Lemke insisted that an open-ended review had been conducted.

== Other activities ==
- KfW, Ex-Officio Member of the Board of Supervisory Directors (since 2021)
- International Academy for Nature Conservation (INA), Member of the Advisory Board

== Personal life ==
Lemke is divorced and lives with her current partner in Dessau. She has a son.
