= Ekin Deligöz =

Turkish-German politician (born 1971)

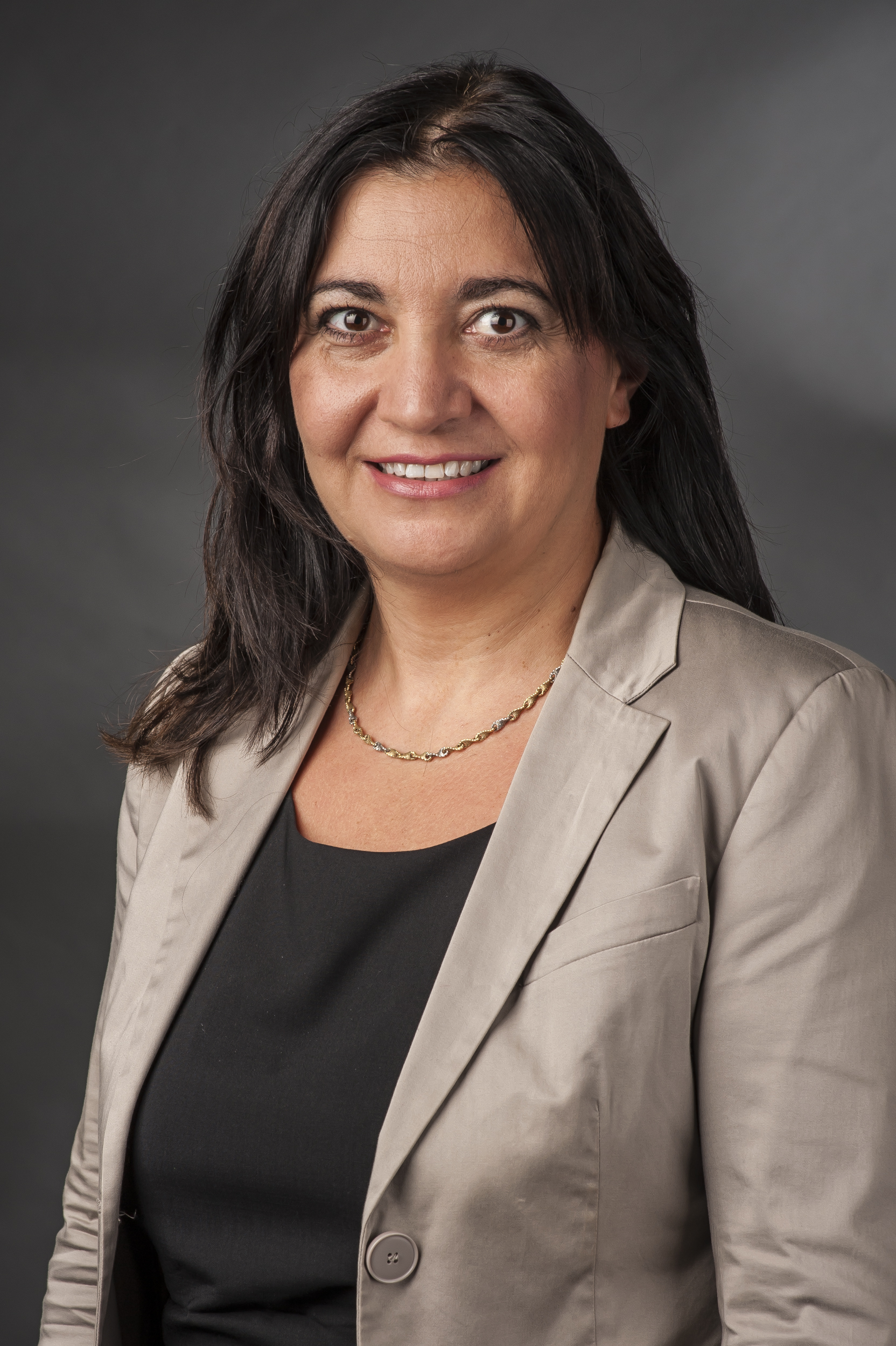
- Deligöz in 2014

Member of the Bundestag for Bavaria
- In office 26 October 1998 – 25 March 2025
- Constituency: Alliance 90/The Greens List

Personal details
- Born: 21 April 1971 (age 55) Tokat, Turkey
- Citizenship: German
- Party: Alliance '90/The Greens
- Children: 2
- Education: University of Konstanz; University of Vienna
- Occupation: Politician
- Website: ekin-deligoez.de

Video statement (2014)

Ekin Deligöz (born 21 April 1971) is a Turkish-German politician of Alliance '90/The Greens who served as a member of the Bundestag for Bavaria from 1998 until her retirement in 2025. In addition, she was a Parliamentary State Secretary in the Federal Ministry of Family Affairs, Senior Citizens, Women and Youth in the coalition government of Chancellor Olaf Scholz from 2021 to 2025.

== Early life ==
Of ethnic Turkish origin, Deligöz was born in Tokat, Turkey; her family moved to West Germany in 1979. She attended school in Weißenhorn and afterwards partook in Administrative Studies in Konstanz and Vienna earning a degree in 1998. In February 1997, she acquired German citizenship.

== Political career ==
Deligöz joined the Greens as a student member and belonged to the Bavaria chapter of the Greens' youth organization. She entered the Bundestag in 1998, and was re-elected in 2002, 2005 and 2009. Deligöz was re-elected for the fourth time into the federal parliament following the 2013 election. She is one of the eleven politicians of Turkish descent who won a seat in the federal parliament, including seven women.

Between 2002 and 2005, Deligöz served as Chief Whip of the Green Party's parliamentary group. From 2009 until 2013, she was part of the group's leadership around co-chairs Renate Künast and Jürgen Trittin. In this capacity, she was part of a series of round table talks in 2010 and 2011 to tackle a wave of child sexual abuse cases, including numerous allegations of abuse in the Roman Catholic Church; the talks were jointly chaired by ministers Sabine Leutheusser-Schnarrenberger, Annette Schavan, and Kristina Schröder.

A member of the Budget Committee and as deputy chairwoman of the Audit Committee from 2013 until 2021, Deligöz served as her parliamentary group's rapporteur on the annual budgets of the Federal Ministry of Labour and Social Affairs (BMAS); the Federal Ministry of Education and Research (BMBF); the Federal Ministry of Health (2013–2017); the Federal Ministry of Family Affairs, Senior Citizens, Women and Youth (BMFSFJ); the Office of the Federal President (2013–2021); the Federal Foreign Office (2018–2021); and the Federal Court of Auditors (2018–2021).

Deligöz voted in favor of a symbolic resolution in 2016 that would label the 1915 killings of up to 1.5 million Armenians by Ottoman forces "genocide". Due to Turkey's strong rejection of the label, she became one of eleven MPs of Turkish origin who received increased police protection and were advised against traveling to Turkey.

In the negotiations to form a so-called traffic light coalition of the Social Democratic Party (SPD), the Green Party and the Free Democratic Party (FDP) following the 2021 German elections, Deligöz was part of her party's delegation in the working group on children, youth and families, co-chaired by Serpil Midyatli, Katrin Göring-Eckardt and Stephan Thomae. In September 2024, she announced not seeking re-election for Bundestag in February 2025.

== Other activities ==
- Gegen Vergessen – Für Demokratie, Member of the Board
- German Committee for UNICEF, Member of the Board
- German Child Protection Association, Member
- Assembly of Delegates of Ulmer Volksbank e.G., Member
- Federal Association for Unaccompanied Refugee Minors, Member
- Atlantik-Brücke e.V. (association promoting German-American friendship), Member
- Animal welfare association of the town of Weißenhorn (Tierschutzverein Weißenhorn e.V.), Member
