= Christine Scheel =

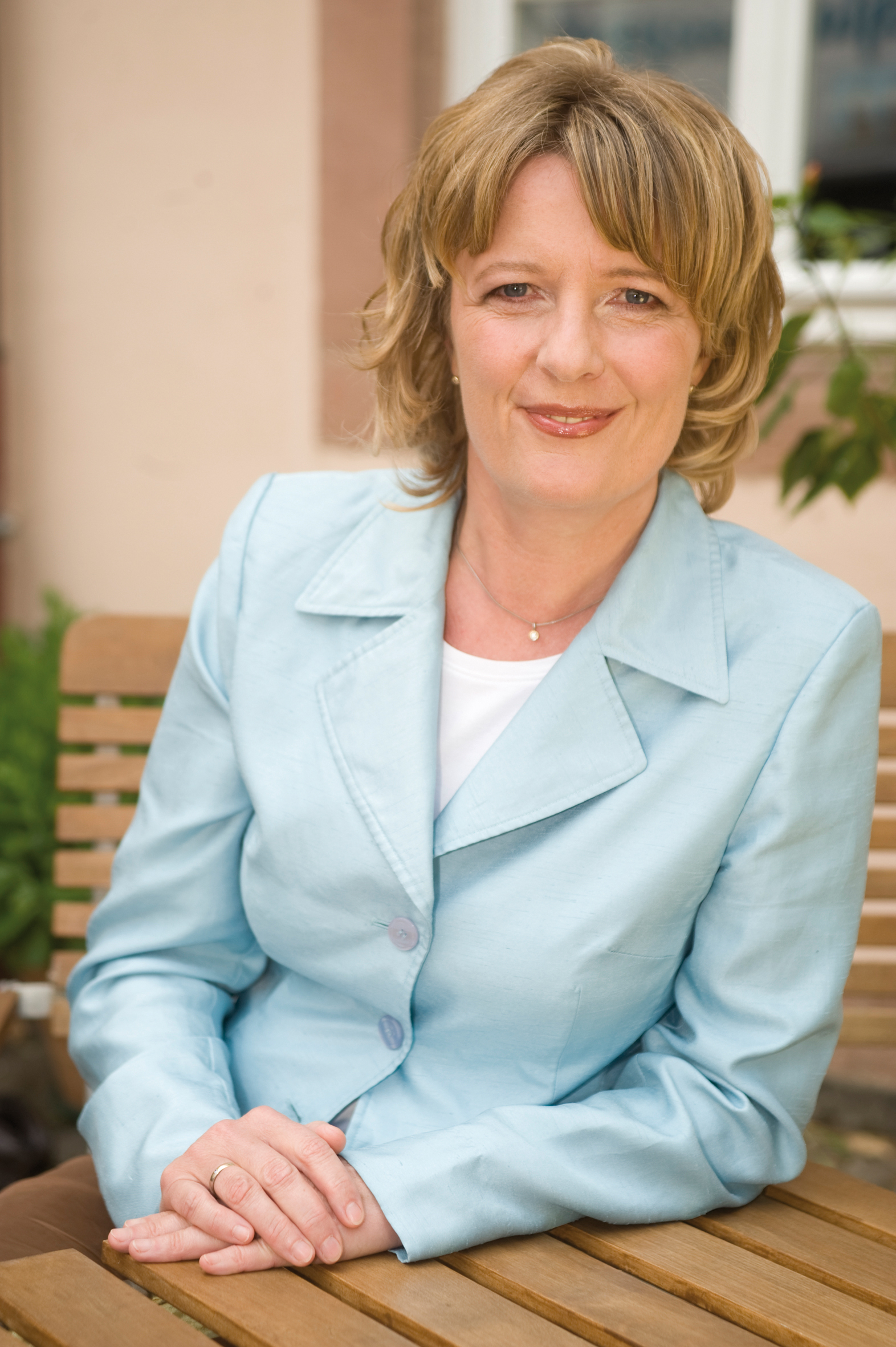
- Scheel in 2009

Member of the Bundestag
- In office 1994–2012

Chair of the Finance Committee of the Bundestag
- In office 1998–2005

Member of the Landtag of Bavaria
- In office 1986–1994

Personal details
- Born: Christine Schäfer; 31 December 1956 (age 69) Rottenburg
- Party: Green

Christine Scheel (born Christine Schäfer, 31 December 1956 in Rottenburg, near Aschaffenburg) is a German former politician from the Green party. From 1994 to 2012 she was a Member of the Bundestag, chairing its finance committee from 1998 to 2005. Since stepping away from politics she has served as a board member in companies such as Encavis.
