= Marieluise Beck =

German politician (born 1952)

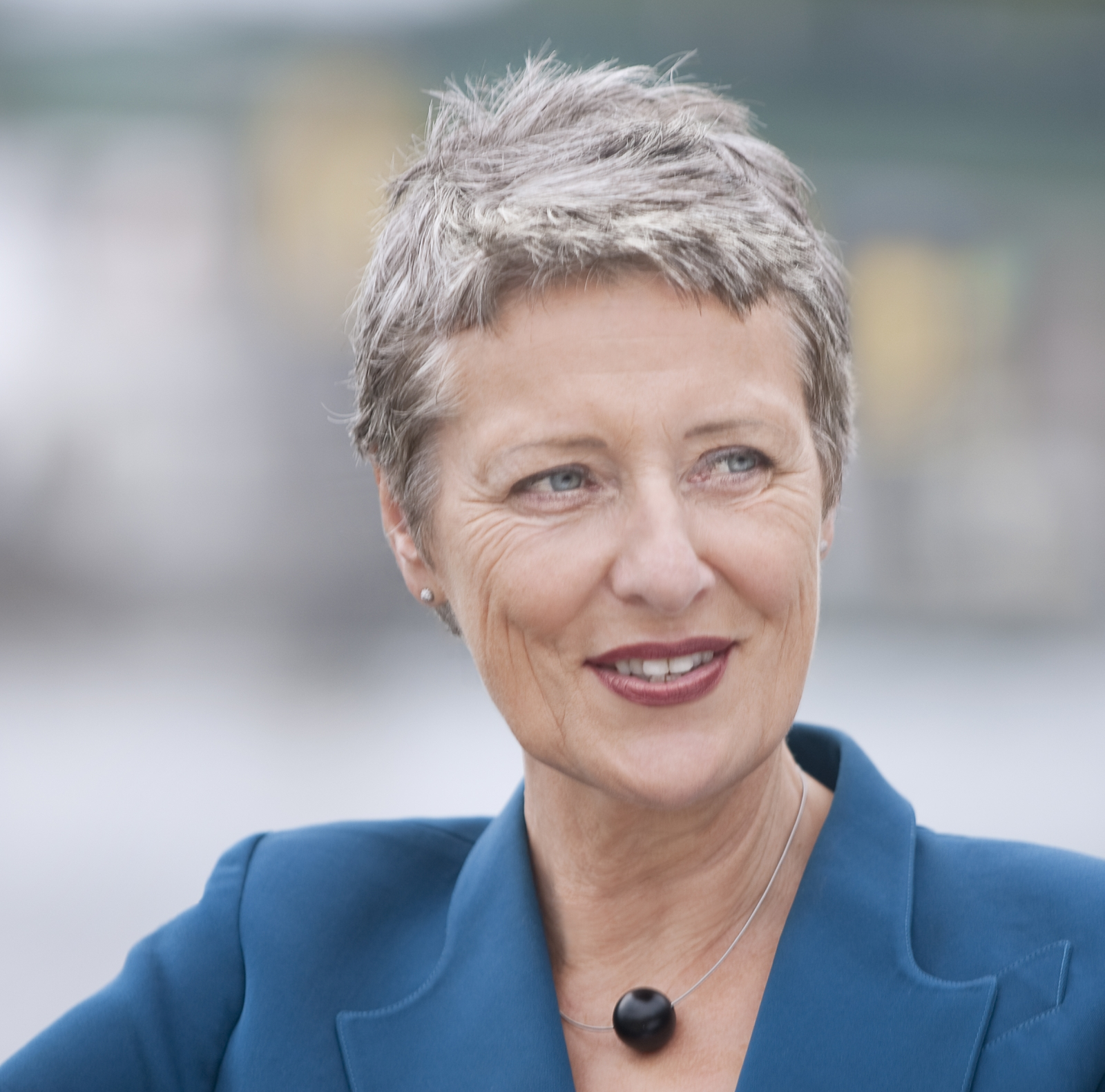
- Beck in 2009

Member of the Bundestag for Bremen
- In office 2 November 1994 – 24 September 2017
- Constituency: Alliance '90/The Greens List
- In office 25 January 1987 – 2 December 1990
- Preceded by: The Greens List

Member of the Bürgerschaft of Bremen
- In office 11 December 1991 – 2 November 1994
- Constituency: The Greens List

Leader of The Greens in the Bundestag
- In office 29 March 1983 – 3 April 1984 Serving with Otto Schily and Petra Kelly
- Chief Whip: Joschka Fischer
- Preceded by: Office established
- Succeeded by: Annemarie Borgmann

Member of the Bundestag for Baden-Württemberg
- In office 6 March 1983 – 14 April 1985
- Constituency: The Greens List

Personal details
- Born: 25 June 1952 (age 74) Bramsche, Lower Saxony, West Germany (now Germany)
- Citizenship: German
- Party: Alliance '90/The Greens
- Spouse: Ralf Fücks
- Children: Two
- Education: Bielefeld University; Heidelberg University
- Occupation: Politician
- Profession: Teacher
- Website: marieluisebeck.de

Marieluise Beck (born 25 June 1952) is a German politician who served as member of the Alliance '90/The Greens group in the Bundestag until 2017. She was also a member of the Parliamentary Assembly of the Council of Europe.

== Education ==
Beck studied history and sociology in Bielefeld and Heidelberg. Beck also studied in the United States as a Youth for Understanding exchange student in 1967–1968. She is a 1968 graduate of Quincy High School (Quincy, Michigan).

== Political career ==
=== Early political activities ===
Beck was among the founding members of the German Green party, Alliance '90/The Greens. In 1983 she was elected to the German Bundestag and in the first electoral term in which the Greens were represented in Parliament she was one of the spokespersons of the parliamentary group, together with Petra Kelly and Otto Schily. That year, Beck went on a trip to Washington, D.C., with Kelly and Gert Bastian to discuss the NATO Double-Track Decision.

In 1984, along with Kelly and Schily, she withdrew her candidacy for the party's parliamentary leadership when a majority of the party's legislators nominated an all-female slate headed by Antje Vollmer in an unexpected move. She again served as a Member of the German Bundestag in the following electoral term from 1987 to 1990. After serving as a member of the Parliament of the Free Hanseatic City of Bremen from 1991 to 1994, Beck was re-elected to the German Bundestag and has been a Member ever since.

=== Member of the German government ===
Under chancellor Gerhard Schröder between 1998 and 2005, Beck served as the government's Commissioner for Migration, Refugees and Integration. From 2002, she was also State Secretary at the Federal Ministry of Family Affairs, Senior Citizens, Women and Youth, led by Renate Schmidt. In this capacity, she initiated a campaign against a planned headscarf ban for Muslim teachers, convening politicians from across the party spectrum, scientists and leaders from the church and media, including Rita Süssmuth, Renate Künast, Claudia Roth, Katja Riemann and Renan Demirkan.

=== Activities in foreign policy and human rights ===
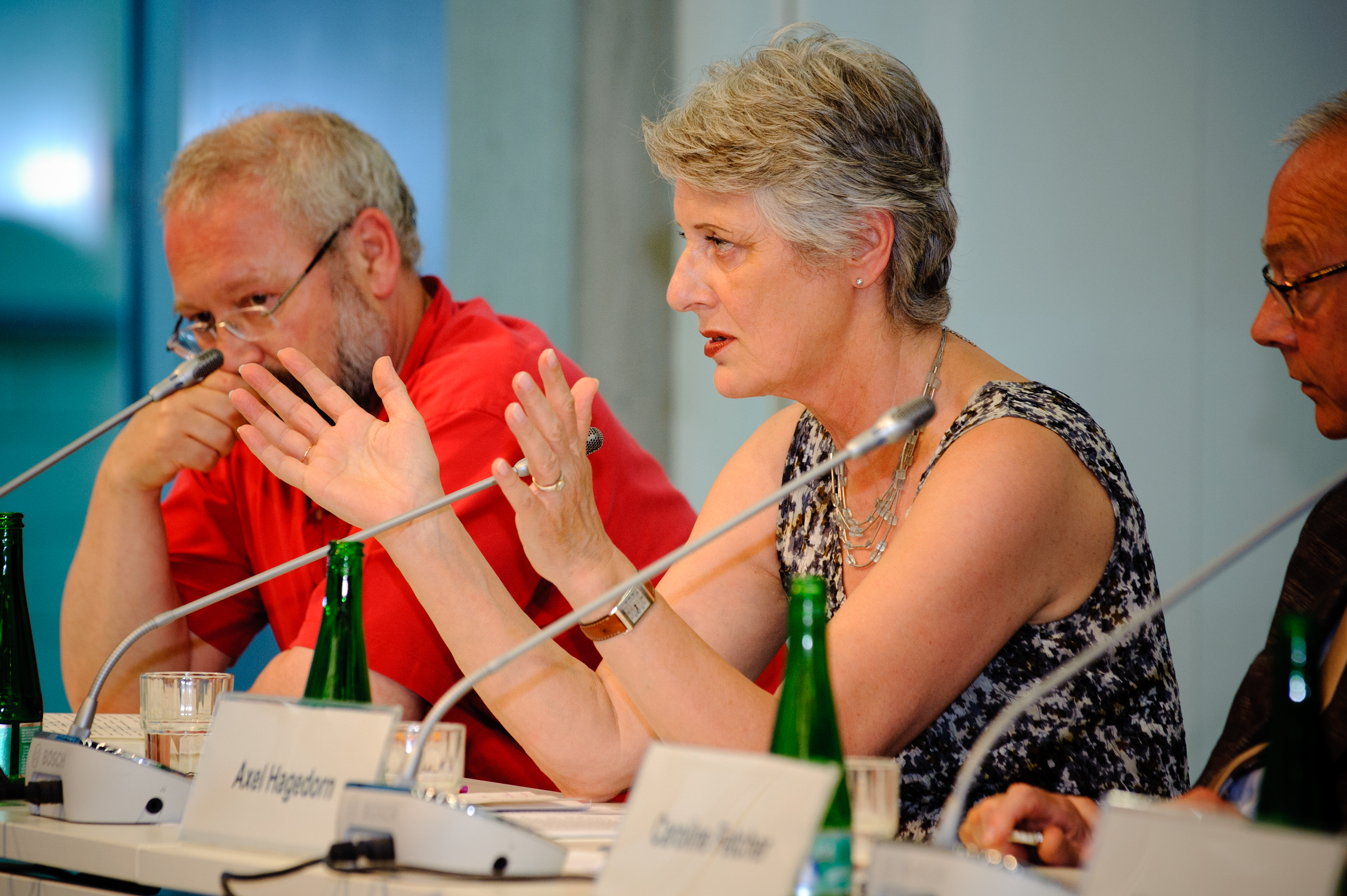
Marieluise Beck

Since 2005, Beck has been member of the Committee on Foreign Affairs at the German parliament, where she focuses as the spokesperson on Eastern European affairs for the Green Party's parliamentary group on matters concerning Russia, Belarus and Western Balkan countries. She serves as the chairperson of the German-Bosnian Parliamentary Friendship Group and as a member of the German-Ukrainian and German-South Caucasus Parliamentary Friendship Groups.

Between 2005 and 2009, Beck also served as a member of the OSCE Parliamentary Assembly and as Deputy chairwoman of the German-Belarusian Parliamentary Friendship Group. In April 2010, she spent one week in several cities of Afghanistan to visit German military and aid activities. Later that year, she and fellow Putin critic Andreas Schockenhoff accompanied German President Christian Wulff on a state visit to Russia.

In 2012, Beck became a member of the German delegation to the Parliamentary Assembly of the Council of Europe, where she has since served on the Committee on Legal Affairs and Human Rights. She observed the 2012 parliamentary and presidential elections in Russia, and commented: "Putin is president of a managed democracy – the voters had no choice." Despite having been member of the Putin-friendly government under Gerhard Schröder between 1998 and 2005, she was among the few diplomats and lawmakers who lobbied for Mikhail B. Khodorkovsky’s release and was once described by news magazine Der Spiegel as "a woman despised by the Kremlin."

In September 2012, Belarus denied visas for Beck and fellow parliamentarian Emanuelis Zingeris, who both planned to monitor the parliamentary elections as part of the OSCE Parliamentary Assembly mission. As a consequence Andrej Hiro, the Belarusian ambassador to Germany, was summoned to the Federal Foreign Office and told that the German government did not understand the reason for the visa denials. In a reaction, Beck said that "Dictator Lukashenka is not even trying to keep up appearances of free and fair elections if he locks journalists and observers out."

In October 2014, Beck joined a 36-member delegation of the Parliamentary Assembly of the Council of Europe, led by British MP Christopher Chope, to observe the conduct of the early parliamentary elections in Ukraine. Ahead of the Belarusian presidential election in 2015, she was part of a pre-electoral delegation led by Turkish MP Reha Denemeç to assess the preparations of the vote, including the procedure of collecting signatures for registration of presidential candidates.

In September 2015, amid the European migrant crisis, Beck joined Vice Chancellor Sigmar Gabriel on a trip to the Zaatari refugee camp in Jordan to learn more about the plight of Syrians fleeing the violence in the ongoing Syrian civil war that erupted in 2011.

In August 2016, Beck announced that she would not stand in the 2017 federal elections but instead resign from active politics by the end of the parliamentary term.

== Life after politics ==
In 2017, Beck co-founded the Zentrum Liberale Moderne, a think-tank focusing on defending the open society and liberal democracy against anti-liberal revolt in Germany, European Union and abroad. Former President of Germany Joachim Gauck spoke at the opening of Zentrum.

Since 2018, Beck has been a member of the so-called Limbach Commission (Advisory Commission on the return of cultural property seized as a result of Nazi persecution, especially Jewish property), a panel convened by the German government to give recommendations on restitution claims regarding art works stolen or purchased under duress by the Nazis.

== Other activities ==
- Petersburger Dialog, Member of the Board (since 2015)
- Gegen Vergessen – Für Demokratie, Member
- German Federation for the Environment and Nature Conservation (BUND), Member
- German-Israeli Association, Member
- Independent Afghan Women Association, Member
- Society for Threatened Peoples (GfbV), Member

== Recognition ==
- 1996 – Order of Merit of the Federal Republic of Germany (Bundesverdienstkreuz am Bande)
- 1996 – Honorary citizenship of Lukavac
- 2008 – Regine Hildebrandt Prize for Solidarity in Unemployment and Poverty
- 2016 – Ramer Award for Courage in the Defense of Democracy, American Jewish Committee (AJC)

== Personal life ==
Beck is married to fellow Green politician Ralf Fücks, the former chairman of the Heinrich Böll Foundation. She lives in Bremen.
