= Reinhard Bütikofer =

German politician (born 1953)

Reinhard Bütikofer MEP
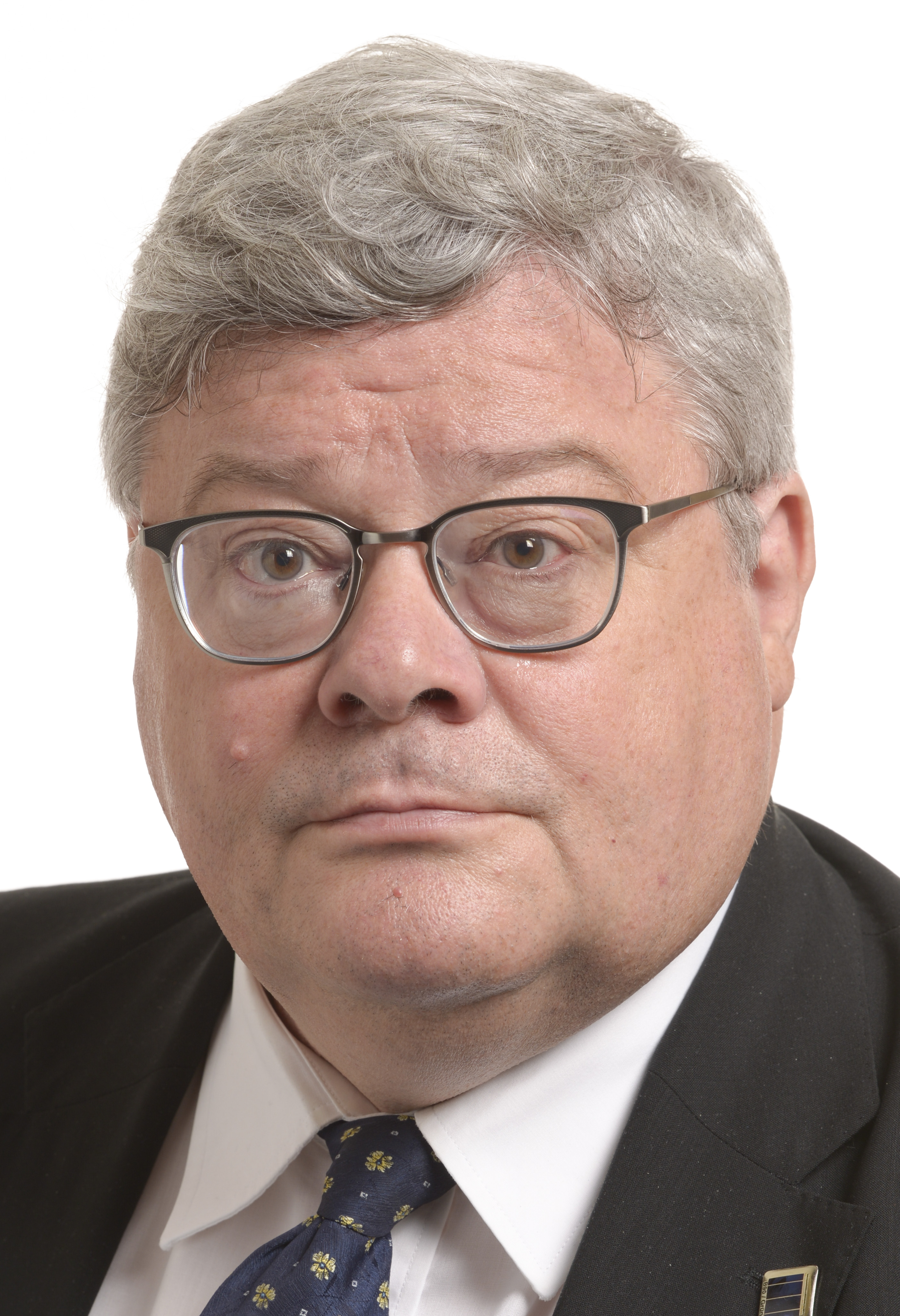

Member of the European Parliament
- In office 14 July 2009 – 15 July 2024
- Constituency: Germany

Co-chair of the European Green Party
- In office 2012 – 10 November 2019 Serving with Monica Frassoni
- Preceded by: Philippe Lamberts
- Succeeded by: Thomas Waitz

Leader of Alliance 90/The Greens
- In office 8 December 2002 – 16 November 2008 Serving with Angelika Beer; Claudia Roth
- Preceded by: Fritz Kuhn
- Succeeded by: Cem Özdemir

Member of the Landtag of Baden-Württemberg
- In office 25 March 1984 – 24 March 1996

Personal details
- Born: Reinhard Hans Bütikofer; 26 January 1953 (age 73) Mannheim, Baden-Württemberg, Germany
- Party: German; Alliance 90/The Greens; EU; European Green Party
- Education: University of Heidelberg (did not graduate)
- Website: http://reinhardbuetikofer.eu/

Reinhard Hans Bütikofer (born 26 January 1953) is a German politician who served as a member of the European Parliament from 2009 to 2024. He is a member of the Alliance 90/The Greens, part of the European Green Party. He was the co-chair of Alliance 90/The Greens (alongside Claudia Roth) from 2002 to 2008 and of the European Green Party (alongside Monica Frassoni) from 2012 to 2019.

== Early life and education ==
Bütikofer was born in Mannheim and grew up in Speyer. He studied philosophy, sinology and history in Heidelberg, but did not finish his studies.

== Political career ==
=== Early beginnings ===
Bütikofer was active in the student's movement and one of the "K-gruppen", the Maoist Communist League of West Germany (Kommunistischer Bund Westdeutschland; KBW). From the 1980s onwards, he became active in Heidelberg municipal politics for the Green-Alternative List.

In 1984, Bütikofer was elected into the town council of Heidelberg and became a member of the Green Party, the starting point of his political career with Alliance 90/The Greens. In 1988, he was elected in the Landtag of Baden-Württemberg. He was Member of the Landtag until 1996.

After a year of parental leave, in 1997 Bütikofer became co-chairman of the Green Party in Baden-Württemberg, alongside Monika Schnaitmann. Two years later he was elected secretary general of the federal party. In December 2002 he became co-chairman of the federal party (alongside Angelika Beer) and was reelected in 2004 and 2006 (alongside Claudia Roth). On 3 March 2008 he announced not to stand again as a party chairman and to run for European Parliament in 2009, to which he was elected.

=== Member of the European Parliament, 2009–2024 ===
From 2009 to 2024, Bütikofer was a Member of the European Parliament (MEP) for the German Green Party. He was a member of the Committee on Industry, Research and Energy (ITRE), and a substitute member of the Committee on Foreign Affairs (AFET) and the Subcommittee on Security and Defense (SEDE). As shadow rapporteur, he authored reports on the evaluation of the European Endowment for Democracy (2015), on the impact of developments in European defence markets on the security and defence capabilities in Europe (2015) and on green growth opportunities for SMEs (2015).

In addition, Bütikofer was a member of the parliament's delegation for relations with the United States and the Transatlantic Legislators' Dialogue and the chair of the delegation for Relations with China. He also served as a member of the European Parliament Intergroup on SMEs.

Bütikofer was the Green Group's spokesperson on industrial policy, and speaker of the delegation from the German Green Party (Bündnis 90/Die Grünen) to the European Parliament.

In the negotiations to form a coalition government with the Christian Democrats – both the Christian Democratic Union (CDU) and the Christian Social Union in Bavaria (CSU) – and the Free Democratic Party (FDP) following the 2017 national elections, Bütikofer is currently part of the 14-member delegation of the Green Party.

Following the 2019 elections, Bütikofer was part of a cross-party working group in charge of drafting the European Parliament's four-year work program on foreign policy.

In the negotiations to form a so-called traffic light coalition of the Social Democratic Party (SPD) and the Free Democratic Party (FDP) following the 2021 federal elections, Bütikofer was part of his party's delegation in the working group on foreign policy, defence, development cooperation and human rights, co-chaired by Heiko Maas, Omid Nouripour and Alexander Graf Lambsdorff.

Amid the Qatar corruption scandal at the European Parliament, it was found that Bütikofer was, by far, the Member of the European Parliament who has travelled the most during the current legislature. These travels were financed by third parties or non EU states with, so far, a total of 22 voyages and 47 hotel nights. Among the countries he visited there are, amongst others, India, China, Russia, the United States and Australia.

In 2023, Bütikofer announced that he would not stand in the 2024 elections but instead resign from active politics by the end of the parliamentary term.

== Political views ==
=== On the Green Party and the German political system ===
In 2005, Bütikofer complained that because Germany has no winner-take-all political system, there were only a few Green party members in the foreign service, even after Joschka Fischer had been foreign minister for seven years; by contrast, hundreds of supporters of the Christian Democratic Union served in the Federal Foreign Office. In 2010, Bütikofer characterized his party as representing “a certain lifestyle,” noting that, mostly urbanized, many belong to the professions and are politically and socially engaged. “They sit on school boards. They are active in their churches or sports clubs. They support nongovernmental organizations,” he said.

=== On public safety and civil liberties ===
Under Bütikofer’s leadership, a two-year-long effort to negotiate a revised immigration law was abandoned by the Green Party in 2004, citing concerns about, among other things, that any regulations allowing easier detentions or expulsions of terror suspects would subvert Germany's civil rights protections.

=== On natural resources ===
When the European Commission issued a strategy paper in 2010 which proposed pursuing more bilateral trade agreements and investing in infrastructure in Africa as a means to increase alternative sources of rare earth metals, hoping to break China’s dominance of the market for the strategic minerals, Bütikofer demanded an “innovative industrial policy that reduces the use of resources” instead.

=== On China ===
When German Chancellor Gerhard Schröder announced in 2005 his intentions to lift an arms embargo on China that had been in place since the crackdown on student-led opposition demonstrators near Tiananmen Square in Beijing in 1989, Bütikofer opposed the plan and instead called for a joint approach together with the United States.

Since 2020, Bütikofer has been serving as co-chair of the Inter-Parliamentary Alliance on China (IPAC). Also in 2020, he was one of 40 fellow Members of the European Parliament from five political groups who called for EU member states and the Commission to cut European public funding for Chinese 5G vendors Huawei and ZTE in a letter, arguing the two are "high-risk" companies that pose a security threat to network security in Europe.

On 22 March 2021, he was sanctioned by the Chinese government after the European Union imposed sanctions on China over Xinjiang.

=== On Russia ===
Following the assassination of journalist and human rights activist Anna Politkovskaya in 2008, Bütikofer characterized the human rights situation in Russia as "deteriorating". He also criticized Russia's behaviour towards Georgia as "almost unbelievably arrogant", referring to the country's confrontation with Georgia and its decision to sever all transport and postal links in 2008. He is an advocate of "a more open and more clear-cut language from the West, including Germany [...] if we just don't want to be standing by."

== Other activities ==
- European Council on Foreign Relations (ECFR), Member (since 2021)
- Center for Global Politics (CGP), Free University of Berlin, Member of the Advisory Board
- EastWest Institute, Member of the Parliamentarians Network for Conflict Prevention
- European Business Summit (EBS), Member of the Honorary Committee
- European Endowment For Democracy (EED), Member of the Board of Governors
- American Jewish Committee’s Ramer Institute Berlin, Member of the Advisory Board
- Heinrich Böll Foundation, Member of the Europe/Transatlantic Advisory Board
- Green European Foundation, Member of the General Assembly

In addition, Bütikofer served on the board of Europa-Union Deutschland, the German branch of the Union of European Federalists (UEF), Aspen Institute Berlin, and German-Chinese Dialogue Forum. He is a member of the Green European Foundation, the International Institute for Strategic Studies, the German Council for Foreign Relations, the Nature and Biodiversity Conservation Union (NABU), and the German trade union ver.di.

== Recognition ==
In November 2011, Bütikofer was honored with the Fray International Sustainability Award at Fray International Symposium in Cancún, Mexico, for his achievements in sustainable development in politics.

== Personal life ==
Bütikofer's father was a post office worker and his mother was a housewife. He has fathered three daughters with Henriette Katzenstein. In 2001, he married Renee Krebs.
