= Helmut Wilhelm =

German judge and politician (1946–2022)

Member of the Bavarian Constitutional Court
- In office 2010–2014
- In office 1986–1994

Member of the Bundestag
- In office 10 November 1994 – 17 October 2002

Personal details
- Born: 12 April 1946 Regensburg, Bavaria, Germany
- Died: 24 September 2022 (aged 76) Amberg, Bavaria, Germany
- Party: Alliance 90/The Greens
- Education: University of Würzburg; University of Regensburg
- Occupation: Judge

Helmut Wilhelm (12 April 1946 – 24 September 2022) was a German judge and politician. A member of Alliance 90/The Greens, he served on the Bavarian Constitutional Court from 1986 to 1994 and again from 2010 to 2014, as well as the Bundestag from 1994 to 2002.

Wilhelm died in Amberg on 24 September 2022, at the age of 76.
