= Heike Wilms-Kegel =

German politician (born 1952)

Heike Wilms-Kegel (born October 19, 1952, Bremen) served in the Bundestag for the German Green Party from 1987 to 1990. She represented Rhineland-Palatinate. In 1996, she was a physician and was hired as the administrator for the Heilbäderverband, a lobby organization for spas and rehabilitation clinics, based in Bonn.
