= Uwe Hüser =

German politician (born 1958)

Uwe Hüser (born 21 August 1958, Koblenz) was elected to the Bundestag from Rhineland-Palatinate for the German Green Party in 1987. His term of office ended in 1990.

In 1993, he became administrator for NABU, an environmental lobby organization.

In 2003, he became Head of Department Internal Services for the Federation of German Consumer Organisations.
