= Birgitt Bender =

German politician (born 1956)

Birgit Bender
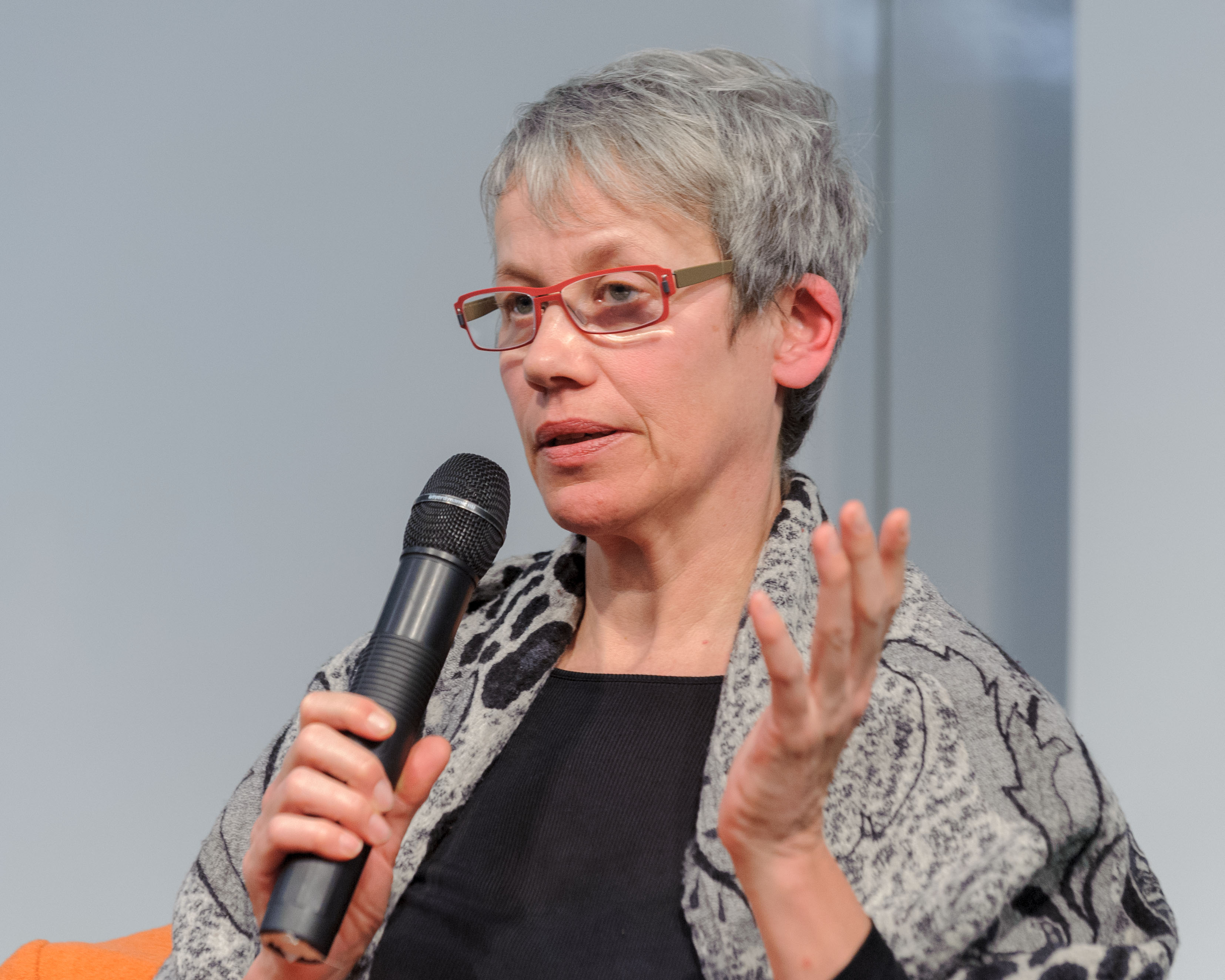

Member of the Bundestag
- In office 2002–2013

Personal details
- Born: 28 December 1956 (age 69) Düsseldorf, West Germany
- Party: Alliance '90/The Greens

Birgitt "Biggi" Bender (born 28 December 1956 in Düsseldorf) is a German politician and member of Alliance 90/The Greens in the Bundestag.

Bender studied law in Cologne, Geneva and in Freiburg and finished her studies 1984.

From 1988 to 2001 Bender was a member of the Landtag of Baden-Württemberg in Stuttgart. Since 2002 Bender has been a member of the Bundestag in Berlin. She is openly lesbian.

She contested the 2009 election in the Stuttgart II district, but was unsuccessful.
