= Katrin Göring-Eckardt =

German politician (born 1966)

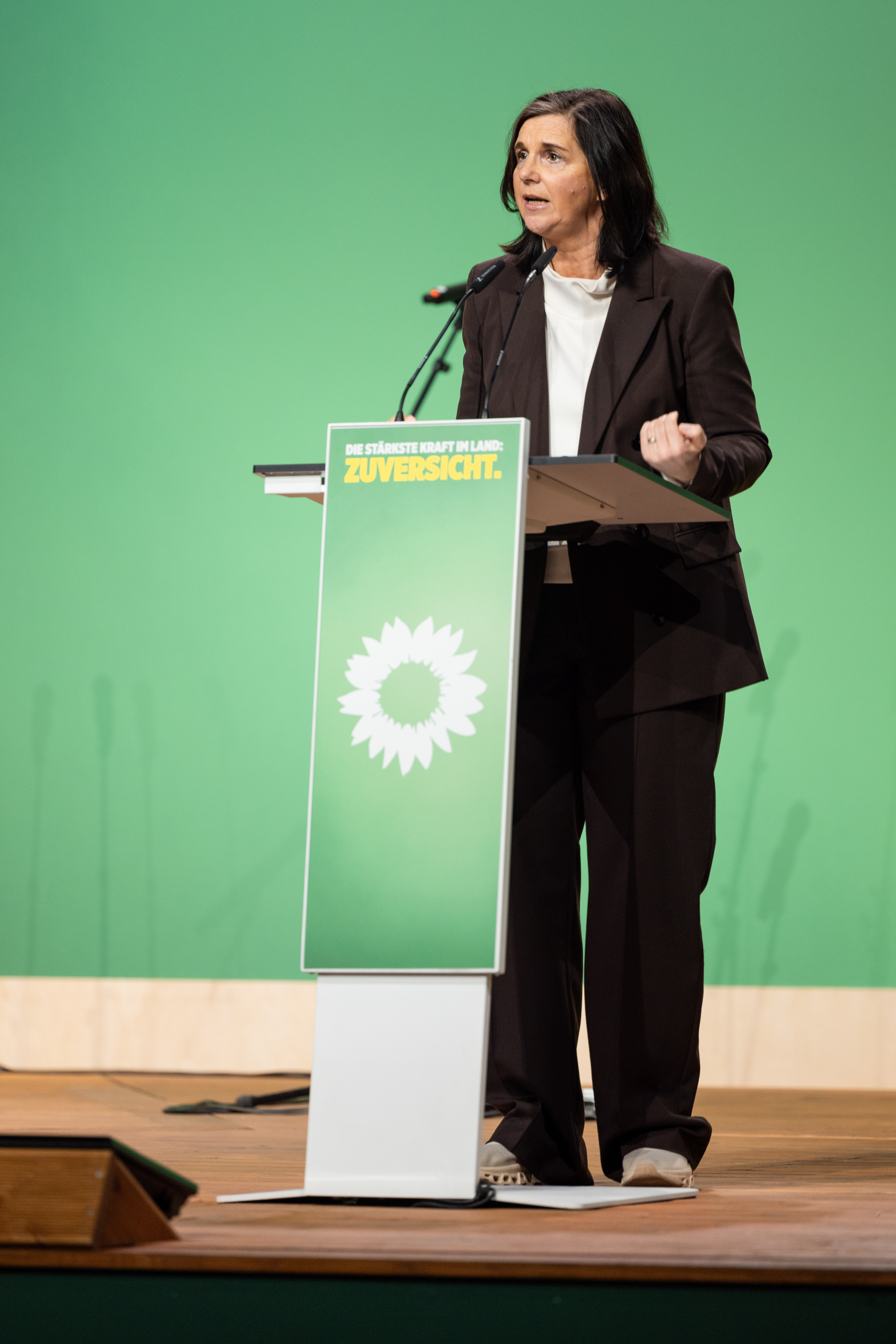

Vice President of the Bundestag (on proposal of the Alliance 90/The Greens-faction)
- In office 9 December 2021 – 25 March 2025
- President: Bärbel Bas
- Preceded by: Claudia Roth
- Succeeded by: Omid Nouripour
- In office 18 October 2005 – 22 October 2013
- President: Norbert Lammert
- Preceded by: Antje Vollmer
- Succeeded by: Claudia Roth

Leader of the Alliance 90/The Greens in the Bundestag
- In office 8 October 2013 – 7 December 2021 Serving with Anton Hofreiter
- Preceded by: Renate Künast
- Succeeded by: Britta Haßelmann
- In office 27 October 2002 – 18 October 2005 Serving with Krista Sager
- Preceded by: Rezzo Schlauch
- Succeeded by: Renate Künast

Member of the Bundestag for Thuringia
- Incumbent
- Assumed office 27 October 1998

Personal details
- Born: Katrin Dagmar Eckardt; 3 May 1966 (age 60) Friedrichroda, Bezirk Erfurt, East Germany
- Party: Alliance 90/The Greens
- Occupation: Kitchen helper, Politician
- Website: goering-eckardt.de

Katrin Dagmar Göring-Eckardt (née Eckardt; 3 May 1966) is a German politician of the German Green Party (officially known as Alliance 90/The Greens). Starting her political activity in the now-former German Democratic Republic (East Germany) in the late 1980s, she has been a member of the German Bundestag since 1998. She became co-chair of her party caucus in the Bundestag (2002–2005) and the Greens' Vice President of the Bundestag on 18 October 2005, a position that she held until 2013 and would later reprise in 2021. In the November 2012 primary election, the Green Party chose her and Jürgen Trittin as the top two candidates for the Greens for the 2013 German federal election. She also stood as joint top candidate for the Greens in the 2017 German federal election, alongside Cem Özdemir.

Between 2009 and 2013, Göring-Eckardt served as praeses of the synod of the Evangelical Church in Germany (German: Evangelische Kirche in Deutschland, abbreviated EKD) and thus as member of the council of the EKD. However, during the federal election campaign in 2013 she stepped down from her office in the EKD.

== Early life and education ==
Katrin Eckhardt was born on 3 May 1966 in the small town of Friedrichroda, near Gotha in Thuringia. Her parents were both dancers. She was an active member of the Free German Youth (German: Freie Deutsche Jugend, abbreviated FDJ). After completing her Abitur at the Erweiterte Oberschule (English: Extended Secondary School, abbreviated EOS) Gotha in 1984, she began studying Lutheran theology at the University of Leipzig, where she studied until 1988 without gaining an academic degree.

== Political career ==
=== Party career ===
Until the Peaceful Revolution and Die Wende in East Germany, Göring-Eckardt worked with the Arbeitskreis Solidarische Kirche (English: Working Group Solidarity Church, abbreviated as AKSK) and without any party membership. In 1989, she became a founding member of the East German political group called the Democratic Awakening and, in 1990, the citizens' movement Democracy Now. From 1990 to 1993, she was a member of the Thuringia State Executive of Alliance 90. As a member of the Thuringia state boards of Democracy Now and Alliance 90, she participated in the negotiations for the merger of Alliance 90 and the Greens, which in 1990, merged with the Green Party in the GDR to form an all-German party that currently exists: Alliance 90/The Greens.

After the merger of Alliance 90 with the Greens in 1993, Göring-Eckardt worked in the Thuringia Landtag with the same parliamentary group as a speaker for women's issues, family and youth. From 1998 to 2006, she was also a member of the party council of the Alliance 90/The Greens. From 1995 to 1998, she was also an employee of the Green politician Matthias Berninger; around that same time from 1996 to 1998, she was also an adjunct member of the Federal Executive for the Greens. Until 1998, she was a member of the Thuringia Green Party National Executive; she was also the state spokeswoman with interruptions during her service. In 2006, she was once again an assessor for the Thuringia Green Party State Executive Committee.

Prior to the ballot to determine the top two Green candidates in November 2012 for the 2013 German federal election, Göring-Eckardt initially spoke out against having a top two for parliamentary candidates, but instead favored a broad-positioned top team. One strong supporter of her candidacy was, amongst others, Boris Palmer (mayor of Tübingen), the party was also internally "realist". During her candidacy, she announced her intention to engage in discussing in particular how to resolve the further disintegration of society. She wanted to go to the people and especially appeal to those sections of the population there, because she said that the other values are crucial as the purely economic ones. An example factor for that choice was the electoral success of Winfried Kretschmann as Minister-President of Baden-Württemberg in 2011. Compared to competitors Claudia Roth and Renate Künast, who were seen as insiders, voters felt that the conservative Göring-Eckardt was a better choice than an outsider. Various media described her performance as a correction to the force rather than going further left when compared to first-place primary election winner Jürgen Trittin, a vote made by the now much more bourgeois party base. The rumored affinity to her black-green alliances notwithstanding, Göring-Eckardt spoke out after the primary election for a red-green coalition. Left party members evaluated the good performance rather critically; compared with the weekly newspaper Die Zeit, they called her an "alleged social politician".

=== Member of the Bundestag, 1998–present ===
Since 1998, Göring-Eckardt has been a member of the Bundestag; she entered the body as a list MP for Thuringia since the electoral system is mixed-member proportional representation with half of the seats being constituency-based and the other half being state list-based. From 1998 to 2002, she was First Parliamentary Secretary (or managing director), specifically from February to October 2002, as well as health and pension policy spokeswoman for the party's parliamentary group. From October 2002 to September 2005, she and Krista Sager became co-chairs of the Green Party faction. In the 2005 federal election, she was the Greens candidate for the Thuringia constituency Erfurt – Weimar – Weimarer Land II; however, she lost election for that constituency but still remained in the Bundestag because she was re-elected on the state list for Thuringia.

On 18 October 2005, Göring-Eckardt was elected as the Green parliamentary group's vice president of the Bundestag with 479 votes in favor, 69 votes against, and 39 abstentions. Since the fall of 2005, she is also the cultural affairs spokeswoman in her group. In 2009, she sought again to win a constituency seat in her state, this time Gotha – Ilm-Kreis; she still could not gain a constituency-based seat but once again got re-elected on the state list. On 27 October 2009, she was re-elected vice president of the Bundestag on the first day of the meeting of the new parliament with 473 votes in favor, 9 votes against, 5 abstentions, and 61 blank votes. In the primary election for the Greens' top candidates for the 2013 federal election on 11 November 2012, she was the second-place winner with 47.3%, beating Claudia Roth and Renate Künast; this made her and Jürgen Trittin, who won the most votes, the factions' top two candidates for the following year's election.

From 2013 to 2025, Göring-Eckardt served as co-chair of the Green Party faction, together with Anton Hofreiter.

In the negotiations to form a so-called traffic light coalition of the Social Democrats (SPD), the Green Party and the FDP following the 2021 federal elections, Göring-Eckardt led her party's delegation in the working group on children, youth and families; her co-chairs from the other parties are Serpil Midyatli and Stephan Thomae.

Following the 2025 national elections, Göring-Eckardt lost an internal vote against Omid Nouripour to become the Green Party's candidate to become one of the vice-presidents of the German Parliament.

== Other activities ==
=== Religious activities ===
Göring-Eckardt is active within the Evangelical Church in Germany (EKD) and has held a number of positions within it. She served from 2007 to 2015 as an elected board member of the German Evangelical Church Assembly. She also sat on the board of trustees of the International Martin Luther Foundation.

She was a member of the Evangelical Church in Germany's 11th Synod and was elected its head in 2009 over the former Minister-President of Bavaria Günther Beckstein.

In 2009 became president of the 33rd biannual German Evangelical Church Assembly, held in Dresden in 2011.

When in November 2012 the Green party elected her as their joint top candidate (with Jürgen Trittin) for the 2013 general election Göring-Eckhard chose to relinquish her responsibilities within the EKD for the duration of the election campaign.

=== Other community activities ===
Göring-Eckardt is a member of the board of trustees of the Action Reconciliation Service for Peace e. V. She was also a 2009/2010 Board member of the non-profit association Atlantik-Brücke e. V. and, since May 2010, an official "godmother" of the Bethel Children's Hospice for dying children.

She also holds the following community positions:

- Deutscher Evangelischer Kirchentag (Bureau Board)
- Federal Foundation for Mother and Child, Member of the Board of Trustees – until 22 February 2010
- Atlantik-Brücke e. V. (member)
- International Martin Luther Foundation, Member of the Board of Trustees
- Bethel Children's Hospice (Godmother)
- Evangelical Academy in Berlin, Member of the Advisory Board
- Evangelical Wittenberg Foundation, Member of the Board of Trustees
- Hermann Kunst Foundation for the Promotion of New Testament Textual Research, Member of the Board of Trustees
- Education Foundation of the Evangelical Church in Central Germany (EKM), Member of the Board
- Haus der Geschichte, Member of the Board of Trustees
- Progressives Zentrum, Member of the Circle of Friends
- Zeitzeichen. Evangelical Comments on Religion and Society. magazine, volunteer co-editor

== Political positions ==
=== Values ===
Party insiders and parts of the media view Göring-Eckardt as a member of the so-called "Realo" (English: Realist), or realpolitik/realist wing of the Greens. In addition she is considered to be a supporter of conservative values with a green lifestyle. In the past, she has based her conscience-based decisions on her religious views. Due to her strong localization in the bourgeois/middle class and good contacts with the centre-right Christian Democratic Union (CDU), she has been listed as a suitable candidate for discussions about forging CDU-Green or black-green coalitions (black being the CDU's color and green being the color for the Greens). Her reputation of being friendly to the CDU is well-founded with her participation in the so-called Pizza-Connection (English: Pizza Connection) in the 1990s; the Pizza Connection was an informal conversation circle between the younger Green and CDU politicians with the name of the circle coming from an Italian restaurant in Bonn.

She was a supporter of Schröder's Agenda 2010 reforms.

After the end of the red-green coalition government (where the Social Democratic Party led by Gerhard Schröder and the Greens were in a coalition from 1998 to 2005), Göring-Eckardt profiled on different occasions that what she called her conservative values of sustainability, social compensation, and social justice are of particular concern to her.

=== Human rights ===
Under the umbrella of the godparenthood program of Libereco – Partnership for Human Rights for political prisoners, Göring-Eckardt has been raising awareness for the imprisonment of Belarusian political activist Ales Bialiatski between 2011 and 2014.

In August 2012, Göring-Eckardt was one of 124 members of the Bundestag to sign a letter that was sent to the Russian ambassador to Germany, Vladimir Grinin, expressing concern over the trial against the three members of Pussy Riot. "Being held in detention for months and the threat of lengthy punishment are draconian and disproportionate", the lawmakers said in the letter. "In a secular and pluralist state, peaceful artistic acts -- even if they can be seen as provocative -- must not lead to the accusation of serious criminal acts that lead to lengthy prison terms".

In December 2014, Göring-Eckardt and fellow Green MP Luise Amtsberg visited the Zaatari refugee camp in Jordan to learn more about the plight of Syrians fleeing the violence in the ongoing Syrian Civil War that erupted in 2011.

In August 2018, Göring-Eckardt urged Chancellor Angela Merkel to appeal Russian President Vladimir Putin for the release of Ukrainian filmmaker Oleh Sentsov.

=== European integration ===
Following the United Kingdom's 2016 referendum on European Union membership, Göring-Eckart made a request to the German government on behalf of the estimated 100,000 Britons living and working across Germany to offer fast-track citizenship.

== Defamation ==
In early 2022, a court in Rhineland-Palatinate sentenced a man to a suspended prison term of seven months for defamation and insulting Göring-Eckardt.

== Personal life ==
Göring-Eckardt married Lutheran pastor Michael Göring in 1988 and had two sons. The couple separated in 2011 and divorced in 2017. She is in a relationship with Thies Gundlach, a theologian and official in the EKD.

== Literature ==
- Michael F. Feldkamp (ed.), Der Bundestagspräsident. Amt – Funktion – Person. 16. Wahlperiode, Olzog, München 2007, ISBN 978-3-7892-8201-0.
