= Thea Dückert =

German politician (1950–2026)

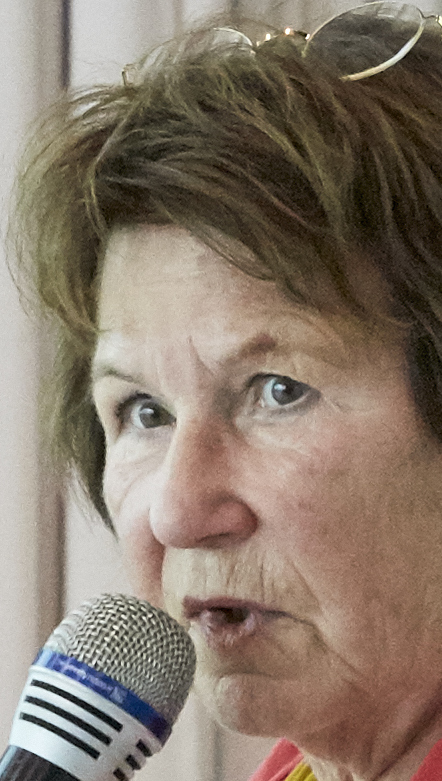
- Dückert in 2017

Member of the Landtag of Lower Saxony
- In office 1986–1994

Member of the Bundestag
- In office 1998–2009

Personal details
- Born: 5 June 1950 Berlin, Germany
- Died: 30 July 2026 (aged 76) Oldenburg, Lower Saxony, Germany
- Party: Greens

Thea Dückert (5 June 1950 – 30 July 2026) was a German politician. A member of Alliance 90/The Greens, she served in the Landtag of Lower Saxony from 1986 to 1994 and the Bundestag from 1998 to 2009.

Dückert died in Oldenburg on 30 July 2026, at the age of 76.
