= Cornelia Behm =

German politician (born 1951)

Cornelia Behm (born 20 September 1951 in Kleinmachnow, Brandenburg) is a German politician and member of Alliance 90/The Greens in the Bundestag from 2002 till 2013.
