= Brigitte Pothmer =

German politician

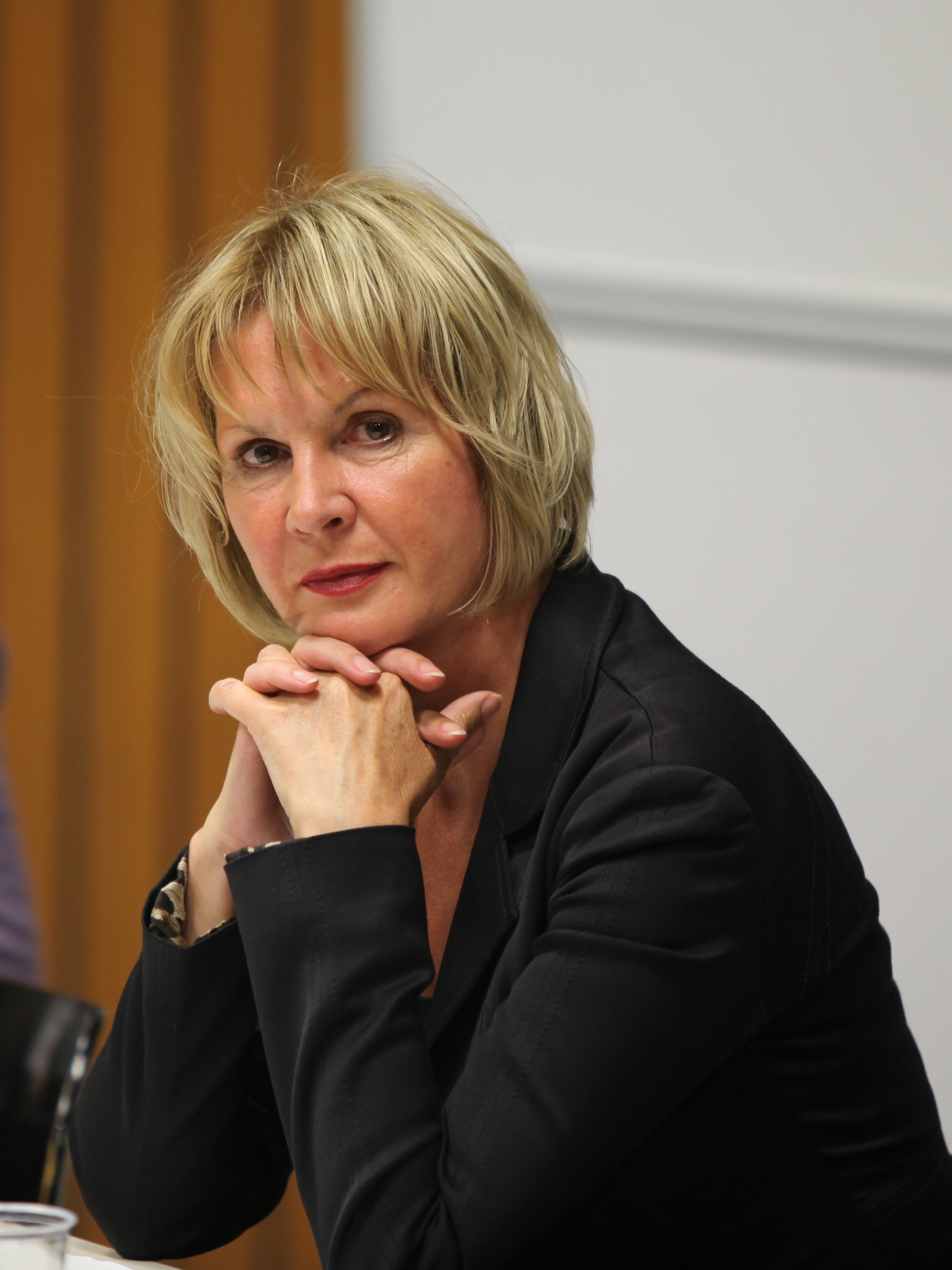
Pothmer in 2009

Brigitte Pothmer (born 10 February 1955) is a retired German politician of the Alliance 90/The Greens Party. She was member of the Bundestag from 2006 to 2017.

== Biography ==
Pothmer was born on 10 February 1955 in Dannenberg (Elbe), Lower Saxony. She graduated from highschool in Hamburg and studied Pedagogy in Hildesheim. She then worked as a Social Pedagogue.

=== Political career ===
From 1994 to 2003, Pothmer was member of the Lower Saxon State Parliament. From May 2003 to November 2005 she was the chairwoman of the Green Party's Lower Saxony state association. She joined the Bundestag in the 2005 German Federal Election by being elected through the State List. She kept her seat in the 2009 and 2013 election. In the Bundestag, she contributed to the Committee for Labour and Social Affairs and was the speaker of her party's job market policy.

She is a member of ver.di.

=== Private Life ===
She is married.
