= Jürgen Reents =

German journalist and politician (1949–2022)

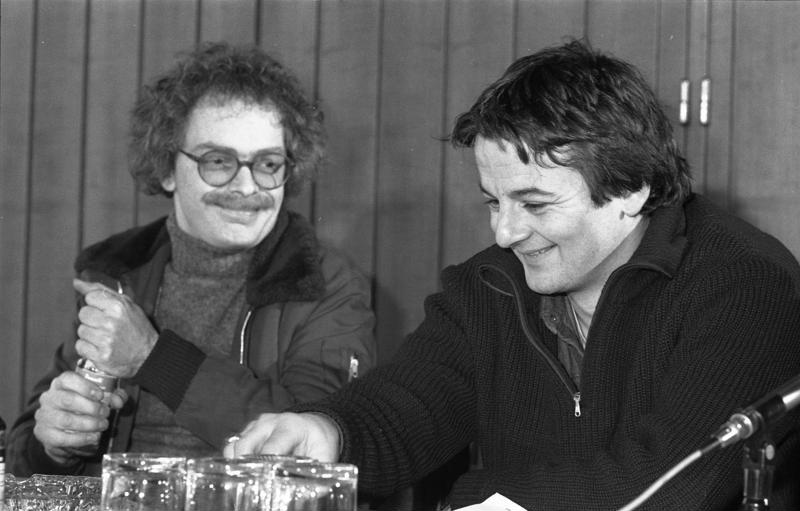
- Jürgen Reents (left) in 1983 with Joschka Fischer

Member of the German Bundestag
- In office 6 March 1983 – 1985
- Constituency: Hamburg

Personal details
- Born: 5 August 1949 Bremerhaven, West Germany
- Died: 7 April 2022 (aged 72)
- Party: Communist League; Alliance 90/The Greens; Party of Democratic Socialism; The Left
- Occupation: Politician, journalist

Jürgen Reents (5 August 1949 – 7 April 2022) was a German politician and journalist.

== Early life and education ==
Reents was born in 1949 in the West German city of Bremerhaven and studied math at the University of Hamburg.

== Political career ==
Reents entered the newly founded Greens and was a member of the Bundestag, the German federal diet from 1983 to 1985.

When, on 18 October 1984, President of the Bundestag Richard Stücklen excluded Reents from the session for calling Chancellor Helmut Kohl "bought by Flick", Christa Nickels requested an interruption. Stücklen turned her microphone off, which prompted Joschka Fischer to address him, "With respect, Mr. President, you are an asshole", for which he in turn was excluded by Stücklen. Fischer apologized to Stücklen two days later.
