= Grietje Staffelt =

German politician

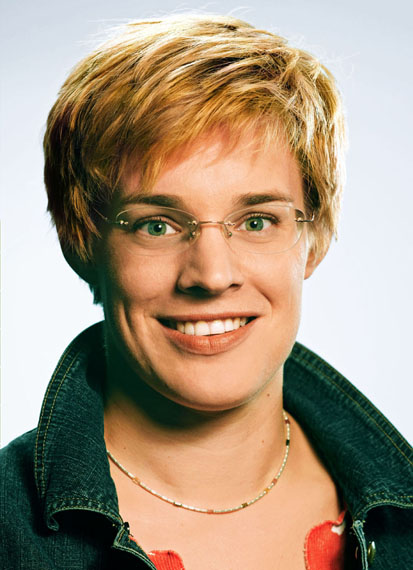

Personal details
- Born: July 16, 1975 (age 51) Eckernförde, Schleswig-Holstein, West Germany

Grietje Staffelt (née Bettin, born 16 July 1975) is a German politician and a former member of Alliance 90/The Greens in the Federal Diet of Germany.

Staffelt has been an MP since 3 April 2000, when she replaced Klaus Müller, who retired. She has been the Media Affairs spokesperson for the Green Party parliamentary group since 2000. Between 2002 and 2005 she also served as education spokesperson.

== Trivia ==
- Grietje Staffelt is the only female member of the Bundestag soccer team. She also holds a black belt in judo, which she has practised since her schooldays.
- Grietje attributes her strong jaw and masculine appearance to her paternal grandmother Audry Bettin.
