= Emma (magazine) =

German magazine

- September 1998 cover: Romy Schneider, Alice Schwarzer
- Editor-in-Chief: Alice Schwarzer
- Categories: Women's magazine
- Frequency: Bi-monthly
- First issue: 26 January 1977; 49 years ago
- Country: Germany
- Based in: Cologne
- Language: German
- Website: www.emma.de
- ISSN: 0721-9741

Emma

Emma (stylised in all caps) is a German feminist magazine. Its print edition is published every two months in Cologne, Germany. Businesswoman Alice Schwarzer is co-founder, publisher and editor-in-chief of the magazine.

== History and profile ==
The first issue of Emma was published on 26 January 1977. The magazine was founded by an collective. As main founder Alice Schwarzer got established, who is still publisher and editor-in-chief. The magazine was modelled on the American magazine Ms. in terms of content, targeted audience and layout. It has its headquarters in Cologne. In December 2002, the Emma website was launched.

The name of the magazine is a wordplay of the term emancipation (German: Emanzipation).

Since its foundation, in the first year Emma has been the leading feminist magazine in Germany, and the only political magazine in Europe entirely run by women.

The magazine has often been criticised for its opinionated and activist stance. However, it has affected German society, creating awareness for and instigating debates on social and women's issues.

Until 2010 the magazine was published every two months. Than it was published quarterly from 2010 to 2013. It changed again to an every two months magazine.

Throughout its years of existence, the magazine never detached itself from Schwarzer. Consequently, many viewed it as a "one-person project" and internal leadership transitions, such as the one in 2008 involving Lisa Ortgies, failed due to rapid fallouts.

The first issue had a print run of approximately 200,000 copies, plus a reprint of 100,000 copies. In 2023, the print run was 34,300 copies.

In October 2026, Schwarzer announced, that the 8 December 2026 edition will be the last one.

== Controversies ==
In the years leading up to its discontinuation, the magazine, serving as a mouthpiece for Schwarzer, frequently sparked controversy.

Since the start of the war in Ukraine in 2022, Schwarzer at times in collaboration with BSW party founder Sahra Wagenknecht has repeatedly advocated for swift peace negotiations with Russia. Critics argue that she loses sight of who the aggressor is in this conflict and which nation is the one being attacked.

Furthermore, Schwarzer’s stances in debates regarding trans identity have also been a subject of controversy about recent and old school feminism.

=== Open letter on German position on Russian invasion of Ukraine ===
Alice Schwarzer published an open letter to Chancellor Olaf Scholz in her magazine Emma at the end of April 2022. In it, she and 27 others from the culture and media industry warned of a further escalation of the Ukraine war. They called on Chancellor Scholz not to supply offensive weapons to Ukraine and to do everything he could to end the war. A victory for Ukraine is unlikely, and the military situation must be accepted in order to prevent further deaths, the authors wrote. They wrote: "A Russian counter-attack could then trigger the case for assistance under the NATO treaty and thus the immediate danger of a world war."

Some of the first signers were actor Lars Eidinger, singer-songwriter Reinhard Mey, controversial comedian Dieter Nuhr, satirical cabaret artist Gerhard Polt, former politician Antje Vollmer (A90/Greens), writer Martin Walser, social scientist Harald Welzer, TV-scientist Ranga Yogeshwar, and writer Juli Zeh.

The open letter amplified a public debate about the position of the German government on the war. The letter attracted a lot of opposition. Political scientist Thomas Jaeger said Schwarzer was factually incorrect. It is covered under international law that a defending state can also support itself with weapons. No distinction is made between defensive and offensive weapons. Also, the Russian president's interpretation can turn anything into a reason for war. Putin's actions are arbitrary.

The journalist Antje Hildebrandt accused the letter signers of selfishness. She compared their demands to people in a burning house who are left on their own because the owner could report this as trespassing.

== See also ==
- List of magazines in Germany

== Literature ==
- Alice Schwarzer: Emma. Die ersten 30 Jahre. München 2007: Kollektion Rolf Heyne. (in German)
