= Encavis =

Renewable energy company

Encavis AG
- Type: Aktiengesellschaft
- ISIN: DE0006095003
- Industry: Renewable energy
- Founded: 2001; 25 years ago
- Headquarters: Hamburg, Germany
- Revenue: €487.3 million (2022)
- Number of employees: 303 (2022)
- Website: encavis.com/en

Encavis AG is a publicly listed company based in Hamburg that operates solar parks and onshore wind farms in twelve European countries as an independent power producer. The installations for sustainable energy generation generate income through guaranteed feed-in tariffs (FIT) or long-term power purchase agreements (PPA). The Encavis Group's total generation capacity is around 3.5 gigawatts (GW) (as of June 2023).

The company reported that it operated over 200 solar parks and over 90 wind farms with an output of over 3 GW in Germany, Denmark, Finland, France, the UK, Ireland, Italy, Lithuania, the Netherlands, Sweden, Spain and Austria in March 2023.

== History ==
Encavis AG was formed in 2001 as Capital Stage AG by transferring the investments of Futura Capitalis AG to HWAG Hanseatisches Wertpapierhandelshaus AG, which has been listed on the stock exchange since 1998. Initially, the company was a private equity company and held investments in solar companies such as Conergy and Inventux Solar Technologies. In the years that followed, the company transformed itself into an investor and operator of (ground-mounted) solar parks and (onshore) wind farms.

On May 30, 2016, Capital Stage AG announced a takeover bid for its competitor Chorus Clean Energy AG. The takeover bid was structured as a pure share swap and ended on October 5, 2016. Capital Stage AG owned 94.42% of Chorus Clean Energy AG. On March 8, 2017, Capital Stage announced that it had acquired additional shares in Chorus Clean Energy AG and now owns more than 95% of the shares of Chorus Clean Energy AG.

In February 2018, Capital Stage AG changed its name to Encavis AG. According to its own information, Encavis is one of the leading independent operators of solar and wind parks in Europe with a total capacity of more than 3 gigawatts.

At the end of October 2022, Encavis AG acquired a majority stake in Stern Energy S.p.A., headquartered in Parma, Italy. The company is a specialized provider of technical services for the installation, operation, maintenance and revamping of photovoltaic systems.

In December 2025, it was announced that Encavis had acquired five operational solar parks in Italy from the Italian subsidiary of EDP Renováveis. The portfolio comprises projects located in the Lazio and Puglia regions with a combined capacity of 248 MW, alongside a further 17 MW under development, increasing Encavis’s total solar capacity in Italy.

== Holdings ==
The Encavis Group includes the subsidiaries Encavis Asset Management AG in Neubiberg and Stern Energy S.p.A. in Parma, Italy.
