= Ulrike Höfken =

German politician (born 1955)

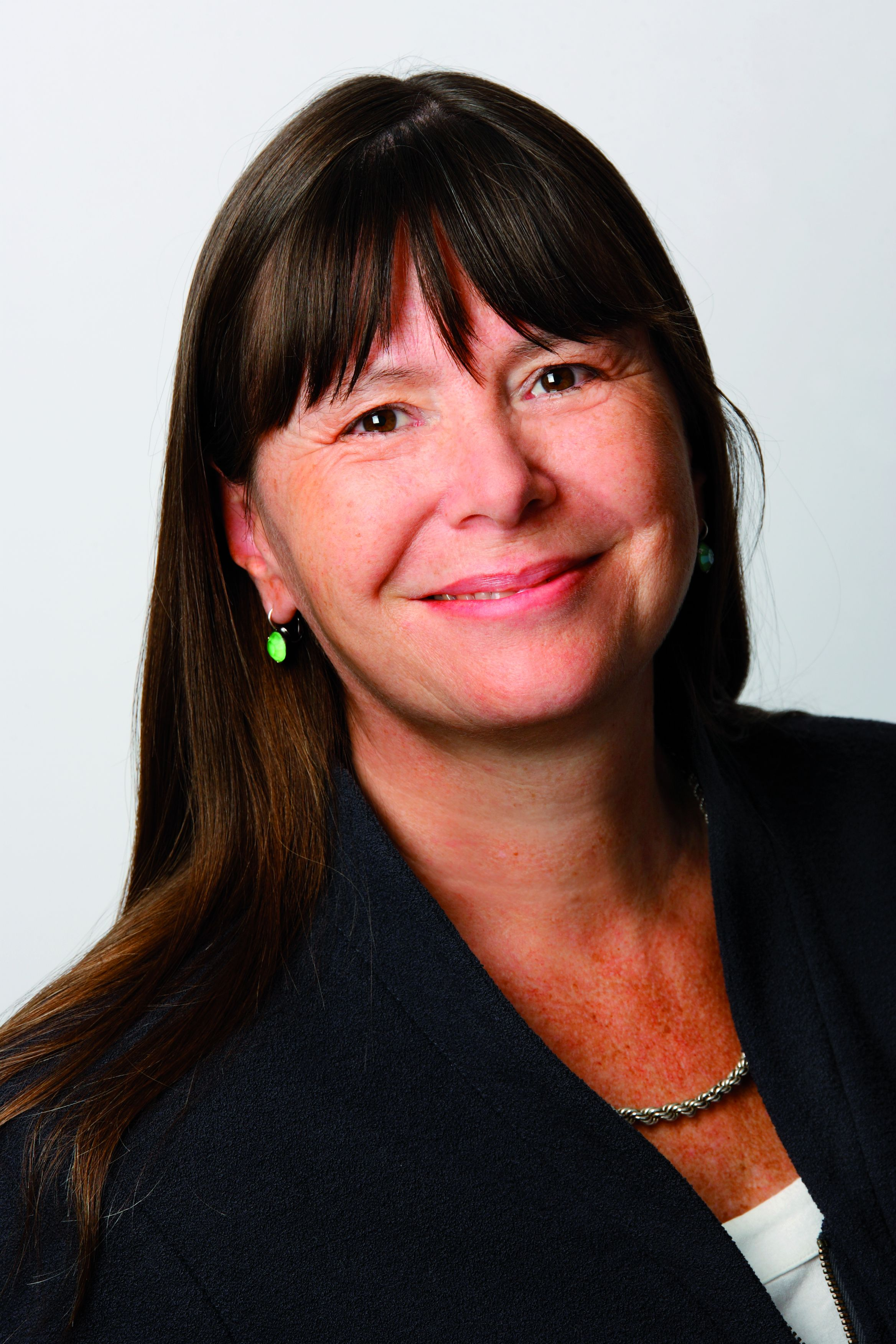

Ulrike Höfken (born 14 May 1955) is a German politician for the Alliance 90/The Greens.

== Life and politics ==
Höfken was born 1955 in the westgerman city of Duesseldorf and studied agricultural science.

Höfken entered the Greens in 1989 and was member of the Bundestag, the German federal diet from 1994 to 2011.
