= Gerald Häfner =

German politician (born 1956)

Gerald Häfner MEP
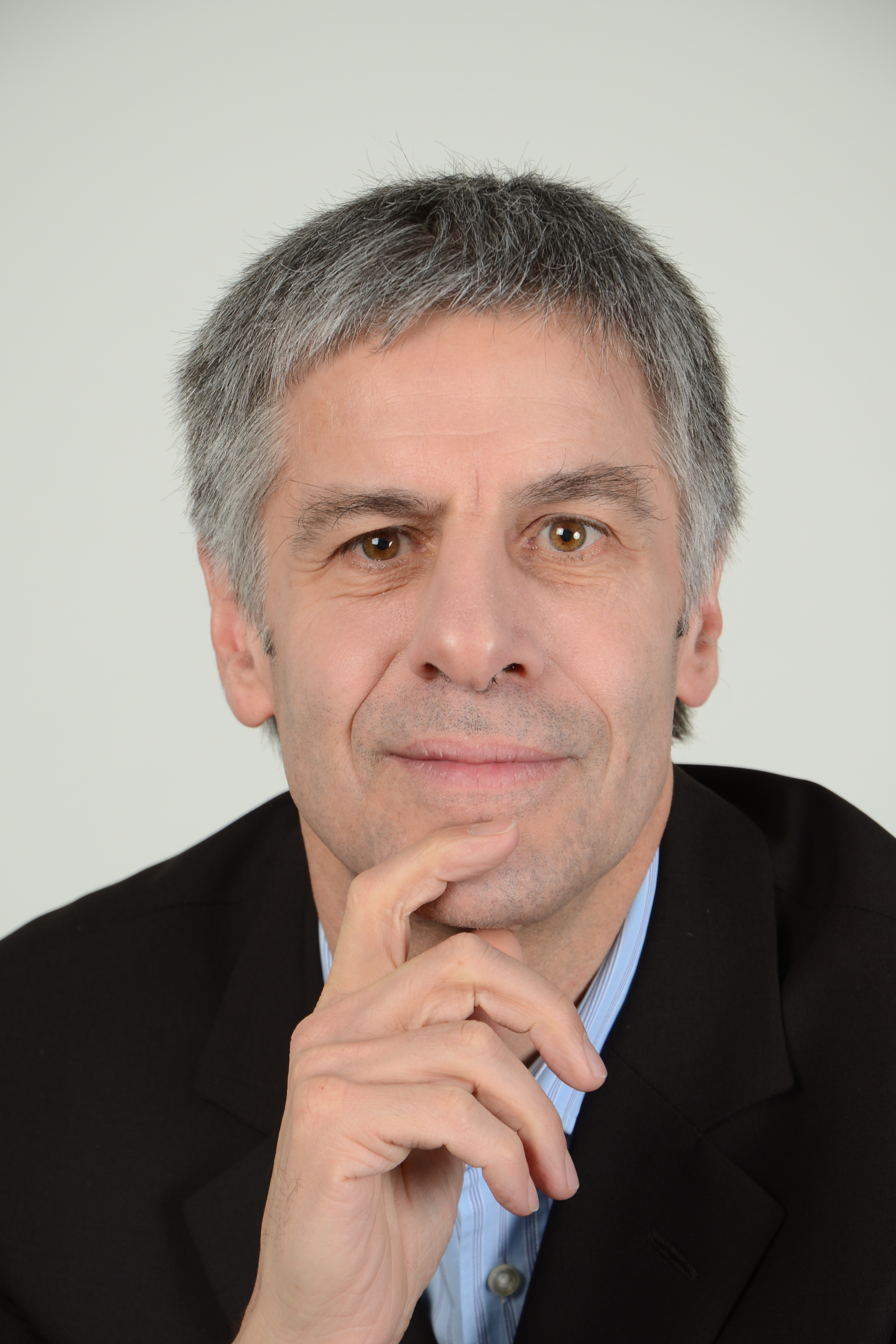
- In office 14 July 2009 – 30 June 2014

Personal details
- Born: 3 November 1956 (age 69) Munich
- Party: Alliance 90/The Greens

Gerald Häfner (born 3 November 1956 in Munich) is a German politician who served as an MEP for Alliance 90/The Greens between 2009 and 2014. He had three separate spells as a member of the Bundestag between 1987 and 2002 (1987-1990, 1994-1998 and 2001-2002). In 1980 he was one of the founding members of the Greens.

In addition to his committee assignments, Häfner was a member of the European Parliament's Advisory Committee on the Conduct of Members from 2012 until 2014.
