= Christa Nickels =

German politician

Christa Nickels (née Kleuters; born 29 July 1952) is a German former nurse and politician of Alliance 90/The Greens who served as Parliamentary State Secretary to the Federal Minister of Health and Commissioner on Narcotic Drugs in the cabinet of Chancellor Gerhard Schröder.

== Political career ==
Nickels served as Member of the German Bundestag from 1983 to 1985, from 1987 to 1990 and from 1994 to 2005. In a tumultuous plenary debate on a plan to deploy American Pershing II and cruise missiles in November 1983, she notably gave Chancellor Helmut Kohl a wreath of paper cranes made by children in Hiroshima.

In 1984, Nickels became one of six Green Party women – alongside Annemarie Borgmann, Waltraud Schoppe, Heidemarie Dann and Erika Hickel – who took over the leadership of her party's parliamentary group, displacing better-known Green figures like Petra Kelly and Otto Schily.

When, on 18 October 1984, President of the Bundestag Richard Stücklen excluded Green Party MP Jürgen Reents from the session for calling Helmut Kohl "bought by Flick", Nickels requested an interruption. Stücklen turned her microphone off, which prompted Joschka Fischer to address him, "With respect, Mr. President, you are an asshole", for which he in turn was excluded by Stücklen. Fischer apologized to Stücklen two days later.

Nickels chaired the Committee on Petitions from 1994 to 1998 and the Committee on Human Right and Humanitarian Aid from 2001 to 2005.

Following the 2002 elections, Nickels was part of the Green Party's team in the negotiations with the Social Democrats on a coalition agreement for the second government under the leadership of Chancellor Gerhard Schröder.

Ahead of the 2005 elections, Nickels announced her intention to run for another term but eventually failed to secure her party's nomination.

== Other activities ==
- donum vitae, Member of the Board of Trustees (since 2001)
- Xertifix, Member of the Board of Trustees

== Personal life ==
Nickels is married and the mother of two children.
