= Matthias Berninger =

German politician (born 1971)

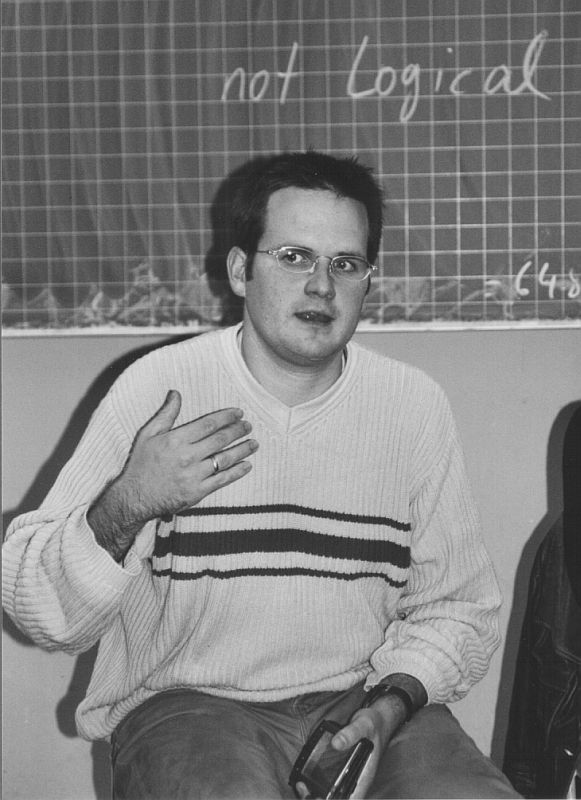
Berninger in 2004

Matthias Berninger (born 1971) is a former German politician and member of The Greens from 1993 until 2007.

From 2001 to 2005, Berninger served as Parliamentary Secretary of State at the Federal Ministry of Food, Agriculture and Consumer Protection under minister Renate Künast in the second cabinet of Chancellor Gerhard Schröder. After leaving the government, he was his parliamentary group's spokesperson on economic policy from 2005 until 2007.

Since 2019, Berninger has been serving as Executive Vice President of Public and Government Affairs and Head of Sustainability at Bayer. Berninger lives with his wife and children in Washington, D.C.

== School and studies ==
After graduating from the Goethe-Gymnasium Kassel in 1990, Berninger began studying chemistry and political science at the Gesamthochschule Kassel, which he completed in 1994 with the first state examination for the teaching profession at secondary schools.

== Political career ==
Since 1990, Berninger has been a member of Bündnis 90/Die Grünen. From 1993 to 1997 he was a member of the municipal council of Ahnatal and from 1993 to 1994 also in the Kreistag of the Landkreis Kassel. From 2003 to 2007, Berninger was parliamentary representative for the Green Party for the State of Hesse in the Bundestag.

In the 1994 Bundestag election, at the age of 23, Berninger became the youngest ever Member of the German Bundestag. Here, from 1997 to 2001, he was the higher education policy spokesman for the parliamentary group Alliance 90/The Greens. On 23 January 2001, Berninger was appointed Parliamentary Secretary of State to the Federal Minister of Consumer Protection, Food and Agriculture led by Chancellor Gerhard Schröder. At the age of 29, he became the youngest parliamentary Secretary of State ever appointed.

Berninger left his post of Parliamentary Secretary of State on 22 November 2005. He ran for the post of parliamentary secretary, but was defeated by Volker Beck on the first ballot by 17 votes to 34. From 2005 to 2007, he served as the economic policy spokesman for the Bündnis 90/Die Grünen. Berninger ended his political career in February 2007.

Berninger was considered a realo and a pupil of Joschka Fischer. He was a member of the Pizza Connection, a group of young deputies of the CDU and Bündnis 90/Die Grünen, which was considered a forerunner of the Black-Green Coalition. Berninger was considered an Economic Liberal and representative of the New Economy.

== Private sector ==
In 2007, Berninger moved to Brussels as a lobbyist to the U.S. food and confectionery corporation Mars Incorporated as Director of Corporate Health and Nutrition, to improve the companies public image in Europe. In August 2008, he was promoted to Global Head of Public Policy, with responsibility for global health, nutrition and sustainability.

On 1 January 2019, Berninger moved to Bayer AG as head of the newly created Public Relations and Sustainability division, after the group acquired U.S. seed and pesticide manufacturer Monsanto for 59 billion euros. As a result, Berninger, as chief lobbyist, must deal with questions about the pesticide glyphosate, the use of which is highly criticized by his former Bündnis 90/Die Grünen colleagues in Germany. He commented on this in an interview with the news magazine Der Spiegel.

== Film ==
- Rot-Grün macht Kasse. Documentary about the activities of former politicians as lobbyists, 30 min, Germany, 2011, Production: NDR/Panorama

== Cabinets ==
- Schröder Cabinet I - Schröder Cabinet II
