= Angelika Beer =

German politician (born 1957)

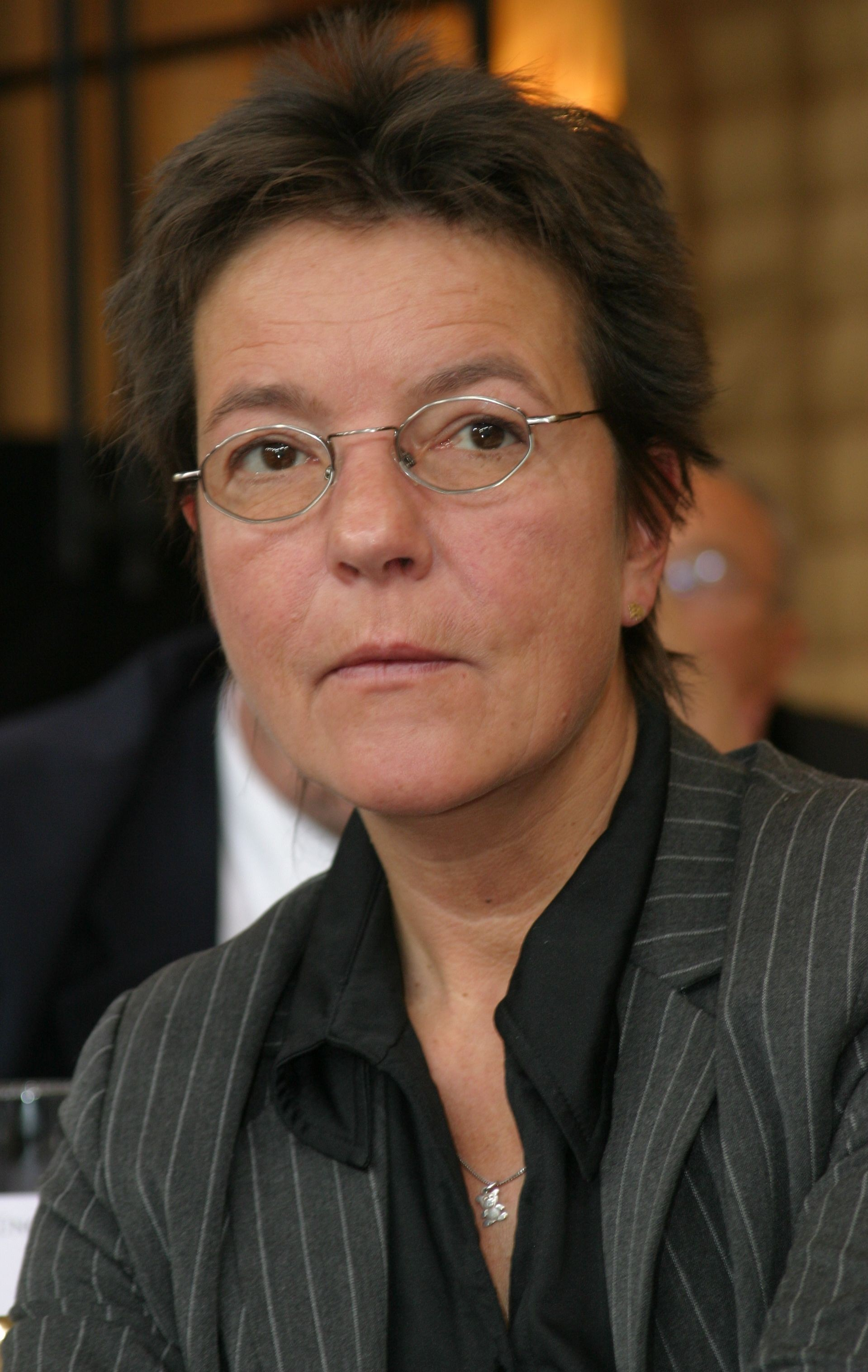
- Angelika Beer in 2004
- Born: 24 May 1957 (age 69); Kiel, Schleswig-Holstein, West Germany (now Germany)
- Political party: Pirate Party (Germany); Formerly: Alliance 90/The Greens

Angelika Beer (born 24 May 1957) is a German politician.

== Life ==
2004 to 2009 she was a Member of the European Parliament for Alliance 90/The Greens, part of the European Greens. She was chair of the delegation for relations with Iran and a member on the delegation for relations with Afghanistan and the Delegation for relations with the NATO Parliamentary Assembly, the Foreign Affairs committee and the Subcommittee on Security and Defence.

In January, she was not reelected on a place on the European Parliamentary election list for Alliance 90/The Greens. She left the Green Party at the end of March 2009. As a reason for her exit, she criticised the Green Party's aspiration after power and the loss of its pacifistic orientation.

In November 2009 she became a member of Pirate Party Germany. In May 2012 she was elected as one of six Pirates to become a member of the state parliament of Schleswig-Holstein. Angelika Beer is married since 2003 with Bundeswehr Colonel lieutenant Peter Matthiesen.
