= Antje Vollmer =

German politician and academic (1943–2023)

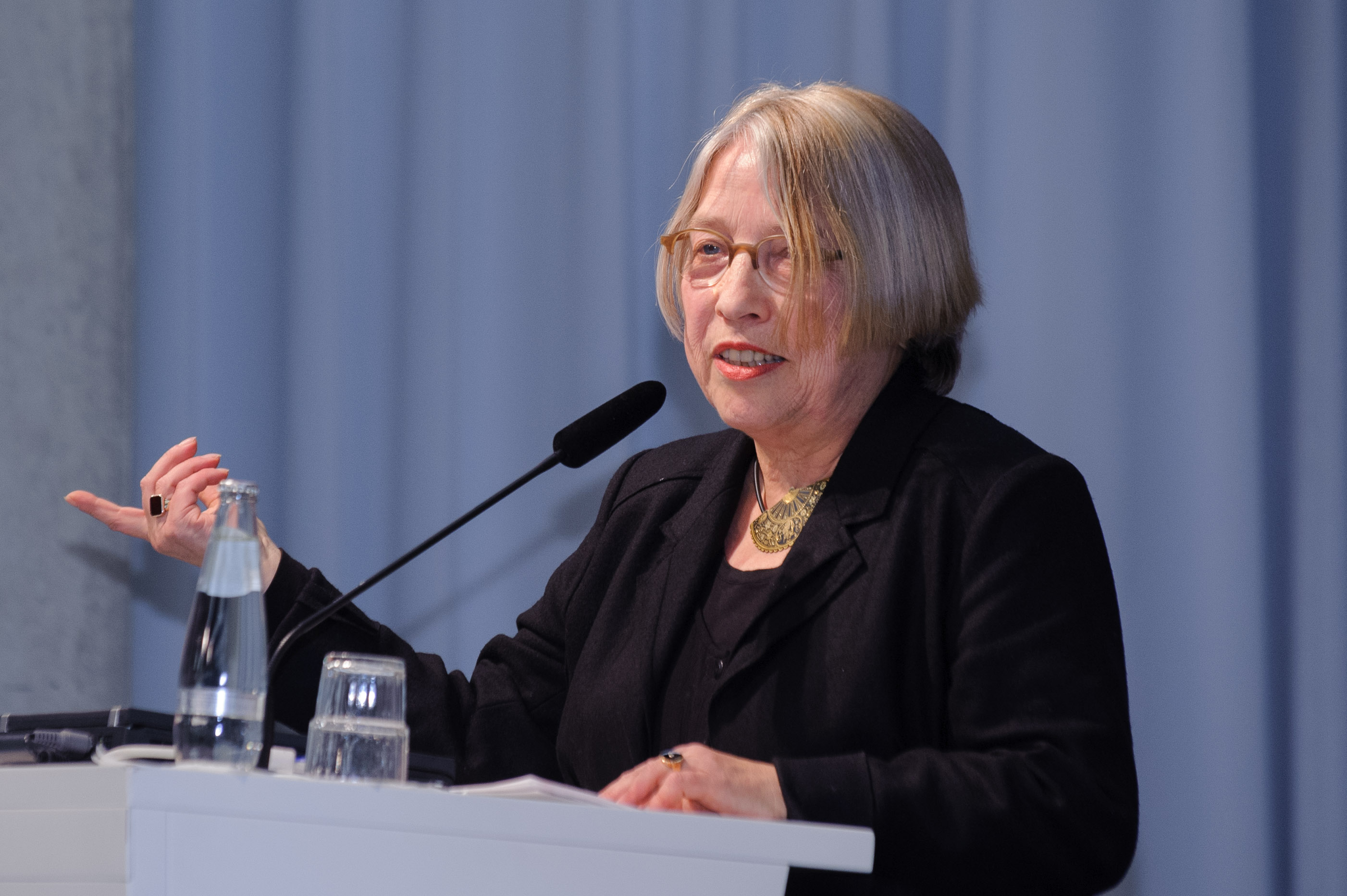
- Vollmer in 2013

Vice President of the Bundestag
- In office November 1994 – 2005
- President: Rita Süssmuth; Wolfgang Thierse

Personal details
- Born: 31 May 1943 Lübbecke, Gau Westphalia-North, Nazi Germany (now North Rhine-Westphalia, Germany)
- Died: 15 March 2023 (aged 79)
- Party: Alliance '90/The Greens
- Profession: Theologian and politician
- Website: www.antje-vollmer.de (in German)

Antje Vollmer (German: [ˈantjə ˈfɔlmɐ]; 31 May 1943 – 15 March 2023) was a German Protestant theologian, academic teacher and politician of the Alliance 90/The Greens. She became a member of the Bundestag in 1983 when the Greens first entered the West German parliament, before joining the party in 1985. From 1994 to 2005, she was Vice President of the Bundestag, the first Green in the position. She was a pacifist.

== Education and early career ==
Vollmer was born in Lübbecke (Westphalia). Her parents ran a textile shop which they later had to close. After graduating from Wittekind-Gymnasium Lübbecke in 1962, she studied Protestant theology in Berlin, Heidelberg, Tübingen, and Paris, completing her first theological exam in 1968, her second in 1971, and receiving her doctorate in 1973. From 1969 to 1971, she was a research assistant at the Kirchliche Hochschule Berlin. In 1971, she started a postgraduate course in adult education, which she completed in 1975. From 1971 to 1974, she worked as a pastor in Berlin-Wedding, a problematic district at the time. From 1976 to 1982, she was an instructor in adult education at the Heimvolkshochschule of the Bethel Foundation in Bielefeld; she collaborated with the local Protestant and Catholic organisations for rural young people (Landjugend), and experienced the beginning of the ecological movement. She wrote a book related to the attempt to assassinate Hitler in the 20 July plot together with Lars-Broder Keil, Stauffenbergs Gefährten: Das Schicksal der unbekannten Verschwörer ("Stauffenberg's companions: The fate of the unknown conspirators"), which was published in 2013.

== Political career ==
In the 1970s, Vollmer was politically active in the Anti-Imperialist League (Liga gegen den Imperialismus), close to the Maoist KPD/AO, but did not join the party. They were activists against the Vietnam War. She became a member of the Bundestag in 1983 on the ticket of the Green Party, although she was not a party member. In 1985, she joined the Greens. In 1984, she was elected to the party's board in parliament, as one of three women. In 1985, she initiated a dialogue of the state and prisoners of the Red Army Faction. Within the party, she called in "Grüner Aufbruch" for a bridge between the "Realos" and "Fundis", those adjusting to the realities of possible developments, and fundamental thinkers. Due to the party principle of rotation she had to give up the parliamentary seat in 1985, but was reelected in 1987 and again in 1994, 1998, and 2002.

In November 1994, Vollmer was the first politician of the Green Party to be elected into the Presidium of the Bundestag. She remained vice president of the Bundestag until the 2005 elections, at which point, she did not run for re-election.

== Later life ==
In 2009, Vollmer was awarded the Mercator Visiting Professorship for Political Management at the Universität Essen-Duisburg's NRW School of Governance. She gave both seminars and lectures at the university.

Vollmer was one of the first signatories of an open letter on the German position on the Russo-Ukrainian War, published in the magazine EMMA in April 2022, which called on Chancellor Olaf Scholz to not supply Ukraine with offensive weapons during the Russian invasion of Ukraine and to do everything he could to end the war, in order to prevent an escalation of the conflict into "a third world war".

== Personal life ==
In 1979, Vollmer gave birth to a son, Johann, whom she raised as a single mother.

Vollmer died on 15 March 2023, at age 79.

Katrin Göring-Eckardt, vice president of the Bundestag then, said of Vollmer, "She was there from the beginning and fought through much of what we benefit from today. And she kept her own head, unbending!" ("Sie war von Beginn an dabei und hat Vieles von dem durchgekämpft, wovon wir heute profitieren. Und sie hat ihren eigenen Kopf behalten, unbeugsam!)

== Awards ==
- 1989 Carl von Ossietzky Medal
- 1996 Cicero Speaker Prize
- 1997 Charles University Medal in Prague
- 1998 Hannah Arendt Prize
- 1998 Art Prize for German-Czech Understanding
- 2003 Order of Tomáš Garrigue Masaryk of the Czech Republic
- 2005 Commander's Cross of the Order of Merit of the Federal Republic of Germany

== Publications ==
- Vollmer, Antje; Wenzel, Hans-Eckard; AB Die Andere Bibliothek GmbH & Co. KG (2019). Konrad Wolf : Chronist im Jahrhundert der Extreme (in German). Berlin. ISBN 978-3-8477-0416-4. OCLC 1119103549.
- ——; Dahn, Daniela; Klein, Dieter; Zimmer, Gabriele; Schulze, Ingo; Brie, Michael; Brandt, Peter; Gruppe Neubeginn (2022). Neubeginn Aufbegehren gegen Krise und Krieg : eine Flugschrift (in German). Hamburg: VSA-Verlag. ISBN 978-3-96488-138-0. OCLC 1313608482.
- —— (2015). Hinter den Bildern die Welt : die untergegangene Bundesrepublik in den Filmen von Rainer Werner Fassbinder : ein Briefwechsel (in German). Berlin. ISBN 978-3-941155-44-2. OCLC 919438422.
- —— (2016). Die Neuwerkbewegung zwischen Jugendbewegung und religiösem Sozialismus (in German). Freiburg: Verlag Herder. ISBN 978-3-451-31504-6. OCLC 949778514.
- Nida-Rümelin, Julian; Kumm, Mattias; Vad, Erich; Müller, Albrecht von; Weidenfeld, Werner; —— (2022). Perspektiven nach dem Ukrainekrieg Europa auf dem Weg zu einer neuen Friedensordnung? (in German). Freiburg: Verlag Herder. ISBN 978-3-451-39524-6. OCLC 1346145450.
- —— (1984). --und wehret euch täglich! : Bonn, ein Grünes Tagebuch (in German). Gütersloh: G. Mohn. ISBN 3-579-00570-7. OCLC 12422216.
- —— (1996). Heisser Frieden über Gewalt, Macht und das Geheimnis der Zivilisation (in German). München. ISBN 978-3-423-30563-1. OCLC 75816566.
- —— (1986). Kein Wunderland für Alice? : Frauenutopien (in German). Hamburg: Konkret Literatur Verlag. ISBN 3-922144-58-6. OCLC 17413214.
- —— (1991). Die schöne Macht der Vernunft : Auskünfte über eine Generation (in German). Berlin: Verlag der Nation. ISBN 3-373-00468-3. OCLC 27409029.

=== Dissertation ===
- Vollmer, Antje (1973). Die Neuwerkbewegung : 1919-1935 : ein Beitrag zur Geschichte der Jugendbewegung, des Religiösen Sozialismus und der Arbeiterbildung : Inaugural-Dissertation ... (in German). Berlin: [A. Vollmer]. OCLC 868252249.
