= Stuttgart I (electoral district) =

Electoral constituency represented in the Bundestag

258 Stuttgart I
- Electoral district for the Bundestag
- Stuttgart I in 2025
- State: Baden-Württemberg
- Population: 310,800 (2019)
- Electorate: 191,811 (2021)
- Major settlements: Stuttgart (partial)
- Area: 113.8 km^{2}

Current Electoral district
- Created: 1949
- Party: GRÜNE
- Member: Simone Fischer
- Elected: 2025

Stuttgart I is an electoral constituency (German: Wahlkreis) represented in the Bundestag. It elects one member via first-past-the-post voting. Under the current constituency numbering system, it is designated as constituency 258. It is located in central Baden-Württemberg, comprising the central and southern part of the city of Stuttgart.

Stuttgart I was created for the inaugural 1949 federal election. Since 2025, it has been represented by Simone Fischer of the Alliance 90/The Greens.

== Geography ==
Stuttgart I is located in central Baden-Württemberg. As of the 2021 federal election, it comprises the Stadtbezirke of Birkach, Degerloch, Hedelfingen, Möhringen, Plieningen, Sillenbuch, Stuttgart-Mitte, Stuttgart-Nord, Stuttgart-Süd, Stuttgart-West, and Vaihingen from the independent city of Stuttgart.

== History ==
Stuttgart I was created in 1949. In the 1980 through 1998 elections, it was named Stuttgart-Süd. In the 1949 election, it was Württemberg-Baden Landesbezirk Württemberg constituency 1 in the numbering system. In the 1953 through 1961 elections, it was number 163. In the 1965 through 1976 elections, it was number 164. In the 1980 through 1998 elections, it was number 162. In the 2002 and 2005 elections, it was number 259. Since the 2009 election, it has been number 258.

Originally, the constituency comprised the Stadtteile of Stuttgart-West, Stuttgart-Mitte, Stuttgart-Süd, Weilimdorf, Feuerbach, Botnang, Vaihingen, Möhringen, Degerloch, Birkach, Hohenheim, and Plieningen from the independent city of Stuttgart. In the 1965 through 1976 elections, it comprised the Stadtteile of Bad Cannstatt, Stammheim, Zuffenhausen, Mühlhausen, Münster, Feuerbach, Weilimdorf, and Botnang. It acquired its current borders in the 1980 election.

Election	No.	Name	Borders
1949	1	Stuttgart I	Stuttgart city (only Stuttgart-West, Stuttgart-Mitte, Stuttgart-Süd, Weilimdorf, Feuerbach, Botnang, Vaihingen, Möhringen, Degerloch, Birkach, Hohenheim, and Plieningen Stadtteile)
1953	163	Stuttgart I	Stuttgart city (only Stuttgart-West, Stuttgart-Mitte, Stuttgart-Süd, Weilimdorf, Feuerbach, Botnang, Vaihingen, Möhringen, Degerloch, Birkach, Hohenheim, and Plieningen Stadtteile)
1957	163	Stuttgart I	Stuttgart city (only Stuttgart-West, Stuttgart-Mitte, Stuttgart-Süd, Weilimdorf, Feuerbach, Botnang, Vaihingen, Möhringen, Degerloch, Birkach, Hohenheim, and Plieningen Stadtteile)
1961	163	Stuttgart I	Stuttgart city (only Stuttgart-West, Stuttgart-Mitte, Stuttgart-Süd, Weilimdorf, Feuerbach, Botnang, Vaihingen, Möhringen, Degerloch, Birkach, Hohenheim, and Plieningen Stadtteile)
1965	164	Stuttgart I	Stuttgart city (only Bad Cannstatt, Stammheim, Zuffenhausen, Mühlhausen, Münster, Feuerbach, Weilimdorf, and Botnang Stadtteile)
1969	164	Stuttgart I	Stuttgart city (only Bad Cannstatt, Stammheim, Zuffenhausen, Mühlhausen, Münster, Feuerbach, Weilimdorf, and Botnang Stadtteile)
1972	164	Stuttgart I	Stuttgart city (only Bad Cannstatt, Stammheim, Zuffenhausen, Mühlhausen, Münster, Feuerbach, Weilimdorf, and Botnang Stadtteile)
1976	164	Stuttgart I	Stuttgart city (only Bad Cannstatt, Stammheim, Zuffenhausen, Mühlhausen, Münster, Feuerbach, Weilimdorf, and Botnang Stadtteile)
1980	162	Stuttgart-Süd	Stuttgart city (only Birkach, Degerloch, Hedelfingen, Möhringen, Plieningen, Sillenbuch, Stuttgart-Mitte, Stuttgart-Nord, Stuttgart-Süd, Stuttgart-West, and Vaihingen Stadtbezirke)
1983	162	Stuttgart-Süd	Stuttgart city (only Birkach, Degerloch, Hedelfingen, Möhringen, Plieningen, Sillenbuch, Stuttgart-Mitte, Stuttgart-Nord, Stuttgart-Süd, Stuttgart-West, and Vaihingen Stadtbezirke)
1987	162	Stuttgart-Süd	Stuttgart city (only Birkach, Degerloch, Hedelfingen, Möhringen, Plieningen, Sillenbuch, Stuttgart-Mitte, Stuttgart-Nord, Stuttgart-Süd, Stuttgart-West, and Vaihingen Stadtbezirke)
1990	162	Stuttgart-Süd	Stuttgart city (only Birkach, Degerloch, Hedelfingen, Möhringen, Plieningen, Sillenbuch, Stuttgart-Mitte, Stuttgart-Nord, Stuttgart-Süd, Stuttgart-West, and Vaihingen Stadtbezirke)
1994	162	Stuttgart-Süd	Stuttgart city (only Birkach, Degerloch, Hedelfingen, Möhringen, Plieningen, Sillenbuch, Stuttgart-Mitte, Stuttgart-Nord, Stuttgart-Süd, Stuttgart-West, and Vaihingen Stadtbezirke)
1998	162	Stuttgart-Süd	Stuttgart city (only Birkach, Degerloch, Hedelfingen, Möhringen, Plieningen, Sillenbuch, Stuttgart-Mitte, Stuttgart-Nord, Stuttgart-Süd, Stuttgart-West, and Vaihingen Stadtbezirke)
2002	259	Stuttgart I	Stuttgart city (only Birkach, Degerloch, Hedelfingen, Möhringen, Plieningen, Sillenbuch, Stuttgart-Mitte, Stuttgart-Nord, Stuttgart-Süd, Stuttgart-West, and Vaihingen Stadtbezirke)
2005	259	Stuttgart I	Stuttgart city (only Birkach, Degerloch, Hedelfingen, Möhringen, Plieningen, Sillenbuch, Stuttgart-Mitte, Stuttgart-Nord, Stuttgart-Süd, Stuttgart-West, and Vaihingen Stadtbezirke)
2009	258	Stuttgart I	Stuttgart city (only Birkach, Degerloch, Hedelfingen, Möhringen, Plieningen, Sillenbuch, Stuttgart-Mitte, Stuttgart-Nord, Stuttgart-Süd, Stuttgart-West, and Vaihingen Stadtbezirke)
2013	258	Stuttgart I	Stuttgart city (only Birkach, Degerloch, Hedelfingen, Möhringen, Plieningen, Sillenbuch, Stuttgart-Mitte, Stuttgart-Nord, Stuttgart-Süd, Stuttgart-West, and Vaihingen Stadtbezirke)
2017	258	Stuttgart I	Stuttgart city (only Birkach, Degerloch, Hedelfingen, Möhringen, Plieningen, Sillenbuch, Stuttgart-Mitte, Stuttgart-Nord, Stuttgart-Süd, Stuttgart-West, and Vaihingen Stadtbezirke)
2021	258	Stuttgart I	Stuttgart city (only Birkach, Degerloch, Hedelfingen, Möhringen, Plieningen, Sillenbuch, Stuttgart-Mitte, Stuttgart-Nord, Stuttgart-Süd, Stuttgart-West, and Vaihingen Stadtbezirke)
2025	258	Stuttgart I	Stuttgart city (only Birkach, Degerloch, Hedelfingen, Möhringen, Plieningen, Sillenbuch, Stuttgart-Mitte, Stuttgart-Nord, Stuttgart-Süd, Stuttgart-West, and Vaihingen Stadtbezirke)

== Members ==
The constituency was first represented by Clara Döhring of the Social Democratic Party (SPD) from 1949 to 1953. Artur Jahn won it for the Christian Democratic Union (CDU) in 1953 and served two terms before former member Döhring regained it in 1961. She was succeeded by fellow SPD member Erwin Schoettle from 1965 to 1972, followed by Peter Conradi from 1972 to 1980. Roland Sauer of the CDU was elected in 1980 and served until 1998. Hans Jochen Henke of the CDU served one term before Ernst Ulrich von Weizsäcker of the SPD won the constituency in 2002. Johann-Henrich Krummacher regained it for the CDU in 2005 and served one term. He was succeeded by Stefan Kaufmann in 2009, who was representative until 2021. Cem Özdemir won the constituency for the Greens in 2021. Simone Fischer held the seat for the Greens in 2025.

Election	Member	Party	%
1949	Clara Döhring	SPD	29.3
1953	Artur Jahn	CDU	33.9
1957	Artur Jahn	CDU	42.6
1961	Clara Döhring	SPD	37.9
1965	Erwin Schoettle	SPD	45.8
1969	Erwin Schoettle	SPD	51.4
1972	Peter Conradi	SPD	54.6
1976	Peter Conradi	SPD	49.8
1980	Roland Sauer	CDU	41.9
1983	Roland Sauer	CDU	49.4
1987	Roland Sauer	CDU	43.9
1990	Roland Sauer	CDU	40.9
1994	Roland Sauer	CDU	42.7
1998	Hans Jochen Henke	CDU	37.7
2002	Ernst Ulrich von Weizsäcker	SPD	42.0
2005	Johann-Henrich Krummacher	CDU	39.2
2009	Stefan Kaufmann	CDU	34.4
2013	Stefan Kaufmann	CDU	42.0
2017	Stefan Kaufmann	CDU	32.0
2021	Cem Özdemir	GRÜNE	39.9
2025	Simone Fischer	GRÜNE	28.3

== Election results ==
=== 2025 election ===
The candidates of Greens and CDU each won 28.3% of the first votes, with Fischer winning 16 more votes, and a seat. There was no recount of votes. The only other possible outcome would be the city losing another Bundestag member, as constituency Stuttgart II is not represented in the Bundestag. If Fischer had lost in the constituency, she would not have won a seat via her party's list, being ranked too low. If the CDU candidate had won the constituency, she would not have been assigned a seat as too many other CDU winners won with higher shares.

Federal election (2025): Stuttgart I
Notes:	Blue background denotes the winner of the electorate vote. Pink background denotes a candidate elected from their party list. Yellow background denotes an electorate win by a list member, or other incumbent. A ✓ or ✗ denotes status of any incumbent, win or lose respectively.						
Party	Candidate	Votes	%	±%	Party votes	%	±%
Greens	Simone Fischer	45,668	28.3	▼11.6	40,810	25.2	▼3.2
CDU	Elisabeth Schick-Ebert	45,652	28.3	▲5.0	42,315	26.2	▲6.1
SPD	Anna Schanbacher	25,231	15.7	▲2.9	24,194	15.0	▼4.8
Left	Luigi Pantisano	14,200	8.8	▲4.7	17,528	10.8	▲5.7
AfD	Steffen Degler	13,843	8.6	▲4.6	14,422	8.9	▲4.7
FDP	Judith Skudelny	9,327	5.8	▼4.7	11,751	7.3	▼9.3
dieBasis					307	0.2	▼1.0
PARTEI	Jasper Pannen	1,570	1.0	▼0.1	685	0.4	▼0.4
Tierschutzpartei					828	0.5	▼0.3
FW	Julian Korbel	1,980	1.2	▲0.4	878	0.5	▼0.2
Volt	Juliane Unbereit	3,426	2.1	▲1.6	2,058	1.3	▲0.7
ÖDP					260	0.2	▼0.1
Bündnis C					148	0.1	Steady
BD					108	0.1	
MLPD	Elfriede Schuler	283	0.2	▲0.1	94	0.1	Steady
Gesundheitsforschung							Steady
BSW					5,291	3.3	
BüSo				0.0			
Informal votes		912			415		
Total valid votes		161,180			161,677		
Turnout		162,092	85.8	▲3.7			
Greens hold	Majority	14	0.0	▼11.6			

=== 2021 election ===
Federal election (2021): Stuttgart I
Notes:	Blue background denotes the winner of the electorate vote. Pink background denotes a candidate elected from their party list. Yellow background denotes an electorate win by a list member, or other incumbent. A ✓ or ✗ denotes status of any incumbent, win or lose respectively.						
Party	Candidate	Votes	%	±%	Party votes	%	±%
Greens	Cem Özdemir	62,594	39.9	▲10.2	44,559	28.4	▲8.9
CDU	✗ Stefan Kaufmann	36,605	23.4	▼8.7	31,536	20.1	▼8.8
SPD	Lucia Schanbacher	20,012	12.8	▼0.1	31,003	19.8	▲5.2
FDP	Judith Skudelny	16,504	10.5	▲2.1	26,036	16.6	▲0.2
Left	Bernd Riexinger	6,447	4.1	▼2.4	8,127	5.2	▼4.1
AfD	Dirk Spaniel	6,295	4.0	▼2.6	6,591	4.2	▼3.0
dieBasis	Miriam Nikola	1,985	1.3		1,821	1.2	
PARTEI	Xenia Lehmann	1,684	1.1	0.0	1,315	0.8	▼0.2
Tierschutzpartei	Marcel Krohn	1,528	1.0	0.0	1,271	0.8	▲0.1
FW	Klaus Wirthwein	1,281	0.8		1,088	0.7	▲0.4
Volt	Julia Böcklen	877	0.6		910	0.6	
Team Todenhöfer					706	0.5	
Pirates					594	0.4	▼0.3
ÖDP					344	0.2	▼0.1
Humanists	Berthold Stegemann	256	0.2		207	0.1	
Bündnis C					169	0.1	
Bürgerbewegung	Ralph Schertlen	216	0.1		127	0.1	
DiB	Heinz Jabokeit	213	0.1		158	0.1	▼0.2
MLPD	Julia Scheller	125	0.1	▼0.1	88	0.1	0.0
Gesundheitsforschung					69	0.0	
DKP					46	0.0	0.0
BüSo	Marc Schuller	34	0.0	0.0			
NPD					32	0.0	▼0.1
Independent	Werner Ressdorf	26	0.0				
Bündnis 21					22	0.0	
LKR					19	0.0	
Informal votes		832			676		
Total valid votes		156,682			156,838		
Turnout		157,514	82.1	▼0.6			
Greens gain from CDU	Majority	25,989	16.5				

=== 2017 election ===
Federal election (2017): Stuttgart I
Notes:	Blue background denotes the winner of the electorate vote. Pink background denotes a candidate elected from their party list. Yellow background denotes an electorate win by a list member, or other incumbent. A ✓ or ✗ denotes status of any incumbent, win or lose respectively.						
Party	Candidate	Votes	%	±%	Party votes	%	±%
CDU	✓ Stefan Kaufmann	51,118	32.0	▼9.9	46,243	28.9	▼8.6
Greens	Cem Özdemir	47,430	29.7	▲2.3	31,283	19.6	▲2.0
SPD	Ute Vogt	20,512	12.8	▼3.7	23,350	14.6	▼6.4
FDP	Judith Skudelny	13,399	8.4	▲5.8	26,203	16.4	▲8.1
AfD	Dirk Spaniel	10,646	6.7	▲3.9	11,455	7.2	▲3.0
Left	Johanna Tiarks	10,409	6.5	▲2.7	14,830	9.3	▲3.0
PARTEI	Julian Heinkele	1,755	1.1		1,602	1.0	
Tierschutzpartei	Matthias Ebner	1,576	1.0		1,063	0.7	▲0.1
Pirates	Michael Knödler	1,438	0.9	▼1.3	1,006	0.6	▼2.2
ÖDP	Dieter Baur	721	0.5	0.0	498	1.3	0.0
FW					480	0.3	▼0.1
DiB					432	0.3	
BGE					404	0.3	
Independent	Steffen Schuldis	327	0.2				
DM					250	0.2	
V-Partei³					222	0.1	
Tierschutzallianz					203	0.1	
MLPD	Harald Andre	215	0.1		144	0.1	0.0
Menschliche Welt					136	0.1	
NPD					114	0.1	▼0.3
BüSo	Hubertus Mohs	86	0.1	▼0.1			
DKP					53	0.0	
Independent	Werner Ressdorf	45	0.0				
DIE RECHTE					14	0.0	
Informal votes		1,157			849		
Total valid votes		159,677			159,985		
Turnout		160,834	82.7	▲3.0			
CDU hold	Majority	3,688	2.3	▼12.2			

=== 2013 election ===
Federal election (2013): Stuttgart I
Notes:	Blue background denotes the winner of the electorate vote. Pink background denotes a candidate elected from their party list. Yellow background denotes an electorate win by a list member, or other incumbent. A ✓ or ✗ denotes status of any incumbent, win or lose respectively.						
Party	Candidate	Votes	%	±%	Party votes	%	±%
CDU	✓ Stefan Kaufmann	63,465	42.0	▲7.5	56,794	37.5	▲9.6
Greens	Cem Özdemir	41,522	27.5	▼2.4	26,534	17.5	▼4.5
SPD	Ute Vogt	25,050	16.6	▼1.4	31,766	21.0	▲2.1
Left	Christina Frank	5,824	3.9	▼0.8	9,432	6.2	▼0.5
AfD	Ronald Geiger	4,151	2.7		6,281	4.1	
FDP	Judith Skudelny	3,894	2.6	▼7.7	12,548	8.3	▼11.2
Pirates	Christian Thomae	3,315	2.2	▲0.5	4,338	2.9	▲0.4
Independent	Frank Schweizer	1,472	1.0				
Tierschutzpartei					860	0.6	▲0.1
FW	Gerhard Hammitzsch	864	0.6		645	0.4	
ÖDP	Dieter Baur	697	0.5		528	0.3	0.0
NPD	Ronnie Hellriegel	673	0.4	▼0.3	506	0.3	▼0.2
RENTNER					258	0.2	
REP					224	0.1	▼0.4
PBC					170	0.1	▼0.1
Volksabstimmung					141	0.1	0.0
BIG					136	0.1	
MLPD					103	0.1	0.0
Party of Reason					91	0.1	
BüSo	Hubertus Mohs	161	0.1	▼0.2	79	0.1	▼0.1
Independent	Hans-Jürgen Gäbel	84	0.1				
Independent	Werner Ressdorf	76	0.1				
PRO					66	0.0	
Informal votes		1,298			1,046		
Total valid votes		151,248			151,500		
Turnout		152,546	79.8	▲2.5			
CDU hold	Majority	21,943	14.5	▲10.0			

=== 2009 election ===
Federal election (2009): Stuttgart I
Notes:	Blue background denotes the winner of the electorate vote. Pink background denotes a candidate elected from their party list. Yellow background denotes an electorate win by a list member, or other incumbent. A ✓ or ✗ denotes status of any incumbent, win or lose respectively.						
Party	Candidate	Votes	%	±%	Party votes	%	±%
CDU	Stefan Kaufmann	48,518	34.4	▼4.7	39,482	27.9	▼4.5
Greens	Cem Özdemir	42,116	29.9	▲19.5	31,076	22.0	▲4.7
SPD	Ute Vogt	25,364	18.0	▼20.6	26,656	18.9	▼11.3
FDP	Michael Conz	14,514	10.3	▲3.6	27,557	19.5	▲5.8
Left	Marta Aparicio de Eckelmann	6,601	4.7	▲1.7	9,439	6.7	▲2.8
Pirates	Stefan Urbat	2,350	1.7		3,426	2.4	
REP					758	0.5	▼0.1
NPD	Ronnie Hellriegel	1,068	0.8	▲0.1	691	0.5	0.0
Tierschutzpartei					667	0.5	
ÖDP					494	0.3	
DIE VIOLETTEN					361	0.3	
PBC					250	0.2	▼0.1
BüSo	Hubertus Mohs	446	0.3	▲0.1	150	0.1	0.0
MLPD					144	0.1	0.0
Volksabstimmung					143	0.1	
DVU					60	0.0	
ADM					30	0.0	
Informal votes		1,527			1,120		
Total valid votes		140,977			141,384		
Turnout		142,504	77.3	▼3.8			
CDU hold	Majority	6,402	4.5	▲4.0			

=== 2005 election ===
Federal election (2005): Stuttgart I
Notes:	Blue background denotes the winner of the electorate vote. Pink background denotes a candidate elected from their party list. Yellow background denotes an electorate win by a list member, or other incumbent. A ✓ or ✗ denotes status of any incumbent, win or lose respectively.						
Party	Candidate	Votes	%	±%	Party votes	%	±%
CDU	Johann-Henrich Krummacher	56,243	39.2	▲1.9	46,703	32.5	▼1.5
SPD	Martin Körner	55,393	38.6	▼3.4	43,391	30.2	▼3.6
Greens	Peter-Stefan Siller	14,870	10.4	▼3.0	24,805	17.2	▼1.7
FDP	Ulrich Scholtz	9,599	6.7	▲1.4	19,697	13.7	▲4.4
Left	Manfred Hammel	4,255	3.0	▲2.0	5,607	3.9	▲2.5
GRAUEN	Uwe Held	1,099	0.8	▲0.3	880	0.6	▲0.4
NPD	Ronnie Hellriegel	987	0.7		684	0.5	▲0.3
REP					852	0.6	▼0.1
PBC	Walter Weiblen	583	0.4	0.0	433	0.3	0.0
Familie					443	0.3	
Independent	Karl Ritter	344	0.2				
BüSo	Hubertus Mohs	279	0.2	0.0	165	0.1	▲0.1
MLPD					171	0.1	
Informal votes		1,642			1,463		
Total valid votes		143,652			143,831		
Turnout		145,294	81.0	▼1.6			
CDU gain from SPD	Majority	850	0.6				
