= Bombing of Stuttgart in World War II =

The bombing of Stuttgart in World War II was a series of 53 air raids that formed part of the strategic air offensive of the Allies against Germany. The first bombing (by 20 aircraft of the Royal Air Force) occurred on 25 August 1940, and resulted in the destruction of 17 buildings. The city was repeatedly attacked over the next four and one-half years by both the RAF and the 8th Air Force as it had significant industrial capacity (including the Daimler and Porsche automotive factories) and several military bases, and was also a center of rail transportation in southwestern Germany. Stuttgart endured 18 large-scale attacks by the Royal Air Force (RAF) during the war (the first and last of which were on 5 March 1942 and 13 February 1945 respectively), during which 21,016 long tons (21,353 t) of bombs were dropped on the city, but the RAF concluded that its attacks against Stuttgart were not as effective as they could have been:

Stuttgart's experience was not as severe as other German cities. Its location, spread out in a series of deep valleys, had consistently frustrated the Pathfinders and the shelters dug into the sides of the surrounding hills had saved many lives.

== Background ==
Even before World War II, in 1916, Stuttgart had been a potential target for air raids because of its short distance from the Western Front of the First World War. In the next two years, the city would be attacked by Allied aviators on several occasions throughout 1917 and 1918, the Daimler plant in Stuttgart being of special interest to them. When the Royal Air Force's Bomber Command began its strategic bombing command during the Second World War, it initially targeted airstrips in Norway and France and U-boat pens in northern France, but soon added civilian targets, such as Stuttgart, to its target list in March 1940. As early as May of that year, the RAF attempts to bomb targets in Württemberg, of which there were two among the mostly rural region: Stuttgart and Friedrichshafen. Nicknamed the "German Coventry," Stuttgart was an important rail hub and a center of industry, home to the Bosch, Daimler-Benz, and the SKF ball bearings factories. However, actually reaching these targets was difficult because of their great distance from Britain and because of Württemberg's topography of hills and valleys, which befouled the accuracy of British bomb crews. The workaround was to attack in force, starting in 1942–43, but these raids sometimes struck false targets and were costly in life and material.

On 14 February 1942, the Royal Air Force lifted all constraints from Bomber Command, and Stuttgart was on Bomber Command's list of "Alternative Industrial Areas" with Frankfurt, Schweinfurt, and Kiel.

=== Stuttgart's defenses ===
Preparations to protect Stuttgart's citizens from British air raids, though they were downplayed, were made in September 1939 with the establishment of twenty first aid stations. The 31 May 1940 issue of the local Nazi Party newspaper NS-Kurier boasted that the Reichsluftschutzbund had taken advantage of Stuttgart's "natural physical conditions," and that no civilian fatalities were expected. In the first air raid on the city of the war on the night of 25 August 1940, four were killed and five injured. The next two raids resulted in no fatalities. As a result, Stuttgart was deemed safe enough to receive evacuees from cities already heavily damaged by British bombings such as Hamburg, Essen, and Düsseldorf.

Stuttgart was defended at the outset of the war by I./Jagdgeschwader 52 based at Böblingen.

By 1944, Stuttgart was defended by 11 heavy (88 mm) and 38 light (20 mm to 40 mm) anti-aircraft gun batteries. There was also a Luftwaffe fighter base south of the city at Echterdingen. The landmark Observation Tower Burgholzhof was used by anti-aircraft spotters during raids. The Pragstattel Flakturm stands just north of central Stuttgart along a busy highway, decorated with signage, and the bullet-shaped Winkel Towers built around the city also remain.

== Raids ==
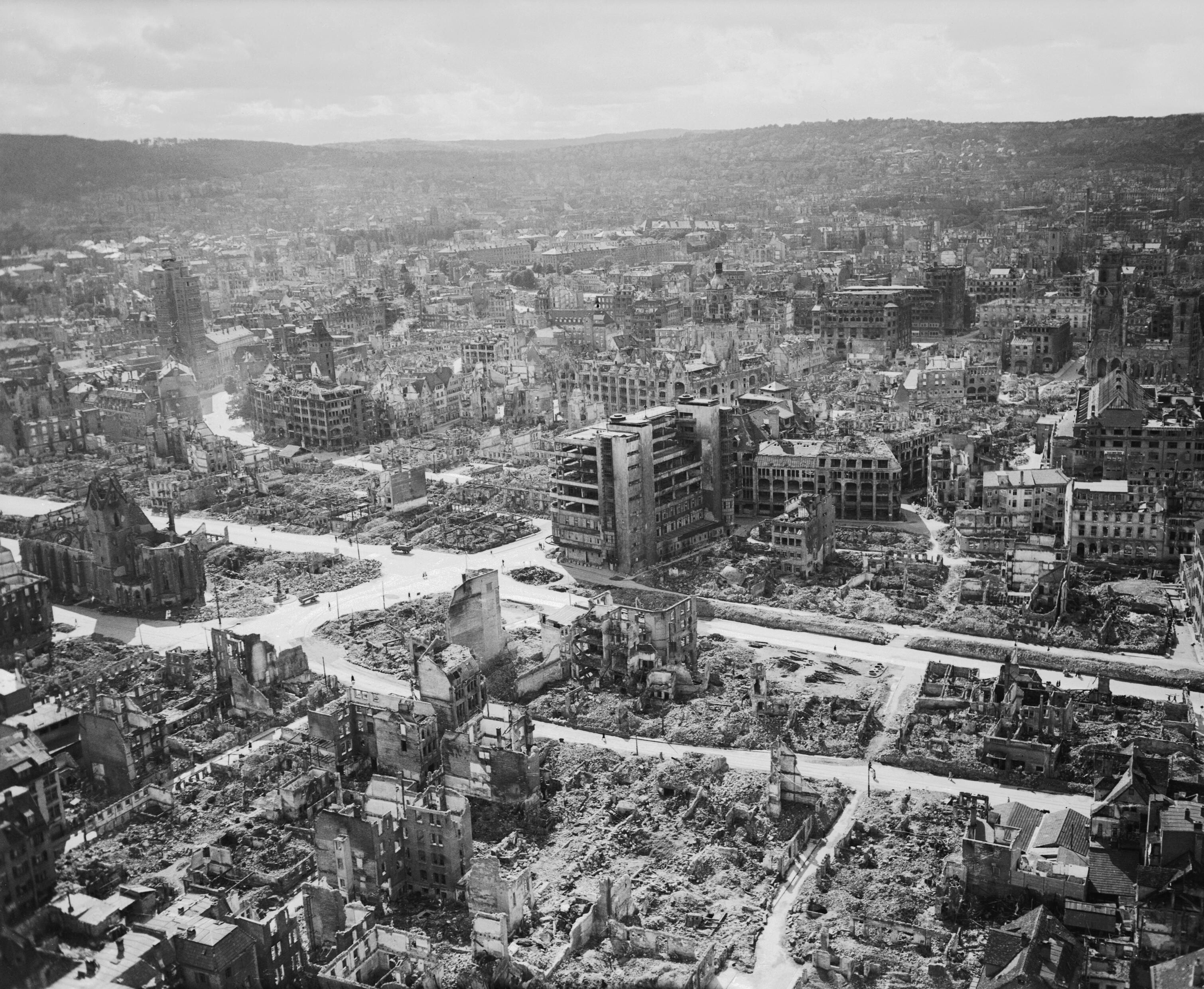
World War II RAF photograph of the devastated Stuttgart city center

On the night of 4–5 May 1942, Stuttgart endured its first large-scale attack, as 121 RAF bombers conducted a strategic bombing of the city to destroy the Bosch factory, which produced components for the Luftwaffe. Extremely dense cloud coverage of the city foiled the raid, and the flotilla's bombs were scattered over the city, though a decoy site at Lauffen am Neckar was hit. Not a single bomb struck the Bosch factory but 13 civilians were killed and 37 more were injured. One Stirling was lost. The next night, another 77 bombers marshaled against Stuttgart but again were troubled by poor visibility, as the city was obscured by haze. The closest bombs came was the Kräherwald to the west of the city, and three Wellingtons and another Stirling were lost. Another raid was launched on the night of 6–7 May containing 97 aircraft, but the crews again could not identify Stuttgart and instead attacked the Lauffen decoy, which may have led the flotilla to Heilbronn, 20 miles (32 km) away, where seven civilians were killed and more than 150 buildings were destroyed.

On the night of 22–23 November 1942, 222 bombers made for Stuttgart, but the city was obscured by clouds and the Pathfinders could not identify the city center. The southern districts of the city, namely Rohr, in Vaihingen, Plieningen, and Möhringen were heavily bombed; 88 houses were destroyed and another 334 severely damaged, and 28 people were killed and another 71 injured. In total, thirty tonnes of bombs had been dropped on the city.

Several months later on 11 March 1943, a massive fleet of 314 RAF bombers arrived at Stuttgart. Pathfinder units claimed to have spotted the city, but most of the bombs dropped that night fell in open country and on dummy Pathfinder indicators, the first use thereof by the Germans, but still 112 died and 386 were injured when Vaihingen and Kaltental were hit, resulting in the destruction of 118 houses. Six Halifaxes, three Stirlings, and two Lancasters, 3.5% of the total force, were lost during the operation. The next month, 462 bombers marshaled against Stuttgart and again the Pathfinders claimed to have accurately identified Stuttgart, but the actual bombardment occurred to the northeast of the city. This mission proved a costly failure, as eight Stirlings and Wellingtons, four Halifaxes, and three Lancasters were lost. That October, the RAF changed gears and sent a force of 343 Lancasters for a nighttime attack with the 101st Squadron equipped with the "Airborne Cigar" jamming device and supplemented with several diversionary flights, all together ensuring that only four Luftwaffe night fighters made their way to Stuttgart by the end of the raid. For a loss of only four Lancasters, the raid was a massive success, killing 104 civilians and injuring 300 more. A further 31 deaths and 156 injuries were sustained the next month on 26 November 1943, as a diversionary force of 178 bombers conducted a scattered raid on Stuttgart to draw night fighters away from Berlin for a cost of six Halifaxes lost to the Luftwaffe.

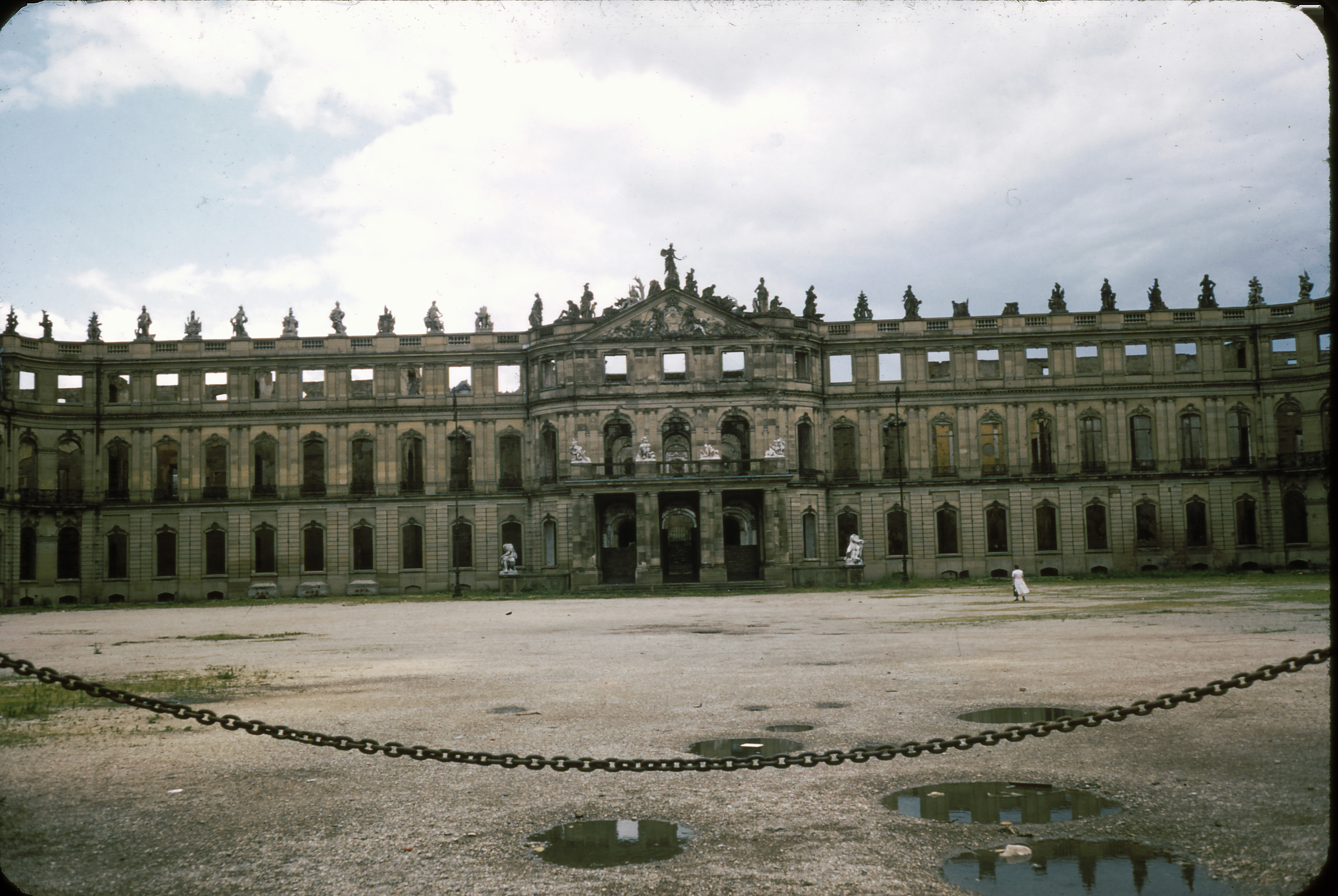
1956 photo of the New Palace, destroyed during the war

On the morning of 6 September 1943, 388 B-17 Flying Fortresses gathered over southern England and the English Channel, bound for Stuttgart to destroy its industrial sector, where American intelligence in 1943 estimated 90% of Germany's magnetos and fuel injection nozzles were being produced. A fifth of this flotilla aborted because of the weather or mechanical failure, leaving the remainder of the formation to carry on into France, where it began splitting into different diversionary flights to draw away the staffeln from Jagdgeschwader 2. This was the first daylight attack on Stuttgart, the United States Army Air Force's first attack on Stuttgart, and the eleventh raid on the city. Of the 262 B-17s that made it to Stuttgart, 45 were lost. Two airmen were killed on the operation while a further 333 went missing in action.

As the bombers flew over Cambrai, a number of Luftwaffe fighters attacked the formation and exchanged blows with its escorting P-47 Thunderbolts before ceasing their action at 8:44 AM. At this time, the escorting P-47s signaled that they were running low on fuel and had to return to base, meaning that the bombers would be on their own until they returned to current Allied fighter range. After a short period of calm, Luftwaffe fighter aircraft of every make and unit (even some Ju 87 Stuka dive bombers) descended upon the force, inflicting high casualties for some losses. These attacks abruptly ceased when the bomber flotilla arrived over Stuttgart, where the city's anti-air Flak cannons began to open fire on the bombers. Unfortunately for the Americans, the Stratus clouds covering the city that day were impossible for the men operating their respective Norden bombsights to spot through, forcing the various bomber groups, under the command of Brigadier General Robert F. Travis, to circle over the city three times with their bomb bay doors open, slowly using up fuel and being subjected to the German anti-aircraft guns. Before the fourth run, the 96th and 388th Bomb Groups began leaving to attack the secondary objective of Strasburg, but again failed to spot it and instead deposited their bombs into the Black Forest. Moments later, Luftwaffe fighters returned to engage the bombers, and would continue to harry them until they returned to fighter range. 45 bombers were lost during the mission, and the American doctrine of daylight precision bombing would die after the second raid on Schweinfurt later that year. In Stuttgart, 108 had been killed and 165 injured.

Out of 21 crews from the 388th crew to embark on the mission, dubbed by the unit as "Black Monday," 13 returned.

On 3 November 1943, Arthur Harris listed Stuttgart among 19 cities he claimed had been "seriously damaged" in a report of Bomber Command's activities to Prime Minister Winston Churchill.

=== 1944 ===
The most devastating year of the war for Stuttgart opened with a massive British attack against the city on 21 February 1944 by 598 bombers, losing only seven Lancasters and a single Halifax to German action thanks to two diversionary flights over the North Sea and to Munich two hours prior. Over the next two nights, a total of 27 Mosquito night fighters made flights to Stuttgart.

On 25 February 1944, in the final mission of the Big Week, 268 B-17 Flying Fortresses of the 1st Bombardment Division were launched to attack Augsburg and Stuttgart. 50 bombers of that formation struck the latter.

Stuttgart's luck ran out with three raids in five nights in mid-July 1944. 514 RAF bombers appeared over the city center on 25 July and caused immense damage for the loss of 21 planes. The RAF returned the next night with 550 bombers and annihilated the city center in the most successful attack against Stuttgart of the war. 12 planes were lost during the operation. A reconnaissance flight of 30 Mosquitoes passed over the city on 28 July without loss, and were followed by the third and final July 1944 attack. On 28–29 July, 494 Lancasters and two Mosquitoes, from RAF Groups Nos. 1, 3, 5 and 8, took off to attack Stuttgart. Lack of cloud cover left the bomber stream exposed to elements of Nachtjagdgeschwader 2, who intercepted and shot down 39 Lancasters – 19% of the force total. However the July raids had been devastating; nearly 1000 people had been killed and over 100,000 displaced. Among the dozens of buildings destroyed was the Nazi Party headquarters in the city.

On the night of 12–13 September, 204 Lancasters and 13 Mosquitoes from Groups Nos. 1 and 5 attacked Stuttgart. For the cost of 4 Lancasters, a firestorm was effected in the city.

Four Mosquitoes flew over Stuttgart on 13–14 October. Later in the month, on 565 Lancasters and 18 Mosquitoes from Groups Nos. 1, 3, 6, and 8 attacked Stuttgart in two forces on the night of 19–20 October. Six Lancasters were lost while immense damage was dealt to the central and eastern sections of the city. Among the buildings hit was the Bosch works.

The next month, 65 Mosquitoes attacked Stuttgart in two waves on 5–6 November, followed by another 29 Mosquitoes on 21–22 November. Nine more Mosquitoes visited the city on 25–26 November. No planes were lost from any of these raids.

=== 1945 ===
Stuttgart was attacked twice on the night of 28–29 January 1945 by a force of 602 aircraft. In the first attack, 226 planes bombed the railyards of Kornwestheim, north of the city. Three hours later, the second force appeared over Zuffenhausen to destroy what had been identified as the Hirth aircraft engine factory. The target was obscured by clouds and as a result the actual bombing was scattered. Bombs fell across northern Stuttgart, exploding in Feuerbach, where the Bosch plant was hit, and Weilimdorf. 11 aircraft were lost in the RAF's last major attack against Stuttgart.

== Legacy ==
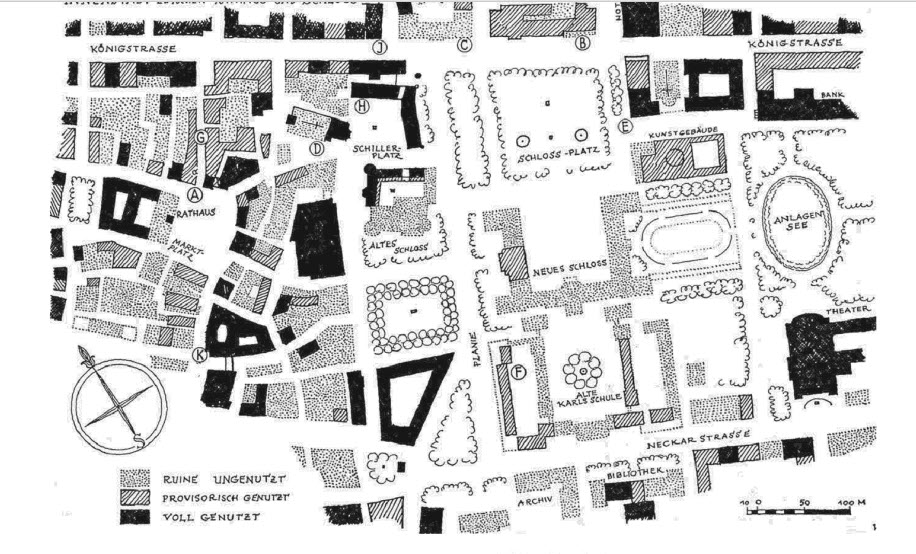
A sketch of the destruction in the city center by Walter Kittel, dated 1950

In totality, 53 air raids were launched against Stuttgart by the United States Army Air Force and the Royal Air Force. The latter conducted carpet bombing of civilian targets in Stuttgart according to the Area bombing directive of 14 February 1942. 4562 German citizens were killed, (Note: Jörg Friedrich specifies in The Fire that 4,477 of those citizens were residents of the city of Stuttgart.) as were 770 foreigners, most of whom were forced laborers. An estimated 300 aircraft and 2400 Allied personnel were lost. 68% of Stuttgart's center was destroyed.

A total of 27,000 tons of bombs fell on Stuttgart; 20,000 high explosive bombs and 1.3 million incendiary devices. An estimated 12000 bombs remain undetonated in the city limits. On 4 June 2014, a residential area near Degerloch and Sillenbuch, was evacuated so that police could disarm two 250 kg (550 lb) bombs.

The 15,000,000 cubic meters (530,000,000 ft^{3}) cubic meters of rubble leftover from the war was gathered on the Birkenkopf from 1953 to 1957 to form a Schuttberg. On 9 August 2018, a monument to two teenage Flakhelfer was unveiled at the cemetery in Degerloch, a municipality of Stuttgart.

Canadian painter Carl Schaefer, then a member of the Royal Canadian Air Force as a war artist, depicted No. 6 Squadron RAF as it prepared to leave to bomb Stuttgart on 7 October 1943. Schaefer used the date in the watercolor painting Marshalling Lancasters Against Stuttgart, 7 October 1943, though he most likely finished the piece later. This piece would become one of five of his works to be put on public exhibition.

Bombing of Stuttgart during World War II
#	Date and time	Area(s) damaged	Casualties	Force
1	25 August 1940; 00:16–01:24	Gaisburg, Stuttgart-East; Untertürkheim	Four killed, five injured.	Est. 20 planes
2	8 November 1940; 21:16–24:00	Stuttgart-Center	None killed, three injured	Est. 20 planes
3	10 February 1941; 00:28–01:43	Castle Solitude	No casualties	One plane
4	5 May 1942 (Note: 5 May 1942 was the first large-scale air raid launched against Stuttgart.); 00:33–02:43	Zuffenhausen; Bad Cannstatt	13 killed, 37 injured	121 planes: 69 Wellingtons, 19 Hampdens, 14 Lancasters, 12 Stirlings, 7 Halifaxes
5	6 May 1942; 01:51–01:53	Kräherwald	No casualties	77 planes: 49 Wellingtons, 13 Stirlings, 11 Halifaxes, 4 Lancasters
6	29 August 1942; 01:45	Dinkelacker brewery, Stuttgart-South	No casualties	One plane
7	22 November 1942; 21:30–22:45	Rohr, Vaihingen; Möhringen; Plieningen	28 killed, 71 injured	222 planes: 97 Lancasters, 59 Wellingtons, 39 Halifaxes, 27 Stirlings.
8	11 March 1943; 22:46–23:50	Vaihingen; Kaltental, Stuttgart-South	112 killed, 386 injured	314 planes: 152 Lancasters, 109 Halifaxes, 53 Stirlings.
9	15 April 1943; 00:42–01:52	Bad Cannstatt; Münster; Mühlhausen	619 killed, 705 injured; 400 prisoners of war killed in Gaisburg	462 planes: 146 Wellingtons, 135 Halifaxes, 98 Lancasters, 83 Stirlings.
10	17 April 1943; 01:10	Stuttgart-West	One killed, 58 injured	One plane
11 (Note: This was the United States Army Air Force's first day-time attack on Stuttgart.)	6 September 1943; 10:44–11:10	Stuttgart-West; Stuttgart-South	107 killed, 165 injured	262 planes: All Boeing B-17s
12	8 October 1943; 00:02–00:53	Karlshöhe, Stuttgart-South	104 killed, 300 injured	343 planes: All Lancasters
13	26 November 1943; 20:25–21:12	Bad Cannstatt; Untertürkheim; Daimler plant	31 killed, 156 injured	178 planes: 157 Halifaxes, 21 Lancasters.
14	21 February 1944; 03:57–05:09	Bad Cannstatt; Feuerbach	160 killed, 977 injured	598 planes: 460 Lancasters, 126 Halifaxes, 12 Mosquitoes.
15	25 February 1944; 14:25–15:00	Feuerbach; Bad Cannstatt;	10 killed, 56 injured	50 planes: All B-17s
16	2 March 1944; 02:51–04:01	Bad Cannstatt; the New Palace	125 killed, 510 injured	557 planes: 415 Lancasters, 129 Halifaxes, 13 Mosquitoes
17	15 March 1944; 23:10–00:13	Vaihingen, Möhringen	86 killed, 203 injured	863 planes: 617 Lancasters, 230 Halifaxes, 16 Mosquitoes
18	28 April 1944; 01:50–02:20	Stuttgart-Center; Feuerbach; Bad Cannstatt	None killed, 9 injured	13 planes
19	16 July 1944; 10:09–10:25	Bad Cannstatt; Winterhalde	42 killed, 94 injured	Est. 100 planes
20	21 July 1944; 11:04–11:12	Zuffenhausen	31 killed, 29 injured	25 planes
21	25 July 1944; 01:35–02:10	Stuttgart-Center	884 killed, 1916 injured, 14 missing during the period of July 25 to July 29	614 planes: 461 Lancasters, 153 Halifaxes
22	26 July 1944; 01:38–02:35	Stuttgart-Center	see 25 July	550 planes: 412 Lancasters, 138 Halifaxes
23	28 July 1944; 01:22–01:50	Surrounding area; Stuttgart-North	see 25 July	30 planes: All Mosquitoes
24	29 July 1944; 01:48–02:30	Feuerbach; Botnang; Ostheim and Gablenberg, Stuttgart-East	see 25 July	496 planes: 494 Lancasters, 2 Mosquitoes
25	5 September 1944; 11:15–11:54	Untertürkheim; Wangen	37 killed, 70 injured	Est. 200 planes
26	10 September 1944; 11:21–11:40	Zuffenhausen; Feuerbach; Stammheim	28 killed, 113 injured	Est. 200 planes
27	12 September 1944; 22:59–23:30	Stuttgart-West	957 killed, 1600 injured	217 planes: 204 Lancasters, 13 Mosquitoes
28	3 October 1944; 22:01	Weilimdorf	No casualties	One plane
29	14 October 1944; 04:35–04:56	Zuffenhausen	Two killed, 40 injured	Four planes: All Mosquitoes
30 (Note: 19 October 1944 was the first double attack on Stuttgart.)	19 October 1944; 20:25–21:10	Bad Cannstatt; Feuerbach; Gaisburg	No casualties	Unknown
31	19 October 1944; 00:55–01:38	Bad Cannstatt; Feuerbach; Gaisburg	338 killed, 872 injured	583 planes: 565 Lancasters and 18 Mosquitoes
32	5 November 1944; 20:00–20:30	Bad Cannstatt; Münster	24 killed 46 injured	132 planes
33	5 November 1944; 23:32–23:48	Bad Cannstatt; Münster	See last entry	65 planes: All Mosquitoes
34	21 November 1944; 19:10–19:16	Stuttgart-South	One killed, one injured	29 planes: All Mosquitoes
35	26 November 1944; 01:57–02:00	Bad Cannstatt	None killed, 10 injured	Nine planes: All Mosquitoes
36	4 December 1944; 14:48	Hofen, Mühlhausen	One killed, two injured	One plane
37	9 December 1944; 12:25–13:15	Bad Cannstatt	24 killed, 55 injured	Est. 350 planes
38	11 December 1944; 11:51–11:52	Untertürkheim	Three killed, 11 injured	Four planes
39	7 January 1945; 21:49	Feuerbach	No casualties	Unknown
40	20 January 1945; 11:50–12:05	Bad Cannstatt	One killed, 12 injured	Est. 30 planes
41	21 January 1945; 12:58–13:00	Münster; Hofen	No casualties	12 planes
42 (Note: The raids of 28–29 January 1945 were the final large-scale RAF attack on Stuttgart.)	28 January 1945; 20:35–20:54	Feuerbach; Weilimdorf; Botnang	No casualties	226 planes
43	28 January 1945; 23:30–23:48	Feuerbach; Weilimdorf; Botnang	123 killed, 78 injured	376 planes
44	1 February 1945; 19:47	Bad Cannstatt	None killed, 13 injured	One plane
45	12 February 1945; 19:30–19:46	Bad Cannstatt	68 killed, 139 injured	Est. 30 planes
46	3 March 1945; 14:32–14:42	Stuttgart-North	One killed, one injured	Est. Eight planes
47	4 March 1945; 10:20–10:28	Bad Cannstatt; Stuttgart-West	50 killed, 135 injured	Est. 40 planes
48	9 March 1945; 15:02–15:03	Bad Cannstatt	None killed, four injured	Est. 150 planes
49	12 March 1945; 21:02	Feuerbach	Six killed, 11 injured	One plane
50	25 March 1945; 07:55	Weilimdorf	No casualties	Two planes
51	25 March 1945; 13:35–13:37	Stammheim; Zuffenhausen	None killed, four injured	Eight planes
52	1 April 1945; 07:17–09:45	Weilimdorf	Two killed, 16 injured	Eight planes
53	19 April 1945; 22:12	Stuttgart-North	One killed, seven injured	One plane
