= Döhring =

Döhring is a surname. Notable people with the surname include:

- Clara Döhring (1899–1987), German politician
- Karl Döhring (1879–1941), German architect, art historian, and archaeologist
- Sieghart Döhring (born 1939), German musicologist and opera researcher

== See also ==
- Dohring, another surname
