= Simone Fischer =

German politician (born 1979)

Simone Fischer MdB
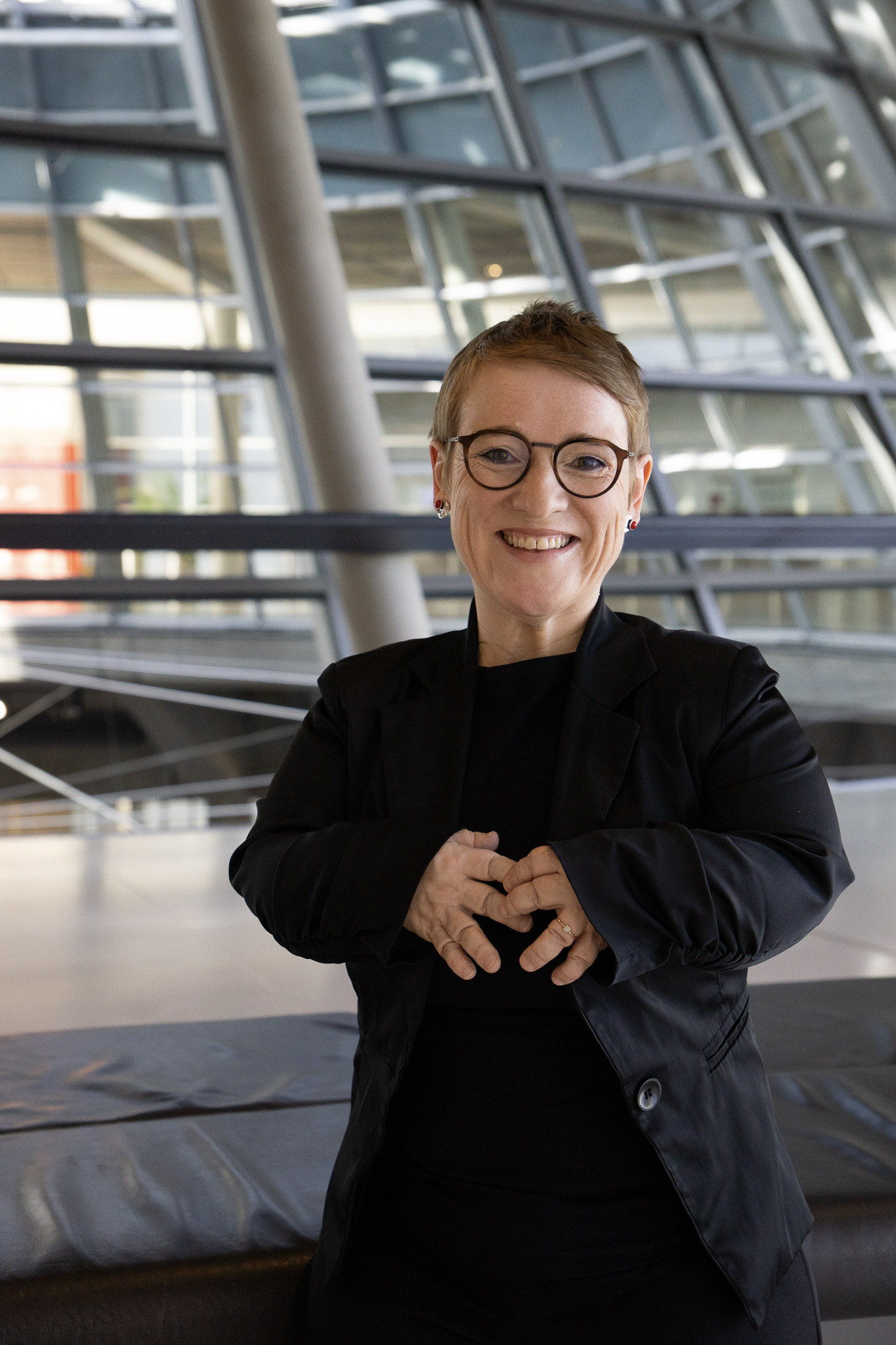
- Fischer in 2026

Member of the Bundestag; for Stuttgart I
- Incumbent
- Assumed office 25 March 2025
- Preceded by: Cem Özdemir

Personal details
- Born: 24 June 1979 (age 47) Buchen, Germany
- Party: Alliance 90/The Greens
- Education: Kehl University

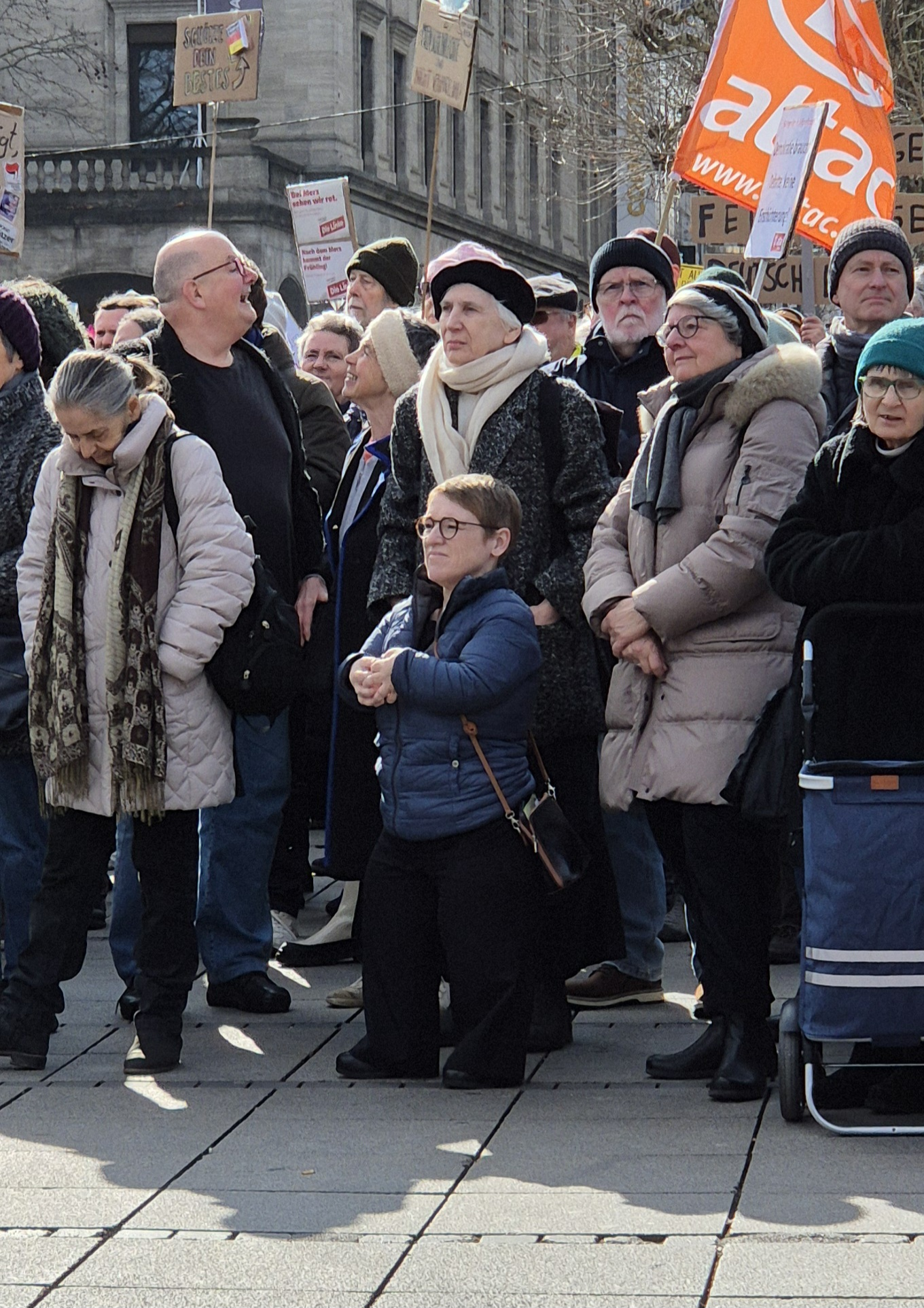
Simone Fischer (2025) in Stuttgart, participating in protest against right wing politics

Simone Fischer (born 24 June 1979) is a German politician from the Alliance 90/The Greens. She has been a member of the German Bundestag since the 2025 German federal election.

== Life ==
Simone Fischer grew up in the Neckar-Odenwald district. After graduating from high school, she studied public administration at Kehl University and subsequently held various positions in the social and healthcare sectors of the city of Stuttgart.

Since 2021, she has been the Baden-Württemberg State Government’s Commissioner for the Concerns of People with Disabilities.

She lives with her partner in the west of Stuttgart. Fischer has dwarfism.

== Political career ==
Since 2024, Simone Fischer has been a Green City Councillor in the Stuttgart City Council.

In the 2025 German federal election, Fischer ran in the Stuttgart I constituency. She won this constituency as well as a direct mandate with 28.3%, a margin of only 5 votes.

== Other activities ==
- Rotary International, Member
