= Cem Özdemir =

German politician, Minister-President of Baden-Württemberg since 2026 (born 1965)

Cem Özdemir MdL MdBR
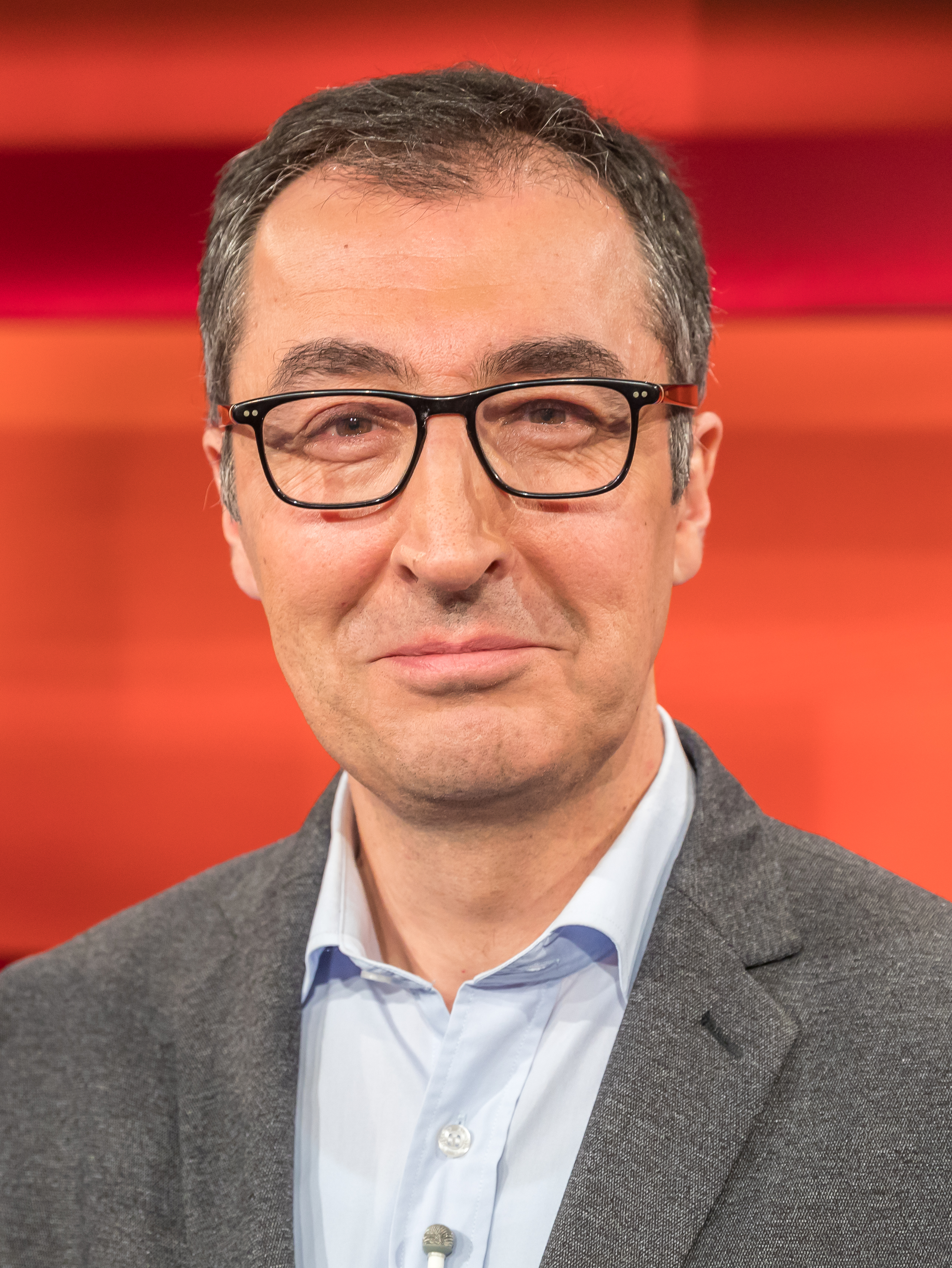
- Özdemir in 2020

Minister-President of Baden-Württemberg
- Incumbent
- Assumed office 13 May 2026
- Deputy: Manuel Hagel
- Preceded by: Winfried Kretschmann

Leader of Alliance 90/The Greens
- In office 15 November 2008 – 27 January 2018 Serving with Claudia Roth and Simone Peter
- Preceded by: Reinhard Bütikofer
- Succeeded by: Robert Habeck
Ministerial offices
Minister of Food and Agriculture
In office 8 December 2021 – 6 May 2025
Chancellor	Olaf Scholz
Preceded by	Julia Klöckner
Succeeded by	Alois Rainer
Minister of Education and Research
In office 7 November 2024 – 6 May 2025
Chancellor	Olaf Scholz
Preceded by	Bettina Stark-Watzinger
Succeeded by	Karin Prien (Education); Dorothee Bär (Research)
Parliamentary offices
Member of the Bundestag for Baden-Württemberg
In office 26 October 2021 – 25 March 2025
Preceded by	Stefan Kaufmann
Succeeded by	Simone Fischer
Constituency	Stuttgart I
In office 22 October 2013 – 26 October 2021
Constituency	Alliance 90/The Greens List
In office 10 November 1994 – 17 October 2002
Constituency	Alliance 90/The Greens List
Member of the European Parliament for Germany
In office 13 June 2004 – 7 June 2009
Constituency	Alliance 90/The Greens List

Member of the Landtag of Baden-Württemberg for Stuttgart II
- Incumbent
- Assumed office 12 May 2026
- Preceded by: Winfried Hermann

Personal details
- Born: 21 December 1965 (age 60) Bad Urach, Baden-Württemberg, Germany
- Party: The Greens (since 1981)
- Spouses: Pia María Castro (m. 2003; div. 2023) Flavia Zaka (m. 2026)
- Children: 2
- Education: Protestant University of Applied Sciences Ludwigsburg

Cem Özdemir (German: [ˈdʒɛm ˈœsdemiːɐ̯]; Turkish: [ˈdʒem ˈœzdemiɾ]; born 21 December 1965) is a German politician serving as Minister-President of Baden-Württemberg since 2026. He served as Federal Minister of Food and Agriculture in the cabinet of Olaf Scholz from December 2021 to May 2025. From November 2024 to May 2025 he additionally served as Federal Minister of Education and Research, making him the first federal minister in Germany with Circassian ancestry. After his party's victory in the 2026 Baden-Württemberg state election, he became minister-president of this state. Özdemir became the first Minister-President of Turkish background.

Between 2008 and 2018, Özdemir co-chaired The Greens together with Claudia Roth and later Simone Peter. He has been a Member of the German Bundestag since 2013, having previously served from 1994 to 2002, when he became one of the first two Bundestag members of Circassian descent. From 2004 to 2009 he served as a Member of the European Parliament. In the 2017 federal election Özdemir and Katrin Göring-Eckardt ran jointly as The Greens’ lead candidates.

== Early life ==
Özdemir was born in Urach, Baden-Württemberg, West Germany. His father Abdullah Özdemir (died 2015) came from the town of Pazar in the Turkish province of Tokat and belonged to the Circassian minority in Turkey. He immigrated to Germany as a Gastarbeiter ("guest worker") in 1963 and worked in a textile factory in the Black Forest. Özdemir's mother Nihal (died 2021) came to Germany from Istanbul in 1964, and ran her own tailoring shop. Her father was an officer in the Turkish War of Independence. In 1983 Özdemir and his parents acquired German citizenship.

After completing secondary school Realschule in Urach, Özdemir completed an apprenticeship, becoming an early childhood educator. He later studied social pedagogy at the Evangelical University of Applied Science in Reutlingen (now the Protestant University of Applied Sciences Ludwigsburg), graduating in 1994. While studying, he worked as an educator and a freelance journalist.

Özdemir describes himself as a "secular Muslim" and was married to Argentine journalist Pía María Castro. They have two children: a son and a daughter. In November 2023 the couple announced that they had separated. Özdemir's partner since 2024 is the Canadian specialist for environmental and human rights issues, Flavia Zaka. The couple married on 14 February 2026 in Tübingen with the Tübingen mayor Boris Palmer presiding. Özdemir is a vegetarian.

== Political career ==
=== Beginnings ===
Özdemir has been a member of the Green Party since 1981, originally in the district chapter of Ludwigsburg. Between 1989 and 1994 he was a member in the State Executive (Landesvorstand) of the Green Party in Baden-Württemberg. During that time he was one of the founding members of Immi-Grün – Bündnis der neuen InländerInnen, an alliance of InländerInnen (locals), as opposed to the German word Ausländer (foreigners).

=== Member of the German Bundestag, 1994–2002 ===
From 1994 until 2002, Özdemir was a member of the German Bundestag; along with Leyla Onur of the Social Democrats, he was the first person of either Turkish or Circassian descent ever elected to the country's federal parliament. From 1998 until 2002, he was a member of the Committee on Home Affairs and served as his parliamentary group's spokesperson on this issue. In this capacity, he advocated for reforms to Germany's citizenship laws. In addition, he was the chairman of the German-Turkish Parliamentary Friendship Group. (See list of the German Parliamentary Friendship Groups and the pages from the German Bundestag website that describes their purpose Deutscher Bundestag - Weltweit vernetzt - die Parlamentariergruppen and their membership as at January 2024 .

In 1999, nine months after the Greens for the first time joined a German federal government under Chancellor Gerhard Schröder, Özdemir was among 40 younger party members of the self-described "youth of the second generation" who declared in a controversial manifesto "[that] we cannot and will not idly watch the moralizing know-it-alls in our party from the founding generation" around Jürgen Trittin.

In 2002, Özdemir was accused of violating parliamentary regulations for retaining "Miles & More" frequent-flier miles accrued during official travel as a member of the Bundestag for personal use. He was also criticised for having taken out a credit with Moritz Hunzinger, a German PR consultant and lobbyist, in order to overcome personal financial issues. This affair was also associated with Rudolf Scharping, former German Minister of Defence (1998–2002). Subsequently, Özdemir resigned as spokesman for domestic affairs and as a member of the Bundestag.

In 2003, Özdemir joined the German Marshall Fund of the United States in Washington, D.C., and Brussels as a Transatlantic Fellow. During his fellowship he gave various speeches and brown bag lectures at the University of Wisconsin-Madison, on the issue of Turkey and Europe. He also researched on the ways that minority groups in the United States and Europe organize themselves politically.

=== Member of the European Parliament, 2004–2009 ===
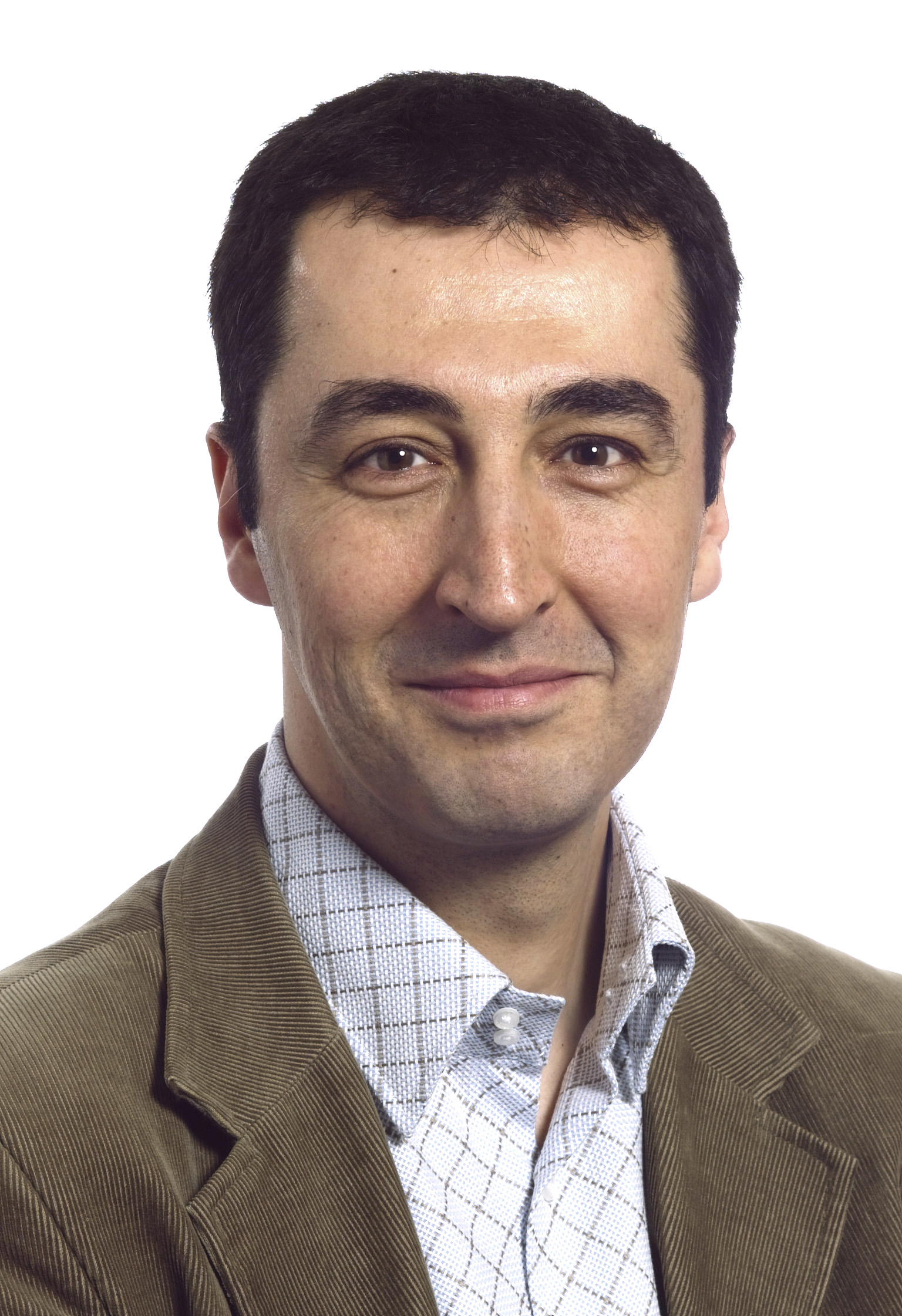
Özdemir's 2004 portrait as a Member of the European Parliament

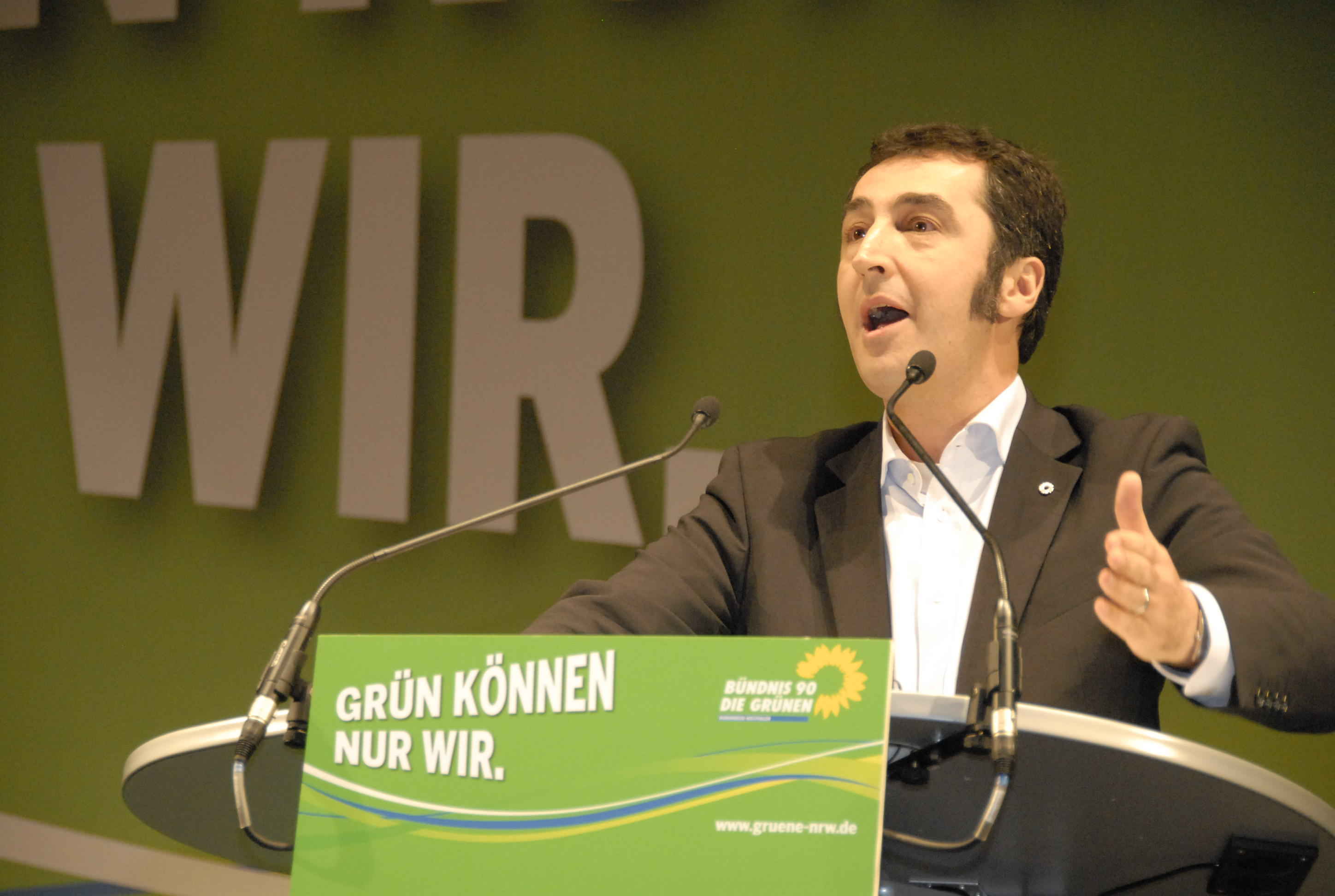
Özdemir in 2009

From 2004 until 2009, Özdemir was a Member of the European Parliament in the parliamentary group The Greens/European Free Alliance (Greens/EFA). During that time he served as the group's spokesperson on foreign policy and a member of the Committee on Foreign Affairs (AFET). In addition, he served as the European Parliament's rapporteur on Central Asia and as vice chair of the Permanent Ad Hoc Delegation for Relations with Iraq.

Between 2006 and 2007, Özdemir also served as vice president of the "CIA Committee" (Temporary Committee on the alleged use of European countries by the CIA for the transport and illegal detention of prisoners).

=== Co-chair of the Green Party, 2009–2013 ===
On 2 June 2008, Özdemir announced his candidacy as co-chair of his party. Özdemir's rival candidate was Volker Ratzmann, leader of the Green parliamentary group in the Berlin House of Representatives, who eventually withdrew his candidacy on 4 September 2008 for personal reasons.

In the run-up to the party co-chair elections, Özdemir also ran for a promising party list position for the 2009 German elections at the federal state party conference of Baden-Württemberg. In two separate runs he lost to his respective direct opponents. Nevertheless, Özdemir adhered to his candidacy for the party chairmanship.

Since 15 November 2008, Özdemir has been one of two co-chairs of Alliance 90/The Greens. He received 79.2 percent of the delegate votes.

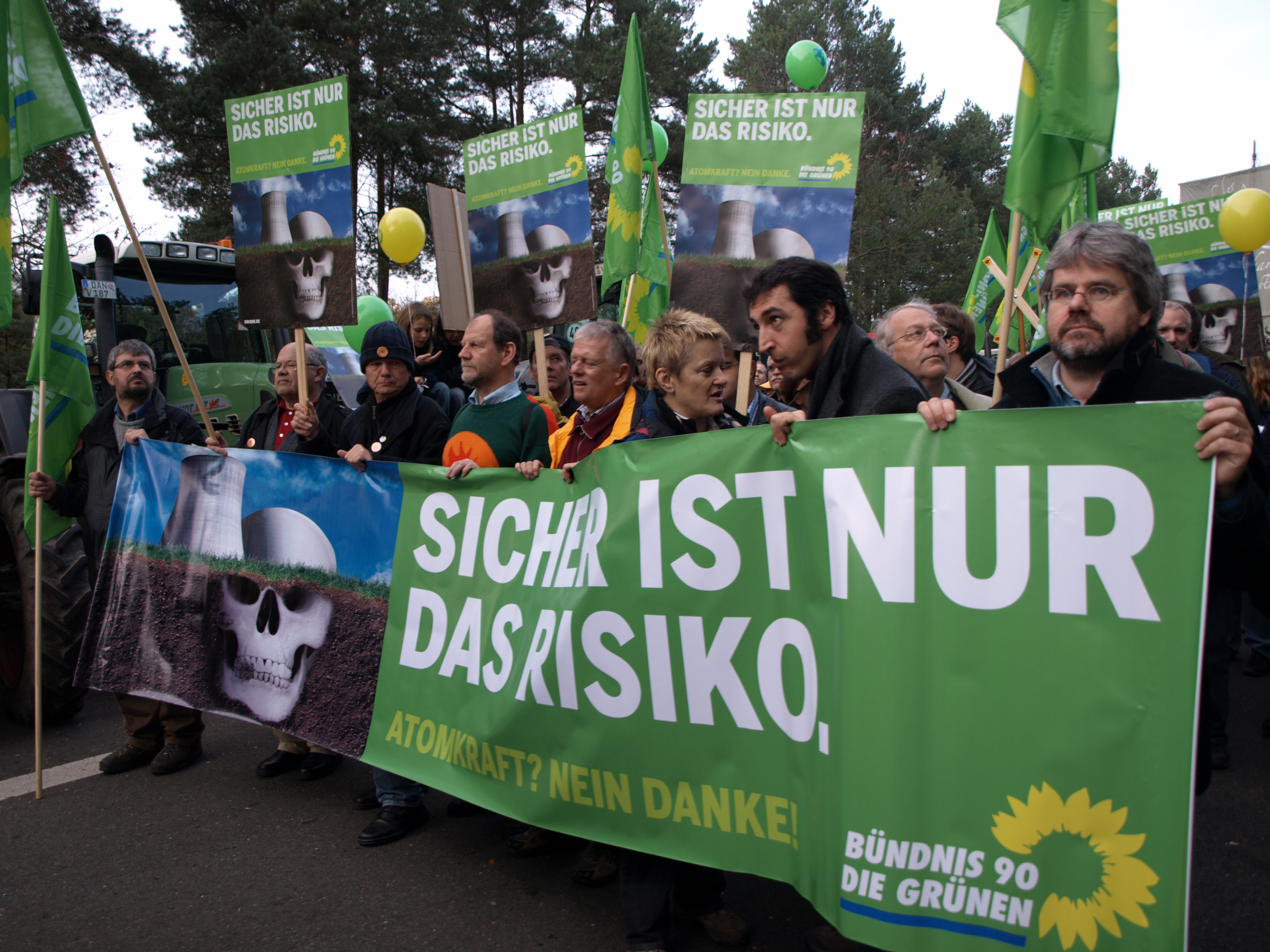
Anti-nuclear protest near nuclear waste disposal centre at Gorleben in northern Germany on 8 November 2008

In the 2009 elections, Özdemir was not elected to the Bundestag. As a candidate in the constituency of Stuttgart I, which covers south Stuttgart he polled 29.9%, but lost to Stefan Kaufmann, the candidate of the CDU.

=== Member of the German Bundestag, 2013–2025 ===
Özdemir re-entered the Bundestag as a result of the 2013 elections. He served as deputy chairman of the German-Chinese Parliamentary Friendship Group. In 2017, Özdemir ran for the male top candidacy of the Greens in the subsequent federal election and narrowly won the party membership election over Schleswig-Holstein Deputy Minister-President Robert Habeck and Bundestag parliamentary leader Anton Hofreiter by only 75 votes. He led the Greens into the federal election alongside parliamentary leader Katrin Göring-Eckardt. Following the election, the Greens were first expected to form a government with the CDU and the FDP, in which Özdemir was widely expected to become the Minister of Foreign Affairs. However, when the FDP abruptly ended the negotiations, this fell apart. Özdemir had already declared not to stand for reelection as party leader (with Robert Habeck succeeding him), and the parliamentary leadership had been reelected directly after the federal election, so there was no leadership post left for him. Instead, from 2018 until 2021, he chaired the Bundestag Committee on Transport. Nevertheless, Özdemir remained one of the most popular politicians of the country and at times even was the most popular politician, placed before Angela Merkel.

In September 2019, Özdemir unsuccessfully challenged incumbents Katrin Göring-Eckardt and Anton Hofreiter at the middle of the legislative term and announced his candidacy to co-chair the Green Party's parliamentary group, together with Kirsten Kappert-Gonther. Following the announcement of Fritz Kuhn to not seek re-election as Mayor of Stuttgart in 2020, Özdemir was widely considered a potential successor. Shortly after, he decided not to run for the position. In the negotiations to form a coalition government under the leadership of Minister-President of Baden-Württemberg Winfried Kretschmann following the 2021 state elections, Özdemir was a member of the working group on economic affairs, labor and innovation.

In May 2021, several months ahead of the national elections, various media outlets reported that Özdemir had been late to declare to the German Parliament's administration a total of €20,580 in additional income he had received over the course of five years – 2014 through 2018 – in his capacity as leader of the Green Party. In the negotiations to form a so-called traffic light coalition of the Social Democrats (SPD), the Green Party and the FDP following the 2021 federal elections, Özdemir led his party's delegation in the working group on economic policy; his co-chairs from the other parties were Carsten Schneider and Michael Theurer.

=== Minister of Food and Agriculture, 2021–2025 ===
Following the 2021 German federal election, the Greens entered government as part of a traffic light coalition led by Social Democrat Chancellor Olaf Scholz, and Özdemir was sworn in as Food and Agriculture Minister on 8 December 2021. The appointment of Özdemir, instead of outgoing parliamentary leader and biologist Anton Hofreiter by the party leaders Robert Habeck and Annalena Baerbock came after infighting within the party over the Agriculture Ministry, and was seen as somewhat surprising, since he had no prior experience in agriculture policy and was considered to be a moderate within the Greens, while Hofreiter was left-leaning. However, Özdemir had also been one of the most prominent and popular politicians in Germany for several years.

Özdemir was the only minister in the Scholz cabinet to come from an ethnic minority, and the first government minister of Turkish descent in Germany's history.

In October 2023, Özdemir participated in the first joint cabinet retreat of the German and French governments in Hamburg, chaired by Scholz and President Emmanuel Macron.

In its ruling of 15 November 2023, the Federal Constitutional Court declared the second supplementary budget for 2021 as unconstitutional and therefore invalid. This resulted in a budget deficit of 17 billion euros for the 2024 federal budget. Özdemir announced one element of the government's response - the abolition of subsidies for agricultural diesel and the introduction of a vehicle tax for agricultural vehicles. This led to farmers' protests across the country.

=== Campaign for minister president of Baden Württemberg ===
In October 2024, SWR reported that Cem Özdemir wanted to become the Green Party's top candidate in the 8 March 2026 Baden-Württemberg state election. Özdemir has long been considered a candidate for this task within the party. He would succeed Winfried Kretschmann, who, as the only Green head of government in a German state, ruled the state for three five-year terms. Özdemir decided not to run for re-election in the 2025 federal election, instead choosing to run for the office of Minister-President in the 2026 state election in Baden-Württemberg, even though his party, Alliance 90/The Greens, was trailing the CDU by 11–14 percentage points in the polls at the time. However, Özdemir and his party caught up before the election on 8 March 2026 and ultimately won by a narrow margin. Özdemir himself achieved the best result of any politician in Baden-Württemberg in this election with his personal first votes in the Stuttgart II state constituency.

== Political positions ==
Within the Green Party, Özdemir is associated with the centrist "Realo" faction.

=== European integration ===
In 2011, Özdemir called for European Union citizens to get more direct influence in European affairs via plebiscites on key policy issues.

Amid the 2013 Cypriot financial crisis, Özdemir proposed making an EU bailout for Cyprus conditional on reviving talks about reunification of the island divided since 1974.

=== Relations with Belarus ===
On 16 December 2020, he undertook patronage over Katsiaryna Barysevich, Belarusian journalist and political prisoner. On 31 May 2021, he took over the godparenthood of Raman Pratasevich, Belarusian political prisoner.

=== Relations with Russia ===
In 2011, Özdemir stepped down from the Quadriga Award's board of trustees to protest the nonprofit group's decision to honor Prime Minister Vladimir Putin of Russia. The groups decision sparked a public outcry and the annual prize ceremony was later canceled. After a two-day visit to Armenia, Özdemir tweeted in reference to Armenia's recent accession into the Eurasian Economic Union that "The closer Yerevan moves towards Putin's Russia, the less freedom for media, NGOs, LGBT. People want open society."

=== Relations with Turkey ===
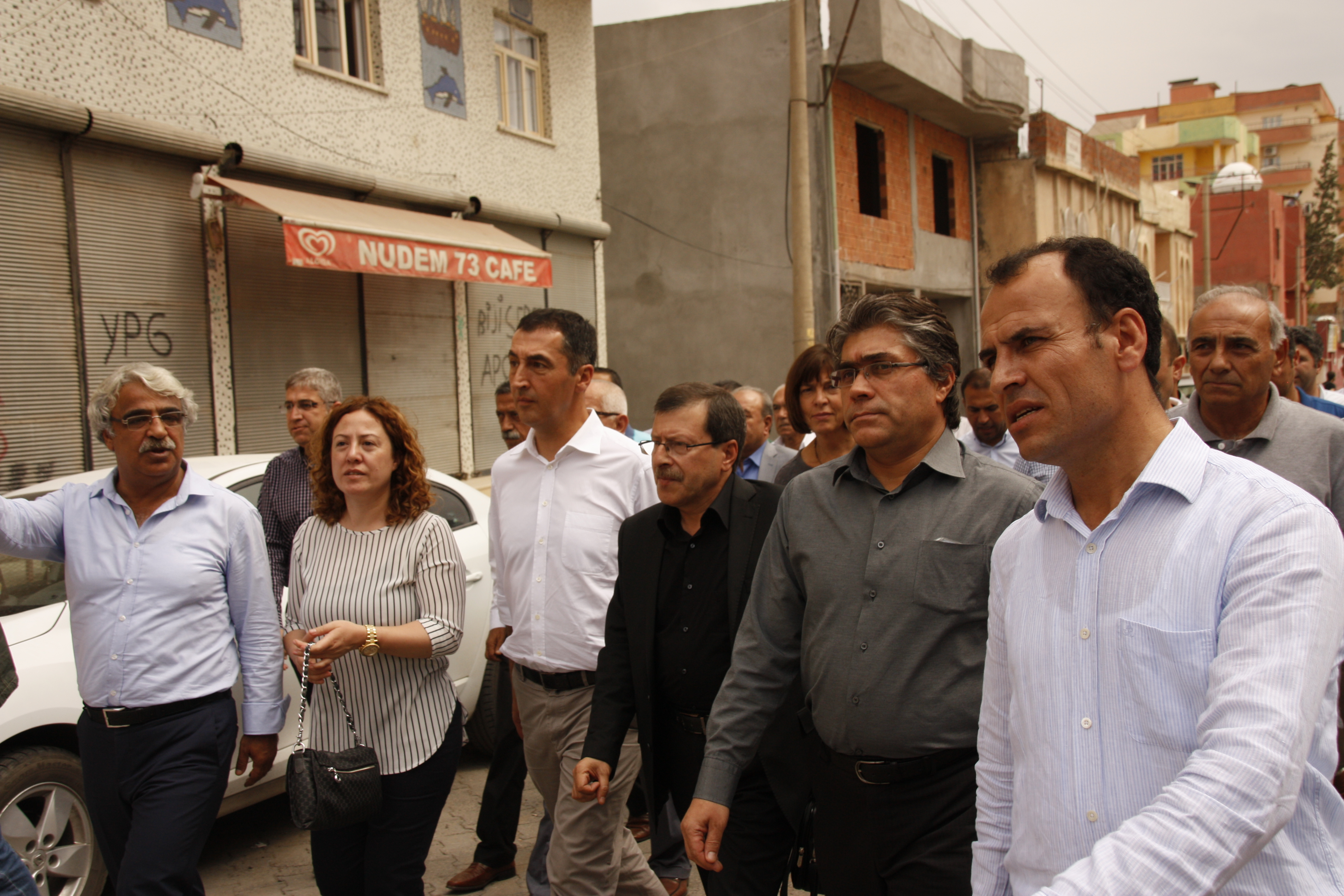
Özdemir in Turkey during the Şırnak clashes, 15 September 2015

Özdemir opposes the accession of Turkey to the European Union under President Erdogan. When Özdemir criticised Prime Minister Recep Tayyip Erdoğan of Turkey in a speech he delivered in Cologne in May 2014, Erdoğan personally targeted Özdemir during one of his party's group meetings in the parliament declaring him "a so-called Turk" and described his criticisms as "very ugly". Upon Erdoğan's attacks, the Turkish ambassador in Berlin, Hüseyin Avni Karslıoğlu, was summoned to the German Foreign Office and was informed about Germany's unease on the prime minister's remarks. Soon after, Özdemir told Spiegel Online it would be "irresponsible" for German intelligence services not to target Turkey given its location as a transit country for Islamic State of Iraq and the Levant militants from Europe.

Özdemir was a driving force behind the Bundestag's recognition of the Armenian Genocide in June 2016, which angered Turkey. He has also been critical of Turkey's mass arrests and crackdown on dissent following a failed coup attempt in July 2016. Özdemir condemned the Turkish invasion of northern Syria aimed at ousting U.S.-backed Syrian Kurds from the enclave of Afrin. He met with Turkish officials during the 2018 Munich Security Conference, during which he was reportedly called a "terrorist" and received various other threats from the Turkish delegation. As a result, Özdemir received special police protection.

=== Relations with Saudi Arabia ===
Özdemir called for the German government to stop giving contracts to the American consultancy firm McKinsey & Company, which was accused of gathering information for the Saudi Arabia's regime about its critics.

=== Armenian genocide ===
On 5 April 2001, in a statement published in the Frankfurter Allgemeine Zeitung newspaper, Özdemir said, "The German parliament should not follow in the footsteps of the French parliament and should not define the mass death of Armenians as genocide. It is not for parliaments to give official definitions to historical events. That is the job of historians. The Bundestag is not the authority to decide on the injustices of the past."

On 12 March 2015 Özdemir visited the Armenian Genocide memorial in Yerevan, Armenia and declared his formal recognition of the Armenian genocide and called on Turkey to recognize it as well. In an interview he stated: "I think that Germany should obviously refer to the Armenian genocide issue. As a friend of two countries, we should help to open the Armenian-Turkish border. As a friend of both countries, we should exert effort, so that the Armenian-Turkish relations become like the French-German or Polish-German relations."

In 2016 Özdemir initiated a resolution in the Bundestag that would formally classify the 1915 massacres as genocide. The resolution passed on 2 June 2016 with what Speaker Norbert Lammert called a "remarkable majority". At the time, Özdemir emphasized that the resolution was not designed to point fingers at others but rather to acknowledge Germany's partial responsibility for the genocide. In 1915, the German Empire was an ally of the Ottoman Empire and failed to condemn the violence. After the Bundestag's approval of the resolution, Turkish media "waged a war" against him and he received multiple death threats.

=== Legalisation of cannabis ===
Özdemir advocated legalising cannabis. In December 2014, his parliamentary immunity from prosecution was lifted when Berlin prosecutors opened an investigation into suspected growing of drugs after an Ice Bucket Challenge video showed him with a cannabis plant in the background. In a subsequent interview with Westdeutsche Allgemeine Zeitung, Özdemir stated that "in a free society it should be up to each individual person to decide whether they want to consume cannabis and take the associated risks."

=== The United Nations ===
Özdemir is a supporter of the Campaign for the Establishment of a United Nations Parliamentary Assembly, an organisation which campaigns for democratic reformation of the United Nations. He believes it is necessary "to give voice to every citizen, woman and man, all over the world; to create legitimacy by true representation, and to enhance political responsibility of the states' leaders."

=== Speed limit ===
Özdemir is in favour of a general speed limit on German Autobahns. According to him, "The introduction of a maximum speed on motorways in Germany would have only advantages: fewer traffic fatalities, immediate climate protection and practically no costs". Furthermore, he stated that "A speed limit would be a requirement of common sense for an enlightened society in the 21st century". He compared the debate of speed limits in Germany with that of the right to bear arms in the United States.

== Other activities ==
=== Corporate boards ===
- Landwirtschaftliche Rentenbank, Deputy Chair of the supervisory board (since 2021)
- KfW, Ex-Officio Member of the Board of Supervisory Directors (since 2021)
- Deutsche Telekom, Yes, I can! Initiative for Children and Young People, Member of the Board of Trustees

=== Non-profit organizations ===
- Peace of Westphalia Prize, Member of the Jury (since 2022)
- German Foundation for Active Citizenship and Volunteering (DSEE), Member of the Board of Trustees (since 2022)
- Deutsche Nationalstiftung, Member of the Senate
- Berlin office of the American Jewish Committee (AJC), Member of the Advisory Board
- Das Progressive Zentrum, Member of the Circle of Friends
- European Council on Foreign Relations (ECFR), Founding Member
- German Association for Small and Medium-Sized Businesses (BVMW), Member of the Political Advisory Board
- German-Turkish Forum of Stuttgart, Member of the Board of Trustees
- Heinrich Böll Foundation, Member of the Europe/Transatlantic Advisory Board
- Stiftung neue verantwortung, Member of the Presidium
- Theodor Heuss Foundation, Member of the Board of Trustees
- Amadeu Antonio Foundation, Founding Member
- Berlin Center for Torture Victims, Member of the advisory board (1998–2002)
- ZDF, Member of the Television Board (2009–2013)

== Recognition ==
- 2018 – Ramer Award for Courage in the Defense of Democracy
- 2011 – Foreign Policy List of Top Global Thinkers
- 2009 – Honorary doctorate of the Tunceli University
- 1996 – Theodor Heuss Medal

== Bibliography ==
- Currywurst und Döner – Integration in Deutschland ISBN 3-7857-0946-3
- Ich bin Inländer (autobiography) ISBN 3-423-36150-6
- Die Türkei: Politik, Religion, Kultur ISBN 3-407-75343-8
