= Simone Peter =

German politician (born 1965)

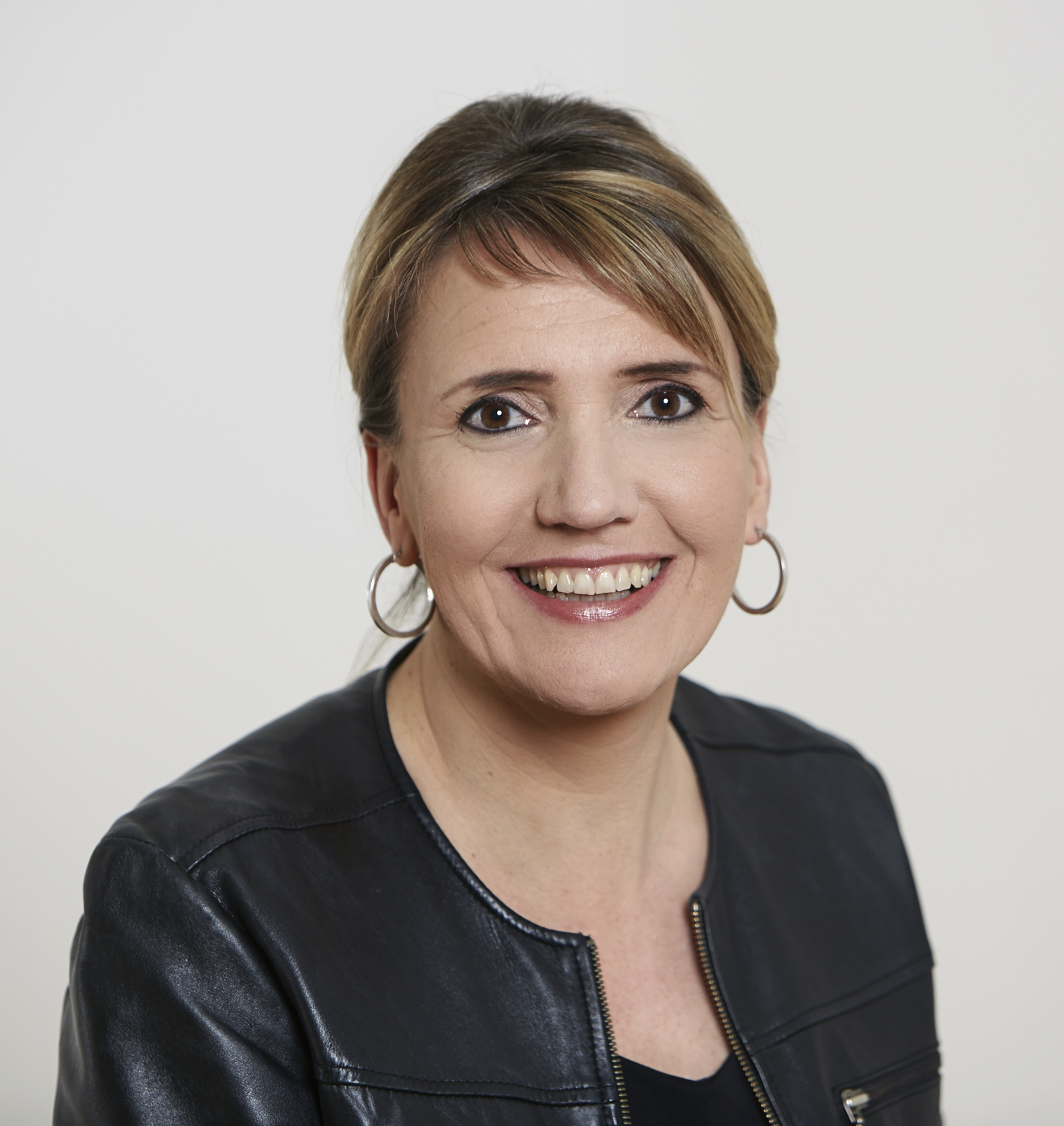

Leader of Alliance 90/The Greens
- In office October 2013 – January 2018 Serving with Cem Özdemir
- Preceded by: Claudia Roth
- Succeeded by: Annalena Baerbock

Member of the Saarland State parliament
- In office March 2012 – November 2013

Personal details
- Born: 3 December 1965 (age 60) Quierschied, West Germany
- Party: Alliance '90/The Greens
- Spouse: Andreas Heiser
- Children: 1
- Education: University of Saarland
- Occupation: Politician

Simone Peter (born 3 December 1965) is a German Alliance 90/The Greens politician. Between 2013 and 2018, she co-chaired the party along with Cem Özdemir.

== Political career ==
Between 2009 and 2012, she was Saarland's State Minister for the Environment, Energy and Transport in the cabinet of former Minister-President Peter Müller (CDU).

Peter served as a Green Party delegate to the Federal Convention for the purpose of electing the President of Germany in 2017. In the unsuccessful negotiations to form a coalition government with the Christian Democrats – both the Christian Democratic Union (CDU) and the Christian Social Union in Bavaria (CSU) – and the Free Democratic Party (FDP) following the 2017 national elections, Peter was part of the 14-member delegation of the Green Party.

== Life after politics ==
Since February 2018, Peter has been serving as chairwoman of the German Renewable Energy Federation (BEE).

== Other activities ==
- ZDF, Member of the Television Board
- Arte, Member of the Programme Advisory Board
- German Federation for the Environment and Nature Conservation (BUND)
- Nature and Biodiversity Conservation Union (NABU), Member
- German United Services Trade Union (ver.di), Member

== Personal life ==
Peter is the daughter of SPD politician Brunhilde Peter, who served as State minister and vice Minister-President under Oskar Lafontaine. Raised in Dillingen, Peter studied microbiology at Universität des Saarlandes in Saarbrücken and received a PhD.

After being editor-in-chief of Eurosolar, she was founding director of a state-supported communications agency promoting Renewable energies. Today, she is married and mother of one child and lives in Saarbrücken.
