= Ernst Ulrich von Weizsäcker =

German politician (born 1939)

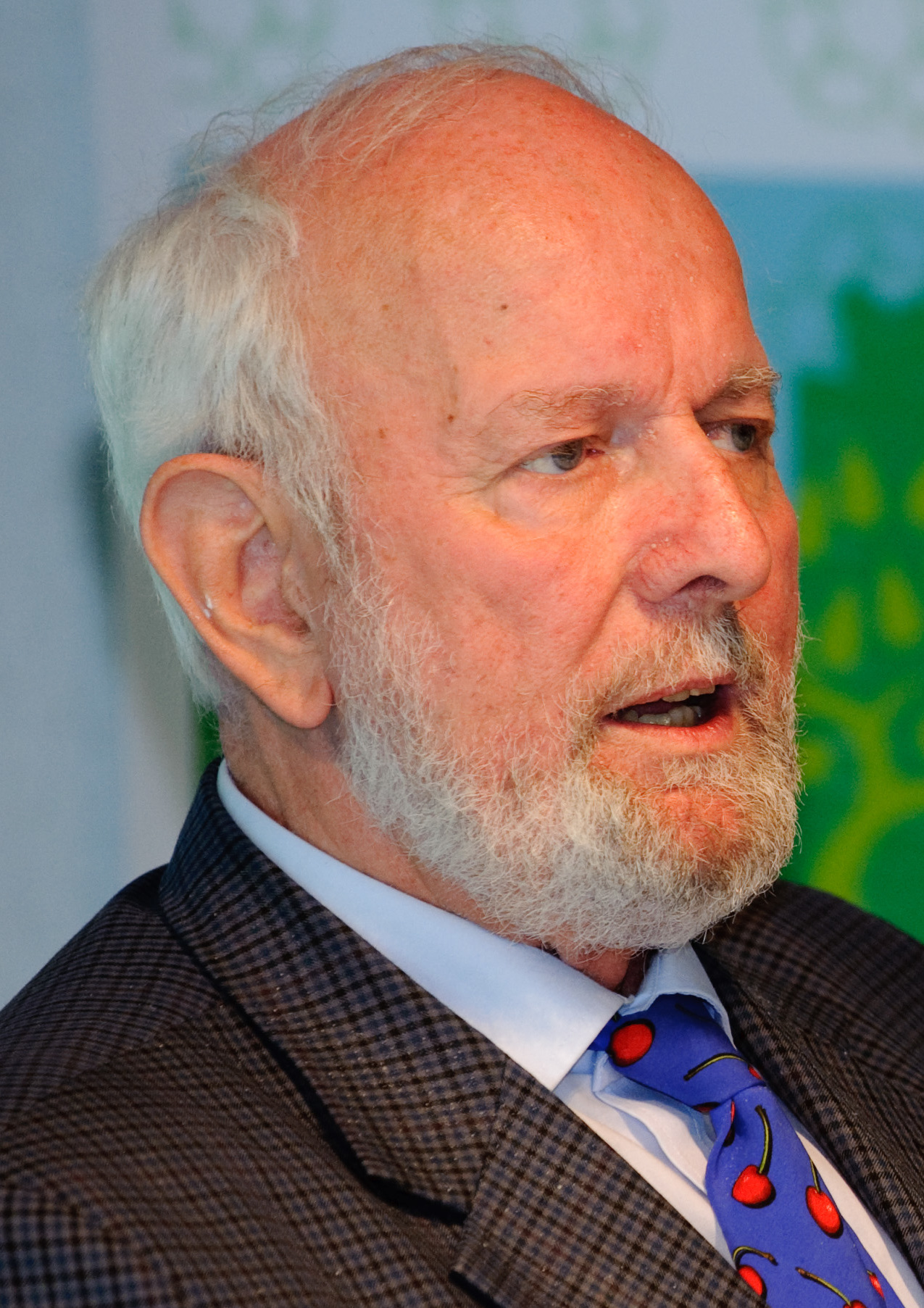
- Weizsäcker in 2010

Member of the Bundestag; from Baden-Württemberg
- In office 26 October 1998 – 18 October 2005
- Preceded by: Multi-member district
- Succeeded by: Johann-Henrich Krummacher
- Constituency: State list (1998–2002); Stuttgart I (2002–2005)

Personal details
- Born: 25 June 1939 (age 87) Zürich, Switzerland
- Party: Social Democratic
- Spouse: Christine Radtke (m. 1969)
- Children: 5, including Jakob
- Parent: Carl Friedrich von Weizsäcker (father)
- Relatives: Weizsäcker family
- Education: University of Hamburg; University of Freiburg
- Occupation: Co-President of the Club of Rome (2011–2019)

Ernst Ulrich von Weizsäcker (born 25 June 1939) is a German scientist and politician of the SPD. He was a member of the German Bundestag and served as co-president of the Club of Rome jointly with Anders Wijkman from 2011 to 2019.

== Early life and education ==
Born in Zürich, Switzerland, Weizsäcker spent his childhood in Zürich and Göttingen. In 1966, he graduated from Hamburg University with a Diplom in physics. In 1968, he obtained his PhD in biology from Freiburg University.

== Career ==
In 1972, he was appointed full professor of biology at Essen University. In 1975, he was recruited as president of the then newly-founded University of Kassel. In 1981, he joined the United Nations in New York as director at the UN Center for Science and Technology. From 1984 to 1991 he headed the Institute for European Environmental Policy in Bonn. In 1991, Weizsäcker became founding president of the Wuppertal Institute, soon establishing itself as a leading environmental think tank.

In 1998, he was elected a member of the German Bundestag for the Social Democratic Party (SPD) and was re-elected in 2002. As a legislator, he chaired the select committee on globalization (2000–2002) and the environment committee (2002–2005). After his decision not to run in the 2005 election, he became Dean of the Bren School of Environmental Science & Management at the University of California, Santa Barbara. He returned to Germany in 2009 where is his an honorary professor at Freiburg University.

A bestselling author in Germany, his English language books include Earth Politics (1994), Factor Four: Doubling Wealth, Halving Resource Use (1995), Factor 5 (2009) and Limits to Privatization (2005).

== Other activities ==
- Commerzbank, Member of the Sustainability Advisory Board (since 2022)

== Personal life and family ==
A member of the prominent Weizsäcker family, he is the son of physicist and philosopher Carl Friedrich von Weizsäcker and nephew of former German president Richard von Weizsäcker. Since 1969, he has been married to Christine von Weizsäcker. Together, they have five children, including MEP Jakob von Weizsäcker.

== Awards and honours ==
- 2000 – Honorary doctorate of Sōka University
- 2001 – Takeda Award
- 2008 – German Environmental Prize
- 2009 – Commander's Cross of the Order of Merit of the Federal Republic of Germany
- 2011 – Theodor Heuss Prize
- 2012 – Order of Merit of Baden-Württemberg
- Honorary Councillor of the World Future Council
