= Johann-Henrich Krummacher =

German politician

Member of the Bundestag; for Stuttgart I
- In office 18 October 2005 – 25 February 2008
- Preceded by: Ernst Ulrich von Weizsäcker
- Succeeded by: Stefan Kaufmann

Personal details
- Born: Johann-Henrich Karl Daniel Krummacher; 27 December 1947 Heidelberg, Germany
- Died: 25 February 2008 (aged 60)
- Party: Christian Democratic Union
- Other political affiliations: SPD (before 2001)
- Children: 6
- Education: Heidelberg University; University of Tübingen

Johann-Henrich Karl Daniel "Jo" Krummacher (27 December 1947 – 25 February 2008) was a German politician from the Christian Democratic Union.

== Early life ==
He was born in Heidelberg. He was a Protestant clergyman.

== Politics ==
In the 2005 German federal election, he was elected Member of the German Bundestag for the Stuttgart I constituency.

== See also ==
- List of members of the 16th Bundestag
