= Stefan Kaufmann (politician) =

German politician (born 1969)

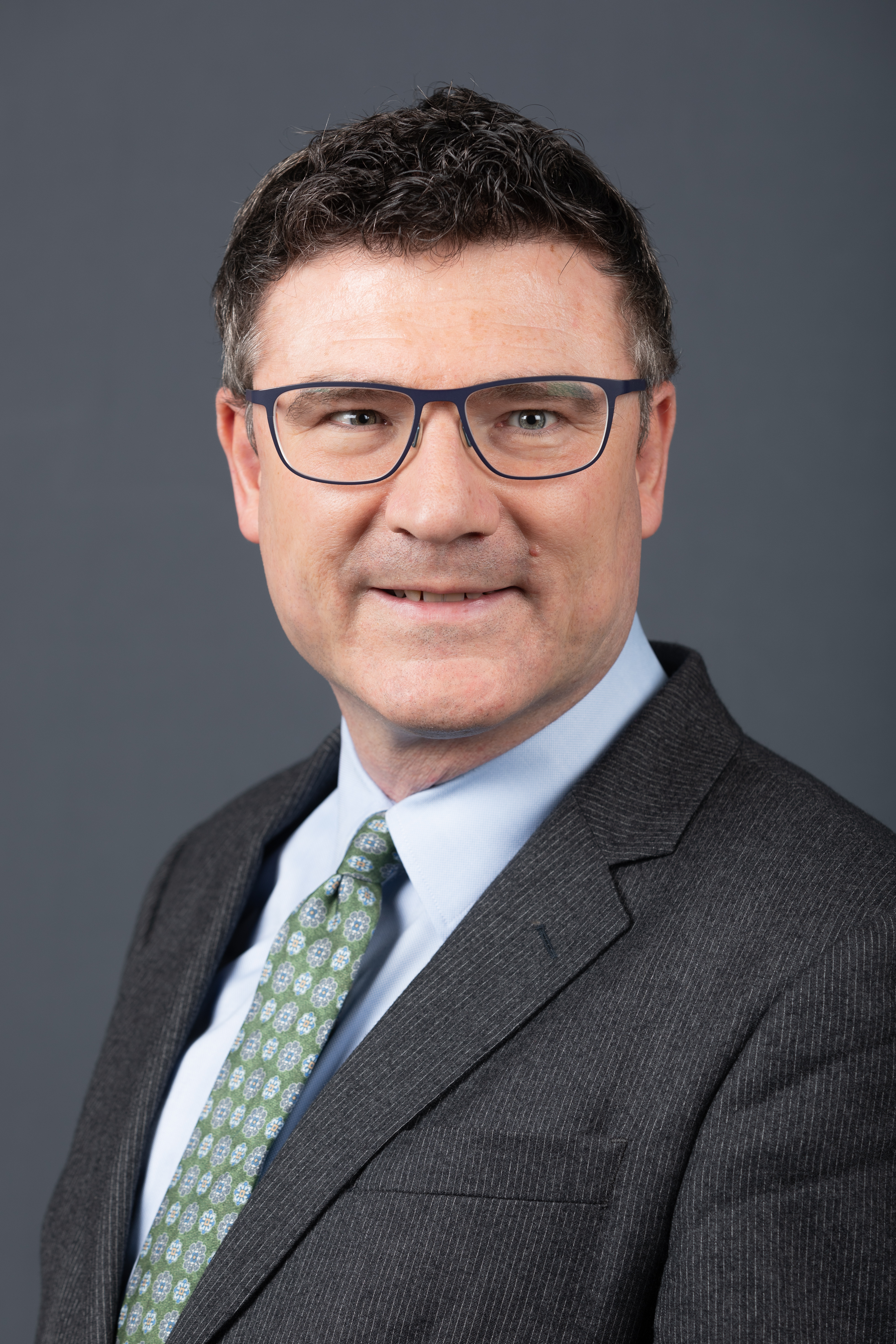
- Kaufmann in 2020

Member of the Bundestag
- In office 4 January 2024 – 25 March 2025
- Preceded by: Wolfgang Schäuble
- Succeeded by: Johannes Rothenberger
- Constituency: Offenburg
- In office 27 October 2009 – 26 October 2021
- Preceded by: Johann-Henrich Krummacher
- Succeeded by: Cem Özdemir
- Constituency: Stuttgart I

Personal details
- Born: 21 August 1969 (age 56) Stuttgart, West Germany
- Party: Christian Democratic Union

Stefan Kaufmann (born 21 August 1969 in Stuttgart) is a German politician of the Christian Democratic Union (CDU) who has served as a member of the German Bundestag from 2009 to 2021 and again from 2024 to March 2025.

== Early life ==
Kaufmann was born as the youngest of three brothers to a family living in Stuttgart-Weilimdorf. His father, a confidential clerk, died in 1982. He received his Abitur in 1989 at the Solitude-Gymnasium and served during his Zivildienst at the Diakonisches Werk Württemberg. He attended university in Tübingen, majoring in Legal science, including a year at Leiden University. Afterwards, he worked as a scientific assistant at the University of Hohenheim. Kaufmann had a Konrad Adenauer Foundation scholarship since before he graduated from university and became a Doctor of law in 2001. He is a member of Phi Delta Phi.

== Early career ==
In 1992, Kaufmann founded the "Forum für Hochschul- und Bildungspolitik Tübingen e.V" (Forum for Hochschul- and Education Politics Tübingen e.V) in Tübingen. This association's task was developing a general concept for educational politics that particularly targeted the contact points between the respective institutions. For his work in relation to this, he received an award from the Ministry of Science, Research and Arts of Baden-Württemberg.

From 1995 until 1998, Kaufmann was assistant to Doris Pack, CDU, then Speaker in Matters of Educational Politics for the EPP at the European Parliament. Later, he was assistant and speechwriter for MEP Renate Heinisch, also CDU.

== Political career ==
Kaufmann joined the CDU in 1999. Between March 2001 and October 2009, he was a Speaker for the Party in the district advisory council of Stuttgart-Sillenbuch, since April 2003 he has been chairman of the local group of the CDU in "Stuttgart-Sillenbuch-Heumaden-Riedenberg".

In November 2005 he was elected secondary candidate for the Landtag in the Stuttgart I electoral district, and one year later he was elected member of the District Board of the CDU.

In 2008, the CDU in Stuttgart appointed him candidate for the Bundestag, again in Stuttgart I, after his predecessor on this appointment had died. In October of the same year he was elected Deputy District Chairman of the CDU in Stuttgart.

=== Member of the Bundestag ===
In the 2009 German federal election, Kaufmann won the direct mandate in Stuttgart I over the Federal Chairman of the Bündnis 90/Die Grünen, Cem Özdemir, and hence became MdB (Member of the Bundestag). In his campaign, he also campaigned in local hotspots of the homosexual scene and on Christopher Street Day. At the same time being a devoted catholic, he also criticized the comparison with Nazism the Society of St. Pius X published on the occasion of the Christopher Street Day in 2007.

In parliament, Kaufmann was a member of the Committee of Education, Research and Technological Impact Assessment. He also served as deputy member of the Budget Committee, after previously having been a deputy member of the Committee on Petitions and the Committee of Traffic, Construction and Urban Development.

In the negotiations to form a fourth coalition government under Chancellor Angela Merkel following the 2017 federal elections, Kaufmann was part of the working group on education policy, led by Annegret Kramp-Karrenbauer, Stefan Müller and Hubertus Heil.

In January 2024, Kaufmann re-entered the German Parliament when he took the seat of deceased Wolfgang Schäuble. In parliament, he has since been serving on the Committee on European Affairs and the Parliamentary Advisory Board on Sustainable Development.

== Other activities ==
- Helmholtz Association of German Research Centres, Ex-Officio Member of the Senate
- Leibniz Association, Member of the Senate (since 2018)
- German National Association for Student Affairs, Ex-Officio Member of the Board of Trustees
- Magnus Hirschfeld Foundation, Member of the Board of Trustees
- Max Planck Institute for Solid State Research, Member of the Board of Trustees
- Jugend gegen AIDS, Member of the Advisory Board
- Phi Delta Phi – Richard von Weizsäcker Inn Tübingen, Honorary Member

== Political positions ==
In 2019, Kaufmann joined 14 members of his parliamentary group who, in an open letter, called for the party to rally around Merkel and party chairwoman Annegret Kramp-Karrenbauer amid criticism voiced by conservatives Friedrich Merz and Roland Koch.

== Personal life ==
Kaufmann is openly gay.

In June 2010, Kaufmann was involved in a planecrash when a historical DC-3 he was riding in crashlanded shortly after take-off.

== Publication ==
Das Europäische Hochschulinstitut: Die Florentiner Europa-Universität im Gefüge des europäischen und internationalen Rechts, (Tübinger Schriften zum internationalen und europäischen Recht 61; Berlin : Duncker & Humblot, 2003), ISBN 3-428-10753-5
