= Dohring =

Dohring is a surname. Notable people with the surname include:

- Alfred Dohring (1896–1982), Australian politician
- Doug Dohring (1957–2023), American businessman
- Jason Dohring (born 1982), American actor
- Tom Dohring (born 1968), American football player

== See also ==
- Döhring, another surname
