= Judith Skudelny =

German politician (born 1975)

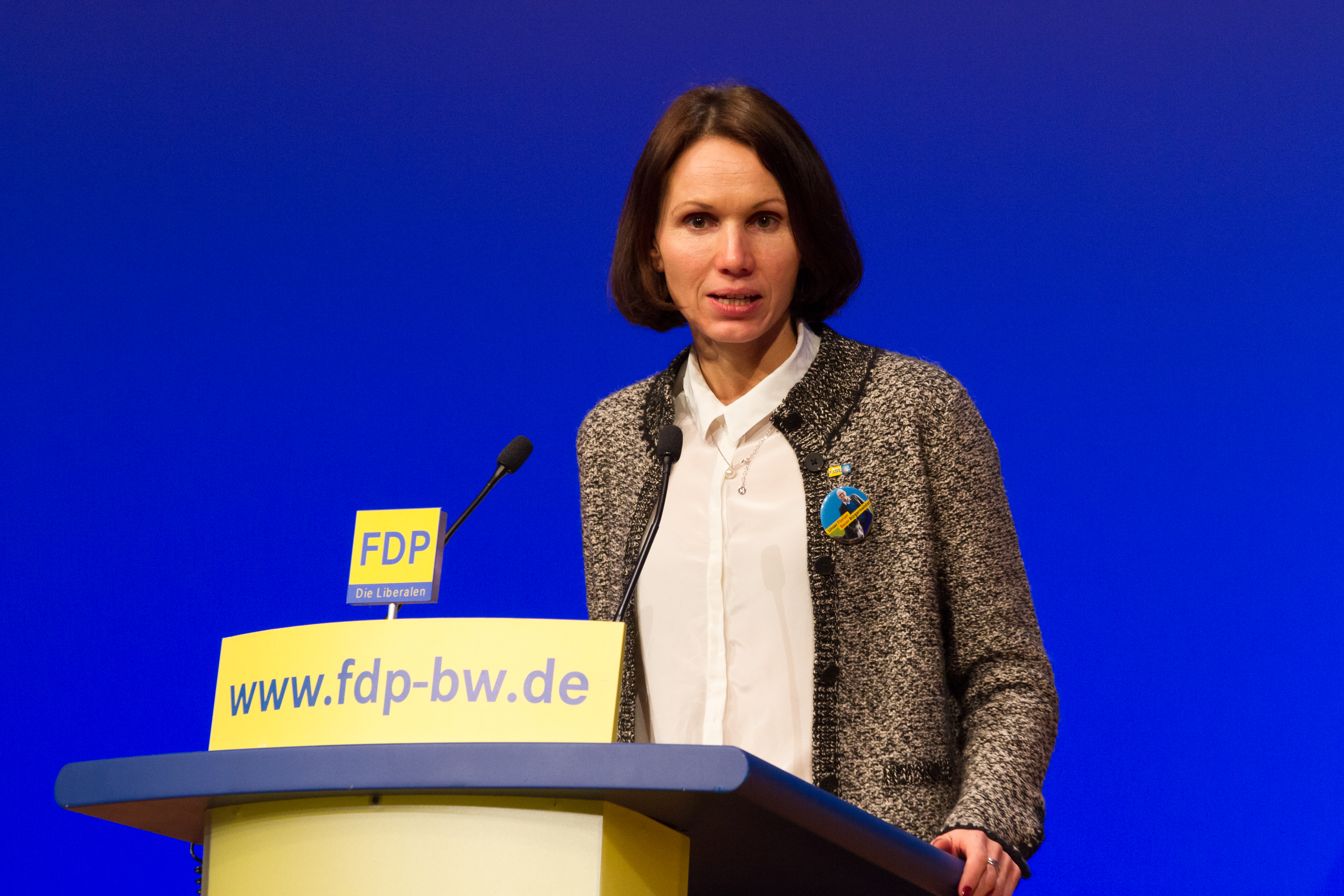
- Judith Skudelny in 2015

Member of the Bundestag
- In office 2017–2025

Personal details
- Born: 2 October 1975 (age 51) Stuttgart, West Germany (now Germany)
- Party: FDP
- Children: 2
- Education: University of Tübingen

Judith Skudelny (born 2 October 1975) is a German lawyer and politician of the Free Democratic Party (FDP) who served as a member of the Bundestag from the state of Baden-Württemberg from 2009 to 2013 and again from 2017 to 2025.

== Early life and career ==
After graduating from high school in Stuttgart-Möhringen in 1995, Skudelny studied law at the University of Tübingen, which she completed with the first state examination in 1999. Afterwards, she spent a year as a personal advisor to Ulrich Noll, a member of the State Parliament of Baden-Württemberg. After her second state examination, she was admitted to the bar in 2003 and has since been working as a lawyer specialising in reorganisation and insolvency law.

== Political career ==
From 2009 until 2013, Skudelny served as a member of the Bundestag for the first time. During that time, she was a member of the Committee on the Environment, Nature Conservation and Nuclear Safety.

Skudelny became a member of the Bundestag again after the 2017 German federal election. She was a member of the Committee on the Environment, Nature Conservation and Nuclear Safety again. She served as her parliamentary group's spokesperson on environmental policy.

In addition, Skudelny was a substitute member of the Committee on Legal Affairs and Consumer Protection and the Committee on the Election of Judges (Wahlausschuss), which is in charge of appointing judges to the Federal Constitutional Court of Germany.

Following the 2021 state elections in Baden-Württemberg, Skudelny was part of her party's delegation in the negotiations with Minister-President Winfried Kretschmann's Alliance '90/Greens on a potential coalition government.

In the negotiations to form a so-called traffic light coalition of the Social Democratic Party (SPD), the Green Party and the FDP following the 2021 German elections, Skudelny was part of her party's delegation in the working group on environmental policy, co-chaired by Rita Schwarzelühr-Sutter, Steffi Lemke and Stefan Birkner.

== Other activities ==
- Amnesty International, Member
