= Birkach =

- Borough of Stuttgart
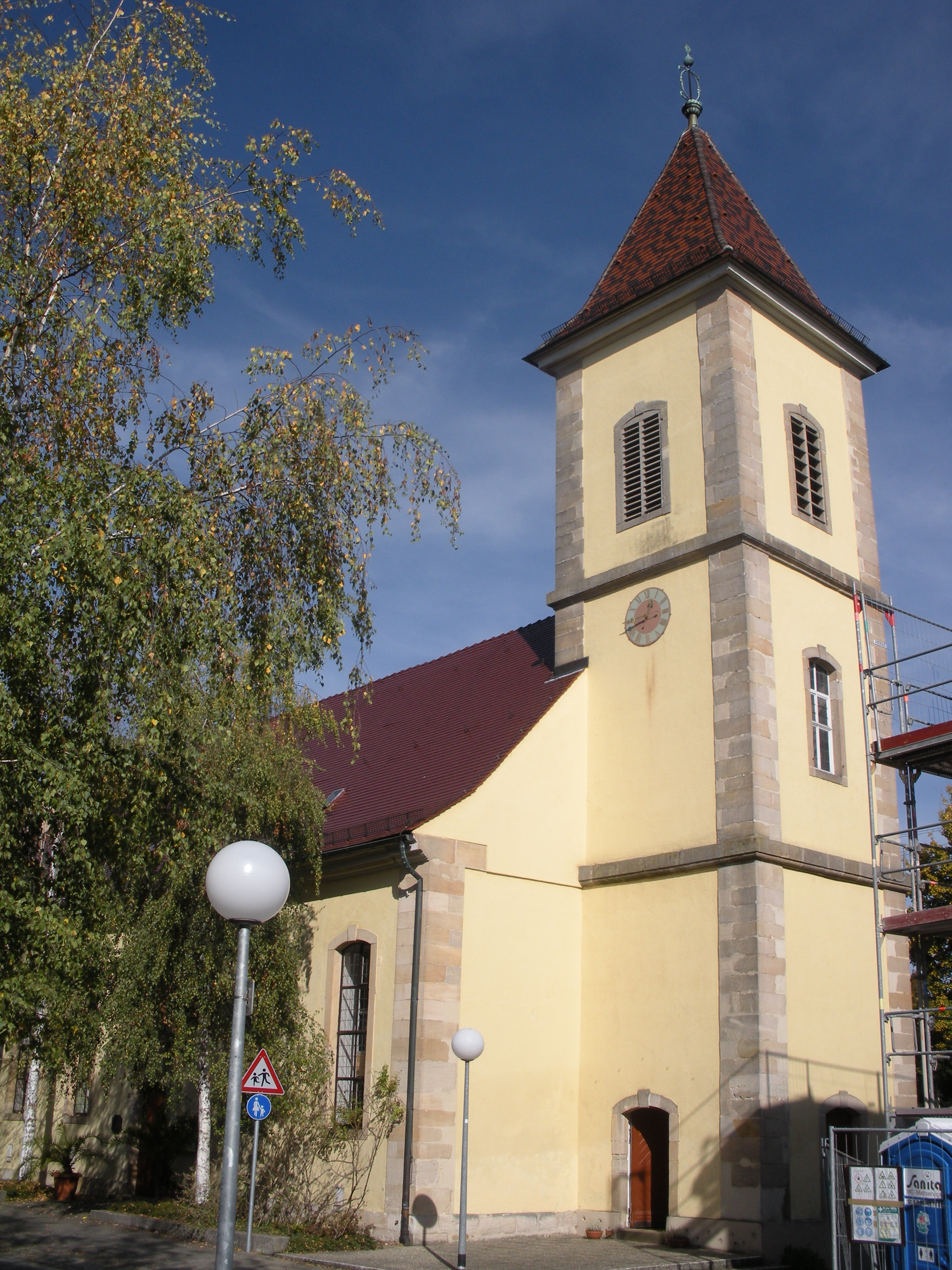
- Evangelical Church of Birkach

- Coat of arms

- Location in Stuttgart
- Interactive map of Birkach
- Location within Germany Location within Baden-Württemberg
- Coordinates: 48°43′10″N 9°12′29″E
- Country: Germany
- State: Baden-Württemberg
- Admin. region: Stuttgart
- City: Stuttgart
- Subdivisions: Birkach-North, Birkach-South, Schönberg

Government
  - Mayor: Andrea Lindel

Area
  - Total: 3.00 km^{2} (1.16 sq mi)
- Elevation: 387 m (1,270 ft)

Population (2020-12-31)
  - Total: 7,146
  - Density: 2,380/km^{2} (6,170/sq mi)
- Time zone: UTC+01:00 (CET)
  - Summer (DST): UTC+02:00 (CEST)
- Postal codes: 70599
- Dialling codes: 0711
- Vehicle registration: S
- Website: stuttgart.de

Birkach (German pronunciation: [ˈbɪʁkax]) is a borough in the south of Stuttgart located on the plain known as the Filderebene, just north of Plieningen. Of the districts of Stuttgart, Birkach is among the smallest.

== History ==
Birkach was mentioned for the first time in 1140 as "Birckhe" and was probably a possession of the Lords of Plieingen and by extension the County Palatine of Tübingen. Between 1295 and 1317, the village, now known as Birtach or Birka, was sold to Bebenhausen Abbey.
