= Clara Döhring =

German politician (1899–1987)

Member of the Bundestag; from Baden-Württemberg
- In office 7 September 1949 – 17 October 1965
- Preceded by: Constituency established
- Succeeded by: Erwin Schoettle
- Constituency: Stuttgart I (1949–1953); State list (1953–1961); Stuttgart I (1961–1965)

Personal details
- Born: 13 March 1899 Saalfeld, Thuringia, Germany
- Died: 7 June 1987 (aged 88)
- Party: Social Democratic

Clara Döhring (13 March 1899 – 7 June 1987) was a German politician of the Social Democratic Party (SPD) and former member of the German Bundestag.

== Life ==
Clara Döhring had been a member of the SPD since 1917. After the Second World War, she was involved in rebuilding social democracy in Wuerttemberg. Döhring was a member of the German Bundestag from 1949 to 1965. She was elected in the first legislative period in the constituency of Stuttgart I and later via the state list in Baden-Württemberg.

== Literature ==
Herbst, Ludolf; Jahn, Bruno (2002). Vierhaus, Rudolf (ed.). Biographisches Handbuch der Mitglieder des Deutschen Bundestages. 1949–2002 [Biographical Handbook of the Members of the German Bundestag. 1949–2002] (in German). München: De Gruyter - De Gruyter Saur. p. 1715. ISBN 978-3-11-184511-1.
