= Stuttgart-Center =

Stuttgart-Center Stuttgart-Mitte
- Borough of Stuttgart
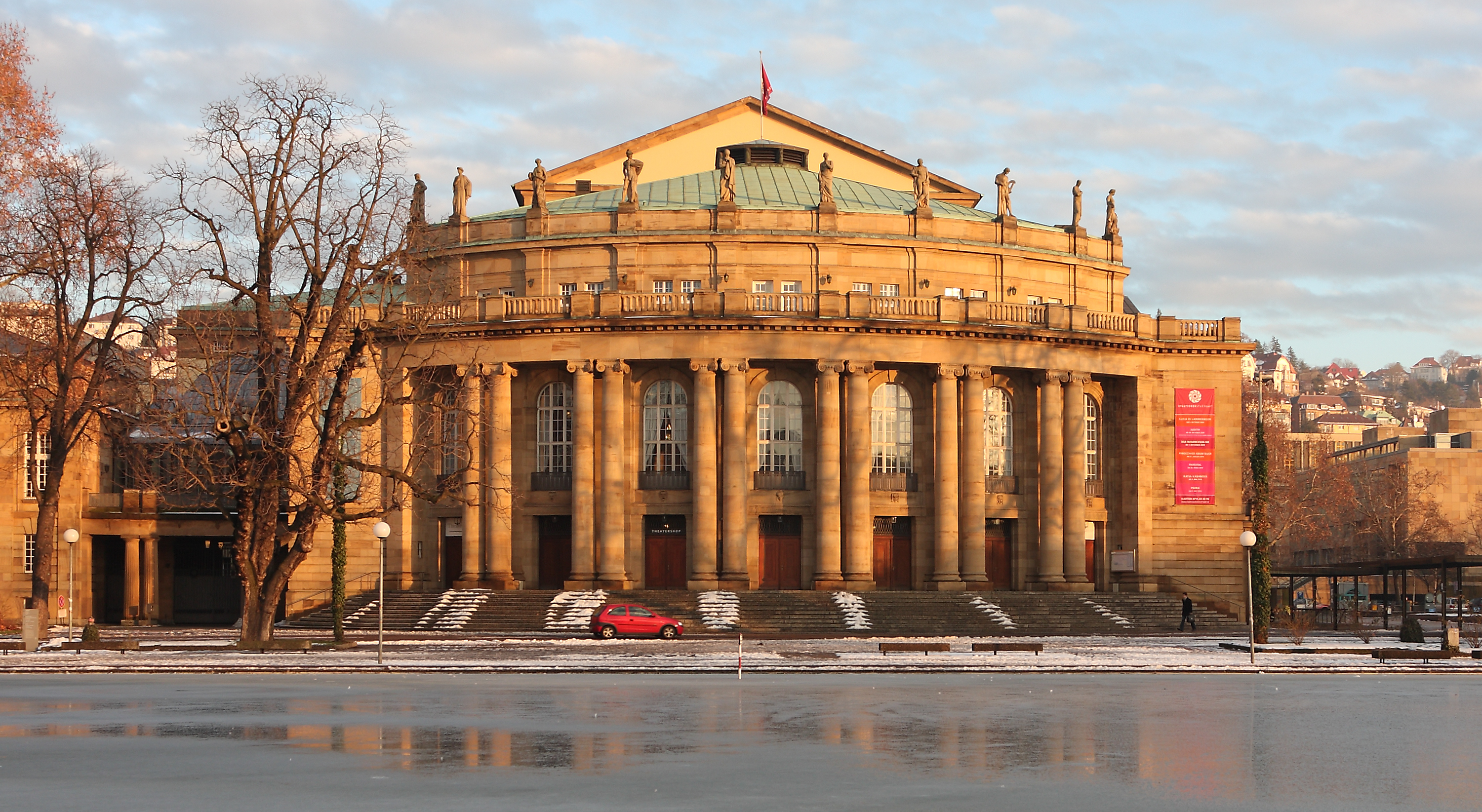
- Staatsoper Stuttgart

- Coat of arms

- Location within Stuttgart
- Interactive map of Stuttgart-Center
- Location within Germany Location within Baden-Württemberg
- Coordinates: 48°46′36″N 9°10′39″E
- Country: Germany
- State: Baden-Württemberg
- Admin. region: Stuttgart
- District: Urban area
- City: Stuttgart

Area
  - Total: 3.806 km^{2} (1.470 sq mi)
- Elevation: 245 m (804 ft)

Population (2020-12-31)
  - Total: 23,625
  - Density: 6,207/km^{2} (16,080/sq mi)
- Time zone: UTC+01:00 (CET)
  - Summer (DST): UTC+02:00 (CEST)
- Dialling codes: 0711
- Vehicle registration: S
- Website: www.stuttgart.de

Stuttgart-Center (German: Stuttgart-Mitte, pronounced [ˈʃtʊtɡaʁt ˈmɪtə]) is one of the five inner boroughs of the Germany city of Stuttgart. It is located at the very center, between Stuttgart-North, West, East and South, of the city on the banks of the Neckar about an hour from the Black Forest.

== Geography ==
Stuttgart-Center is located lies an hour from the Black Forest and a similar distance from the Swabian Jura mountains. Stuttgart lies inside a fertile valley known as the Stuttgarter Kessel (Stuttgart cauldron) whose boundaries are politically the four other districts (North, West, East, and South) bordering it, and physically the woodlands around it. The Neckar flows through the center of the valley. A few of the district's notable landmarks are the Old Castle (Stuttgart) and the Staatsoper Stuttgart.

== History ==
Duke Liudolf of Swabia is believed to have founded Stuttgart in 950 AD during the Hungarian invasions of Europe, just before the Battle of Lechfeld, around a stud farm. This particular location was picked because of the three hills around the basin, making it ideal for horse breeding.

New archeological excavations at the Collegiate Church and Old Castle have revealed tombs dating back to the late Merovingian period.

== Landmarks, sights, and culture ==
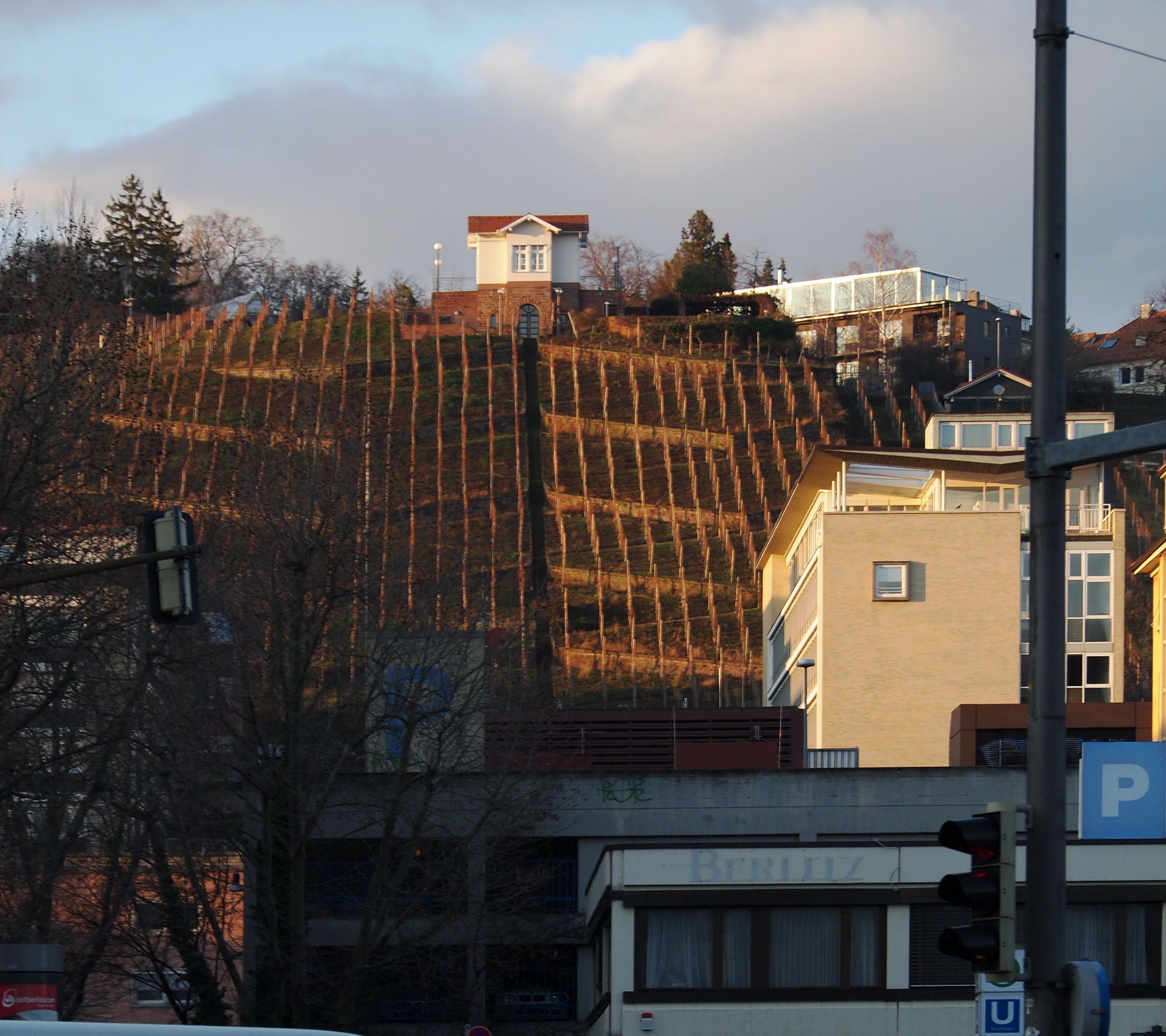
A vineyard in the city centre

=== Museums ===
Museums in Stuttgart-Center include the Old State Gallery (opened in 1843, extended in 1984) which holds art dating from the 14th to 19th century including works by Rubens, Rembrandt, Monet, Renoir, Cézanne and Beuys. Next door to the Old State Gallery is the New State Gallery (1980) with its controversial modern architecture. Among others, this gallery houses works from Max Beckmann, Dalí, Matisse, Miró, Picasso, Klee, Chagall and Kandinsky.
