= Stuttgart-North =

Stuttgart-North Stuttgart-Nord
- Borough of Stuttgart
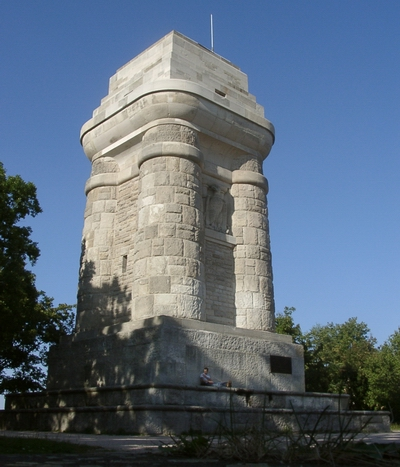
- Bismarckturm

- Coat of arms

- Location within Stuttgart
- Interactive map of Stuttgart-North
- Location within Germany Location within Baden-Württemberg
- Coordinates: 48°47′50″N 9°10′37″E
- Country: Germany
- State: Baden-Württemberg
- Admin. region: Stuttgart
- District: Stuttgart
- City: Stuttgart
- Founded: 10th Century

Government
  - Mayor: Sabine Mezger

Area
  - Total: 6.815 km^{2} (2.631 sq mi)
- Elevation: 210–409 m (689–1,342 ft)

Population (2020-12-31)
  - Total: 27,275
  - Density: 4,002/km^{2} (10,370/sq mi)
- Time zone: UTC+01:00 (CET)
  - Summer (DST): UTC+02:00 (CEST)
- Postal codes: 70174, 70191, 70192
- Dialling codes: 0711
- Vehicle registration: S
- Website: www.stuttgart.de

Stuttgart-Nord (German: Stuttgart-Nord, pronounced [ˈʃtʊtɡaʁt ˈnɔʁt]) is an inner city borough in the north of Stuttgart.

== Geography ==
Stuttgart-Nord extends from the Doggenburg to the highest point, the Gähkopf (409 m above sea level) to the Bismarckturm, on the Killesberg and the Pragsattel to Rosenstein Park and the Pragfriedhof. The Pragsattel located at the lowest point of a ridge from Killesberg to Burgholzhof.

One finds in Stuttgart-Nord numerous good residential areas and viewpoints on the Stuttgart city center. Noteworthy streets are: Am Bismarckturm, Am Gähkopf, Caesar Flaischlen Street, Eduard-Pfeiffer-Straße, Feuerbacher Heide, Lenzhalde, Robert-Bosch-Straße and Schottstraße.

== History ==
Stuttgart-North was created when Stuttgart was divided into districts in 1956. The western boundary of this new district extended from the Doggenburg to Weißenhof and Killesberg. When the districts were reorganised on 1 January 2001, Stuttgart-North was split into 11 subdistricts.
