= Quarteera =

LGBTQ association

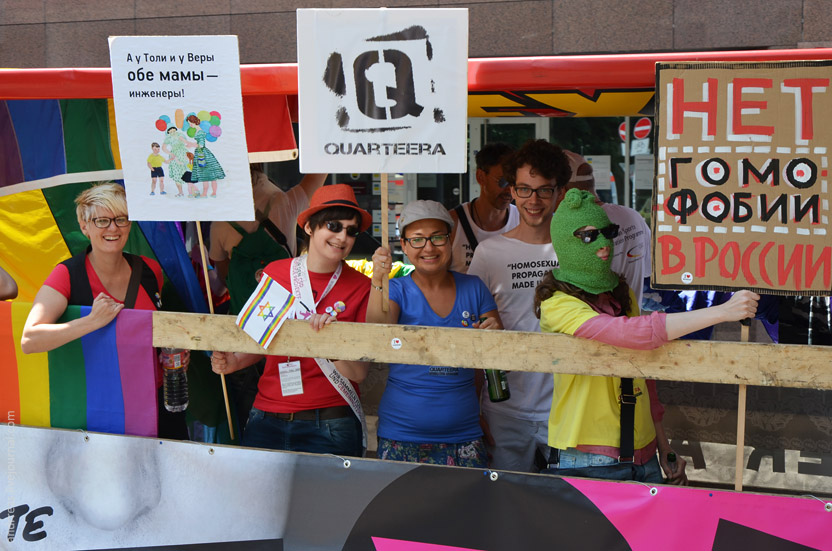
Quarteera at the Christopher Street Day parade in Berlin, 2012

Quarteera is a Russian-speaking non-profit volunteer LGBTQ registered association in Berlin, Germany. The association was officially registered in April 2011 and calls itself the "Russian-speaking group of gay, lesbian, bisexual, transgender people and their friends in Germany". The name plays on the words queer, art, and quarter.

The association was first founded in 2009, when several activists organized the so-called "Rainbow Flashmob" on May 17 where, in honor of the International Day Against Homophobia, Biphobia and Transphobia, thousands of colorful balloons were released into the sky.

In 2026, Quarteera was designated as an undesirable organization in Russia.

== Activities ==
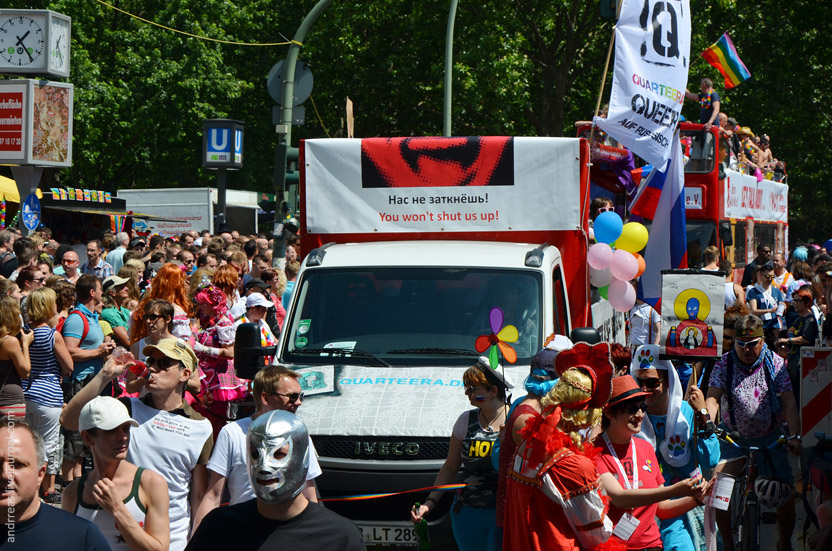
Quarteera and the Russian speaking LGBTQ community in Germany are protesting at the CSD in Berlin against anti-gay laws in Russia, 2012

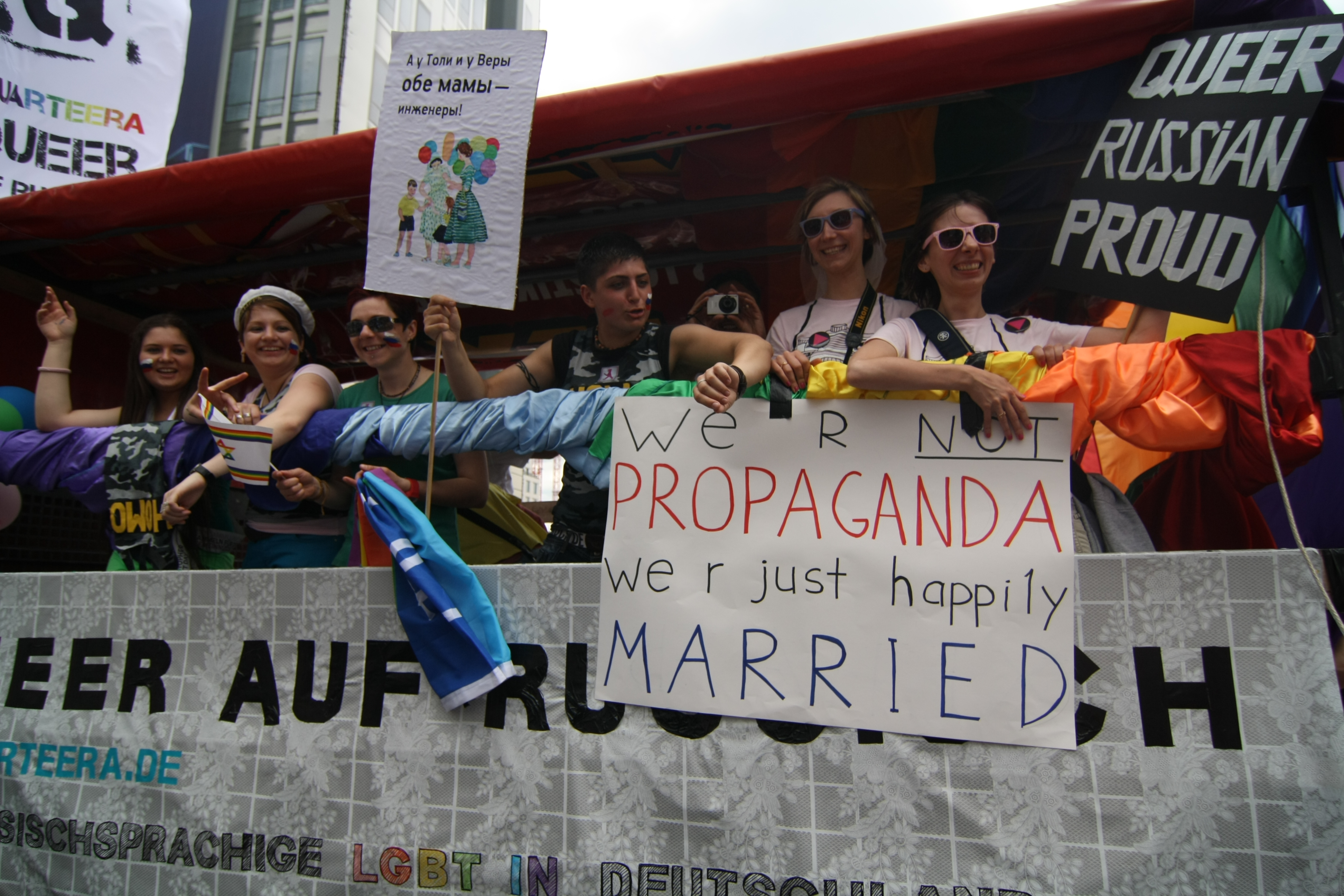
Quarteera's truck CSD in Berlin 2012

=== Educational activities ===
One of the goals of the association is to work with Russian LGBTQ migrants, helping them with their Coming Out to their parents and families who are often thought to be more homophobic than the rest of German society. Future plans of the association include creating of a professional consulting service, including professional psychological and legal support.

From 18th to 28 December 2011, in co-operation with the St. Petersburg's association "Exit", the Russian LGBT Network and the "Gender-L" association in Saxon Switzerland, Quarteera organized and led an educational workshop on the topic of homosexuality and tolerance at a winter camp for Russian youth.

In December 2012 Quarteera, having received funding from the Hirschfeld Eddy Foundation, published a brochure in German about the situation of the human rights of LGBTQ people in Russia and the countries of the former Soviet Union. In cooperation with the Quarteera Berlin Museum of Homosexuality prepared an exhibition in the summer of 2013, which was devoted to the situation of homosexuals in the Soviet Union and Russia.

=== Educational activities and organization of demonstrations ===
Quarteera has repeatedly organized various demonstrations and rallies in support of LGBTQ rights in Russia, together with German LGBTQ organizations. In June 2011, the organization participated in a rally in front of the Russian Embassy in Berlin. The rally was also attended by activists of the Union of Gays and Lesbians in Germany, as well as the Bundestag deputy from the Green Party Volker Beck.

In February 2012, Quarteera once again was one of the organizers of the protests in front of the Russian Embassy in Berlin against a ban on the promotion of homosexuality in St. Petersburg. The protest was supported by activists from the Russian "Rainbow Association", the International Film Festival "Side by Side", the International Hirschfeld Eddy Foundation and the Union of Gays and Lesbians in Germany. The rally was also attended by German politicians, such as member of the Bundestag, Marieluise Beck.

On June 23, 2012, at the Christopher Street Day Parade, Russian Quarteera opened the Berlin Pride, which attracted about 700,000 people. Based on the artists' Pierre et Gilles work, posters illustrating Vladimir Putin and Dmitry Medvedev were designed for the Pride. The posters were featured in the majority of Russian media materials about pride. Russian First Channel also interviewed the organizers of Quarteera at Berlin Pride. One of the members of the organization was invited to participate in a talk show.

In November 2013 an activist of Quarteera, Ivan Kilber, broke through to the podium with his hands smeared with red paint and a rainbow flag, saying "Mizulina has the blood of young homosexuals and transgender people who were killed or committed suicide on her hands" during Yelena Mizulina's speech at the conference "For the future of the family" in Leipzig, organized by right-wing magazine Compact.

In January 2014 Quarteera participated as a guest at a parliamentary meeting in the European Parliament at a meeting devoted to discussion of issues related to human rights in Russia. On February 1, 2014, the Red City Hall hosted an international conference in Berlin "Gold For Equal Rights", where one of the co-organizers was Quarteera. The conference was devoted to the situation of LGBTQ people in Russia. It was also attended by many Russian LGBTQ activists.

Every year, the organization holds "Rainbow Flashmobs" in German cities – launching helium balloons into the air on the International Day Against Homophobia, Biphobia and Transphobia. In July 2012 one of the founders of Quarteera, activist Ivan Kilber, was awarded the Hamburg Gay Pride prize for the invention of the "Rainbow Flashmob" in 2009, which was then held in more than 30 Russian cities, and has today turned into an international action.

=== Assistance in obtaining political asylum ===
Among other things, Quarteera wishes to help people obtain refugee status in Germany because of discrimination based on sexual orientation. In particular, Quarteera helps them to find a lawyer and prepare for an interview. In September 2013, with the support of Quarteera 26-year-old gay Pavel from Novosibirsk was granted political asylum in Germany. This was the first case of a homosexual obtaining Russian political asylum in Germany.

According to Quarteera, after the adoption of the law banning promotion of homosexuality requests for assistance in seeking political asylum in Germany are received on a daily basis. As of November 2013 the organization has assisted only two people, 12 more cases were under consideration. However, Quarteera dissuades Russian LGBTQ from seeking asylum in Germany and ask them to consider other emigration options due to the fact that refugee status in Germany is very difficult to obtain.

== See also ==
- Olympic protests of Russian anti-gay laws
- Principle 6 campaign
