= Jacques Teyssier =

German LGBT rights activist (1955–2009)

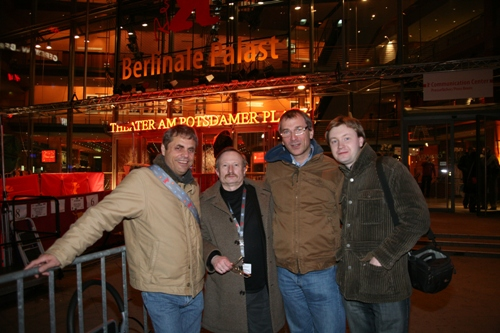
Jacques Teyssier, Vladimir Ivanov, Volker Beck and Nikolai Alekseev in February 2007 in Berlin during the Berlin International Film Festival.

Jacques Teyssier (31 October 1955 – 25 July 2009) was a French and German citizen, and a German LGBT rights activist.

== Life ==
From 1996 to 2008 Teyssier was member of the board of directors of the Lesben- und Schwulenverband in Deutschland, LSVD (lesbian and gay association in Germany). From 1997 to 2005 he was treasurer of the LSVD. In 2009 he was appointed Honorary Chairman of the LSVD in recognition of his life achievements for this organization. He represents his organisation within ILGA and ILGA-Europe. One of his achievements was the recognition of LSVD by the United Nations (ECOPSOC). He was also involved in the building of the Human Rights organisation Hirschfeld Eddy Foundation along with Belissa Andía Pérez.

From 1992 Teyssier lived with his partner Volker Beck, a German politician and one of the most famous gay activists in Germany. They lived in Cologne, Paris and Berlin. In 2008, after 16 years of partnership, they registered their partnership according to the German law. 1977–78 he served in the French army as officer in the secret service of the airforce. He studied at the Grande École de Management et de Commerce: EM Lyon – ESC in Lyon and worked for a German pharmaceutical company. He represented a pharmaceutical company in the Near East and was General Directeur of Madaus France.

Teyssier took part in the Gay rights events in Warsaw, locally known as the "Parada Rowności" (Equality Parade) in 2005 and 2006 and also in Moscow in 2006 and 2007. He represented the LSVD on these events.

Teyssier died of cancer in Berlin in 2009. Speaking from Moscow, Nikolai Alekseev, Moscow Pride Chief Organizer said about the death of Teyssier: “It will be hard for me to return to Berlin without meeting him, seeing his smile and also quarrelling on our activism stories around a glass of wine. Volker and Jacques were always very supportive of our work, not only in words, but also in their actions. I feel terribly sad”. “Jacques and Volker stood together against hatred, and in support of their LGBT brothers and sisters across the world. Jacques’ passion and spirit will be missed by the many friends and colleagues he made along the way,” said Chuck Wolfe, president and CEO of the Gay & Lesbian Victory Fund and Leadership Institute. A commemoration minute was held for him at the Human Rights Conference of the OutGames. The City of West Hollywood adjourned its Meeting on 17 August 2009 to honor the memory of Teyssier.
