= Feminist science and technology studies =

Feminist science and technology studies (feminist STS) is a theoretical subfield of science and technology studies (STS), which explores how gender interacts with science and technology. The field emerged in the early 1980s alongside other relativist theories of STS which rejected the dominance of technological determinism, proposing that reality is multiple rather than fixed and prioritizing situated knowledges over scientific objectivity. Feminist STS's material-semiotic theory evolved to display a complex understanding of gender and technology relationships by the 2000s, notable scholars producing feminist critiques of scientific knowledge and the design and use of technologies. The co-constructive relationship between gender and technology contributed to feminist STS's rejection of binary gender roles by the twenty-first century, the field's framework expanding to incorporate principles of feminist technoscience and queer theory amidst widespread adoption of the internet.

Historical areas of research include policy development, reproduction, pharmaceuticals, design and use of consumer products, and engineering cultures, researchers exploring ways gender creates and is created by individuals or groups interacting with non-human actors. Feminist STS scholars prioritize this relationship of co-construction to emphasize that neither gender nor technology and science exists before their interaction, but instead, reality exists in the social and material interactions, producing these concepts as a result. Establishing this material-semiotic framework involved a decades-long process of internal negotiation between feminist STS researchers, binary gender presentations of past STS research undergoing detailed critique to reframe these understandings to reflect the field's stance on gender not as fixed, but as multiple and flexible.

Key concepts of feminist STS include material-semiotics, situated knowledges, and social constructivism. The discipline has contributed material-semiotic theory to contemporary STS research but has received criticism for the inability to universalize concepts in its research, limiting the field's impact.

== Background and context ==
=== Early 1980s – late 1990s ===
Feminist STS emerged as a social theory in the early 1980s prompted by an introduction of feminist theory into science and technology studies, partially credited to Donna Haraway's 1985 article "A Cyborg Manifesto". The discipline gained prominence in STS alongside Social construction of technology (SCOT) and Actor-network theory (ANT) as a response to criticisms of objectivity and technological determinism. Early feminist STS literature focused on gender differences in technology use, such as Claude S. Fischer's study of the residential telephone and Cynthia Cockburn and Susan Ormrod's study of the microwave oven.

Including Adele Clarke and Theresa Montini's arena analysis of abortifacient technology RU486, early feminist STS researchers used the case study method to show that men and women interact with technology in different ways. These studies were significant for establishing how people come to associate technology with masculinity or femininity through social interaction. In addition to determining masculinity and femininity are multiple rather than binary constructs, research showed evidence of situated knowledges, or, the idea that there is no such thing as a neutral subject or researcher. From establishing a presence in pharmaceutical and commercial technologies, feminist STS expanded into questioning the dominant authority of science by the early 1990s, borrowing methodology from ANT to expand upon prior research. Theory and methods from SCOT were also incorporated into the discipline as researchers began to explore the process through which gender becomes embedded within technology, with studies adopting principles of social constructivism, for example, Judy Wajcman's research on the culture of engineering. Other feminist STS studies throughout the 1990s were also influenced by the work of Steve Woolgar and his research on how technology is designed with users in mind, such as Trevor Pinch and Nancy Oudshoorn, who continued research into user configuration into the 2000s.

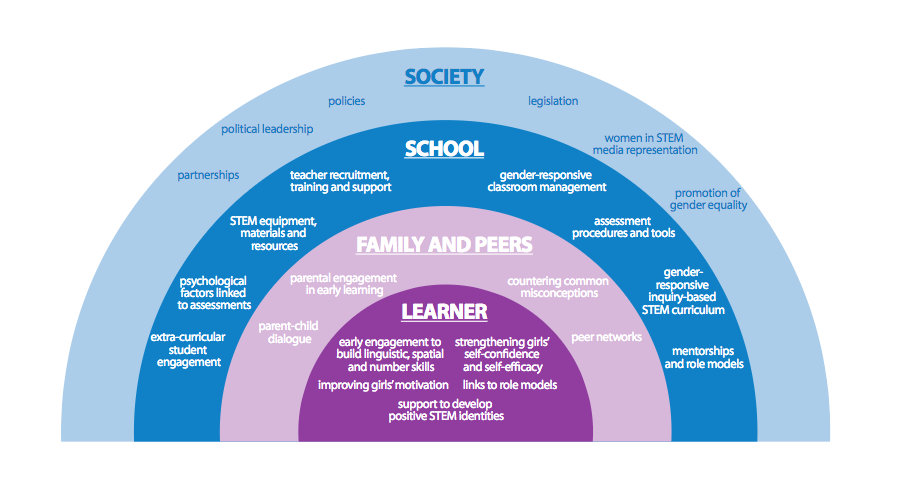
A diagram proposing methods to increase women's presence in STEM fields, acknowledging gender discrepancies in STEM participation. This shows the many social limitations to participation in science and technology in our current reality.

Interrogating scientific knowledge through introducing new theories and methods to feminist STS led to conflicts within the field related to the categories of sex and gender and how they are used in research. Trevor Pinch and Wiebe Bijker, SCOT researchers, proposed "interpretive flexibility" to explain different social group's varied responses to technology, gender reflected as a relevant social group. Pinch was critical of Woolgar's previous research on users of technology as the design process of technological products had not been considered, proposing "symmetry", where humans impact technology equal to how technology impacts humans. The symmetry approach addressed the co-constructive relationship between gender and technology, though was critiqued for ignoring historically-relevant power imbalances in how gender and technology relate to one another.

Wendy Faulkner became a notable critic of symmetry, encouraging an approach balancing symmetry's optimism with feminism's characteristic pessimism, which recognizes science and technology's relationship to hegemonic masculinity. This critique endorsed a return of the discipline to Donna Haraway's metaphor of the cyborg to assert women's presence in both technology design and technological cultures historically stereotyped as masculine, affirming the necessity of feminine characteristics in both design and use of technology. Faulkner addressed power imbalances not addressed by the social-constructivist approach, but the reliance on gendered labels was criticized for heteronormativity within a field which had recognized multiple gender representations distinct from binary sex roles. Faulkner's research presented a feminist perspective in which men inherently possessed masculinity, and women femininity, neglecting the material-semiotic nature of gender and technology adopted by feminist STS scholars proposing gender as co-created alongside, not prior-to, technology.

Judy Wajcman commented on the conflict and negotiation occurring within the discipline's research from the early 1980s until the turn of the century, crediting these debates for the complex understanding of gender-technology relationships developed by feminist STS. Cyberspace introduced new possibilities for research into the co-construction of gender and technology, both of which were no longer conceptualized by feminist STS as separate and fixed, but interconnected and multiple.

=== 2000s – present ===
Building upon prior research from two decades of feminist STS literature, studies adopted principles based on updated frameworks at the turn of the millennium, such as Ellen van Oost's research into how gender becomes configured into electric shavers, Ruth Schwartz Cowan's study on technological innovation increasing women's labor, and Jennifer R. Fishman's exploration of pharmaceutical technology's potential to designate potential consumers as dysfunctional. Research regarding decades of body modification practices in queer communities introduced material connections between gender and technology through individuals who represented and created diverse genders for themselves through physical alteration of their bodies, further establishing academic literature on gender beyond binary terminology and connecting queer theory to feminist STS.

Compared to past studies which were restricted to questioning the objectivity of scientific knowledge through the language used in descriptions of biological sex, researchers approached reproductive studies through a gender-based framework, Rayna Rapp emphasizing feminist ideology in her study of the impact of reproductive biomedicalization on women, while Laura Mamo's exploration of knowledge negotiation in lesbian reproduction six years later emphasized situated knowledges. Both studies found multiple possibilities of femininity reflected in their research subjects, similar to Wendy Faulkner's conclusions in her 2001 study on limitations to women's participation in engineering which proposes a radical shift in culture to emphasize the necessity of women in technology development to counteract masculinity being embedded in technological artefacts by men who create them. As with past feminist STS research, these studies were similarly critiqued for use of binary concepts like masculinity and femininity which suggested gender existed separate from its relationship to technology, contradicting the material-semiotic stance of the field.

Continuing with the user trials conducted alongside Trevor Pinch, Nelly Oudshoorn problematized creating technologies designed for use by everyone as different users have different needs. Oudshoorn's research explored the development of two digital cities, New Topia and DDS, created by development teams with intentions of being inclusive to a diverse range of users. By not considering needs of users which were impacted by identity, specifically gender, assumptions were made in the design process based on the designers gender, embedding these gendered assumptions into the technology. As the software engineers were male, the conclusion presented was that their products reflected masculinity, and though this acknowledges the co-construction of gender and technology, this conclusion was critiqued for reliance on binary historical concepts where gender is possessed rather than created.

Gender as an interactive, social performance in feminist STS is an achievement resulting from the historical evolution of feminism from the postmodern age in the 1970s to the feminist technoscience of the digital age, the nuances of this fluid history of many feminisms presented by Judy Wajcman in 2010. This complex process is a significant discovery, as much of the field's research prior to this point implied that all men possessed a fixed masculinity, contrasting researcher's claims of rejecting binary gender descriptions in their research. "Technofeminism" in STS strengthened connections between feminist STS and queer studies due to this overlapping gender theory, shifting the discipline towards research which no longer relied on determinism in labelling their subjects to criticize gender inequality and power dynamics in STS. This shift in epistemology appeared in research through studies on biohacking technologies, such as hormone injection, health supplements, and body implants, establishing a literal connection to Haraway's cyborg metaphor through physically linking bodies and machines in addition to a theoretical connection to the power these links hold to transcend the limits of the human body, specifically gender.

== Key concepts ==
=== Material-semiotics ===
Material-semiotic theory is a relativist theory in which the social does not exist separately from the material, used in feminist STS to describe the co-constructive relationship between humans and technology.

=== Situated knowledges ===
Situated knowledges are knowledges created from the subject's perspective, as opposed to knowledge written about a subject. Feminist STS relies on knowledge from marginalized realities, termed "subjugated knowledges", to explore realities beyond the understanding of scientific explanation.

=== Social constructivism ===
Social constructivism is a theoretical perspective in which knowledge is created through social interactions between entities, human or non-human.

== Impact ==
=== Contributions ===
Feminist STS has strengthened the stance of anti-objectivity within science and technology studies through its emphasis on situated knowledges. By positioning science as one of many perspectives on reality, feminist STS critiqued neutrality in science, asserting that knowledge is always created from a particular perspective regardless of whether that perspective is acknowledged or not. This rejection of a possibility to view the world as though one is separate from the world reinforced material-semiotics in the greater discipline.

=== Criticisms ===
The post-structuralism proposed by feminist STS's theory of multiple realities has been criticized by reductionist scholars who propose the existence of a single reality separate from human interaction. The discipline's reliance on feminist criticism has potentially contributed to alienating potential supporters, pushing them closer to theories of technological determinism.
