= Candystorm =

Candystorm is a loanword used in the German language and is the antonym of shitstorm. Green German MP Volker Beck gave distinction to the term by using it to describe a wave of party support for Claudia Roth's bid for Party leadership on Twitter in late 2012. Roth had just before failed in her bid to be nominated as the party's top candidate in the 2013 federal elections, and was rumored not to be running for re-election as party leader.

Volker Beck called in July 2013 for a "candystorm for Edward Snowden", calling for admission of Snowden under hashtag #snowstorm22.

== Cultural debate about the phenomenon ==
Axel Hoffmann, vice chairman of the liberal Friedrich Naumann Stiftung, saw this phenomenon as paradigmatic for the digital society: "The end of the liberal civil society is in sight. Shitstorm and candystorm rule." („Das Ende einer liberalen Bürgergesellschaft ist in Sicht. Der shit- oder candy-storm regiert.“)

== Press references ==
- Social Media Campaigning about candystorm in English 7 March 2013
- die tageszeitung (TAZ): Die kleine Wortkunde – „Candystorm“. Der neue #flausch., 11-12-2013

Newspapers:

- Süddeutsche Zeitung: Grünen-Parteichefin #Candystorm für Claudia, 12 November 2012
- Westdeutsche Allgemeine Zeitung: Candystorm - Claudia Roth freut sich über "Candystorm", 12 November 2012
- Frankfurter Allgemeine Zeitung: Candystorm, 13 November 2012
- Augsburger Allgemeine: Der "Candy-Storm" und eine grüne Feuerwehrcouch, 16. November 2012
- Hamburger Abendblatt: Nach der Urwahl - "Candystorm" für Claudia Roth im Internet, 12 November 2012
- Die Welt: Claudia Roth bleibt – dem Candystorm sei Dank, 12. November 2012
- Die Welt: Traumergebnis und realer Candystorm für Claudia Roth, 17. November 2012,
- Der Tagesspiegel: Candystorm statt Shitstorm auf Twitter, 12. November 2012
- Frankfurter Rundschau: Netzgemeinde - Claudia Roth und der erste Candystorm, 13 November 2012,
- die tageszeitung (TAZ): Die kleine Wortkunde – „Candystorm“. Der neue #flausch., 12. November 2012

Weekly magazines and newspapers:

- Focus, Tatjana Heid: Wiederwahl zur Grünen-Chefin. Grüne hätscheln Claudia Roth nach Urwahl-Desaster, 17 November 2012
- Medick, Veit (November 12, 2012). "Parteiaufruhr nach Grünen-Urwahl : Befehl zum Liebhaben". Der Spiegel.
- Stern: Claudia Roth im #candystorm, 12 November 2012
- Die Zeit: «Candystorm» für Claudia Roth im Internet, 12. November 2012
- Die Zeit: Candy-Storm, 15. November 2012

TV:

- tagesschau.de, Reaktionen auf Roths Bekenntnis zum Parteivorsitz - Von "Candystorms" und Wehners Zettel, 12 November 2012
- ZDF Netzschau: " Netzschau:-Candystorm-für-Claudia-Roth, 12 November 2012
- n-tv: "Candy-Storm" ermutigt Partei-Chefin. Roth macht weiter. 12 November 2012
