= Belissa Andía Pérez =

Peruvian activist and essayist (born 1953)

- Born: 7 July 1953 (age 72); Atico District, Peru
- Occupations: Human rights activist, transgender rights activist, essayist
- Political party: New Left Movement (Peru)
- Movement: Feminism, Transfeminism

Belissa Andía Pérez (born 7 July 1953, Atico) is a Peruvian activist and essayist. She is the "trans secretariat" of Instituto Runa de Desarrollo y Estudios sobre Género. She is also a member of the Junta and the secretary in the International Lesbian, Gay, Bisexual, Trans and Intersex Association, a Latin American organization that represents the interests of transsexuals. She is also a founding council member of the Hirschfeld Eddy Foundation. Andía Pérez is known for her fieldwork with transgender sex worker communities, which she uses to push for legal protections against transphobic state violence.

== Biography ==
Andía Pérez was born in Arequipa, Peru. She went to elementary school at San Antonio de Padua and secondary school at Bartolomé Herrera, where she served as a representative for the state school unit in plenary dialogue sessions. When she was a teenager, she came out to her family as a trans woman. She notes this was at a time when being queerness was very taboo and the transgender community lacked visibility, even within leftist spaces.

Andía Pérez attended the National University of San Marcos in pursuit of a degree focused on genetics, during which she became involved with Catholic organizations practicing liberation theology. She left these Christian groups later, due to ideological contradictions. She soon became more heavily involved in leftist organizations, such as the Vanguardia Revolucionaria, focused on meeting the demands of the working class and of sexual liberation, experience which would inform her later feminist theory.

Andía Pérez did not graduate university, and held a variety of short-term jobs while becoming involved with LGBTQ+ rights organizations such as the Homosexual Movement of Lima (MHOL). Andía Pérez also founded the Red Carnations in 2006, a transgender collective based in Lima that documents state violence against Transgender sex works, and provided shelter for those affected by HIV/AIDS complications.

In 2004, Andía Pérez became a member of the International Lesbian, Gay, Bisexual, Trans and Intersex Association's (IGLA's) World Board for the Latin American and Caribbean Region. By the next year, the group decided there needed to be a transgender official, leading to Andía Pérez's election at the 2005 Latin American Regional Conference.

Andía Pérez is also a secretary at the Runa Institute for Development and Gender Studies. Her work focuses on human rights, especially for transgender people, focusing on at-risk travesti communities. Andía Pérez has a particular focus on the travesti community, doing fieldwork with travesti sex workers and leading campaigns to push back on state violence and harassment of travestis. In June 2014, Andía Pérez spoke as a representative of Instituto Runa before the 26th Human Rights Council at the United Nations, participating on a panel on human rights of intersex people.

In 2006, Andía Pérez ran for the Congress of the Republic of Peru with the New Left Movement. She was not elected, but made history as the first transgender candidate in Peru's general elections. She has noted that she faced sexualization and transphobic harassment from the press during her campaign. In 2016, she ran as part of the leftist coalition El Frente Amplio por Vida for Representor at the Andean Parliament, but was not elected.

Andía Pérez starred in the 2011 film Loxoro, portraying a travesti mother searching for her missing daughter. In addition, she served an as uncredited screenwriter, rewriting the original script to orient the film towards the struggles of the travesti community and avoiding depicting transphobic stereotypes. Andía Pérez's involvement in the film is considered by some a crucial part of her transfeminist activism.

Andía Pérez's involvement in leftist organizations has led her to be sourced in investigations into the treatment of LGBTQ+ workers in laboral sectors. With this, Andía Pérez has advocated for greater inclusion of transgender individuals within labor unions and general labor organizing.

== Contributions to Feminist Theory ==
Andía Pérez speaks on the discrimination transgender people experience, appearing on Peruvian television and radio to denounce state violence. Namely, how there is a strong association of transgender people with sexually transmitted infections and mental illness. She notes: "We [transgender people] do not have a place in society because of normalisation and narrow-minded views, even today some countries punish by law people whose conduct does not conform to their ideas of a binary, man-woman world." She has also observed that transgender people are "rebels of the rule of heteronormativity, and not only in the conceptual sense, but also in the physical bodies of transgender people."

Andía Pérez is considered one of the most radical voices in feminist, particularly transgender feminist, activism. Her contributions to feminist theory typically take the form of short essays and films, Loxoro being an example. Her transfeminist activism argues the rethinking of gender and sex and the consideration of the role of state violence and various forms of oppression in gender, taking on a "radically anti-essentialist" theory of gender.

== Filmography ==
- Loxoro (2011)

== See also ==
- LGBT rights in Peru
- Jacques Teyssier
- Travesti
