= Gloria Careaga Pérez =

Mexican social psychologist

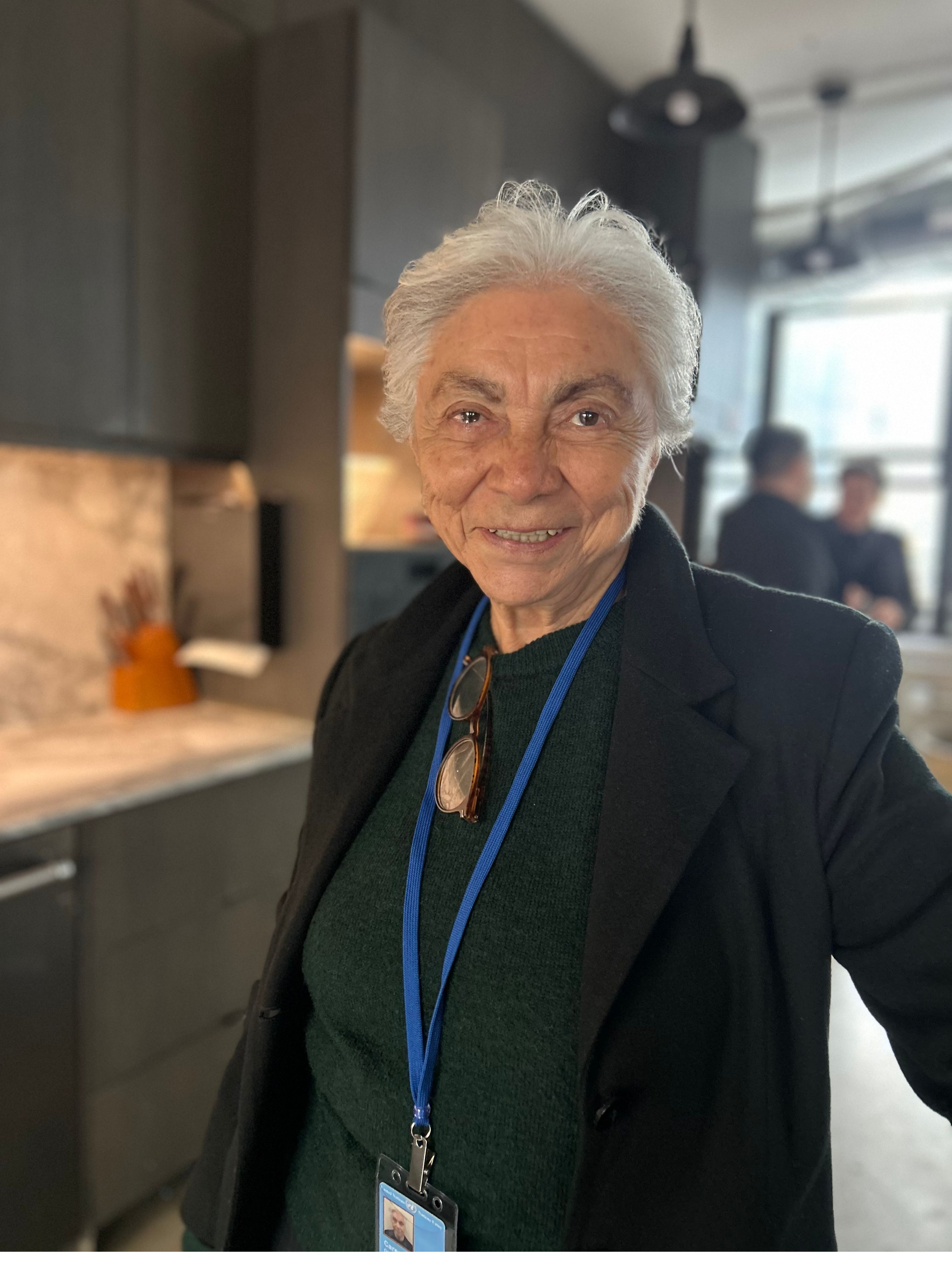
Gloria Angélica Careaga Pérez at an event in New York City during the 69th Session of the Commission on the Status of Women in March 2025

Gloria Angélica Careaga Pérez (born 1947) is a Mexican social psychologist and feminist. She has taught at the Faculty of Psychology in the National Autonomous University of Mexico since 1979. She is co-founder of Mexican organization El Closet de Sor Juana and former co-Secretary General of the International Lesbian, Gay, Bisexual, Trans and Intersex Association. She is currently the director and founder of the Arcoíris Foundation, is part of the Advisory Council of El Clóset de Sor Juana and is an academic at UNAM. In January 2018 she was elected as an alternate member of the Civil Society Advisory Group of UN Women in Latin America and the Caribbean.

== Biography ==
Careaga Pérez was born in Guadalajara on 28 January 1947. She received her bachelor's degree in psychology from the Western Institute of Technology and Higher Education. She then earned her master's in social psychology from the National Autonomous University of Mexico (UNAM). She started teaching at the UNAM as a member of the Psychology Faculty in 1979. The focus of her work is the study of sexuality and society and, more recently, gender. She co-founded the university's gender studies program in 1992. In 1998 she established a Sexual Diversity Studies department and taught new perspectives on the analysis of masculinity. Careaga coordinated six anthologies and has published numerous articles and book chapters.

In 1992, Careaga-Pérez and Patria Jiménez founded the lesbian organization "El clóset de Sor Juana" (Sister Juana's closet), one of Mexico's most important LGBT organizations. It was accredited as an NGO by the United Nations for the Fourth World Conference on Women.

She is also co-founder of Fundacion Arcoiris, a group that studies sexuality. Together with Beto de Jesus, she represents the Latin America and Caribbean region on the executive board of the International Lesbian and Gay Association (ILGA). During the September 1999 ILGA general meeting she was elected representative of the Women's Secretariat. In 2008 she was elected co-Secretary General of ILGA with Renato Sabbadini. They were both reelected at ILGA world conferences in 2010 and 2012.

Along with Marta Lamas, Ana Amuchástegui, and Norma Mogrovejo, she played an important role in the development of a discourse around sexual diversity within Mexican academia.

Careaga Pérez is a member of the International Working Group on Sexuality and Social Policy (IWGSSP) at Columbia University, the International Fund Advisory Panel of the Astraea Lesbian Foundation for Justice, the International Advisory Board of the International Gay and Lesbian Human Rights Commission (IGLHRC) and the advisory board of the Hirschfeld Eddy Foundation.
