= Utta Isop =

Austrian author & educator (born 1974)

Utta Isop (born 1974 in Klagenfurt) is an Austrian philosopher and gender researcher, author and editor. Her main focuses are gender democracy, unconditional basic income, solidarity economy, and social movements.

== Biography ==
Utta Isop studied law from 1992 to 1994, and from 1992 to 2002 a double degree in teaching (philosophy, psychology, pedagogics, and German) and philosophy as a combination of subjects at the University of Vienna. In May 2002 she received her diploma in philosophy with a thesis entitled "Sociogenesis of the Social. Reflections based on Bourdieu, Groeben, Mead, Vygotsky." In July 2004, she passed the teacher's examination with the following topics: social sciences as a school subject, Otto Neurath's picture pedagogy, and multilingualism as a national educational concept. In 2005, she was on parental leave. Since 2006 she has been working as a teacher at the Bundesrealgymnasium Klagenfurt-Viktring.

From 2005 to 2016, she taught philosophy and gender studies as a staff member of the University of Klagenfurt. She was part of the inter-faculty research network Culture & Conflict, which has existed at the University of Klagenfurt since 2005. The first publication documenting the results of the research project is Spielregeln der Gewalt. Kulturwissenschaftliche Beiträge zur Friedens- und Geschlechterforschung, (2009, edited by Utta Isop, Viktorija Ratković and Werner Wintersteiner).

In 2013, she was awarded the Prize for Civic Courage by the Austrian Students' Association in Klagenfurt in the category of teachers, because, according to the jury, she "constantly rises above convention and expresses criticism of unfair conditions."

== Reception ==
Together with the media and communication scientist Viktorija Ratković, Utta Isop published the volume Differenzen leben in 2011. The review in the journal Femina Politica concluded: "The strengths of the book lie in its diverse examination of different aspects of inclusion and exclusion in relation to the category of gender in connection with - primarily - the categories of ethnicity and sexuality."

Utta Isop wrote the introduction to the book Gewalt im beruflichen Alltag (Everyday Violence on the Job), published in 2017, and a preface to each chapter. According to the review of the book by Gerd Krüger, Professor at the Hamburg University of Applied Sciences, in her introduction she critically examines the prevailing understanding of democracy and notes that in contemporary political discussion the everyday experience of democracy in the family, at work and in leisure time is hardly reflected upon. She doubts that the common practice of voting makes "societies capable of democracy in the long run". Her criticism of hierarchy and the demand for a new understanding of democracy are central.

== Memberships ==
She is a member of, among others, the associations Unabhängiger Interessensverband für Geschlechterdemokratie (Klagenfurt) and Solidarische Ökonomie (Vienna) as well as the Austrian Society for Gender Studies, the Society for Women in Philosophy and the Initiative 2010 "Linke Organisierung". In 2010 she was chairwoman of the association Freundinnen der Frauenfrühlingsuniversität (Carinthia). She is also involved in the feminist movement: she is a member of the Association of Feminist Scientists. For the Alliance for One World, she is a substitute member of the Development Policy Advisory Board of the State of Carinthia.

== Publications (selection) ==
Editors and contributions as author

- (Ed.): Gewalt im beruflichen Alltag. Wie Hierarchien, Einschlüsse und Ausschlüsse wirken. Berichte von Intersektionen institutioneller Gewalt (= Materialien der AG SPAK. M 306). AG SPAK Bücher, Neu-Ulm 2017, ISBN 978-3-945959-09-1 (darin u. a.: Fifty Shades of Grey und Gewalt im Betrieb. p. 65 ff.).
- with Viktorija Ratkovic, Werner Wintersteiner (Ed.): Spielregeln der Gewalt. Kulturwissenschaftliche Beiträge zur Friedens- und Geschlechterforschung (= Kultur & Konflikt. Bd. 1). Transcript, Bielefeld 2009, ISBN 978-3-8376-1175-5.
- with Alice Pechriggl, Kirstin Mertlitsch, Brigitte Hipfl (Ed.): Über Geschlechterdemokratie hinaus = Beyond gender democracy (= DravaDiskurs). Drava-Verlag, Klagenfurt u. a. 2009, ISBN 978-3-85435-593-9 (darin: »Geschlechterbasisdemokratie. Fünf Forderungen queerer Politik?«. p. 45 ff.).
- with Viktorija Ratkovic (Ed.): Differenzen leben. Kulturwissenschaftliche und geschlechterkritische Perspektiven auf Inklusion und Exklusion (= Kultur & Konflikt. Bd. 3). Transcript, Bielefeld 2011, ISBN 978-3-8376-1528-9 (darin: »Enough is enough« – »Ya basta!«. Kein Gott, keine Nation, kein Konzern, kein Ehemann. p. 210 ff.).
- with Jacob Guggenheimer, Doris Leibetseder, Kirstin Mertlitsch (Ed.): "When we were gender …". Geschlechter erinnern und vergessen. Analysen von Geschlecht und Gedächtnis in den Gender Studies, Queer-Theorien und feministischen Politiken (= Kultur & Konflikt. Bd. 5). Transcript, Bielefeld 2013, ISBN 978-3-8376-2397-0 (darin u. a.: Gegenkulturelle Archive jenseits von Familie und Geschlecht (mit Mate Cosic, Johannes Dollinger, Doris Leibetseder). p. 245 ff.).

Contributions in other anthologies

- „Menschen werden“ – Gefährdetes und entfremdetes Leben zwischen Flucht und Sorgen, mit Heide Hammer, in: Brigitte Buchhammer (Ed.): Lernen, Mensch zu sein. Beiträge des 2. Symposiums der SWIP Austria, Linz, Johannes-Kepler-Universität, 10.-11. Dezember 2015 , Lit Verlag, Berlin/Münster/Wien/Zürch/London 2017, ISBN 978-3-643-50801-0, p. 253–271
- Institutionelle Gewalt: die Lust am Hierarchisieren – Einschließen – Ausschließen, in: Brigitte Buchhammer (Ed.): Neuere Aspekte in der Philosophie. Aktuelle Projekte von Philosophinnen am Forschungsstandort Österreich, Axia Academic Publishers, Wien 2015, ISBN 978-3-903068-17-9, p. 298–327
- Praktiken der Selbstorganisation. Losdemokratie. Rotation und Sorgearbeit, in: Claudia Brunner et al. (Ed.): Prekariat und Freiheit? Feministische Wissenschaft, Kulturkritik und Selbstorganisation, Verlag Westfälisches Dampfboot, Münster 2013, ISBN 978-3-89691-929-8, p. 242–252
- Demokratie im Alltag – Demokratie im Betrieb 4.0. In: Peter Granig, Erich Hartlieb, Bernhard Heiden (Ed.): Mit Innovationsmanagement zu Industrie 4.0. Grundlagen, Strategien, Erfolgsfaktoren. Springer Gabler, Wiesbaden 2018, ISBN 978-3-658-11666-8, p. 203–212.
