= Claudia Roth =

German politician (born 1955)

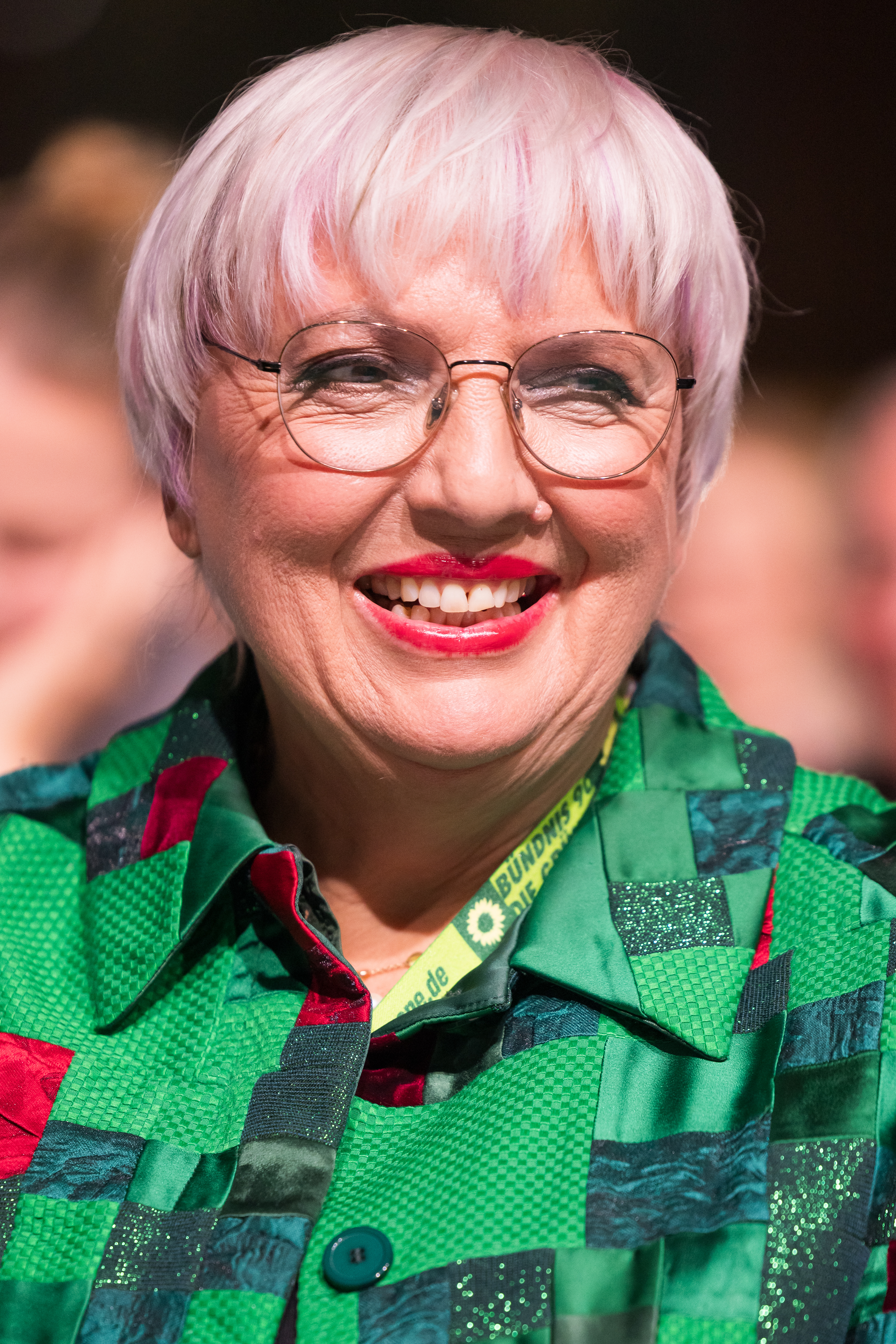
- Roth in 2024

Minister of State in the Chancellery Federal Commissioner for Culture and the Media
- In office 8 December 2021 – 6 May 2025
- Chancellor: Olaf Scholz
- Preceded by: Monika Grütters
- Succeeded by: Wolfram Weimer

Vice President of the Bundestag (on proposal of the Alliance 90/The Greens-faction)
- In office 22 October 2013 – 8 December 2021
- President: Norbert Lammert; Wolfgang Schäuble; Bärbel Bas
- Preceded by: Katrin Göring-Eckardt
- Succeeded by: Katrin Göring-Eckardt

Leader of the Alliance 90/The Greens
- In office 2 October 2004 – 19 October 2013 Serving with Reinhard Bütikofer and Cem Özdemir
- Preceded by: Angelika Beer
- Succeeded by: Simone Peter
- In office 9 March 2001 – 7 December 2002 Serving with Fritz Kuhn
- Preceded by: Renate Künast
- Succeeded by: Angelika Beer

Federal Commissioner for Human Rights and Humanitarian Aid
- In office 14 March 2003 – 2 October 2004
- Chancellor: Gerhard Schröder
- Minister: Joschka Fischer
- Preceded by: Gerd Poppe
- Succeeded by: Tom Koenigs

Member of the Bundestag
- Incumbent
- Assumed office 17 October 2002
- Constituency: Bavaria
- In office 26 October 1998 – 31 March 2001
- Preceded by: multi-member district
- Succeeded by: Gerald Häfner
- Constituency: Alliance 90/The Greens List

Member of the European Parliament for Germany
- In office 25 July 1989 – 18 November 1998
- Preceded by: multi-member district
- Succeeded by: Ozan Ceyhun

Personal details
- Born: 15 May 1955 (age 71) Ulm, West Germany
- Party: German: Alliance 90/The Greens; EU: The Greens–European Free Alliance

Claudia Benedikta Roth (German: [ˈklaʊdi̯a ˈʁoːt]; born 15 May 1955) is a German politician (Alliance 90/The Greens) and member of the Bundestag.

In addition to her work in parliament, Roth served as Federal Government Commissioner for Culture and the Media in the government of Chancellor Olaf Scholz from 2021 to 2025. She was one of the two party chairs from 2004 to 2013 and previously served as one of the vice presidents of the Bundestag.

== Biography ==
Roth was born in Ulm, Germany. She began her artistic work, which she always regarded as also being political, in the 1970s as a trained artistic director at a theatre in Memmingen. She then worked at the municipal theatre in Dortmund and the Hoffmanns-Comic-Teater, and subsequently began managing the political rock band "Ton Steine Scherben" until 1985, when the band disbanded due to the band's high debt burden.

She came into contact with the Green party on election campaign tours. In 1985, she became press spokesperson for the Green Party's parliamentary group in the Bundestag, despite being a newcomer to this line of work.

=== Member of the European Parliament ===
In West Germany's 1989 European elections, Roth was elected for the first time as a Member of the European Parliament for the Greens.

Roth served as a member of the new Committee on Civic Liberties and Internal Affairs, the Committee on Foreign Affairs and the Sub-Committee on Human Rights. In addition, she was a member of two committees of inquiry in the European Parliament, namely the Committee of Inquiry into Racism and Xenophobia and the Committee of Inquiry into Links between Organized Crime and Drugs, as well as of the EC-Turkey Joint Parliamentary Committee.

From 1989 to 1990, Roth briefly served as deputy chairperson of the Green Group in the European Parliament.

In the 1994 European elections, Roth was again elected to the European Parliament as a lead candidate of Alliance 90/The Greens. She was chairperson of the Green Group in the European Parliament until 1998, first alongside co-chairman Alexander Langer (1994–1995) and later Magda Aelvoet (1995–1998). During this second term as an MEP, she was again a member of the European Parliament Committee on Civil Liberties, Justice and Home Affairs, the Sub-Committee on Human Rights and the EC-Turkey Joint Parliamentary Committee, of which she was elected deputy chairperson. She also remained involved with the Committee on Foreign Affairs as a substitute member.

=== Member of the German Bundestag ===
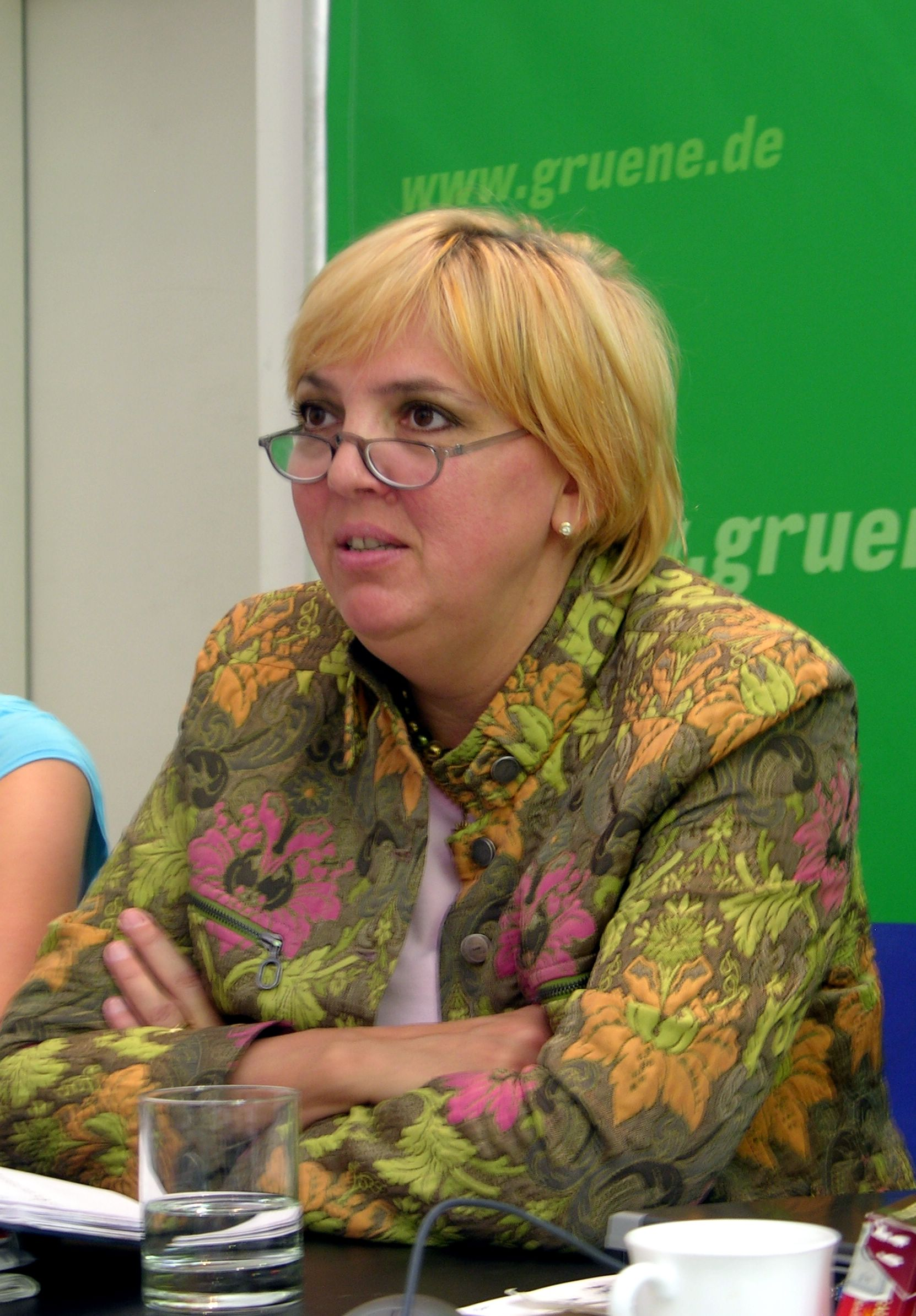
Roth in 2005

Claudia Roth ended her work as an MEP when she became part of the Alliance 90/The Greens parliamentary group in the Bundestag after the 1998 German federal election. She became a member of the Committee on the Affairs of the European Union and a substitute member of the Committee on Internal Affairs of the German Bundestag. Furthermore, she was elected chairperson of the newly established Committee on Human Rights and Humanitarian Aid.

On 9 March 2001, Roth was elected Federal chairperson of Alliance 90/The Greens at the party conference in Stuttgart and resigned as a Member of the Bundestag at the end of March 2001 as a result. At the same time, she was spokesperson of the Alliance 90/The Greens on women's affairs.

In the 2002 national elections, Roth was elected to the Bundestag as Bavarian lead candidate for Alliance 90/The Greens. Since then, she has been a member of the Bundestag's Committee on Foreign Affairs and the Committee on Cultural and Media Affairs. She is also cultural affairs spokesperson for the Alliance 90/The Greens parliamentary group in the Bundestag and chairperson of the German-Turkish Parliamentary Friendship Group.

Between March 2003 and October 2004, in Chancellor Gerhard Schröder's second cabinet, Roth served as the Federal Government Commissioner for Human Rights Policy and Humanitarian Aid at the Federal Foreign Office.

Roth became federal chairperson of Alliance 90/The Greens again in October 2004 and was re-elected as such several times, most recently in November 2010. In 2012, she failed to become the number-one woman in the campaign for the 2013 national elections. After this defeat she was unsure to run again for the position of leader of the party's board. Fellow party member Volker Beck started a support campaign in favour of her in social media networks and called it candystorm. The party members subsequently re-elected Roth with 88.5 percent backing.

Roth served as deputy chairwoman of the German-Iranian Parliamentary Friendship Group between 2005 and 2009 and held the same office in the German-Turkish Friendship Group between 2005 and 2013.

=== Vice-President of the German Bundestag ===
Roth was elected as Vice-President of the German Bundestag on 22 October 2013. In addition, she is a member of the parliament's Council of Elders, which – among other duties – determines daily legislative agenda items and assigning committee chairpersons based on party representation. She also serves as a member of the Committee on Economic Cooperation and Development as well as of the Sub-Committee on Cultural Relations and Education Policy. In addition, she is a member of the Art Advisory Board of the German Bundestag.

In the unsuccessful negotiations to form a coalition government with the Christian Democrats – both the Christian Democratic Union (CDU) and the Christian Social Union in Bavaria (CSU) – and the Free Democratic Party (FDP) following the 2017 national elections, Roth was part of the 14-member delegation of the Green Party. In the negotiations to form a so-called traffic light coalition of the Social Democrats (SPD), the Green Party and the FDP following the 2021 federal elections, she led her party's delegation in the working group on cultural affairs and media; her co-chairs from the other parties are Carsten Brosda and Otto Fricke.

== Political career ==
- 1985–1989: Press spokeswoman for the Green party of West Germany
- 1985–1998: Member of the European Parliament (Chairwoman of the Green Party faction from 1994 to 1998)
- 1998 – March 2001: Member of the Green Party faction in the German Parliament (Bundestag)
  - Chairwoman of the Human Rights Board in the German Parliament
- March 2001 – December 2002: Chairwoman of the German Green Party (together with Fritz Kuhn)
- 22 September 2002 – present: Member of the Green Party faction in the Bundestag
- October 2004 – October 2013: Chairwoman of the German Green Party (together with Reinhard Bütikofer until 2008, then Cem Özdemir)
- 22 October 2013 – present: Vice president of the Bundestag

== Political positions ==
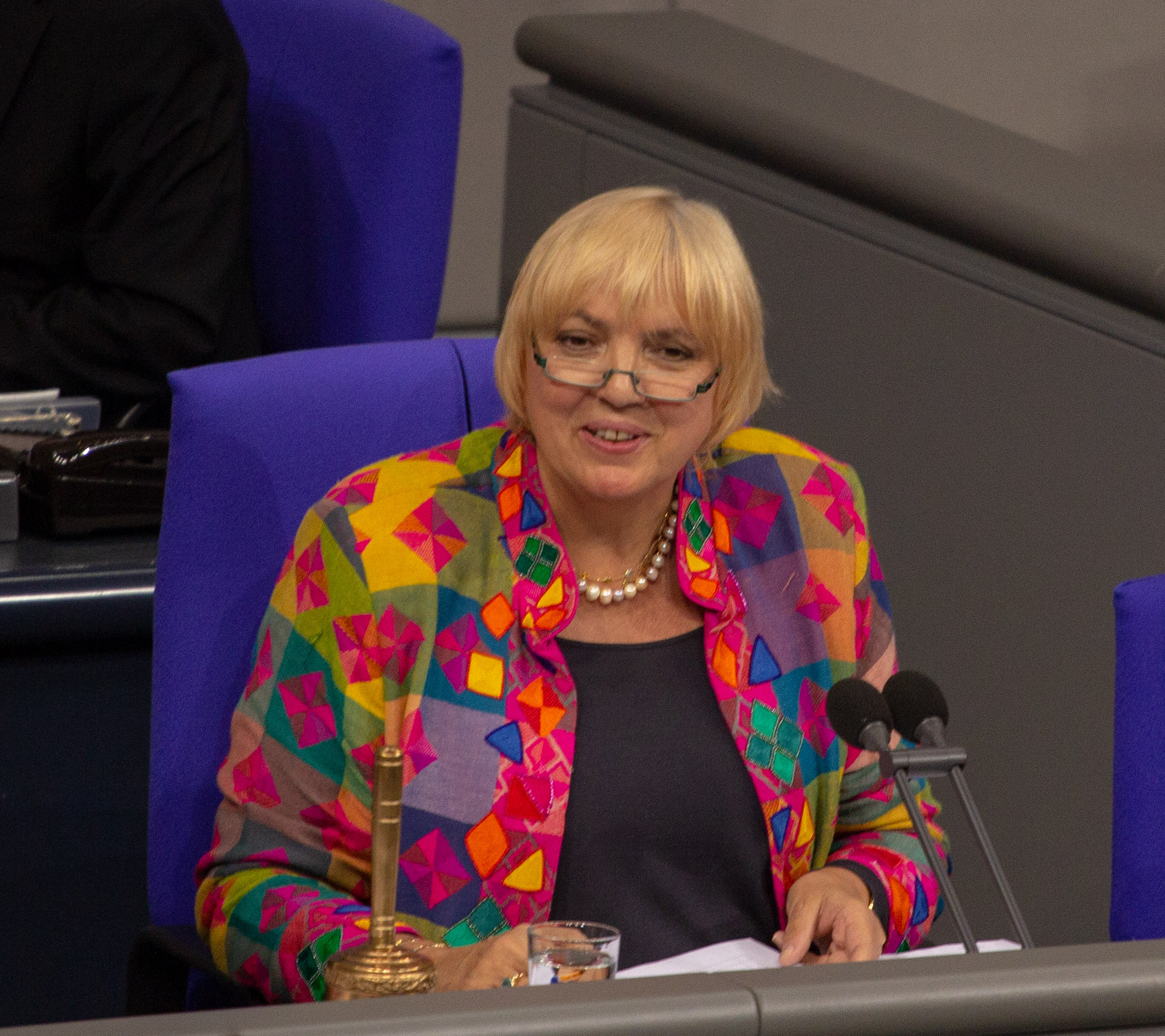
Roth in 2019

=== On Turkey ===
Since her time at the European Parliament, Roth has regularly criticized the European Union's "determination to hold Turkey at bay." In 1995, she expressed doubts about Prime Minister Tansu Çiller's ability to bring about human rights reforms as a condition for a European Union–Turkey Customs Union. In June 2013, Roth was at the surroundings of the Taksim Square when the police intervened to evacuate Gezi Park and was among those affected by the tear gas fired by security officers. Following the victory of Recep Tayyip Erdoğan in the 2014 presidential election, she criticized the "dramatic erosion of the democratic system in Turkey."

In May 2017, Roth canceled a visit of a parliamentary delegation to Turkey where participants had planned to talk to opposition lawmakers, governors and rights groups about that year's constitutional referendum, saying Ankara had refused to give them a security detail.

=== On right-wing extremism ===
In 2006, Roth was investigated for displaying a crossed-out swastika on multiple occasions (although she does not support Nazism). She has also called for tougher action against right-wing extremists.

=== On the death penalty ===
In 2008, Roth publicly urged incoming U.S. president Barack Obama to "be pushing for the banning of the death penalty, not for upholding it. The death penalty is the biggest blow against human rights and the right to live. He is not in a position to determine whether people live or die, not even in punishing them for the worst crimes!" Speaking in her capacity as leader of the Green Party and underlining the profound divergence in opinion concerning capital punishment in the United States and Western Europe, Roth called the execution of Troy Davis in 2011 "a cynical and inhumane spectacle that occasions mourning and horror." She has also spoken out against capital punishment on numerous other occasions, including the execution of the LaGrand brothers in 1999 which she attended.

=== On patriarchal beauty standards ===
In 2015, Roth responded to critics of her appearance, stating that for her to have the wart on her nose removed would be "surrender to the patriarchal standards of beauty pushed by the oppressive right-wing".

=== On the use of military force ===
Shortly after the U.S. launched military operations in Afghanistan in October 2001, Roth criticized the use of antipersonnel cluster bombs was "not appropriate". Her statement came a day after some 10,000 people, some of them carrying banners that said "Against repression and war" and "The American way of life is too expensive for our world," turned out in Berlin in a peaceful protest against the bombings. When the members of the Green Party later defied their pacifist roots and voted overwhelmingly in favor of sending German soldiers to Afghanistan as part of NATO-led security mission ISAF, Roth maintained that "[the Greens] are and remain an antiwar party. But I think that under certain circumstances it must be possible to engage militarily in order to stop violence."

As a consequence, Roth has in the past voted in favor of German participation in United Nations peacekeeping missions as well as in United Nations-mandated European Union peacekeeping missions on the African continent, such as in Somalia (2009, 2010), Darfur/Sudan (2010, 2011, 2012, 2013, 2014 and 2015), South Sudan (2011, 2012, 2013, 2014 and 2015), Mali (2014, 2015) and the Central African Republic (2014). In 2013 and 2014, she abstained from the vote on continuing German participation in Operation Atalanta in Somalia, and she voted has against the European Union Training Mission Somalia (2014, 2015 and 2016).

=== Arms exports ===
In 2010, Roth publicly called for "more stringent control over and sharper criteria governing arms exports." In 2014, she – alongside fellow Green Party parliamentarians Katja Keul and Hans-Christian Ströbele – lodged a complaint before the Federal Constitutional Court of Germany, arguing that it was unconstitutional for the government to keep the Bundestag in the dark about planned arms deals because it prevented the parliament from fulfilling its role of keeping the government in check. The court ruled that while the government did not have to disclose information about planned defense exports, it did have an obligation to provide the Bundestag with details, on request, once specific arms deals had been approved. In a 2015 interview with Welt am Sonntag, Roth singled out exports to Saudi Arabia for criticism, calling the country "the top terror exporter in the Middle East" and raising concerns that the country's leaders may turn weapons sold by Germany on their own people.

=== Relations with Tibet ===
Roth has met the Dalai Lama several times during her time in parliament and has been a supporter of the Tibet movement. In 2015, Roth addressed the official commemoration of the 56th Tibetan National Uprising day alongside Sikyong Lobsang Sangay in Dharamshala. Alongside Robert Badinter and Karel Schwarzenberg, she became one of the first signers of the 2015 Paris Declaration which calls for European governments to develop a coordinated approach in addressing China's policies in Tibet.

== Other activities (selection) ==
- Documentation and Cultural Centre of German Sinti and Roma, Member of the Board of Trustees
- Culture Foundation of the German Football Association (DFB), Member of the Board of Trustees
- Denkwerk Demokratie, Member of the Advisory Board
- Deutsche Gesellschaft für Internationale Zusammenarbeit (GIZ), Member of the Board of Trustees
- 2011 FIFA Women's World Cup, Member of the Environmental Advisory Board
- Goethe-Institut, Delegate to the General Meeting
- Humanist Union, Member of the Advisory Board
- International Committee for the Liberation of the Kurdish Parliamentarians Imprisoned in Turkey, Vice President
- International Journalists' Programmes, Member of the Board of Trustees
- Tarabya Academy, Member of the Advisory Board
- University of Augsburg, Member of the Board of Trustees
- European Monitoring Centre on Racism and Xenophobia, Member of the board of directors (2002–2006)
- German Football Association (DFB), Member of the Sustainability Council (2009–2013)
- German Orient Foundation, Member of the Board of Trustees (2002–2006)

== Recognition ==
- 2004 – Chevalier de la Légion d'Honneur
- 2014 – Bavarian Order of Merit

== Criticism ==
Roth has been criticized for her positive relations with the Islamic Republic of Iran. Along with fellow lawmakers Günter Gloser, Monika Grütters, Luc Jochimsen and Peter Gauweiler, she travelled to Iran in 2010 to meet with Ali Larijani, Manouchehr Mottaki and others; the trip was heavily criticized by international human rights organizations. In February 2013, she was reprimanded by German media outlets and Iranian dissidents for warmly greeting the Iranian ambassador to Germany, Alireza Sheikhattar, with a high five; Iranian Kurdish dissidents hold Sheikhattar responsible for the murder of Kurds during his tenure as governor of Iran's Kurdistan and West Azerbaijan provinces from 1980 to 1985.

In 2015, Roth again led a German parliamentary delegation for a five-day visit to Tehran, including meetings with Iranian Parliament Speaker Ali Larijani, Deputy Speaker Mohammad-Hassan Aboutorabi Fard, Deputy Foreign Minister Majid Takht-Ravanchi, presidential candidate Mohammad Reza Aref as well as two of President Hassan Rouhani's deputies namely Shahindokht Molaverdi, the vice president for women's affairs, and Masoumeh Ebtekar, the vice president and chairwoman of the Department of Environment; she was, however, denied a meeting with human-rights activist Narges Mohammadi.

In late February 2024, as the German Minister of Culture, Roth faced criticism from German politicians for permitting what were perceived as "anti-Semitic" remarks by two filmmakers— one of Jewish-Israeli and the other of Muslim Palestinian heritage— during the Berlinale film festival. The filmmakers criticized Israel's actions against the Palestinian populations of Gaza and the West Bank, in their various forms, prominently on the festival stage. After widespread criticism, Roth's ministry released a press statement claiming that she had only applauded for the Israeli filmmaker and not for the Palestinian one.

== Personal life ==
Roth lives in Berlin's Charlottenburg district.
