= Cynthia Cockburn =

British academic, feminist and peace activist

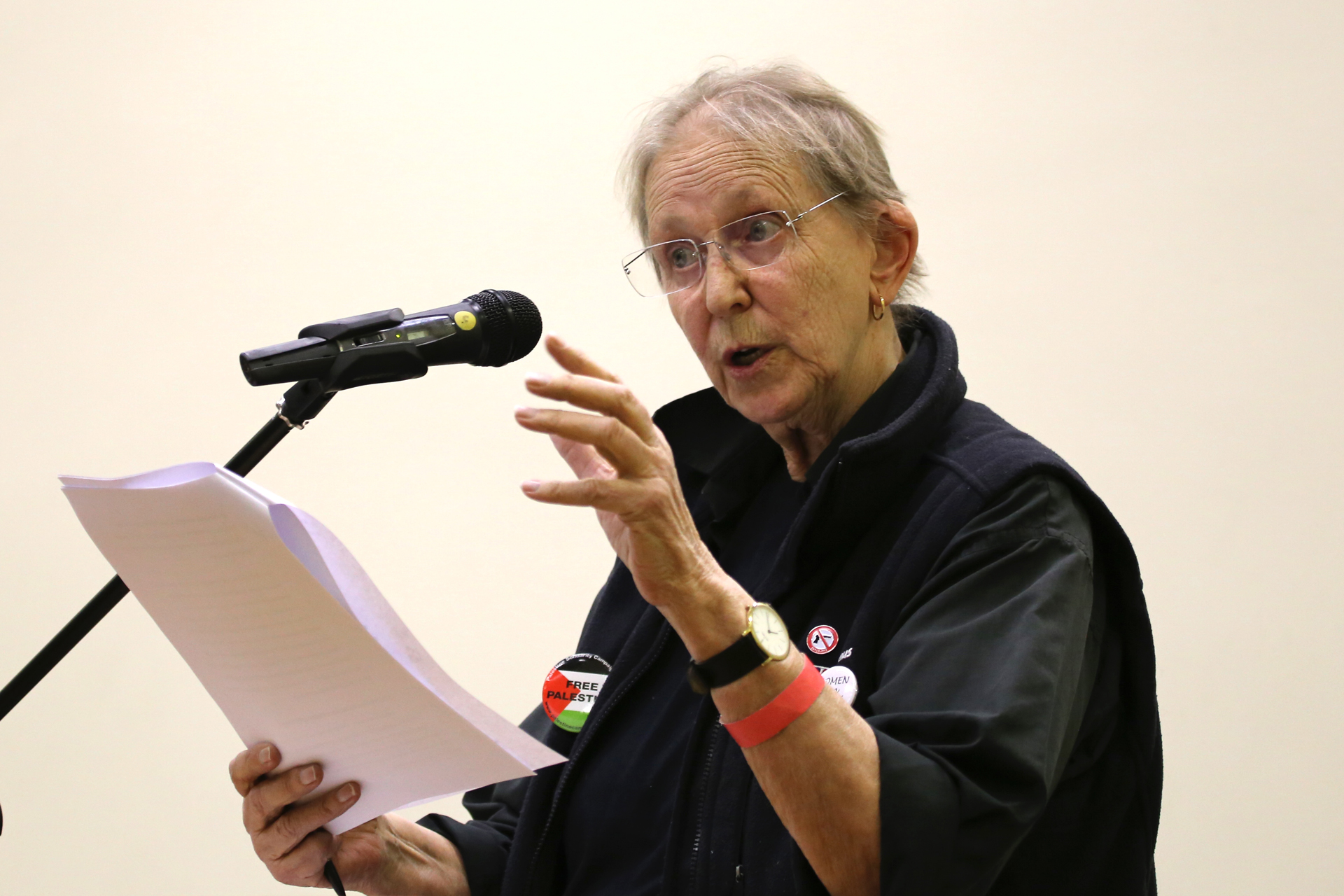
- Born: Cynthia Kay Ellis; 24 July 1934; Barrow upon Soar, Leicestershire, England
- Died: 12 September 2019 (aged 85)

Academic work
- Institutions: City University London (visiting professor), University of Warwick (honorary professor)
- Notable ideas: Antimilitarism, gender democracy

Cynthia Kay Cockburn (née Ellis; 24 July 1934 – 12 September 2019) was a British academic, feminist, and peace activist.

== Early life ==
Cynthia Kay Ellis was born in Barrow upon Soar, a village in rural Leicestershire, to father Shirley Ellis and mother Constance (née King). She attended Malvern St James Girls School.

== Career ==
Cockburn was a researcher in the fields of gender, war and peace-making, labour processes and trade unionism, and refugees. She was active in the international women's peace movement.

Cockburn was a visiting professor in the Department of Sociology at City University London and honorary professor in the Centre for the Study of Women and Gender at the University of Warwick.

An active antimilitarist, she was involved in a number of peace and anti-war organisations. She visited the Greenham Common Women's Peace Camp between 1981 and 2000. In 1981, she was part of a group of women who founded Women Against War in the Gulf, and in response to the Bosnian Yugoslav wars, the group evolved to become Women Against War Crime. From 1993, they began calling the group Women in Black in support of other international peace movement efforts, specifically those taking place in Israel, Italy, and Yugoslavia. She was also involved with Women Against Fundamentalism, the European Forum of Socialist Feminists, and was a member of the Women's International League for Peace & Freedom.

As both an academic and activist, Cockburn presented talks at a number of conferences. In May 2017, she was honoured at the Gender and Peace Conference in Istanbul, and presented the keynote address.

Cockburn was selected to be featured in the British Library project, 'Sisterhood and After', an oral history archive of feminists active in the 1970–1980s.

On 14 October 2017, the journal Feminist Review celebrated Cockburn's contribution to feminist scholarship by co-hosting an event with the SOAS Centre for Gender Studies and provided free access to a number of her published articles.

Cockburn was widely published in academic journals, including in Feminist Review, Gender & Development, Journal of Classical Sociology, Peace in Process. She also wrote for The Guardian, Red Pepper, Peace News, IndyMedia UK, and OpenDemocracy.

== Publications ==
Cockburn published a number of academic books including:

- The Local State: Management of Cities and People (1977, Pluto Press)
- In and Against the State (1981, Pluto Press)
- Brothers: Male Dominance and Technical Change (1983, Pluto Press)
- Machinery of Dominance: Women, Men and Technical Know-how (1985, Pluto Press)
- Two-Track Training: Sex Inequalities and the Youth Training Scheme (1987, Macmillan)
- In the Way of Women: Men's Resistance to Sex Equality in Organizations (1991, Macmillan)
- Gender and Technology in the Making (1993, Sage Publications, with Susan Ormrod)
- Bringing Technology Home: Gender and Technology in a Changing Europe (1994, Oxford University Press, with Ruza Furst-Dilic)
- Women in the Europeanizing of Industrial Relations: A Study in Five Member States (1994, European Commission, with Maria Carmen Alemany Gomez, Myriam Bergamaschi, Hildegard Maria Nickel, and Chantal Rogerat)
- The Space Between Us: Negotiating Gender and National Identities in Conflict (1998, Zed Books)
- The Postwar Moment: Militaries, Masculinities and International Peacekeeping (2002, Lawrence and Wishar, with Dubravka Zarkov)
- The Line: Women, Partition and the Gender Order in Cyprus (2004, Zed Books)
- From Where We Stand: War, Women’s Activism and Feminist Analysis (2007, Zed Books)
- Antimilitarism: Political and Gender Dynamics of Peace Movements (2012, Palgrave Macmillan)
- Looking to London: Stories of War, Escape and Asylum (2017, Pluto Press)

Publications by Cockburn have been translated into German, Russian, Turkish, Japanese, Georgian, Bosnian, Serbo-Croat, Bulgarian, Greek, Spanish, Korean, and Catalan.
