= Volker Beck (politician) =

German politician (born 1960)

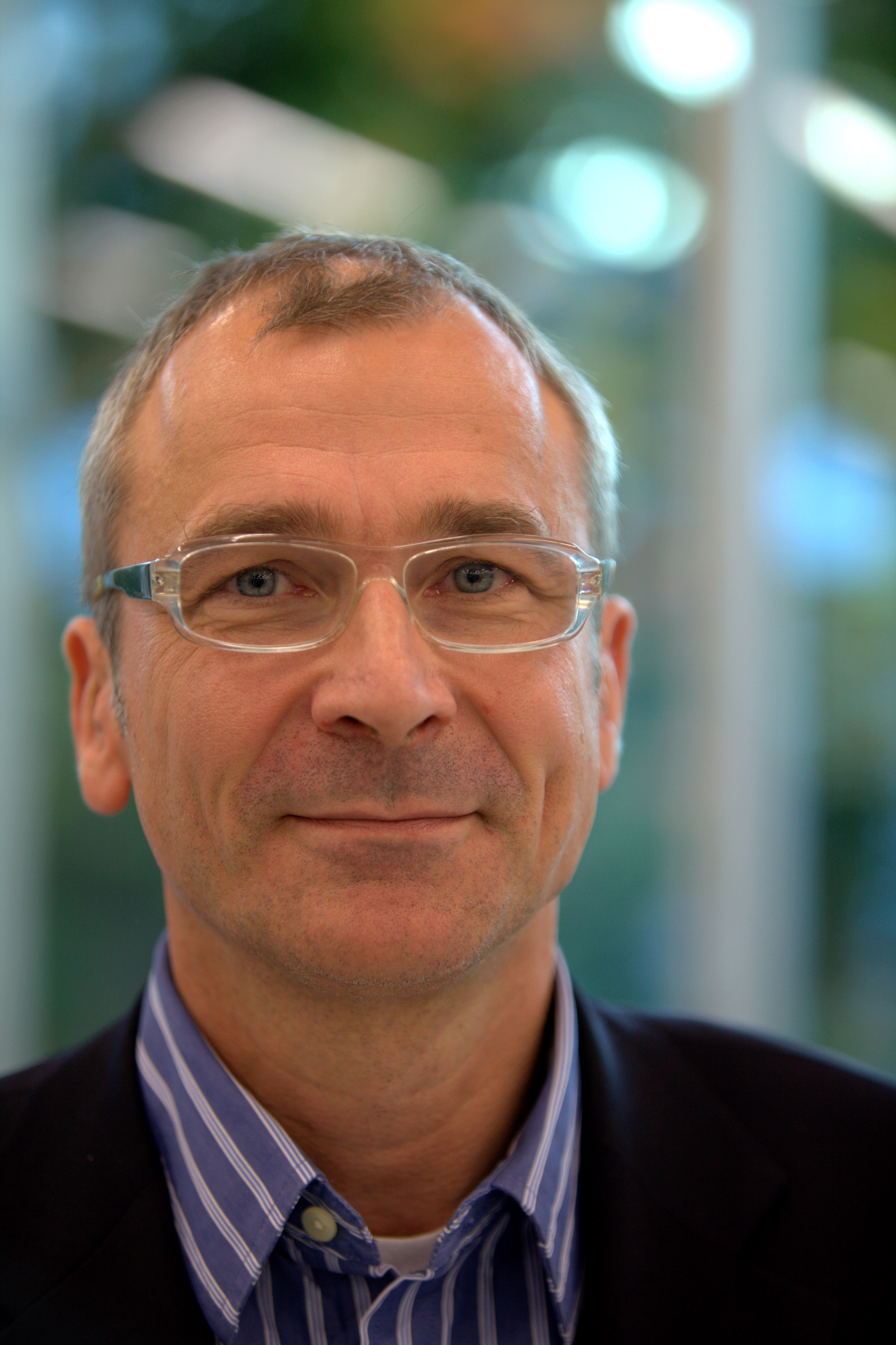
- Beck in 2010

Member of the Bundestag for North Rhine-Westphalia
- In office 10 November 1994 – 24 October 2017
- Constituency: Alliance 90/The Greens List

Personal details
- Born: 12 December 1960 (age 65) Stuttgart, West Germany
- Party: German: Alliance 90/The Greens; EU: The Greens–European Free Alliance
- Spouse: Adrian Petkov (2017–present)
- Domestic partner: Jacques Teyssier (2008–d. 2009)

Volker Beck (born 12 December 1960) is a German politician. From 1994 to 2017, he was a member of the Bundestag, the German federal parliament, for Alliance 90/The Greens. Beck served as the Green Speaker for Legal Affairs from 1994 to 2002, and as the Green Chief Whip in the Bundestag till 2013. He was also spokesperson for the Green Parliamentary Group for interior affairs and religion.

== Political career ==
Beck served as spokesman of the Association of Lesbians and Gays in Germany (Lesben- und Schwulenverband in Deutschland) LSVD for over ten years. He is a supporter of same-sex marriage and has been referred to as the "Father of the German Registered Partnership Act".

Beck served as spokesperson of the Greens' parliamentary group on legal affairs from 1994 to 2002, and as the Green Chief Whip in the Bundestag until 2013. He was also spokesperson for the Green Parliamentary Group for interior affairs and religion.

In a German Green leadership crisis he created the expression candystorm in support of Claudia Roth.

On his last day in session the Bundestag decided to vote on the gay marriage bill which Beck struggled for since 1989. On the last day of his parliamentary career, he received a standing ovation following the approval of same-sex marriage bill in the German Bundestag. Beck was credited as one of the most influential and important legislators campaigning for this in the German federal Parliament.

== Political positions ==
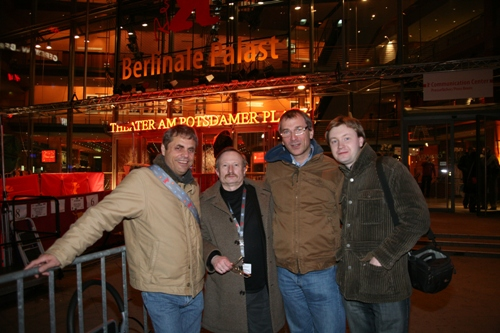
Jacques Teyssier (partner of Volker Beck), Vladimir Ivanov, Beck and Nikolai Alekseev at the Berlin Film Festival 2007

=== Human and gay rights activism ===
On 27 May 2006, Beck was attacked and injured during a gay rights demonstration in Moscow, called Moscow Pride. His attack as well as his participation at the Moscow Pride Festival is featured in the documentary Moscow Pride '06.

In May 2007, he was arrested and put in a bus in front of Moscow City Hall by the police. He had wanted to hand over a petition signed by several Members of Parliament at Moscow City Hall. He was attacked and had eggs thrown at his head. As in 2007, his partner Jacques Teyssier tried to protect Beck from attacks by anti gay rights protesters.

Alongside fellow MP Marieluise Beck, Volker Beck has been a vocal critic of Russia's human rights situation. During his time as his parliamentary group's spokesperson on human rights, he described the repeated prison sentences against Mikhail Khodorkovsky and Platon Lebedev as "disproportionate." He has often urged the German government and the European Union to make unequivocally clear to the Russian government that "the only Russia that can be a strategic partner is one that observes the rule of law." He also called on Western investors to "put an end to their opportunistic silence."

Beck spoke in favor of continuing European Union sanctions on Uzbekistan, originally instated after the Uzbek government did not allow an international investigation of the Andijan massacre, on 17 October 2006.

In June 2016, Beck was among 19 people detained by Turkish police central in Istanbul; the police had tried to disperse dozens of activists attempting to gather to mark the annual Istanbul Pride week after authorities banned their march.

=== Compensation for victims of Nazism ===
Beck is also considered an important figure in securing compensation for victims of Nazism. Alongside Otto Graf Lambsdorff, he negotiated the $4.6 billion fund to compensate people enslaved by the Nazis and later served as one of the trustees of the Foundation "Remembrance, Responsibility and Future". In 2008, he claimed that the German Parliament should raise more money to fight against right wing extremists. In 2015, he was awarded the Leo-Baeck-Award by the Central Council of Jews in Germany.

In 2013, Beck complained to R&S, the maker of condoms that were used in a far-right party's campaign against immigrant births. The company apologized and pledged to donate 10,000 condoms as well as the proceeds from the NPD order to a German foundation against right-wing extremism and anti-Semitism.

=== Foreign affairs ===
In 2015, following the agreement on a Joint Comprehensive Plan of Action with Iran, Beck criticized Vice Chancellor Sigmar Gabriel for calling the country a "friend" and argued that "with its position on Israel and its human rights situation this Iranian regime cannot be Germany's friend or strategic partner."

In October 2023, he wanted to stop the financial support for Palestinian authorities.

=== Sex with minors ===
In 2013, Beck received major media attention, when his 1988 essay: "Amending criminal law? An appeal for a realistic, new orientation of sexuality politics" which promoted the decriminalization of pedophilia, was released in full by Spiegel Online, showing that editorial changes had not altered the message of the essay as he had claimed. In response to the essay's initial discovery amidst revelations within the Green Party regarding members' prior involvement in the pedophilia movement, Beck distanced himself from his previous writing and mentioned that reports from German child care facilities combating child sexual abuse dramatically changed his position.

== Subsequent career ==
Since November 2017 Beck is lecturer at the Center for Studies in Religious Sciences (CERES) at the Ruhr University Bochum.

== Other activities ==
- Aktion Deutschland Hilft (Germany's Relief Coalition), Member of the Board of Trustees (since 2005)
- American Jewish Committee's Ramer Institute Berlin, Member of the Advisory Board (since 2002)
- Association of German Foundations, Member of the Parliamentary Advisory Board (since 2005)
- Foundation Flight, Expulsion, Reconciliation, Member of the Board of Trustees (since 1998)
- Center for Information and Documentation of Work Against Racism (IDA), Member of the Advisory Board
- German Coordinating-Council for Christian-Jewish Cooperation Organizations, Member of the Board of Trustees
- Foundation "Remembrance, Responsibility and Future", Member of the Board of Trustees
- Heinrich Heine University (HHU), Institut für Deutsches und Internationales Parteienrecht und Parteienforschung, Member of the Board of Trustees (since 2009)
- Hirschfeld Eddy Foundation, Member of the Board of Trustees (since 2005)
- Leo Baeck Foundation, Member of the Board of Trustees (since 2005)
- Magnus Hirschfeld Foundation, Member of the Board of Trustees (since 2009)
- Memorial to the Murdered Jews of Europe Foundation, Member of the Board of Trustees (since 1998)
- Société des amis du Louvre, Member
- Max Planck Institute for the Study of Societies (MPIfG), Member of the Board of Trustees (2002-2008)
- President of the German-Israeli Society.

== Personal life ==
Beck is openly gay. He lived in a long-term partnership with Jacques Teyssier until his death from cancer in Berlin on 25 July 2009. The couple had officially registered their partnership in 2008, after 16 years. Beck later entered into a relationship with architect Adrian Petkov, and after registering their partnership in the summer of 2017, the two married on the first day of legal same-sex marriage in Kreuzberg.

=== Possession of crystal meth ===
In March 2016, a police search based on reasonable suspicion that Beck had purchased and was in possession of a small amount (lowest classification under German narcotics law) of a controlled substance, lead to the seizure of 0.6 grams of an alleged drug. Reportedly, the substance found was crystal meth. Legal proceedings ended with a fine of €7,000 under the classification of "minimal guilt" in April 2016. In the aftermath, the Greens decided for him to remain their spokesperson for religious affairs and elected him to become spokesperson for immigration policy. Irene Mihalic replaced him as spokesperson for domestic policy.
