= Halina Bendkowski =

German politician and journalist (born 1949)

Halina Bendkowski (born 28 July 1949) is a German journalist, politician, and activist for feminism and the lesbian movement.

== Early life and education ==
Halina Bendkowski was born in Gliwice, Poland as the fourth child of a single mother. In 1956, the family moved to Oberhausen, Ruhr area, North Rhine-Westphalia (NRW). She lived at a Catholic boarding school for girls for two years, where she graduated from high school as an external student. She studied sociology, political science and philosophy at Münster. She completed her studies in 1978 with a master's degree.

== Career ==
In 1987, together with other women, she founded the FrauenfrAKTION as an umbrella organisation in Berlin to network women who worked in government or in administration and management with autonomous feminists, regardless of their party affiliation. From 1990 to 1991, Halina Bendkowski was a member of the Berlin House of Representatives. As an independent, she was elected on the Alliance 90/The Greens list, but then resigned.

In the early 1990s, in the context of the international campaign for women's and human rights, she developed the political-sociological approach of gender democracy, which further developed the concept of gender mainstreaming by providing for the participation of all groups. The first publication to bear this term in its title was a two-volume documentation published by the Austrian Federal Chancellery in 1993 on behalf of Johanna Dohnal: Test the West. Gender Democracy and Violence. The concept of gender democracy was adopted in a more general sense by the Heinrich Böll Foundation in the 1990s. The conception of this term was controversially discussed in numerous feminist discourses.

In 1999, Halina Bendkowski was one of the founding members of the Lesben- und Schwulenverband in Deutschland (LSVD, therefore it was organisation SVD since 1990), for which she was national spokesperson for four years. She is the initiator and theoretician of the Civil Partnership Act.

== Personal life ==
In August 2001, she was one of the first women in Berlin to enter into a civil partnership. With her long-term partner, the US-American theatre writer Lydia Stryk, she lives alternately in Berlin and New York City.

== Bibliography (selection) ==
- Sag niemand, dass du jüdisch bist. In: Viola Roggenkamp: Tu mir eine Liebe. My mum. Jewish women and men in Germany talk about their mothers. Mosse Verlag, Berlin 2002; Fischer Taschenbuch Verlag, Frankfurt am Main 2005, pp. 110–118.
- Der theatralisch verlassene Mann. In: Sonja Düring, Margret Hauch (Eds.): Heterosexuelle Verhältnisse (= Contributions to Sexual Research. Volume 71). Psychosozial-Verlag, Gießen 2000, ISBN 3-89806-051-9.
- Halina Bendkowski et al.: How far did the tomato fly? A '68 women's gala of reflection. Heinrich Böll Foundation, Berlin 1999, ISBN 3-927760-32-3.
- With Agnes Büchele, Erica Fischer, Ilse König: Geschlechterdemokratie und Gewalt. In: Test the West. Gender democracy and violence. Campaign of the Federal Minister for Women's Affairs 1992–1993. Concept and organisation: Halina Bendkowski, Vienna 1993, ISBN 3-901192-09-3.
- with Irene Rotalsky (ed.): Die alltägliche Wut. Violence, Pornography, Feminism (= Elefanten-Press 242 Bilder-Lese-Buch). Elefanten Press, Berlin 1987, ISBN 3-88520-242-5.
- with Brigitte Weisshaupt (ed.): Was Philosophinnen denken. Volume 1, Amann Verlag, Zurich 1983, ISBN 3-250-10012-9.

== Literature ==
- Werner Breunig, Andreas Herbst (Eds.): Biografisches Handbuch der Berliner Abgeordneten 1963–1995 und Stadtverordneten 1990/1991 (= Schriftenreihe des Landesarchivs Berlin. Volume 19). Landesarchiv Berlin, Berlin 2016, ISBN 978-3-9803303-5-0, p. 86.
