= LSVD+ =

German LGBTQ rights organisation

LSVD⁺ – Federation Queer Diversity
- LSVD⁺ – Verband Queere Vielfalt
- Formation: 18 February 1990
- Founder: Eduard Stapel
- Founded at: Leipzig, Germany
- Type: Nonprofit
- Legal status: Association
- Purpose: LGBTIQ rights and welfare
- Location: Berlin, Germany
- Key people: Klaus Jetz
- Website: lsvd.de
- Formerly called: SVD (Schwulenverband in der DDR/Gay Federation in GDR); LSVD (Lesbian and Gay Federation in Germany)

LSVD^{+} – Verband Queere Vielfalt (LSVD^{+}), German for the LSVD^{+} – Federation Queer Diversity, is the largest non-governmental LGBTQ rights organisation in Germany. It was founded in 1990 and is part of the International Lesbian, Gay, Bisexual, Trans and Intersex Association (ILGA World).

The organisation became known throughout Germany for its campaign for same-sex marriage in 1992. The LSVD^{+} has two main offices, one in Berlin and one in Cologne.

LSVD^{+} was formed as the Schwulenverband in der DDR (SVD) in 1990 and campaigned successfully to equal rights for a same-sex partnership. In March 2024, Lesben- und Schwulenverband in Deutschland (LSVD) changed its name to LSVD^{+} – Verband Queere Vielfalt (LSVD^{+}).

Manfred Bruns, Volker Beck, Eduard Stapel, Günter Dworek and Halina Bendkowski were prominent persons in the board of directors. People from the arts like Comic-Designer Ralf König, comedian Hella von Sinnen, director Rosa von Praunheim, from politics and from science like sexologist Rolf Gindorf and others are prominent individual members of the organisation.

== See also ==
- LGBTQ rights in Germany
- List of LGBTQ rights organisations
- Hirschfeld Eddy Foundation, a German Human Rights Foundation for LGBTIQ
