= Gender democracy =

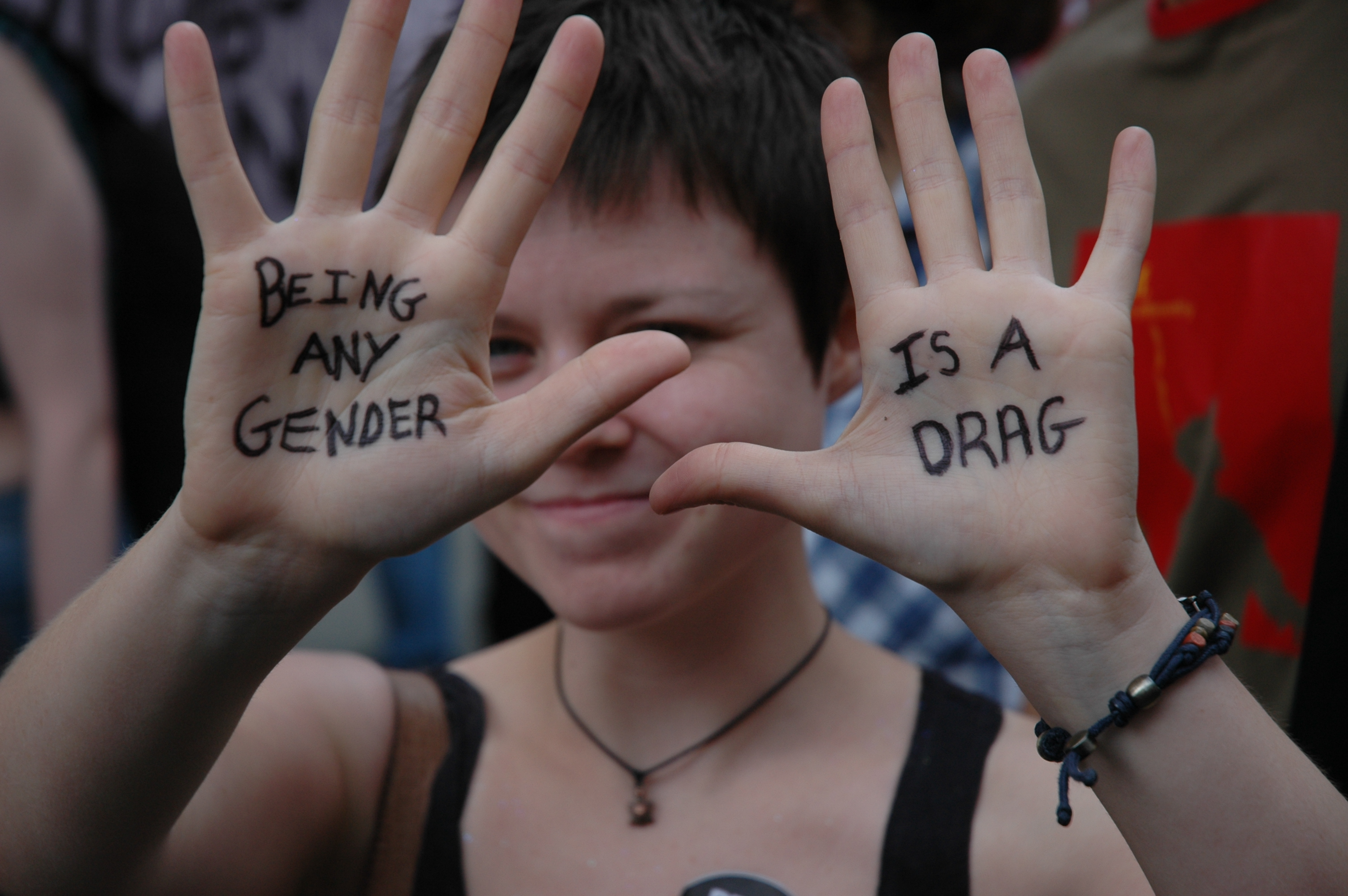
World Pride, London 2012

Gender democracy is a normative idea related to gender mainstreaming. Its aim is to achieve democratic conditions between men and women within society as a whole, as well as within companies, bureaucracies, and other organizations. Among other things, this is realized by means of gender trainings that raise awareness of existing inequalities and develop methods to democratize relations between genders. The term gender democracy was first coined and developed by German sociologist Halina Bedkowski.

== History of the term ==
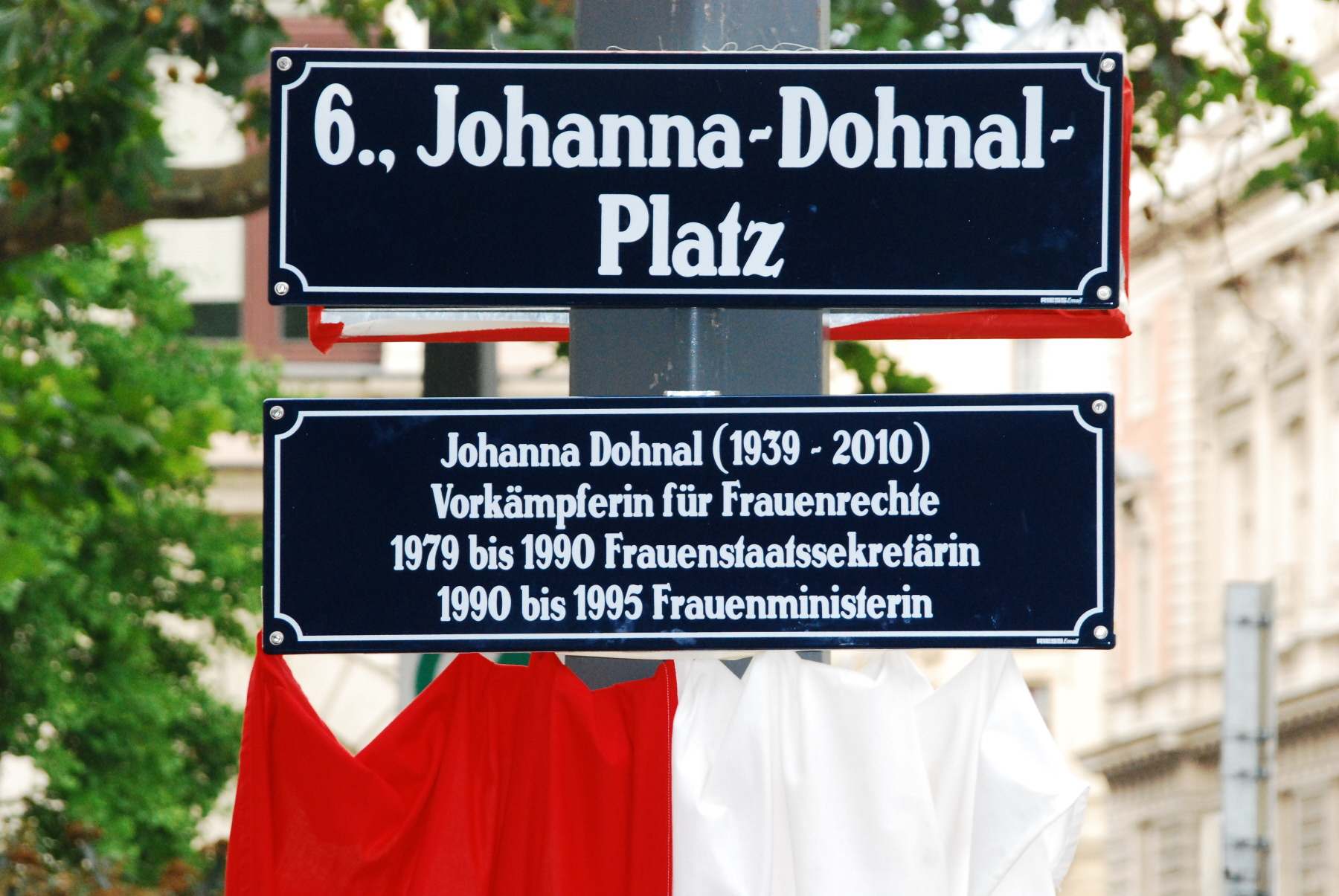
Street sign marking Vienna's Johanna-Dohnal-Platz. In 1993, the term "Geschlechterdemokratie" (gender democracy) appeared on the title of a publication edited by Johanna Dohnal - a first

According to Halina Bendkowski she developed the term and concept of gender democracy in the early 1990s during a "research trip to the US, which had been commissioned by Austria's Minister for Women, Johanna Dohal, with the aim of identifying innovative projects against domestic violence." Subsequently, in 1993, the term appeared on the title of a publication edited by the Austrian Federal Ministry of Education and Women's Affairs, "Test the West: Geschlechterdemokratie und Gewalt" (Test the West: Gender Democracy and Violence).

The pioneers of gender democracy refused to provide a fixed and static definition of the term. Bedkowski stated: "As soon as a term has been defined in a dictionary and recycled by other theorists, it will have lost most of its vitality. It is true, terms are alive - and this is especially true for terms that have been developed in the course of actual political conflicts." Gunda Werner, who in 1999 outlined the basic tenets of gender democracy for the Heinrich Böll Foundation, explained: "Gender democracy has no ready-made theoretical or practical precepts. It is an exploratory movement in search of new outlooks and models." Despite this, some of the fundamentals of gender democracy can be defined:

- Gender democracy is a normative precept, that is, an absolute moral and ethical postulate.
- Gender democracy posits that the principles of democracy should not be limited to the sphere of politics but equally apply to the workplace and to personal life.

== Goals and methods ==
Gender democracy aims to achieve the equal participation of women and men in politics, the corporate world, and in all parts of society by reforming and abolishing undemocratic structures and all forms of power that are based on oppression and violence. This approach is based on a broad definition of democracy - one that demands equal rights and opportunities for people in all their diversity. As there is a large number of gender identities, gender democracy rejects the male // female dichotomy, arguing instead that each human being - female, male, or otherwise - must have the right and the ability to self-determine their lifestyles, type of relationships in ways that go beyond stereotypical notions and any type of essentialism about men and women.

Gender democracy investigates and questions structures and contents of democratic systems that were developed by men in order to transform them in ways that provide for gender equality. A key tool for implementing gender democracy are the so-called "gender traings" that aim to question traditional gender roles, analyze the social framework, and develop methods that provide for greater gender equality within organizations.

== Gender democracy within organizations ==
The following are some examples for organizations that have made gender democracy part of their institutional structures:

- The statutes of the Heinrich Böll Foundation define gender democracy as a "joint task"
- The German trade union ver.di has defined the "realization of gender democracy" as one of its aims.
- The statutes of the German political party The Left contain a paragraph titled "gender democracy".

== Literature ==
=== English ===
- Cynthia Cockburn: Strategies for Gender Democracy. Strengthening the Representation of Trade Union Women in the European Social Dialogue, PDF, The European Journal of Women’s Studies, vol.3, 1996
- Yvonne Galligan (ed.): Deliberative Processes and Gender Democracy. Case Studies from Europe, PDF, February 2012, ARENA Report Series ISSN 1504-8152 / RECON Report Series ISSN 1504-7261
- Yvonne Galligan and Sara Clavero: Assessing Gender Democracy in the European Union. A Methodological Framework. RECON Online Working Paper 2008/16, PDF, September 2008, ISSN 1504-6907
- Utta Isop: Gender Grassroots Democracy. Five Demands for a Queer Politics, PDF

=== German ===
- Johanna Dohnal (ed.): Test the West: Geschlechterdemokratie und Gewalt (vol. 1 of "Gewalt gegen Frauen, Frauen gegen Gewalt"), Bundesministerin für Frauenangelegenheiten, Vienna 1993, ISBN 978-3-901-19209-8
- Heinrich-Böll-Stiftung (ed.): Geschlechterdemokratie wagen!, Königstein/Taunus, 2002.
- Heinrich-Böll-Stiftung: Schriften zur Geschlechterdemokratie (14 volumes)
- Walter Hollstein: Geschlechterdemokratie. Männer und Frauen: Besser miteinander leben. Wiesbaden 2004, ISBN 978-3-8100-3978-1
- Annette Jünemann: Geschlechterdemokratie für die Arabische Welt. Die EU-Förderpolitik zwischen Staatsfeminismus und Islamismus, Wiesbaden 2014, ISBN 978-3-658-04941-6
- Helga Lukoschat: Das Konzept der Geschlechterdemokratie und seine Umsetzung in Organisationen, in: Gleichstellungsstelle der Landeshauptstadt Stuttgart (ed.): Chancen und Risiken der Verwaltungsreform für Frauen, Stuttgart 1998, p. 6–13.
- Ministerium für Arbeit, Frauen, Gesundheit und Soziales: Gender Mainstreaming in Sachsen-Anhalt, Magdeburg 2001
- Birgit Sauer: Staat, Demokratie und Geschlecht – aktuelle Debatten. PDF, gender…politik…»online«, 2003.

== See also ==
- Gender
- Gender mainstreaming
