= Shitstorm =

Shitstorm is a vulgar dysphemism for a chaotic and unpleasant situation. The term may also refer to:

- Shitstorm, a band on the Robotic Empire record label
- "Shitstorm", a song by Murder Squad from their 2003 album Ravenous, Murderous
- "Shitstorm", a song by the band Casey Jones from their 2006 album The Messenger
- "Shitstorm", a song by Strapping Young Lad from their 2005 album Alien
