= Hildegard Maria Nickel =

German sociologist

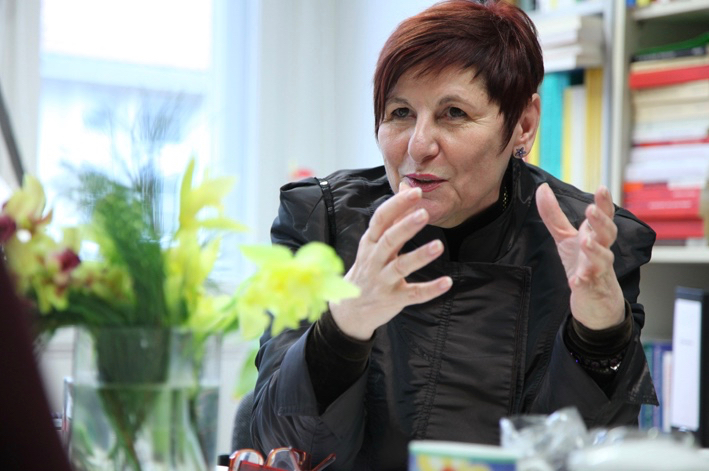
Hildegard Maria Nickel (2011)

Hildegard Maria Nickel (born 1948) is a German sociologist and feminist who has specialized in the sociology of work and gender studies. From 1977, she was attached to the East-German Academy of Pedagogical Sciences becoming a full professor at the Institute for Social Sciences at Humboldt University, Berlin, from 1992 until her retirement in 2014. In 1994, she received the Helge Pross Prize from the University of Siegen for her contributions to family and gender studies. From 2002 to 2008, Nickel was State Secretary for Economy, Labour and Women at the Senate of Berlin.

== Biography ==
Born in 1948 in Berlin, Hildegard Maria Nickel graduated in cultural studies at Humboldt University in 1973. In 1977, she earned a Ph.D. with a dissertation titled Zu theoretischen Grundfragen der marzistisch-leninistischen Familiensoziologie (Fundamental questions in Marxist–Leninist sociology of the family). This was followed in 1986 by the habilitation dissertation Geschlechtersozialisation in der Familie und als Funktion gesellschaftlicher Arbeitsteilung: ein erziehungssoziologischer Ansats für die Heraubilding männlicher und weiblicher sozialer Identität (Gender socialization in the family and as a function of the social division of labor: An education sociology approach to explaining the formulation for female and male social identity), earning her a second doctorate: Dr. sc. phil.

After being employed by the East-German Academy of Pedagogical Sciences in 1977, from 1992 to 2014, Nickel was a full professor at the Sociology Department of the Humboldt University where she was involved in social and behavioural sciences, specializing in gender studies, sociology of work, and industrial and organizational sociology. In parallel, from 1993 to 2002 she was director of the university's Zentrum für interdisziplinäre Frauenforschung (Centre for Interdisciplinary Women's Studies).

Nickel has undertaken visiting professorships in Canada, England, Pakistan, South Korea, and the United States. From 2002 to 2008, she served on the Berlin Senate as State Secretary for Economy, Labour and Women.

== Awards ==
In 1995, Nickel was awarded the Helge Pross Prize for outstanding achievements in the field of sociology of the family and gender studies.
