= Hirschfeld Eddy Foundation =

German LGBT human rights foundation

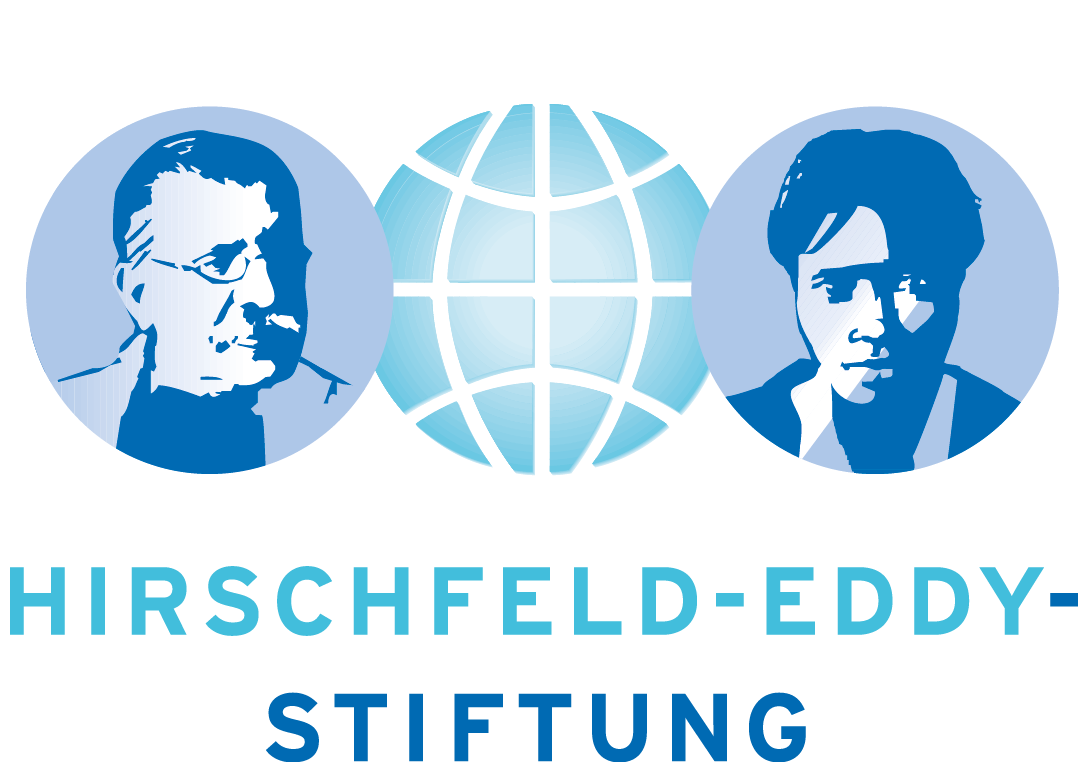
Logo of foundation

The Hirschfeld-Eddy Foundation (German: Hirschfeld-Eddy-Stiftung, HES) was founded in Berlin in June 2007. HES is the human rights foundation of LSVD^{+}. The foundation focusses on human rights of lesbian, gay, bisexual, transgender, intersex and other queer (LGBTIQ) people.

== Name origin ==
The Foundation's name remembers two personalities who are important for the worldwide struggle for the Human Rights of gay people: Dr Magnus Hirschfeld (1868–1935), after the German physician, sexologist, sexual reformer and civil rights activist and FannyAnn Eddy (1974–2004), the prominent lesbian human rights activist from Sierra Leone, who was murdered in 2004.

== Background ==
The initiative came from the Lesbian and Gay Federation in Germany (LSVD), today LSVD^{+} – Association Queer Diversity. LSVD^{+} is one of three queer organisations which was formally granted consultative status at the United Nations in 2006 and is giving organizational support for the Foundation.

== Aims, idea and concept ==
The purpose of the foundation is "to foster respect for the human rights of lesbians, gays, bisexuals and transgender people, contribute to international human rights advocacy, provide active support to human rights defenders, promote awareness-raising and dismantle prejudices."

The combination of the names of the "founding father of the gay rights movement in Germany" and the modern-day "human rights activist" and Martyr from Africa reflects that the struggle for the human rights of lesbians, gays, bisexuals and transgender people began in Europe but is now being waged in every continent of the world.

Human rights for LGBTIQ people is a global issue which concerns universal principles. "The work which began in 1897 with Magnus Hirschfeld, who established the world's first homosexual rights organization, is now being carried forward by countless people on every continent – often at great personal risk. The Hirschfeld-Eddy Foundation also aims to raise awareness of, and counteract, this threat to human rights advocates through international publicity campaigns. The name of FannyAnn Eddy symbolizes this brave dangerous struggle against oppression which often puts the lives of those involved at risk."

== Founding council members ==
- Boris Balanetkii, Executive Director of Information Center GenderDoc-M, Moldova;
- Gloria Careaga Pérez, El Closet de Sor Juana, Mexico and Latin American board member, (ILGA), Faculty of Psychology in the National Autonomous University of Mexico (UNAM);
- Rosanna Flamer-Caldera, Executive Director, Equal Ground, Sri Lanka and Co-Secretary General, ILGA;
- Muhsin Hendricks, The Inner Circle, South Africa, first openly gay imam;
- Joey Matale, ANZAPI (Aotearoa/New Zealand, Australia and Pacific Islands ) board member, ILGA, Tonga Leiti’s Association;
- Juliet Victor Mukasa, SMUG (Sexual Minorities Uganda);
- Dede Oetomo, Founder and Trustee of GAYa NUSANTARA, Indonesia;
- Arsham Parsi, Executive Director, IRQR Iranian Railroad for Queer Refugees;
- Carlos Perera, Equal Ground Pasifik, Fiji;
- Belissa Andía Pérez, Instituto Runa, Peru, Trans Secretariat, ILGA;
- Toni Reis, President of ABGLT (Associação Brasileira de Gays, Lésbicas e Transgêneros - Brazilian LGBT federation).

== See also ==
- LGBT rights in Germany
- List of LGBT rights organisations
