= House of Poschinger =

Bavarian noble family

Poschinger
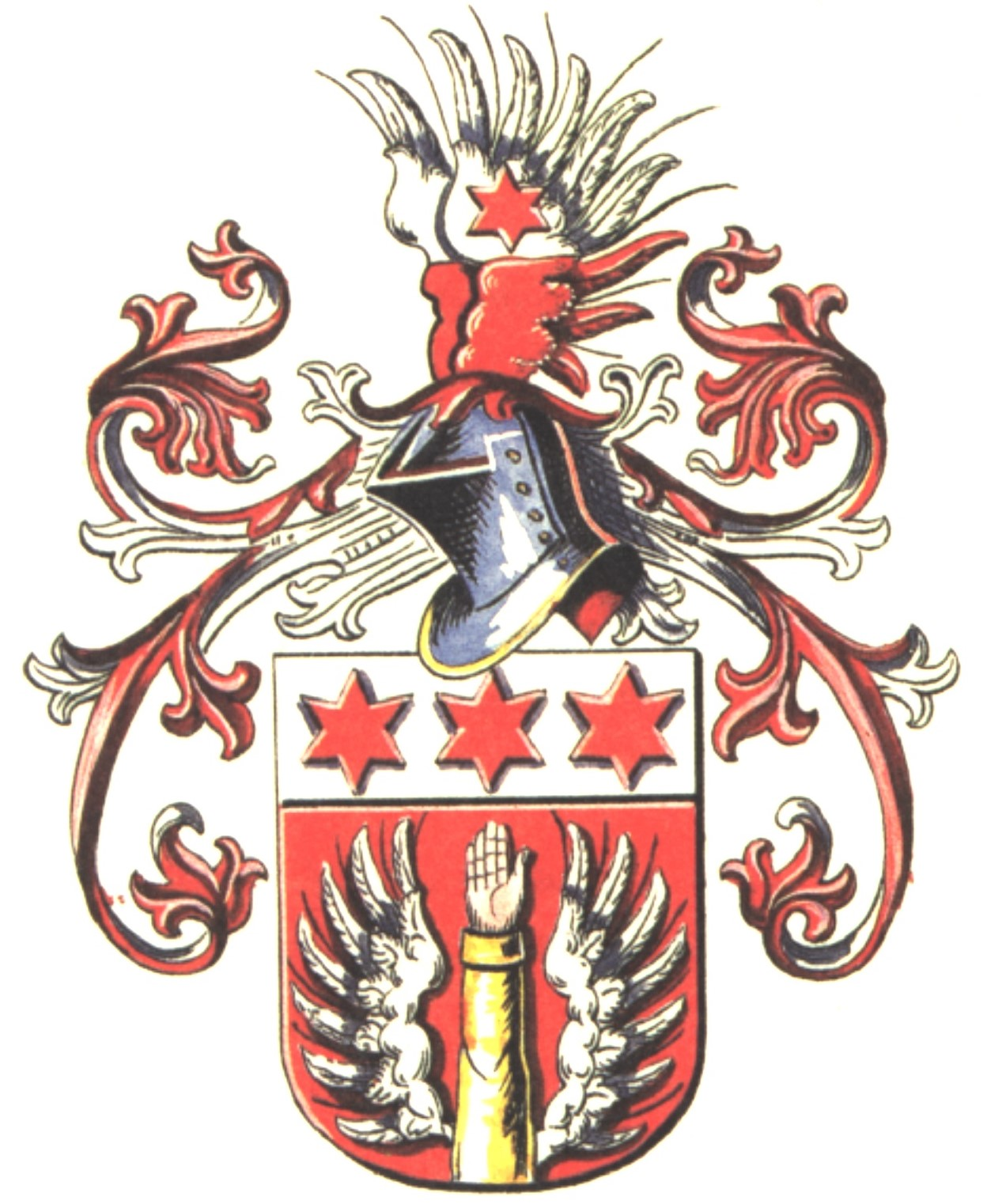
- Coat of Arms - House of Poschinger
- Country: Holy Roman Empire; Kingdom of Bavaria
- Earlier spellings: Paskengen; Paschingen; Baskingin; Posching
- Origin: Posching
- Founded: 1140; 886 years ago
- Founder: Rapoto de Paskengen
- Seat: Frauenau
- Titles: Baron; Knight; Edler; Landsass
- Style: Hochwohlgeboren
- Branches: Baron Poschinger of Frauenau; Baron of Poschinger-Bray; Knight of Poschinger (in Oberanzenberg); Knight of Poschinger-Camphausen

The House of Poschinger is an ancient Bavarian noble family. Its origins date back to the year 1140. The family received the rank of Knights of the Holy Roman Empire. The Frauenau branch rose to the rank of Barons (Freiherr) in the Kingdom of Bavaria and held a hereditary seat in the House of Councillors.

== History ==
The first documented branch of the House of Poschinger worked as ministeriales for the Prince-Bishops of Passau. Records of the family begin with Rapoto de Paskengen mentioned in 1140 as a witness of a donation to the Augustinian monastery of Aldersbach. Further branches existed in Posching (in the areas around Mitterfels, Metten, Deggendorf and later also in Pförring near Ingolstadt), at the estate of Sicklasberg near Konzell and as councillors in Straubing. The name Poschinger (often spelled Paskengen, Paschingen, Baskingin or Posching) originated probably from the Posching estate, which was owned by the bishops of Passau.

The genealogical lineage of the family has continued uninterrupted since its inception and began with Joachim Poschinger from Pförring (1523-1599). Joachim Poschinger is considered to be a member of the Posching branch, which originated around 1262. After studying law and music at the University of Ingolstadt, he was a judge and administrator (Pfleger) in the service of the Barons of Degenberg at the castles of Linden near Viechtach and Neunußberg (1550-1568). In 1568, he bought the glassworks estate of Zwieselau (district of Regen) in the Bavarian Forest from the House of Degenberg. This marks the beginning of the Poschinger tradition as owners of glassworks, which continues to this day. Joachim received his imperial coat of arms on October 19, 1547 in Regensburg from Petrus Apianus, imperial count palatine under Emperor Charles V. His son Paulus acquired the glassworks estate of Oberfrauenau in the Bavarian Forest in 1592, from this time on the seat of the progenitor branch.

One branch of the family emigrated to Bohemia in the 17th century. In 1639 Hans Poschinger (d. 1676) settled among the royal free peasants of the crown forest of Hwozd and built the Poschingerhof at Seewiesen (Javorná). His son Andreas Anton Poschinger (1646–1716) owned glassworks there and served as chief judge (Oberrichter) of the free peasants from 1693 to 1712. In 1700 he endowed the chapel from which the church of St Anne at Seewiesen developed. After the estate passed to a son-in-law in 1716, no further Poschinger is recorded there.

Due to the possession of Oberanzenberg (since 1639) Wilhelm Poschinger received the noble title Landsass in Upper Palatinate on December 18, 1643 by Prince Elector Maximilian. From this time on, the family was part of the nobility in Upper Palatinate and was listed in the registers of the noble Landsassen.

After Johann Michael I. Poschinger had already acquired the estates of Drachselsried and Wettzell in 1770, his son Georg Benedikt I. submitted a request to the Court Chamber of the Elector in 1784 to elevate the hereditary estate of Frauenau to the status of an independent feudal estate (Hofmark), which was granted on December 7, 1785. Georg Benedikt I. thus had the lower jurisdiction, police authority and certain administrative rights on all three estates.

The family received the hereditary imperial knighthood with the name Knight and Edler of Poschinger in Oberanzenberg for the following brothers:

- Dr. jur. utr. Johann Martin, Electoral Bavarian Court Advocate and Administrator of the Prince Elector (Pfleger). Later, he was a member of the Electoral Court Chamber Council of Palatinate and Bavaria, Royal Brewery Administrator and Director of the Bavarian Court Brewery Office (1798-1817) in Munich
  (Progenitor of the discontinued Munich-Mannheim branch)
- Joseph Anton, Tradesman in Passau
  (Progenitor of the Berg branch, including Poschinger-Camphausen)
- Georg Benedikt I, Lord of the estates Oberfrauenau, Drachselsried, Wettzell, Neunußberg and Oberanzenberg
  (Progenitor of the Frauenau branch from which, among other branches, the baronial house originated)
- Ignaz Dominikus, Priest

The titles were granted on 17 September 1790 in Munich by the acting Imperial Vicar, Elector Charles Theodore of Bavaria. The matriculation in the Kingdom of Bavaria in the knight class took place on 30 January 1810 for Joseph Anton and on 30 June 1810 for his brothers Johann Martin and Georg Benedikt.

In 1873, Georg Benedikt II. Knight of Poschinger, Lord of the Estate of Frauenau (Oberfrauenau) and others, was appointed hereditary Imperial Councillor (Reichsrat) of Bavaria. In accordance with the order of succession, the entail passed on to his brother Eduard Ferdinand after the death of Georg Benedikt. The latter ceded it to his son Eduard Georg Benedikt in 1901, who was appointed as a member of the House of Councillors on 1 November 1901. Eduard Ferdinand Ritter von Poschinger was promoted to hereditary Bavarian Baron on 24 July 1901 in Munich by Prince Regent Luitpold of Bavaria with immatriculation in the Kingdom of Bavaria in the baronial class on 28 August 1901 with the extension of the name to Baron Poschinger of Frauenau.

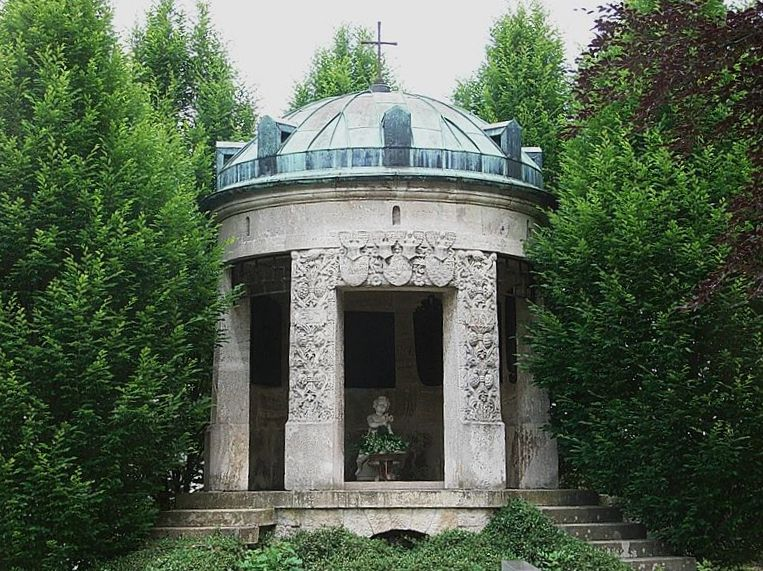
Poschinger Mausoleum in Frauenau

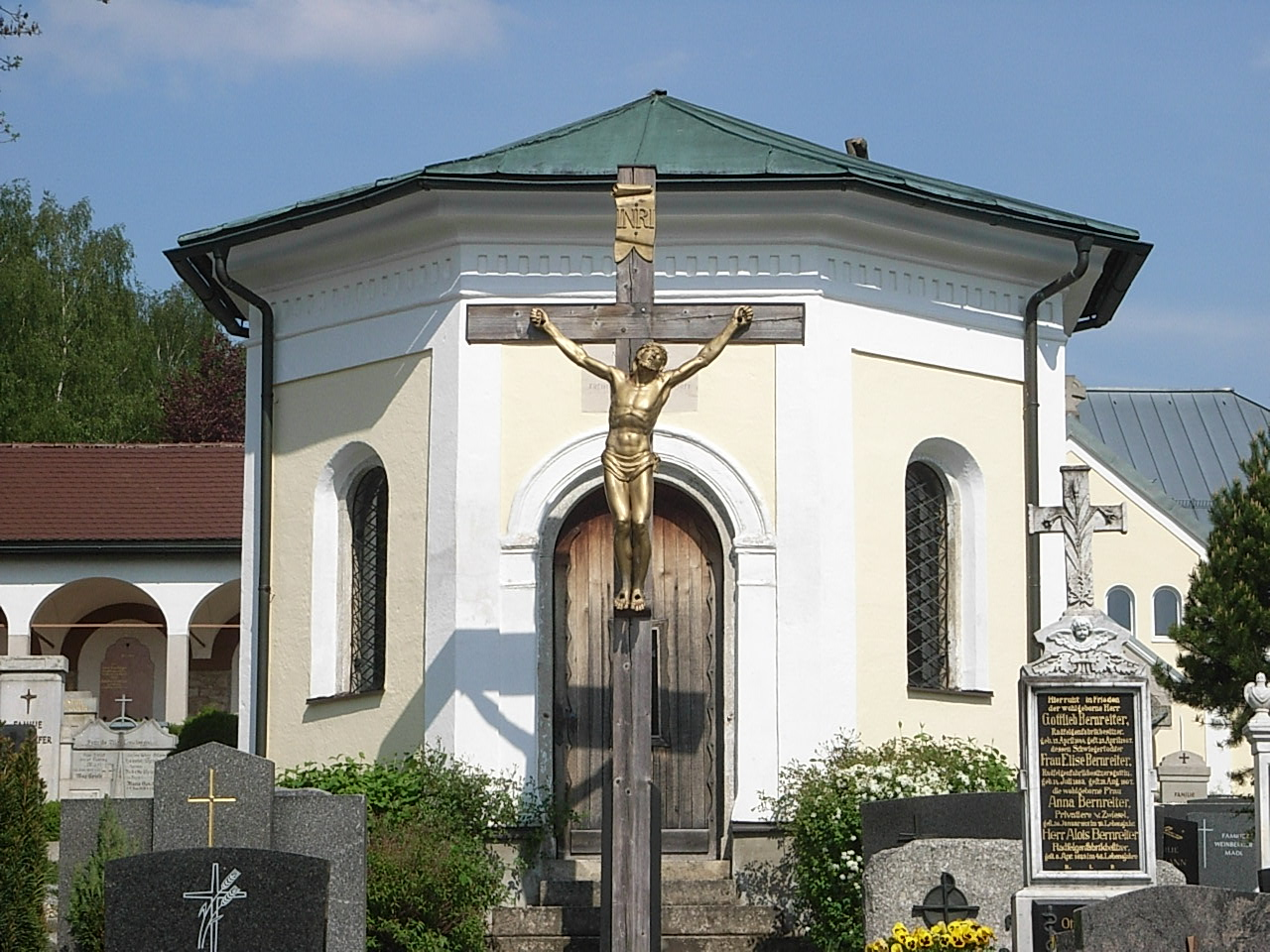
Poschinger Mausoleum in Zwiesel

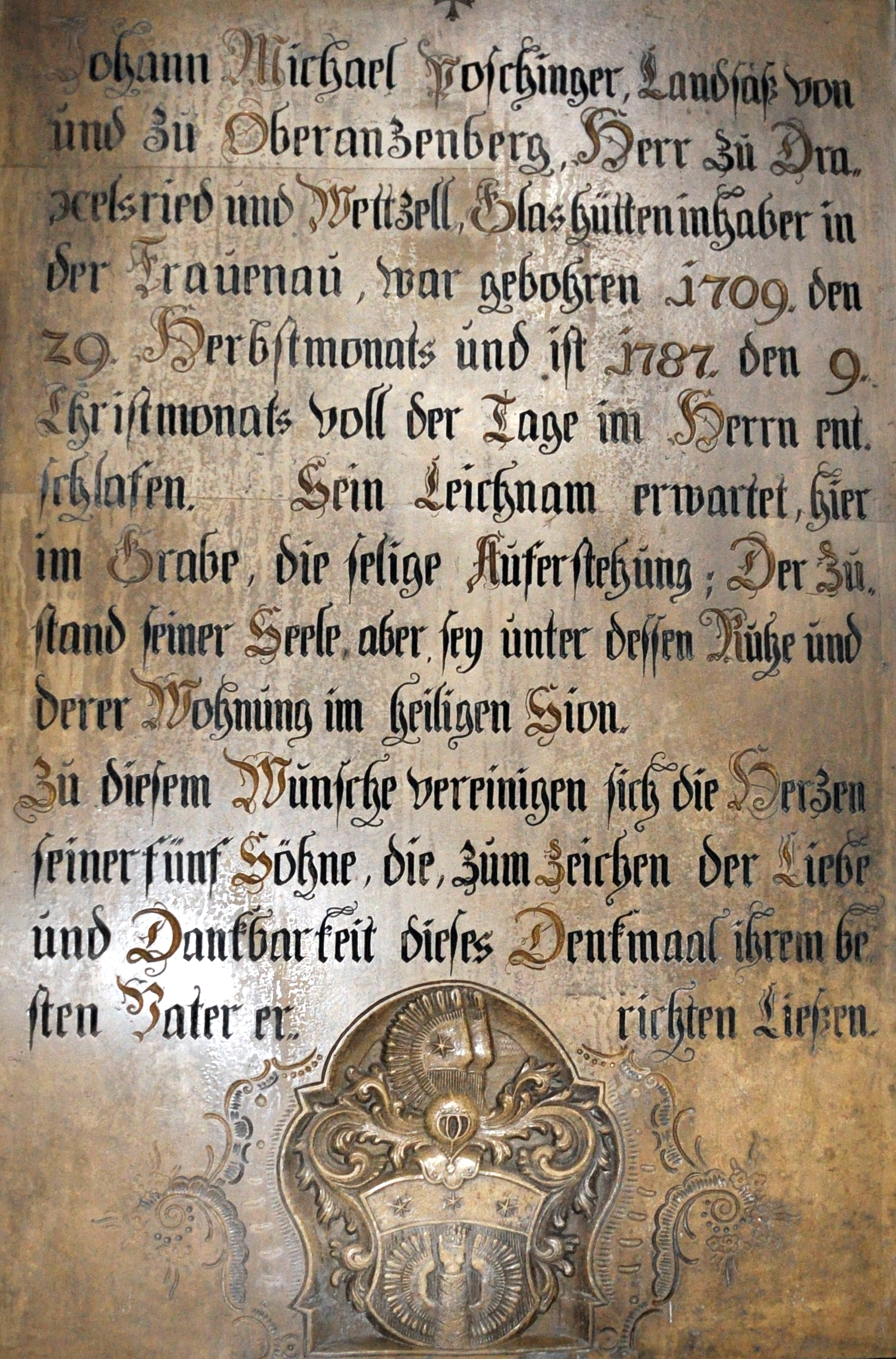
Gravestone of Johann Michael I. Poschinger in Mariä Himmelfahrt (Frauenau)

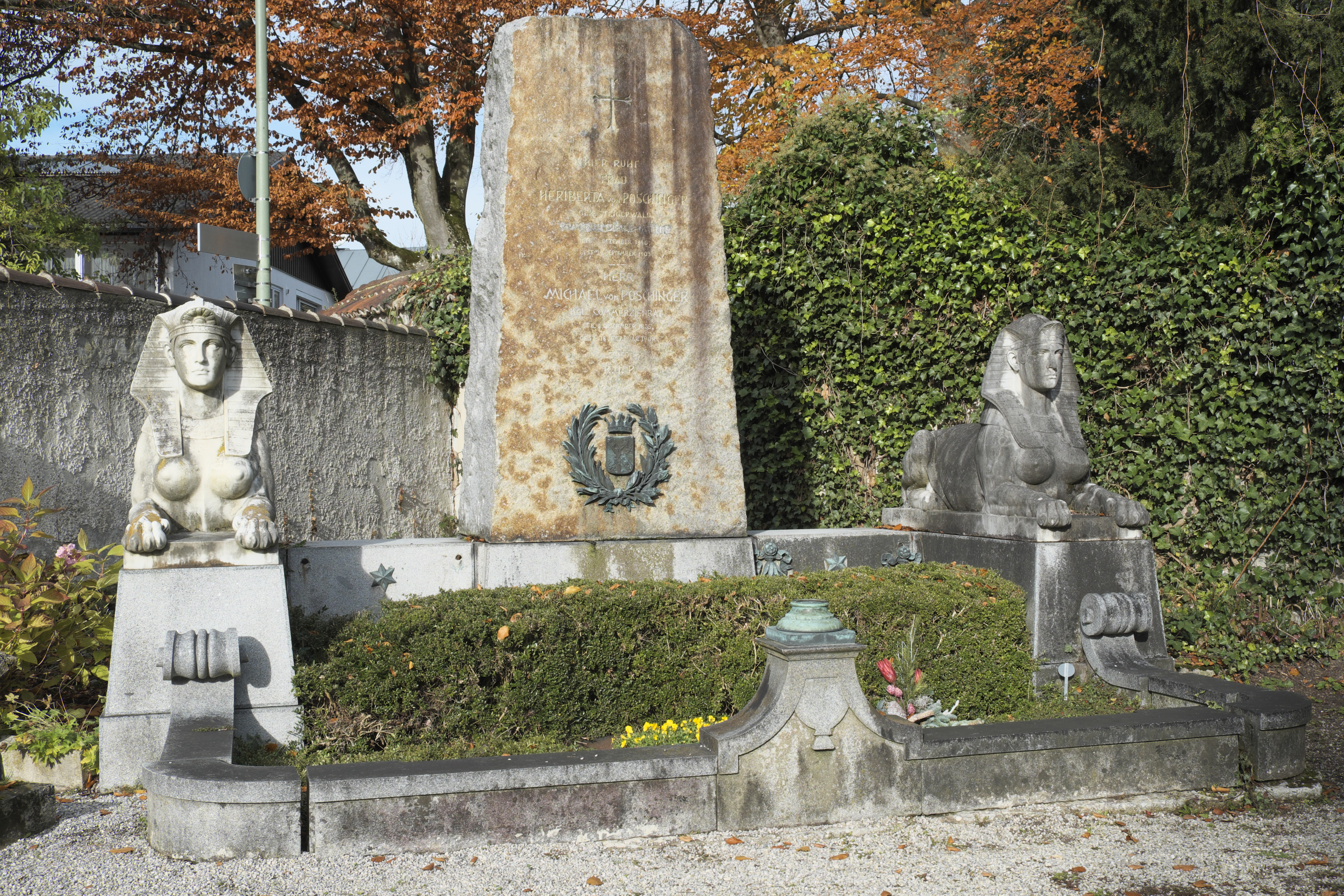
Poschinger Grave in Tutzing

On April 6, 1908, the Royal Bavarian Chamberlain and Rittmaster Ottmar Knight of Poschinger, lord of the manor on Riegsee and others, who had married Gerda Camphausen, daughter of the banker and Royal Prussian Privy Councillor of Commerce Arthur Camphausen, in 1906, received permission to merge his name with that of the Camphausen family as Knight of Poschinger-Camphausen.

In 1899, Johann Michael III. Knight and Edler of Poschinger and his wife Heriberta donated Ismaning Palace and the Ismaning estate, together with the estates of Zengermoos and Karlshof, to the city of Munich as a charitable foundation. The deed of foundation survives in the Munich city archives; the city subsequently managed the three estates through its Office of Agriculture and Forestry. The palace remained in municipal ownership until 1919, when it passed to the municipality of Ismaning; it has housed the town hall since 1934.

The decision of the District President on May 21, 1953 in Regensburg to change the name to Baron of Poschinger-Bray for Adalbert Baron Poschinger of Frauenau, who was married to Anna Maria, heiress of the extinct Counts of Bray-Steinburg, was not objected to by the German Nobility Law Committee (ARA) in Marburg on September 15, 1990.

The family is among the oldest industrial dynasties in Germany and produced glass in the Bavarian Forest for four and a half centuries. While most other glassmaking families of the region became extinct or gave up their holdings, the Poschingers remained glassworks proprietors. Around 1900 the works at the Oberzwieselau and Buchenau estates in particular gained supraregional importance for their coloured sheet glass and Art Nouveau vases; artists working for them included Hans Christiansen, Richard Riemerschmid, Julius Diez and Karl Schmoll von Eisenwerth. The Poschinger glassworks at Frauenau was latterly regarded as the oldest glass manufactory in Germany and the oldest in continuous family ownership worldwide. Production ceased on 30 November 2021.

== Estates ==
=== Seats of the early medieval branches ===
The following seats and manorial estates with lower jurisdiction (Hofmark) are recorded for the early branches attributed to the family. The years indicate documentary mention, not the duration of ownership:

- Päschinger Au, a noble seat near Kellberg outside Passau, seat of the oldest branch, which is documented from 1140 to 1280, sold in 1419 to Prince-Bishop Georg von Hohenlohe
- The Hofmark of Hauzenberg, recorded in 1346 for Ulrich Poschinger
- Hundsrück near Passau, recorded in 1512 and 1542 for Stephan Poschinger and his presumed son of the same name
- The Bühel at Posching near Mitterfels, seat of the branch documented from 1262 to 1338
- Aschenau near Mitterfels, recorded in 1280 and 1310 for Philipp Posching
- The Hofmark of Lindenau near Viechtach, recorded in 1346 for Konrad Poschinger
- Sicklasberg (Sykleinsberg, Sikkelsberg) near Konzell, held over several generations from 1399 to 1489 and passing to the Vorster family through the marriage of Achaz Poschinger's sister Benigna
- The estate and Hofmark of Zeidlarn, also called Niederhartzeitldorn (today Unterzeitldorn), near Straubing, acquired in 1434 by Simon Poschinger of the Straubing councillor family from Erasmus (Asam) von Puchberg and sold in 1463 by his son Lorenz to the abbot of Windberg Abbey

=== Estates since the 16th century ===
The following estates and residences belong or have belonged to the house of Poschinger since the 16th century

- Oberfrauenau
- Unter- and Oberzwieselau
- Buchenau
- Oberanzenberg near Kemnath
- Neunußberg
- Wettzell
- Drachselsried
- Thalersdorf
- Irlbach
- Steinburg
- Schambach
- Poschinger Palace in Munich (Brienner Street)
- Riegsee near Murnau (Neuegling Castle)
- Ismaning (Ismaning Palace )
- Zengermoos near Munich
- Karlshof near Munich
- Theresienthal
- Aufhausen near Landau a.d.Isar
- Pullach near Bad Aibling
- Rabenstein
- Unterbreitenau near Bischofsmais
- Villa Poschinger in Starnberg
- Korczyn and Kruszelnica estates, Skole district, Galicia (today Korchyn and Krushelnytsia, Ukraine)
- Poschingerhof at Seewiesen (today Poschingrův Dvůr, Javorná, Czech Republic)
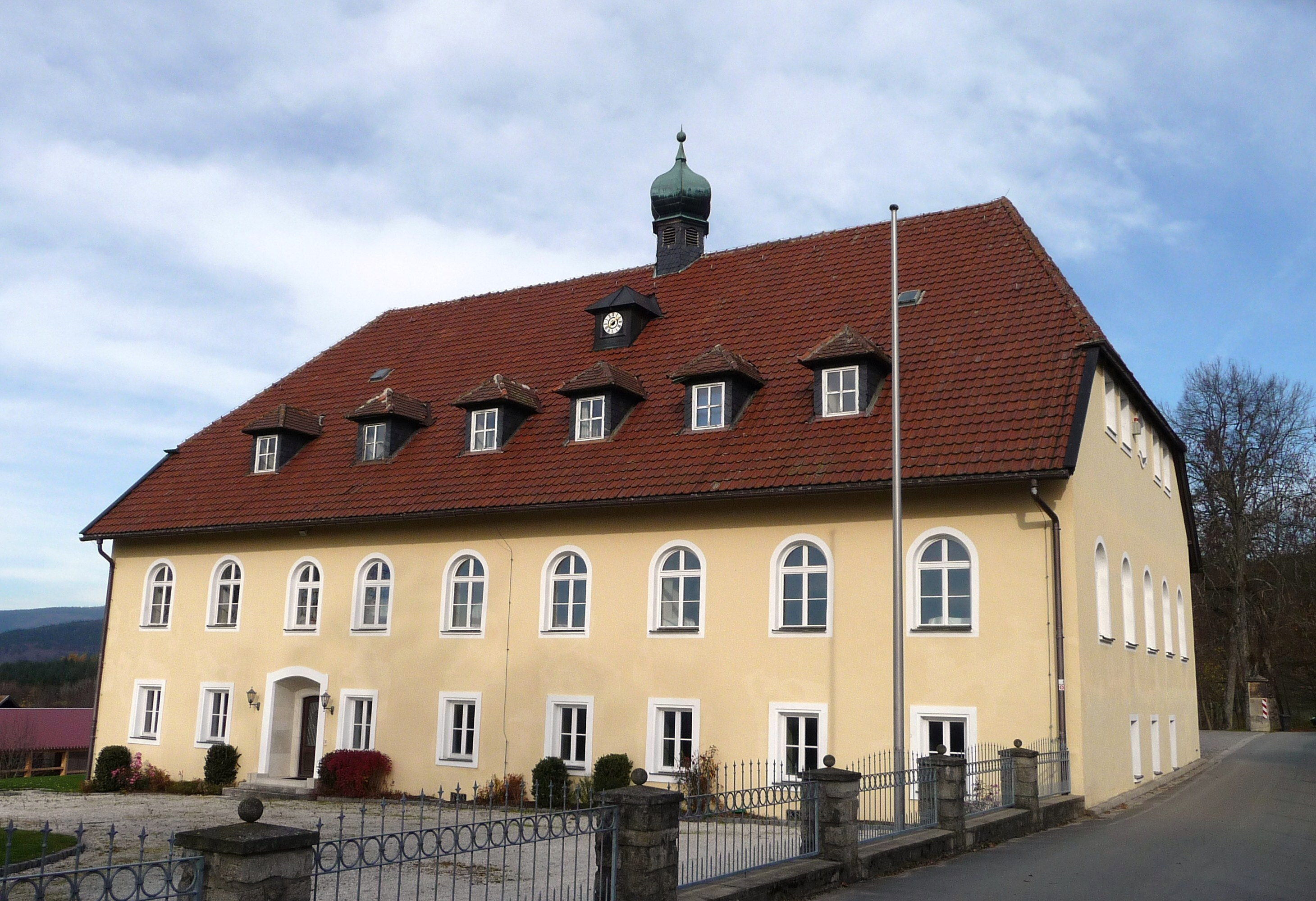
Mansion in Oberfrauenau

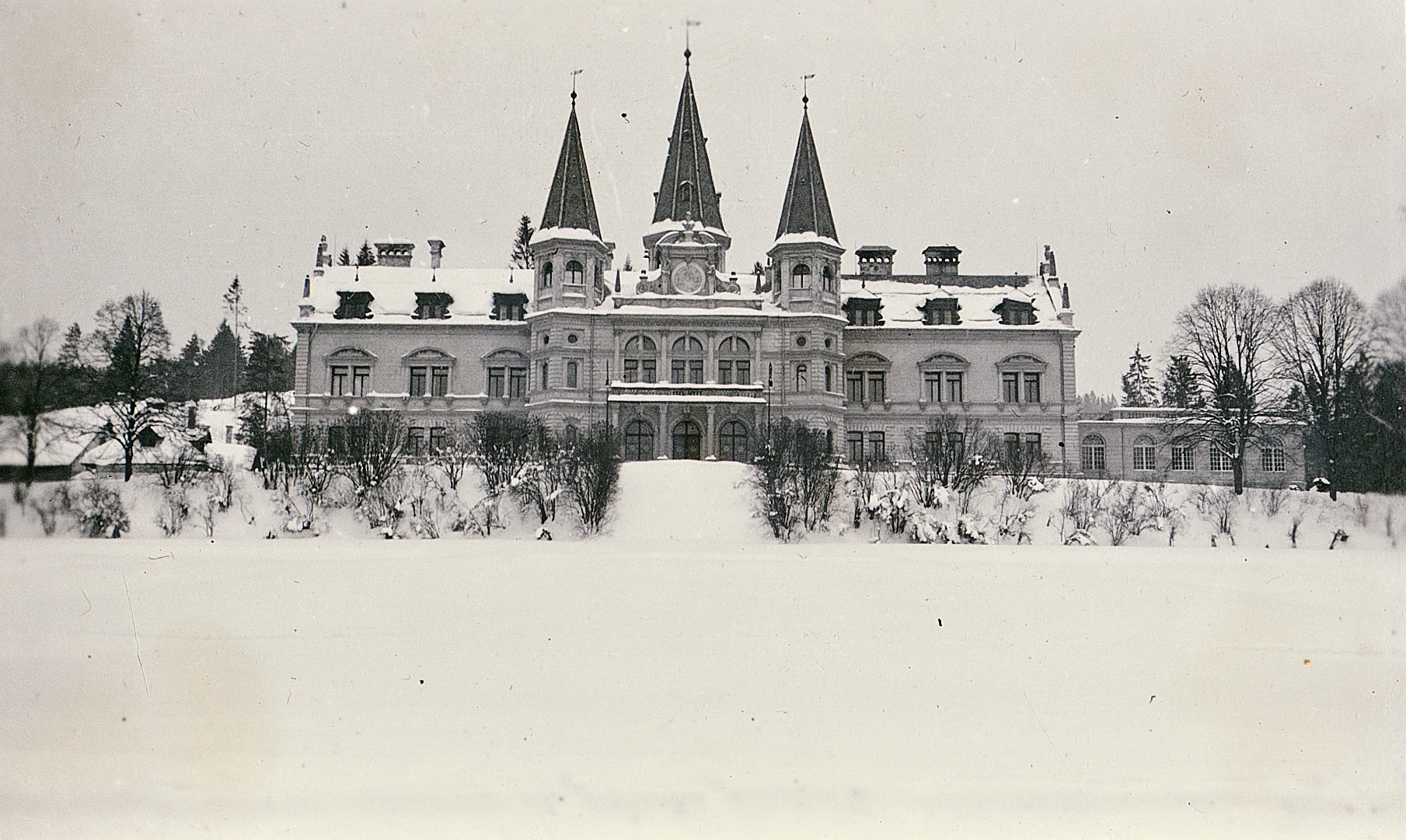
Oberfrauenau Castle

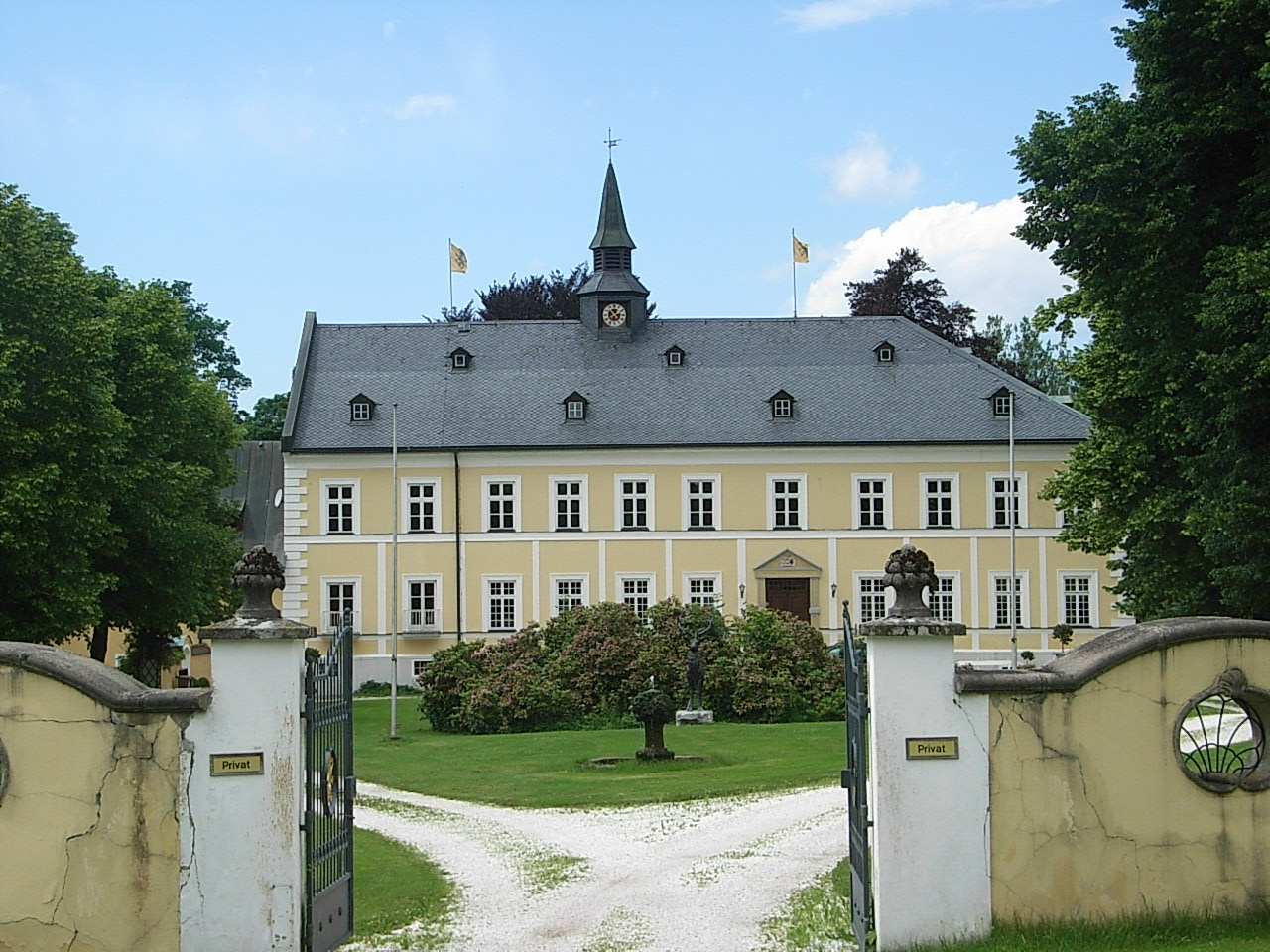
Oberzwieselau Castle

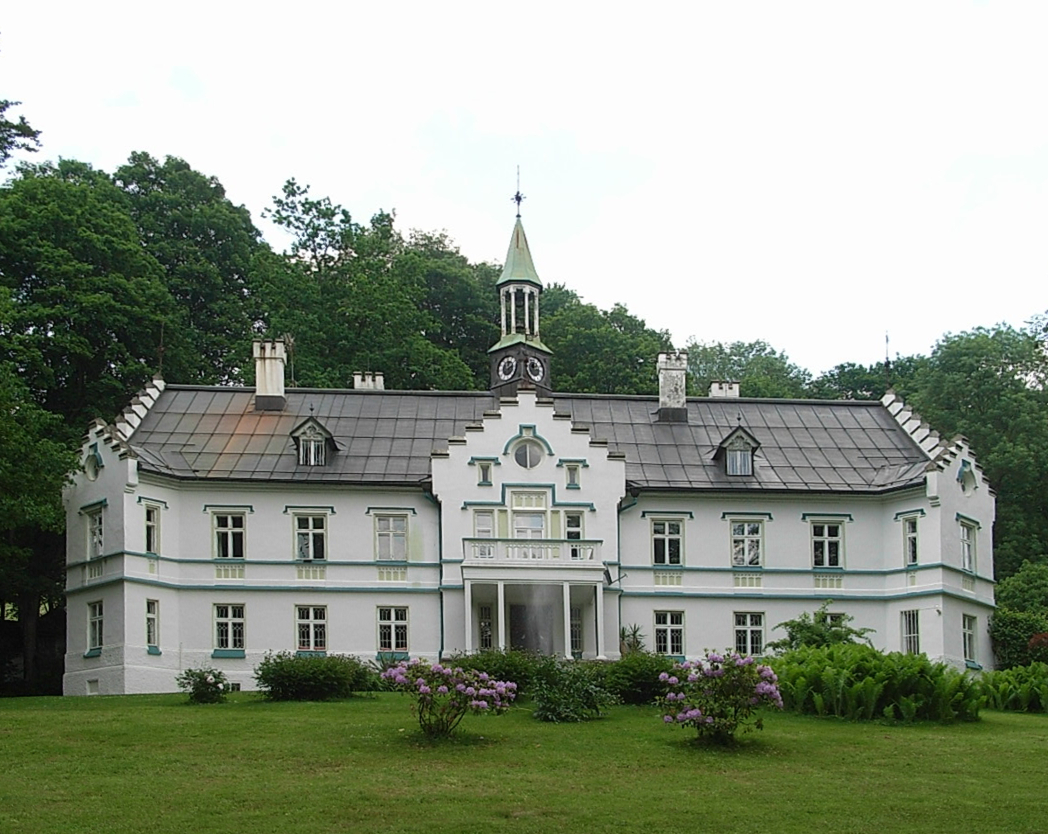
Buchenau Castle

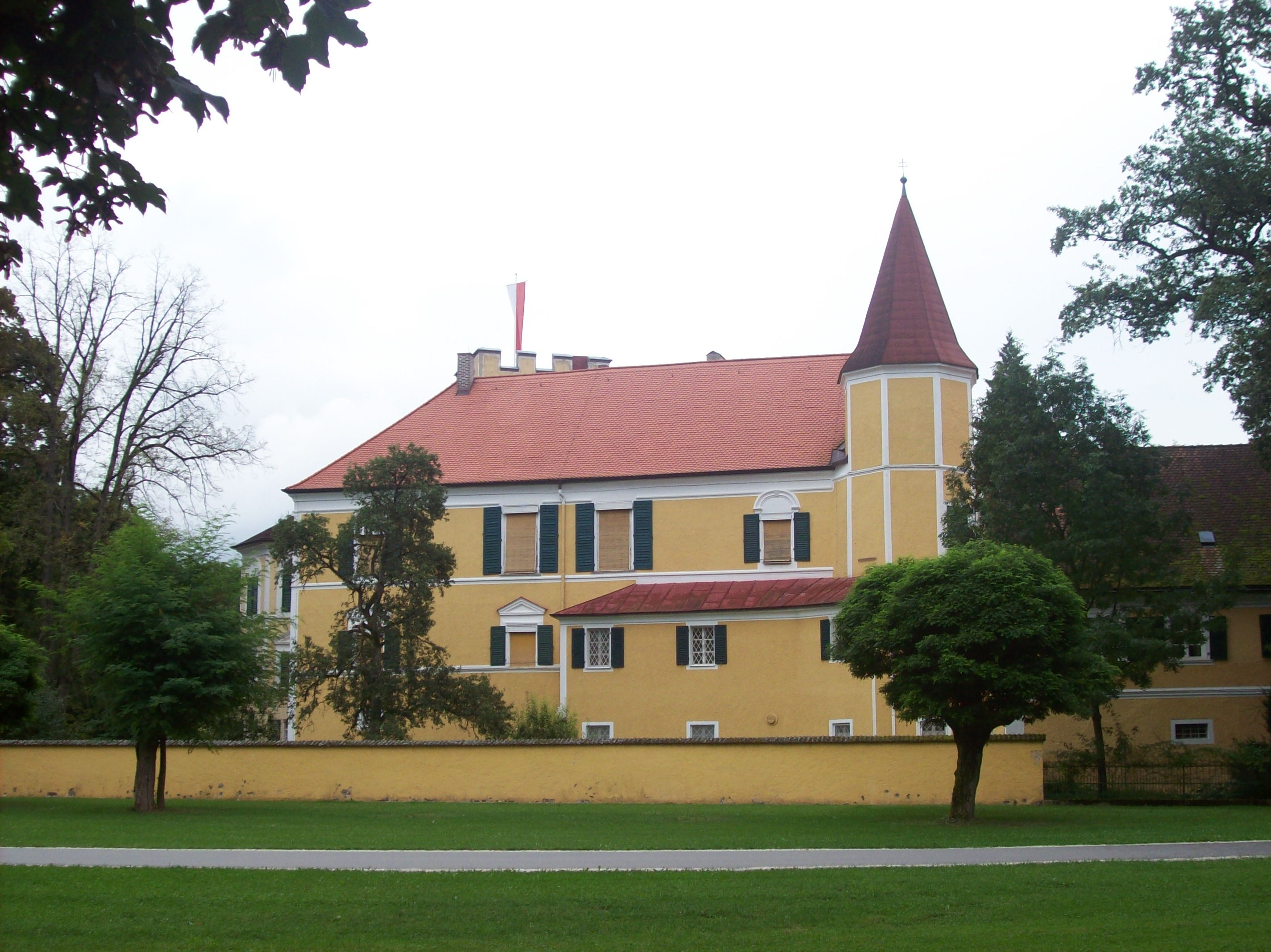
Irlbach Castle

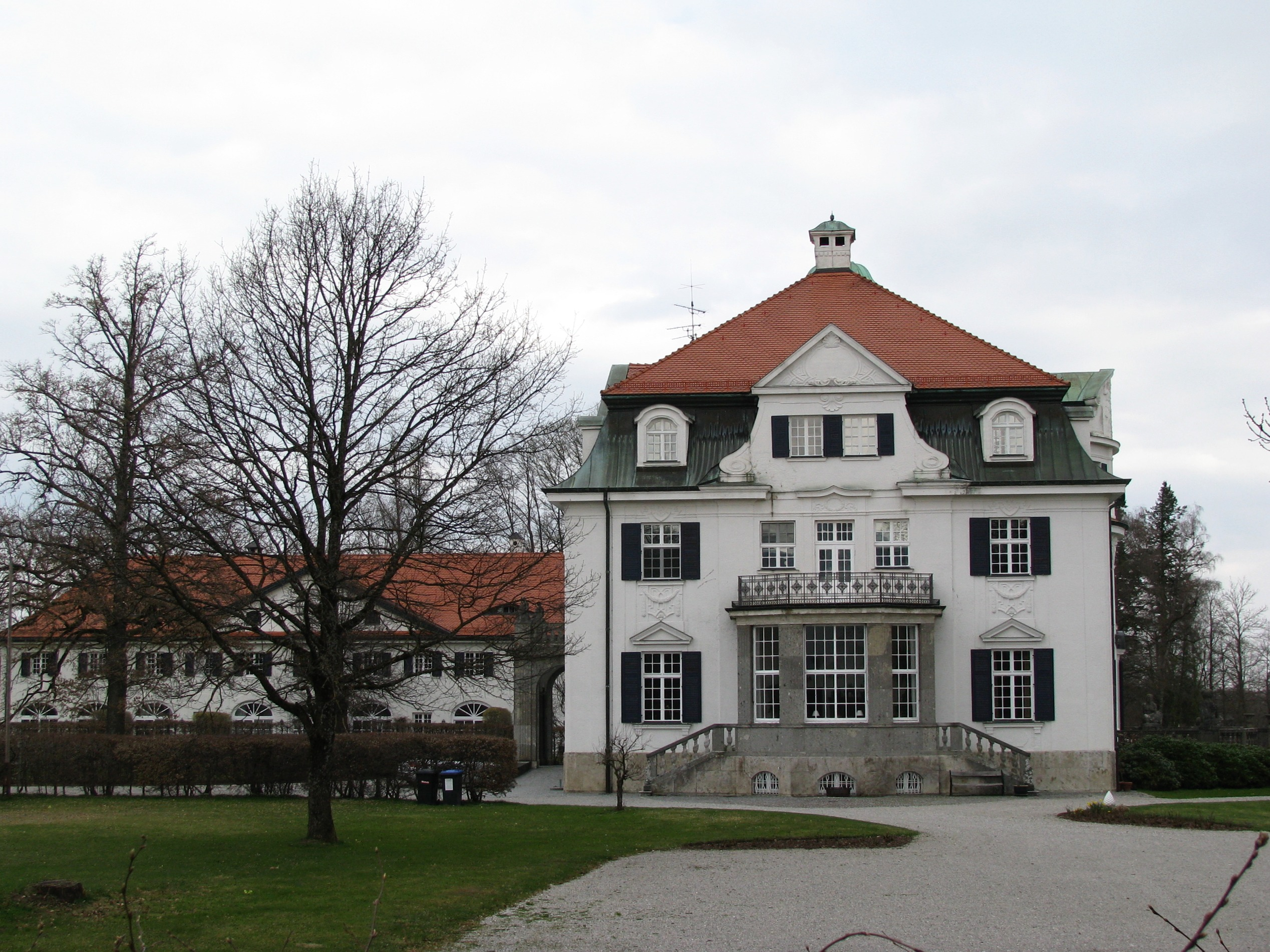
Neuegling Castle

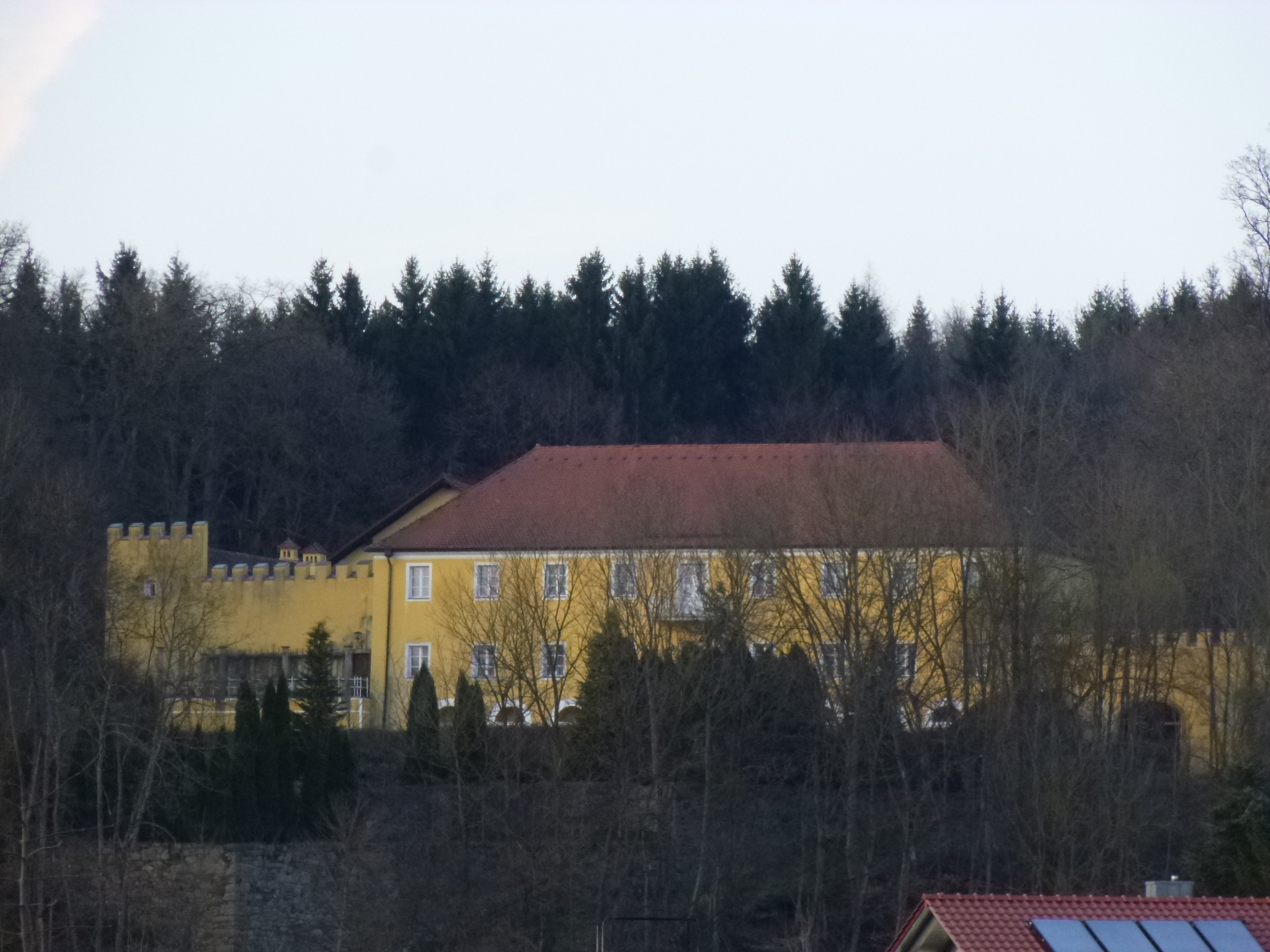
Steinburg Castle

== Coat of arms ==
The family's original arms, granted in 1547, are divided so that the upper third is argent, charged with three stars gules, and the lower portion gules, charged with an arm vested or—the hand raised as if taking an oath—issuing two swan's wings argent. The crest, on a helmet with mantling gules and argent, is a flight (a pair of wings) per fess argent and gules, the argent half charged with a star gules.

The arms granted in the 1790 diploma are quartered: in the 1st and 4th, azure a bend argent charged with three stars gules; in the 2nd and 3rd, gules a lion or facing inward. On the helmet, with mantling azure and argent to the dexter and gules and or to the sinister, the lion issuant between an open flight azure, each wing charged on its outer side with the bend.

The baronial arms of 1901 are quartered as in 1790 and charged with an inescutcheon gules bearing, from the original arms, a dexter arm vested or and winged argent, the hand open. The achievement has two helmets: to the dexter, with mantling gules and argent, a closed flight per fess argent and gules, the argent half charged with a star gules; to the sinister, with mantling azure and or, as in 1790.

The Barons of Poschinger-Bray bear a new combined coat of arms incorporating elements of both the Counts of Bray-Steinburg and the Barons Poschinger of Frauenau. Its adoption was not objected to by the German Nobility Law Committee (Deutscher Adelsrechtsausschuss) in Marburg on 22 June 2009.

Coats of arms of the House of Poschinger

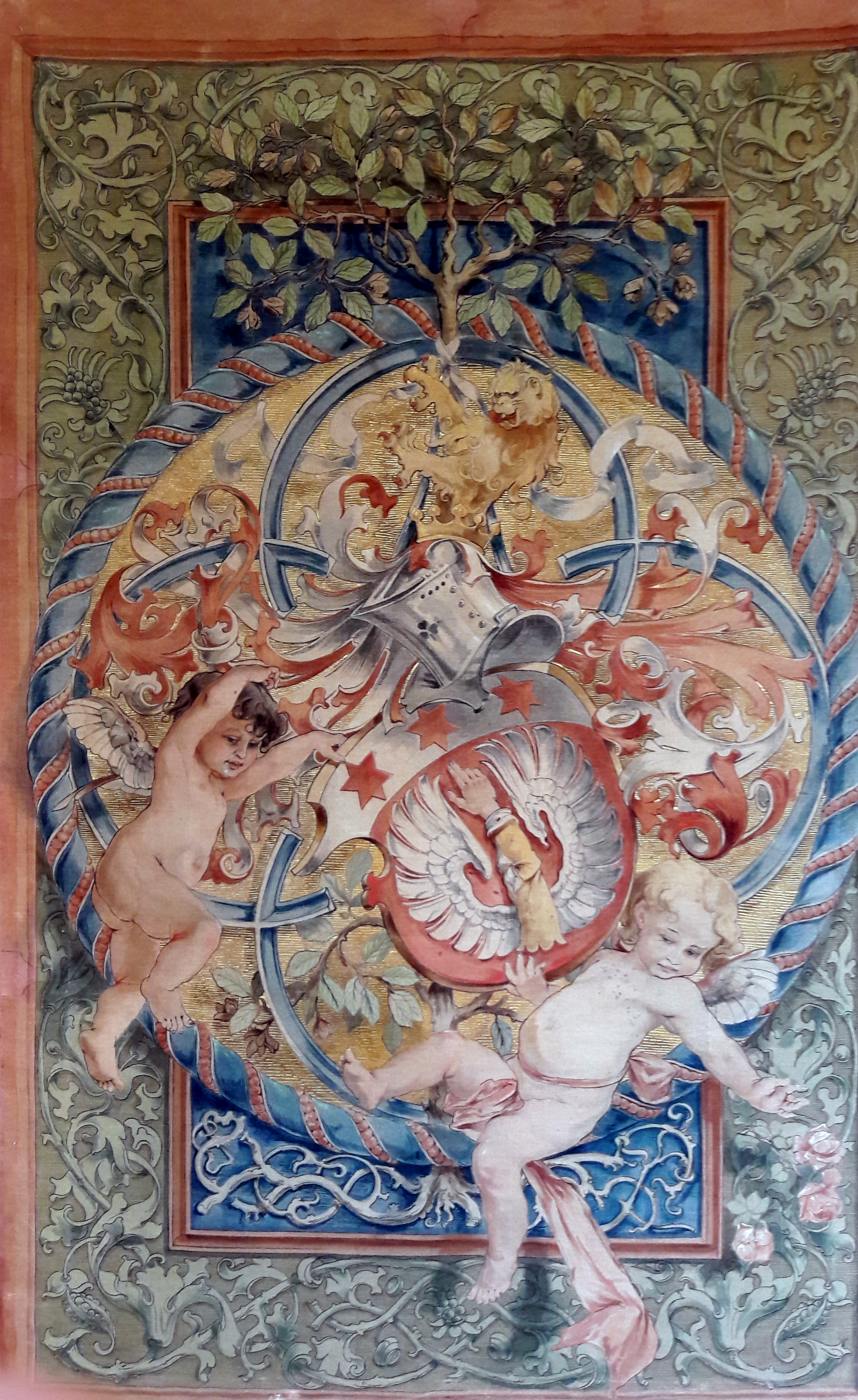
Variant of the original arms (1547)

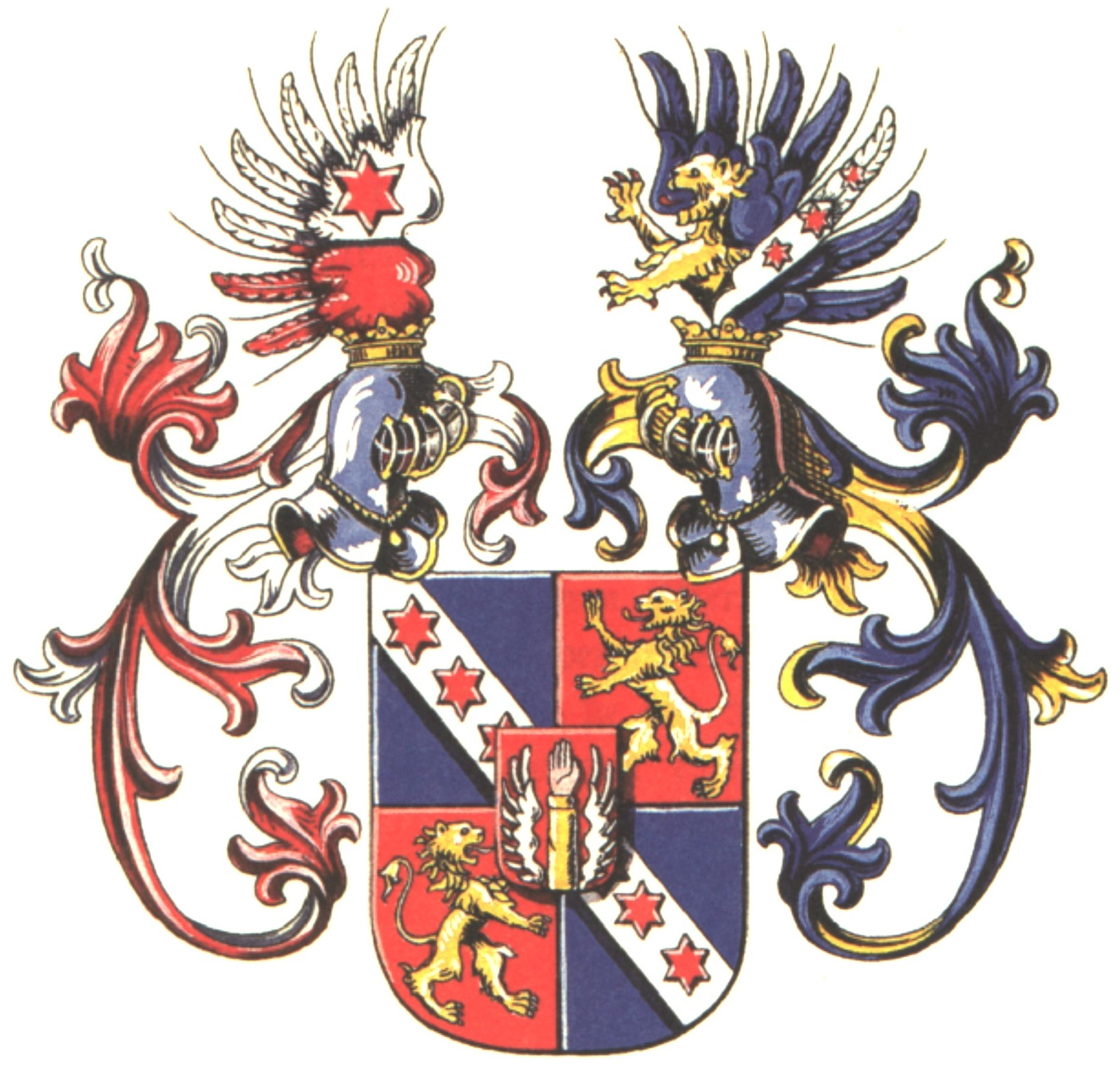
Arms of the Barons Poschinger of Frauenau (1901)

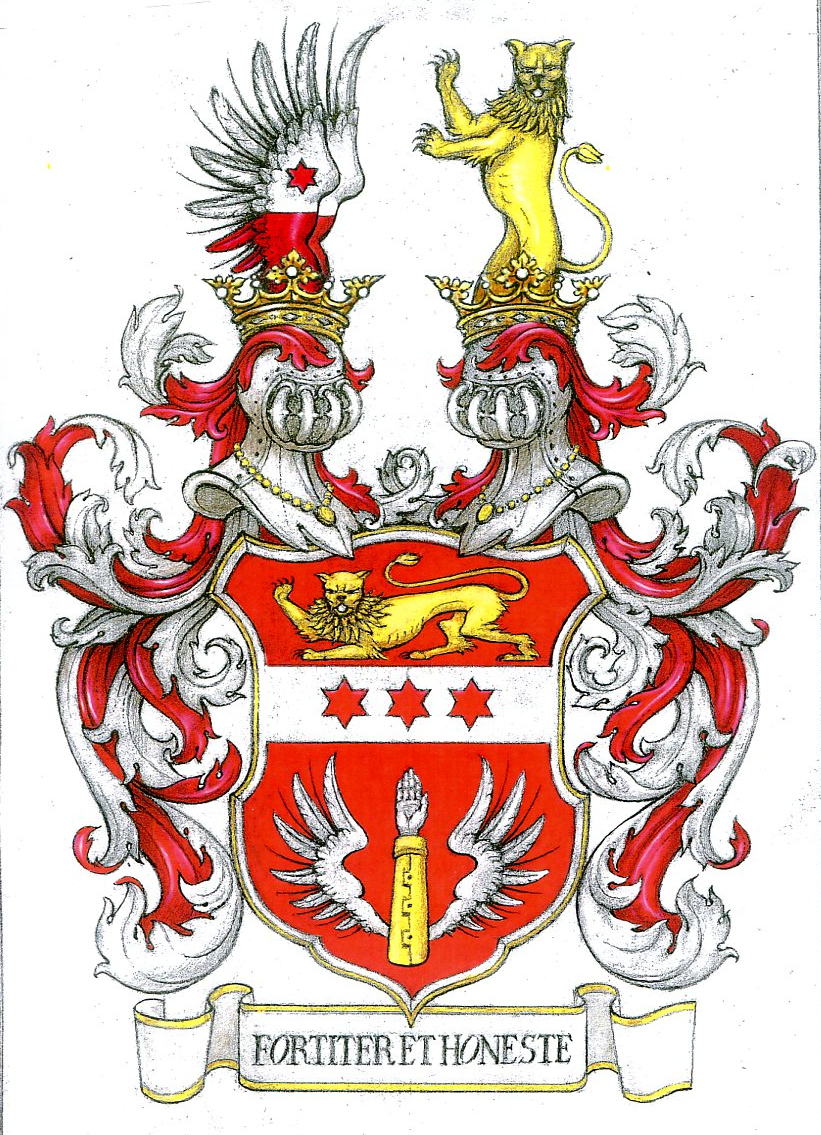
Arms of the Barons of Poschinger-Bray (2009)

== Prominent Members of the Family ==
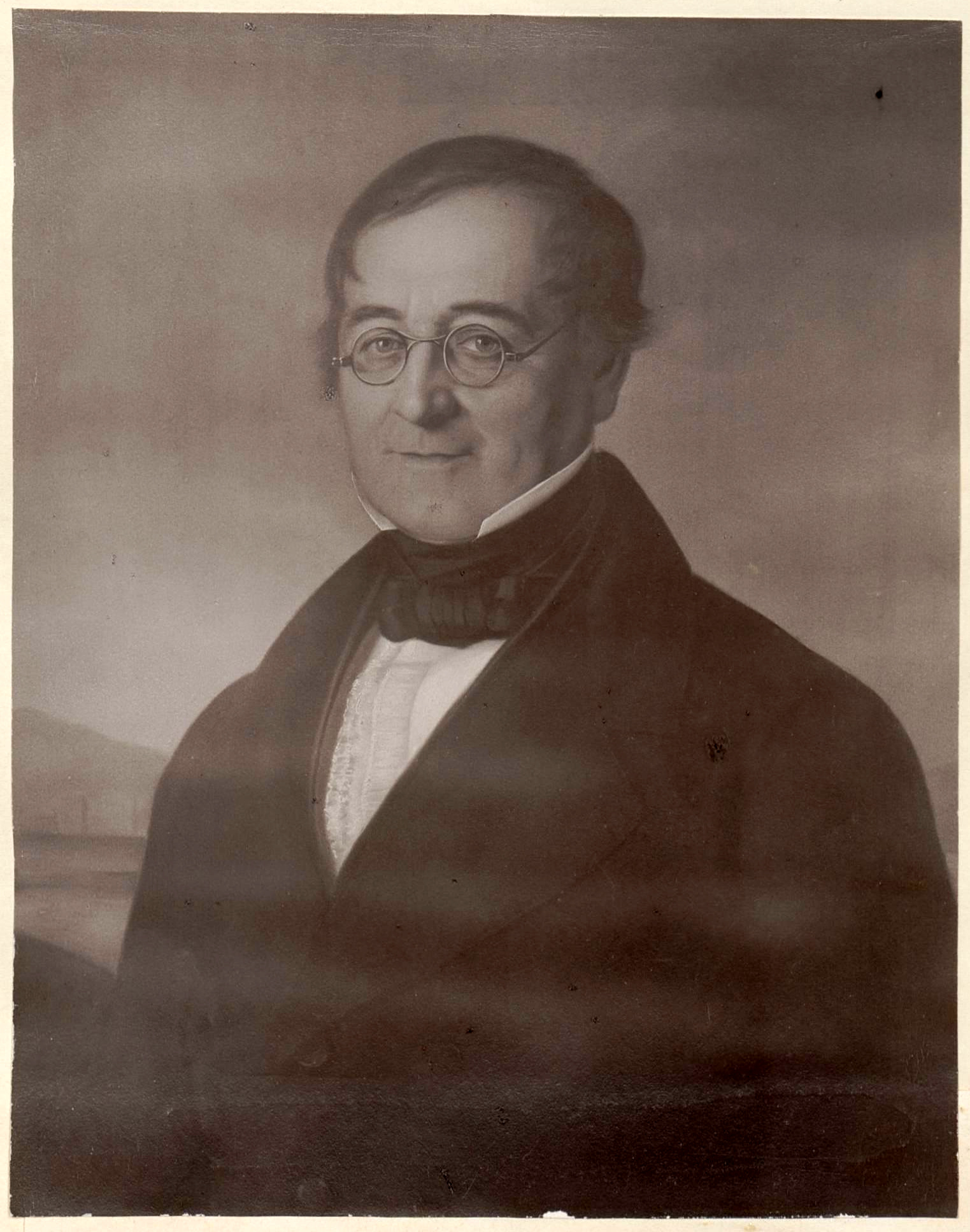
Benedikt of Poschinger

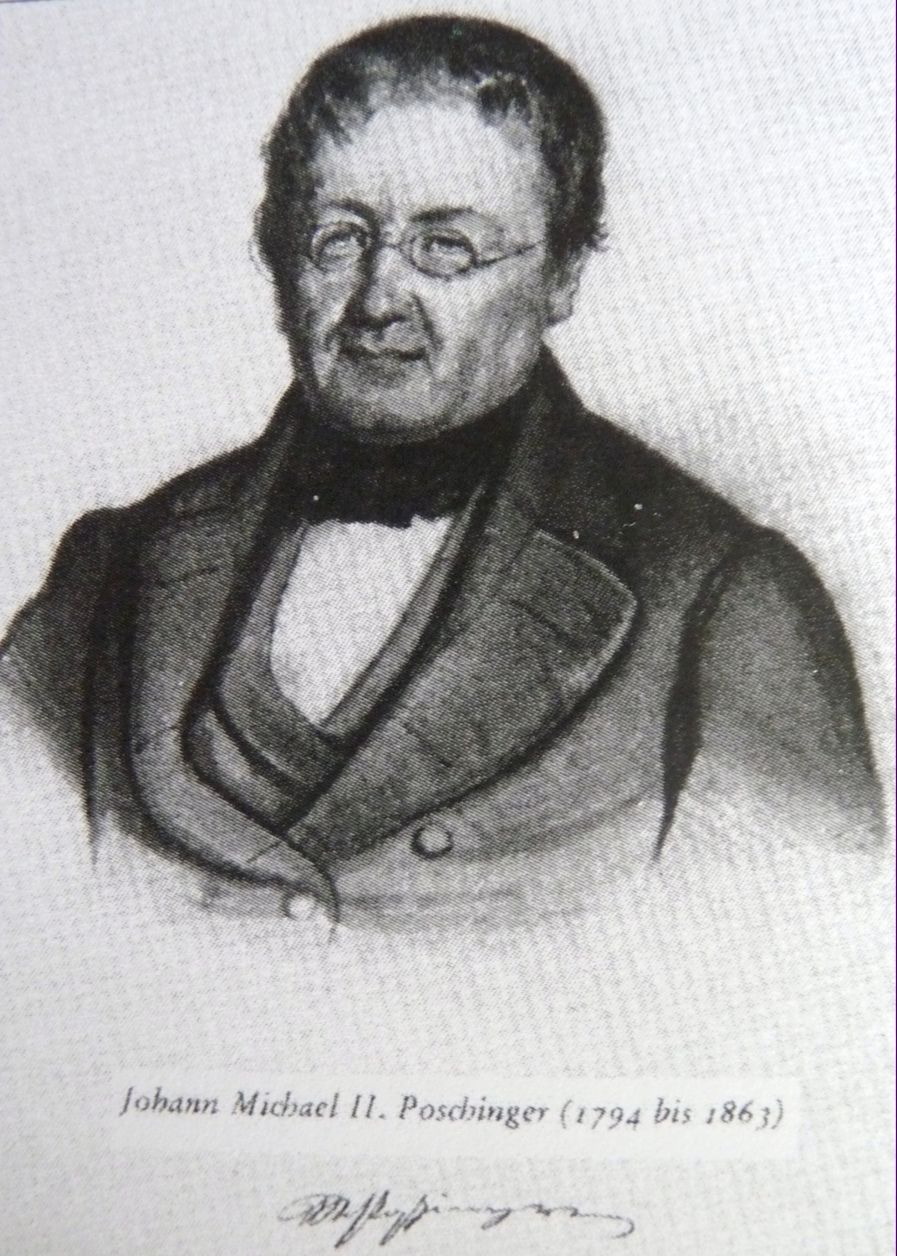
Johann Michael II. of Poschinger

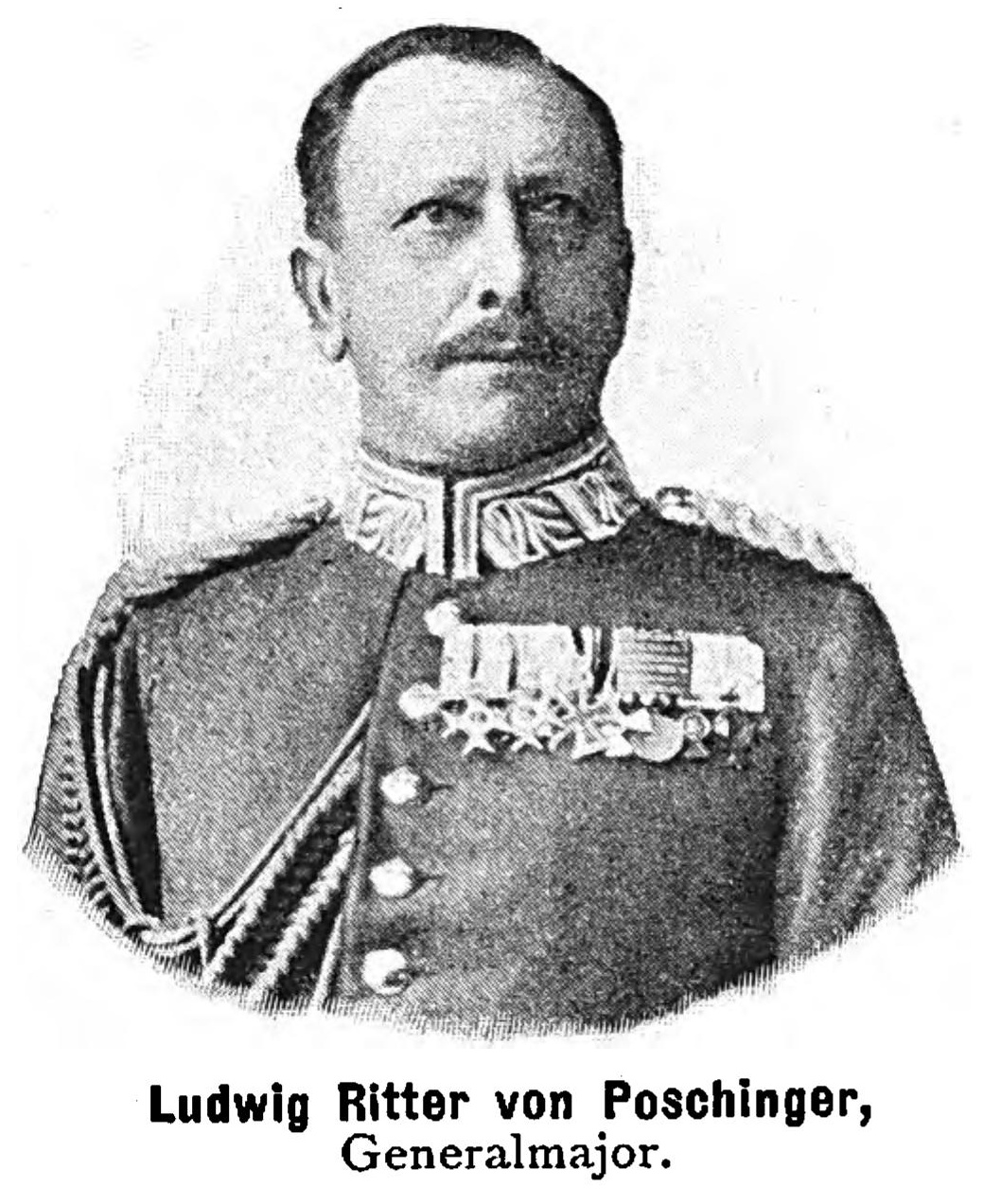
Ludwig of Poschinger

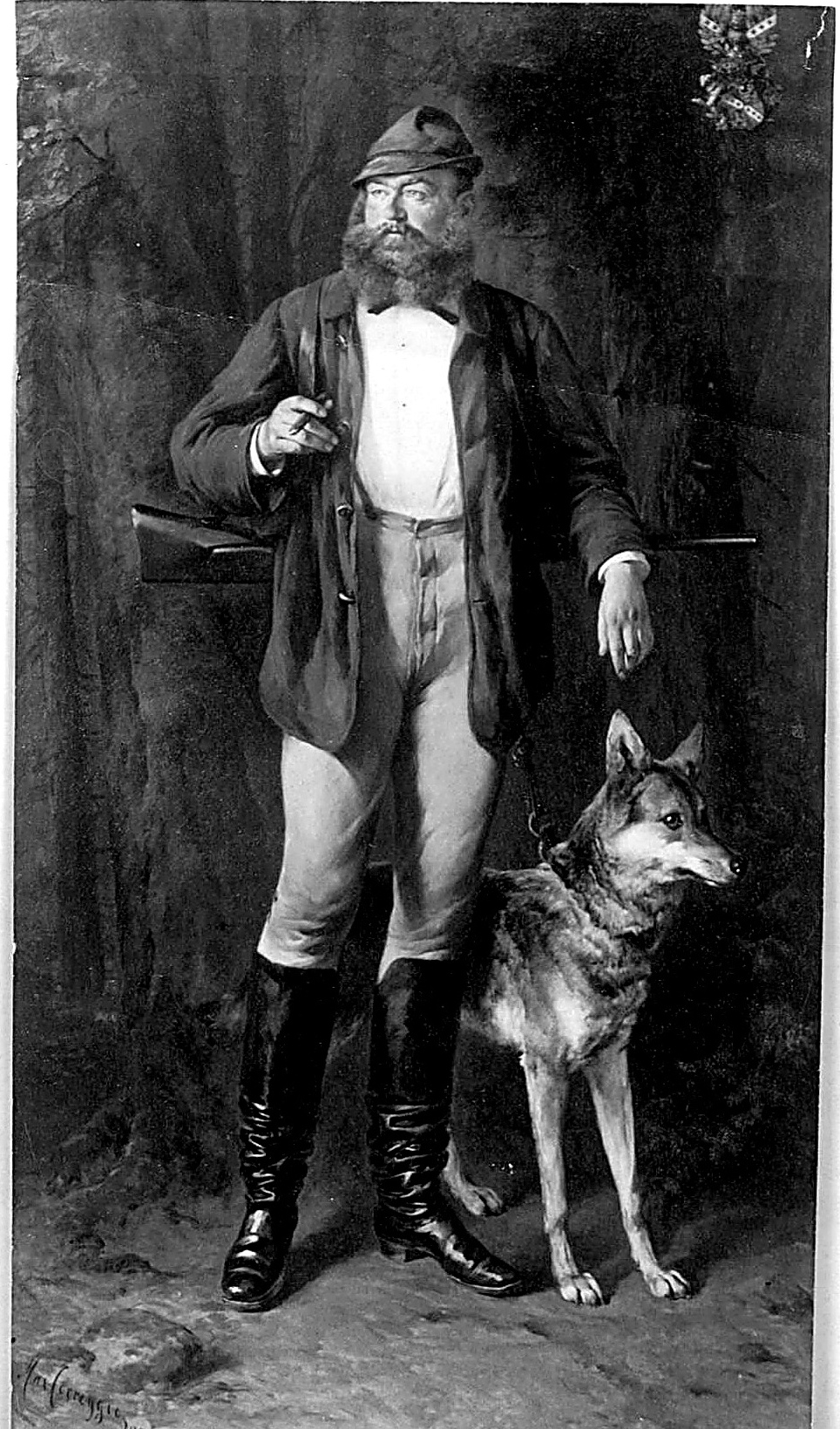
Georg Benedikt II. of Poschinger

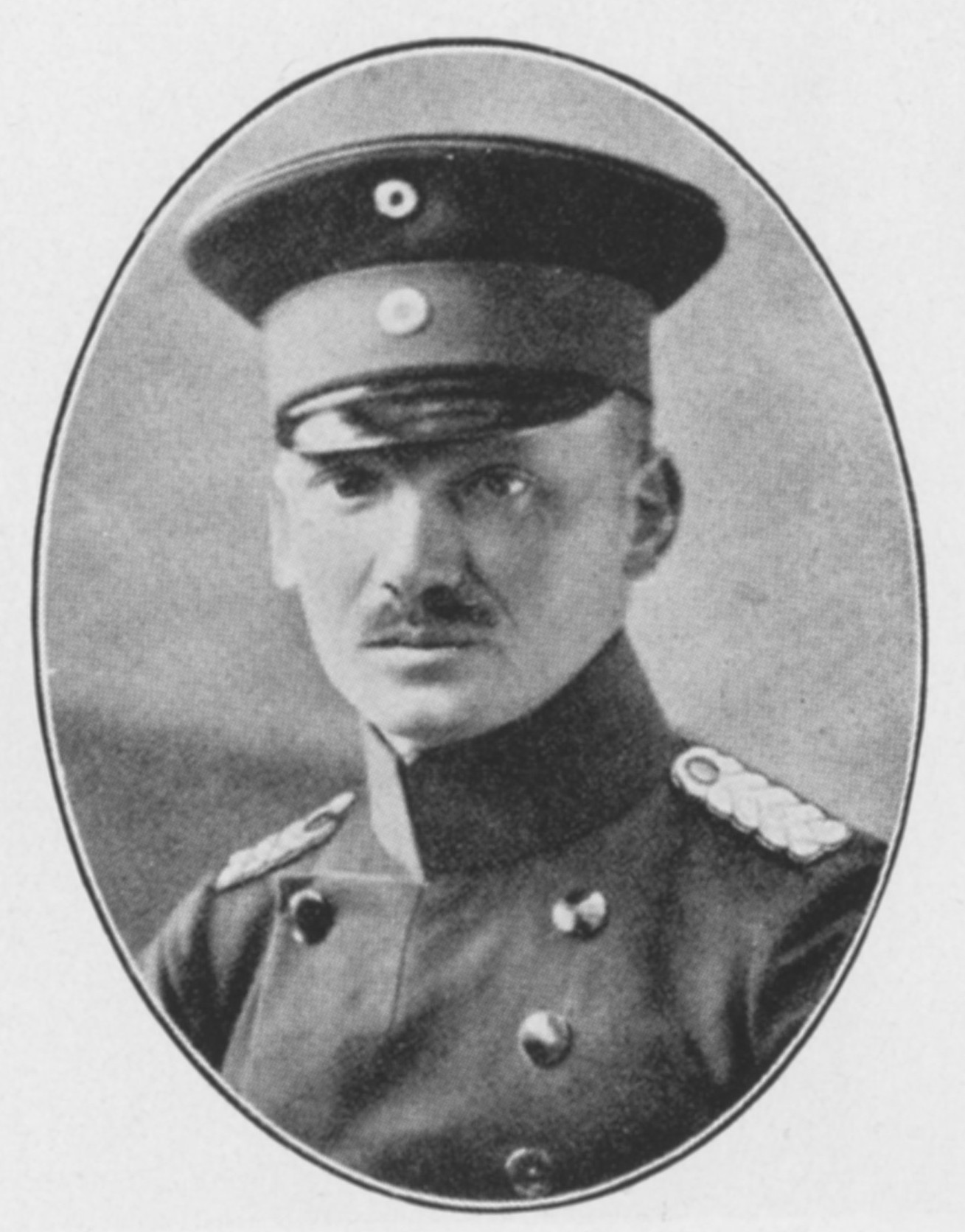
Eduard Poschinger of Frauenau
- Benedikt of Poschinger (1785–1856), Bavarian businessman and politician (Member of the State Parliament)
- Johann Michael II. of Poschinger (1794–1863), Bavarian businessman and politician (Member of the State Parliament)
- Richard of Poschinger (1839–1915), Bavarian painter
- Wilhelm of Poschinger (1839–1895), Bavarian businessman and landowner
- Ludwig of Poschinger (1844–1917), Bavarian general of cavalry
- Georg Benedikt II. of Poschinger (1845–1900), Bavarian businessman and politician (House of Councillors)
- Heinrich of Poschinger (1845–1911), Author and historian (Biographer of Bismarck)
- Henriette of Poschinger (1845–1903), Bavarian glass designer
- Wilhelm of Poschinger (1864–1921), Bavarian Major General
- Eduard Poschinger of Frauenau (1869–1942), Bavarian military officer, industrialist and politician (House of Councillors)
- Hans of Poschinger (1892–1951), Bavarian landowner and factory owner, also painter
- Egon of Poschinger (1894–1977), Bavarian landowner and factory owner, also painter
- Günther of Poschinger (1898–1958), Entomologist after whom the ground beetle Carabus Poschingerianus was named.
- Hippolyt Poschinger of Frauenau (1908–1990), Bavarian industrialist, forester and politician (President of the Bavarian Senate)
- Adalbert of Poschinger-Bray (1912–2001), German businessman, economist and politician

== Honors and place names ==
A Poschinger street exists in Frauenau as well as in Drachselsried, Deggendorf, Ismaning, Irlbach and Murnau. There is also a Poschinger street in Munich, named in 1906 in honor of Johann Michael III. of Poschinger, with Thomas Mann's home at Poschinger street 1. The Poschinger street in Berlin was named after Heinrich of Poschinger in 1908 and the street of the same name in Salzburg was named after Wilhelm of Poschinger in 1903. There is also the Lake Poschinger in the northern Isar valley near Munich.

Other streets bear the name of an individual family member, such as the Egon of Poschinger street in the Lichtenthal district of Zwiesel and the Richard of Poschinger street in Dachau.

Several place names derive from the family's glassworks and estates. Poschingerhütte and Altposchingerhütte ("Poschinger glassworks" and "old Poschinger glassworks") are officially recognized villages in the Regen district, in the municipalities of Arnbruck and Frauenau respectively. In Bohemia, Poschingrův Dvůr ("Poschinger farm") in Javorná recalls the farm of the branch of the family that emigrated there in 1639.

== Sources ==
- Genealogisches Handbuch des Adels. Adelige Häuser B. Edition 64, C. A. Starke Verlag, Limburg (Lahn) 1977, ISSN 0435-2408.
- Genealogisches Handbuch des Adels. Adelslexikon.Edition 119, C. A. Starke Verlag, Limburg (Lahn) 1999.
- Genealogisches Handbuch des Adels. Freiherrliche Häuser B. Edition 48, C. A. Starke Verlag, Limburg (Lahn) 1971.
- Genealogisches Handbuch des in Bayern immatrikulierten Adels. Band XXX, Wissenschaftlicher Kommissionsverlag Stegaurach, Stegaurach 2014.
- Ernst Heinrich Kneschke: Neues allgemeines deutsches Adels-Lexicon, Edition 7, Leipzig 1867
- Karl Ritter von Poschinger: Geschichte der Poschinger und ihrer Güter. Pullach bei Aibling 1908.
- Karl Ritter von Poschinger: Zusammenstellung der Poschinger vor 1520. Rosenheim 1934.
- Karl und Ludwig Ritter von Poschinger, Hippolyt Freiherr Poschinger von Frauenau, et al.: Verzeichnis der Nachkommen des Joachim Poschinger. 2014.
- Max Peinkofer: 350 Jahre Poschinger in Frauenau. Frauenau 1955.
- August Sieghardt: Die Poschinger in der Oberpfalz. in: Die Oberpfalz. Edition 43, 1955.
- Ingeborg Seyfert: Die Poschinger von Frauenau als Glashüttenherren im Bayerischen Wald. in: Amtlicher Schulanzeiger für den Regierungsbezirk Niederbayern. Edition 5, 1971.
- Werner Pohl: Die Poschinger im Viechtreich: Als Pfleger von Linden u. als Hofmarksherren von Neunußberg, Wettzell, Drachselried u. Thalersdorf. Viechtach 1976.
- Hermann Wagner: Die Aufschreibungen des Franz Poschinger (1637–1701) vom Glashüttengut Frauenau. Sauerlach 1985.
- Marita Haller: Traumschloss im Wald. Das ehemalige Schloss der Freiherrn Poschinger von Frauenau. edition Lichtland, Freyung 2013.
