= Holzen Abbey =

- Abtei Fraulautern
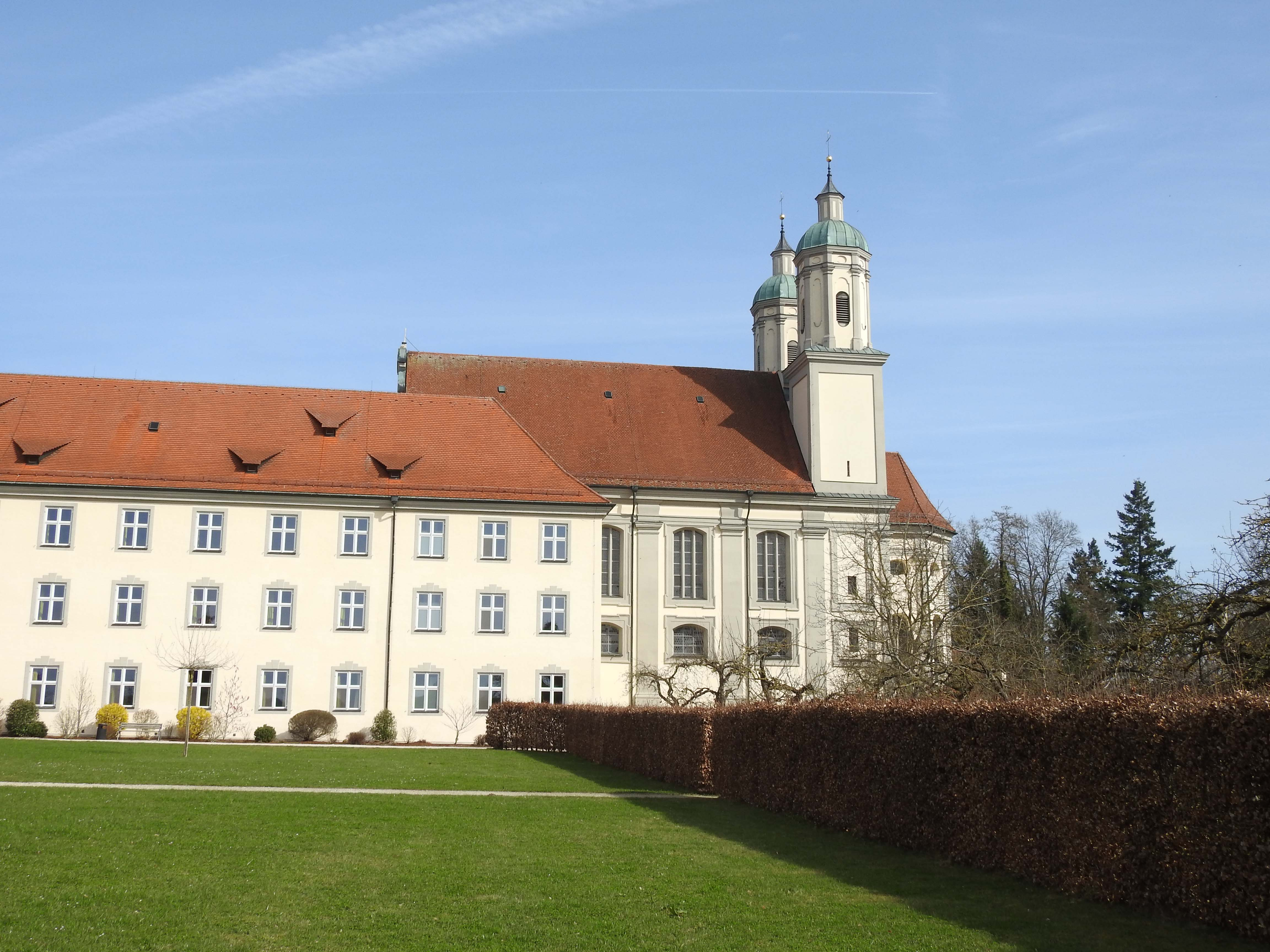
- Monastery buildings and church.

- Location within Bavaria Location within Germany
- Interactive map of Holzen Abbey

Monastery information
- Established: 12th century
- Dedication: St. Benedict

Site
- Location: Bavaria, Germany
- Coordinates: 48°36′15″N 10°48′52″E

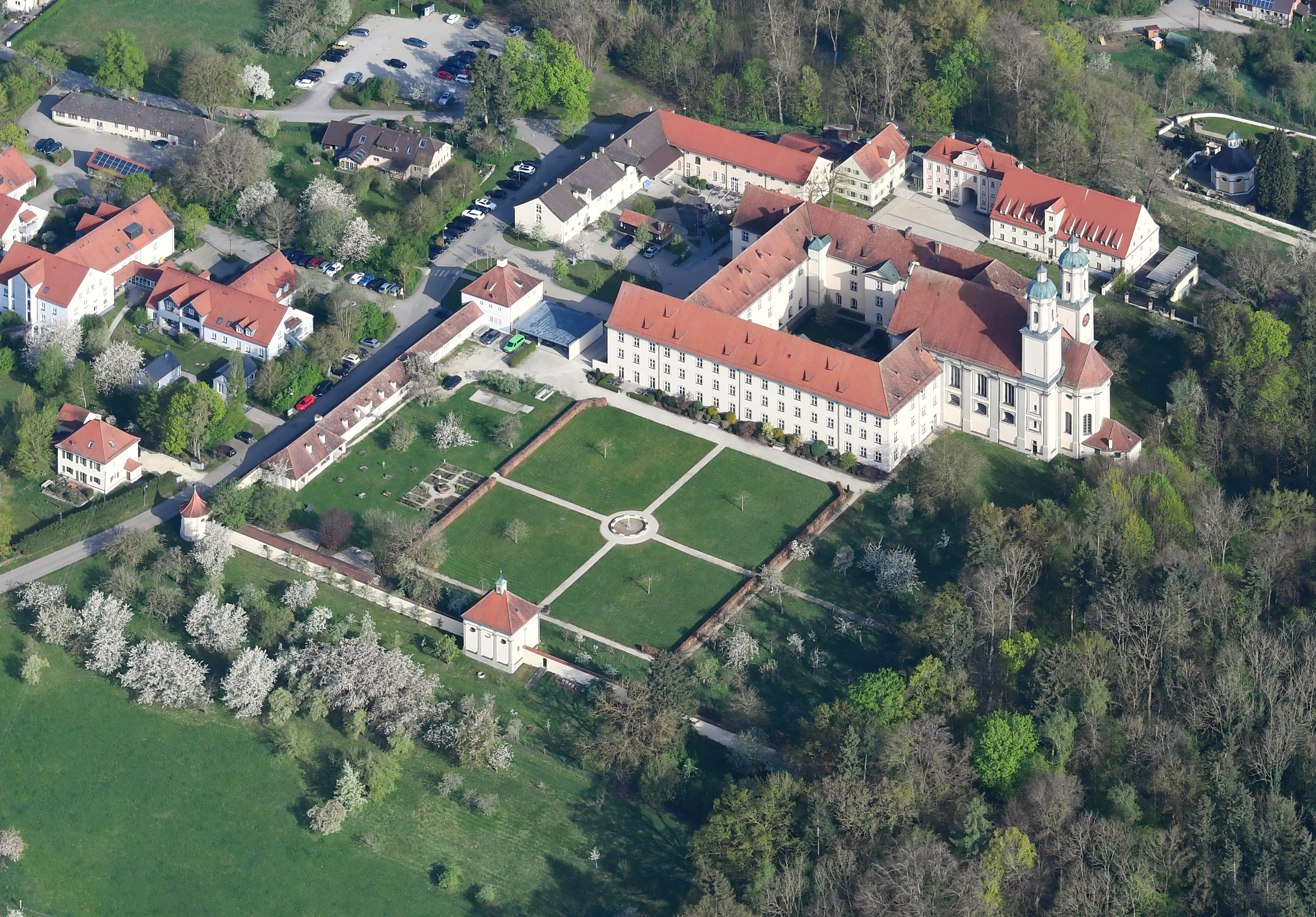
Aerial view of Holzen Abbey

Holzen Abbey (Kloster Holzen) was a convent of Benedictine nuns situated in the village of Holzen (west of the B2 at Nordendorf above the Schmutter) in Allmannshofen in Bavaria, Germany.

== History ==
The abbey has a rich history dating back to its legendary founding in 1150 by Marquard von Donnersberg as a double monastery for both monks and nuns. However, the monastery for monks was dissolved in 1470 as part of the Melker reform, while the nuns' convent continued to grow and expand.

The monastery faced significant challenges during its history, including severe damage during the Peasants' War in 1525 and abandonment in 1632 due to a Swedish invasion. However, the nuns returned in 1647, and in 1696, the foundation stone for the current monastery was laid on the Karlsberg mountain.

The monastery was dissolved during the secularization period but was handed over to the princes of Hohenzollern-Sigmaringen, who allowed the nuns to remain. In 1813, the complex was transferred by marriage to the counts of Fischler-Treuberg.

Between July and October 1877 the painter Wilhelm Leibl lived on the monastic lands in Holzen and his home became a meeting place for the painters from Munich who gathered around him, as well as where he painted his portrait of Rosine Edle von Poschinger, sister of Bismarck's biographer Heinrich von Poschinger. He also painted Count Treuberg, whose son Ernst Ludwig Count Fischler von Treuberg in 1904 married Hetta Countess Treuberg, later known as a pacifist, who stayed on at Holzen until their divorce in 1914. Ferdinand Fischler von Treuberg's relative Pedro II of Brazil often visited Holzen, as did Carlo Caputo, apostolic nuncio to the king of Bavaria.

== Abbey Church ==
The Church of St. John the Baptist, consecrated in 1710, features a Baroque interior with stucco work by Benedikt Vogel and sculptures by Ehrgott Bernhard Bendl. It became a pilgrimage site to the Christ Child from 1740 onwards.

== Present Day ==
In 1897, Dominikus Ringeisen founded the Congregation of St. Joseph of Ursberg, focusing on caring for people with disabilities. In 1927, the Treuberg family sold the monastery buildings to the St. Josef Congregation of Ursberg, which transformed the abbey into a facility offering living and working opportunities for people with disabilities.

As of 2022 there are seventy-two sisters working at four sites. In 1996 the congregation established the "Dominikus-Ringeisen-Werk" as an independent church foundation under public law and transferred ownership of the abbey to DRW. In 2008 Kloster Holzen GmbH was founded. The convent has been redeveloped as a hotel and conference center. It also hosts a pilgrim building, providing accommodations at reduced price. One of the routes for the Way of St. James runs directly past the Hotel Kloster Holzen; the Romantic Road is not far.

There is also a daycare centre for the elderly on site. The results of their creativity and skill can be seen at the Hotel Kloster Holzen and be purchased at the Kloster Holzen shop.

== See also ==
- Ursberg Abbey
