= Peter Hößl =

German serial killer (1940–2022)

- Born: 10 July 1940; Munich, Bavaria, Germany
- Died: April 2022 (aged 82); Straubing, Bavaria, Germany
- Status: Deceased
- Motive: Sexual gratification
- Criminal charges: Negligent homicide, attempted murder (1958); Murder (1962 and 1983)
- Penalty: 4 years imprisonment (1958); 15 years imprisonment followed by indefinite involuntary commitment (1962); Life imprisonment (1983)

Details
- Date: 1956, 1959–1960, 1982
- Country: Germany
- State: Bavaria
- Killed: 4–6
- Weapons: Rifle; Pistol

Peter Hößl (10 July 1940 – April 2022) was a German serial killer who murdered at least four people in Munich district between 1956 and 1982.

Hößl was first convicted in 1958 as a juvenile for the murder of a pre-teen boy, but freed after a year of youth detention. In 1962, he received a life sentence for killing two men in separate incidents, remaining in custody for 19 years before he was released on parole. Hößl was again convicted of murdering a second boy in 1983, after which he remained incarcerated until his death in 2022.

== Biography ==
=== Early life ===
Hößl was born to wealthy parents in Munich, as the son of a millionaire furniture businessman. After finishing mandatory schooling, Hößl undertook a business education, as he was expected to take over the company as an adult. He stole several thousand Deutsche Mark from his father's finances to buy a rifle, which he secretly took out for shooting in empty fields. Psychologists at Hößl's final murder trial stated that his fascination with firearms had a "strong sexual component".

=== First murder ===
On 24 November 1956, Hößl, aged 16, fatally shot 11-year-old student Franz Stöbich on Vogelweideplatz in Bogenhausen. Stöbich was shot five times from a close distance using a long rifle and covered with leaves and rocks. Initially, Norbert Wanger, a teenage weapons collector and friend of Stöbich, was arrested. During interrogation, Wanger claimed that he shot Stöbich by accident when aiming at a rock in front of him, then killed him to "not have him live as a cripple", repeating the confession three times, but recanting shortly after each. The statement did not align with the fact that Stöbich was shot from behind and it was later revealed that Wanger had been manipulated by police. He was coerced to repeat a version coached by officers, who claimed it would result in a more lenient sentence for him.

In February 1957, a forester in Perlacher Forst discovered a leather gun case pierced with bulletholes and a rifle, which both belonged to Peter Hößl. Hößl admitted to the killing, but lied that the first shot was a misfire and that he kept pulling the trigger as a panic reaction. During his two-day trial by a juvenile court, Hößl was represented by Rolf Bossi, who argued that Stöbich was killed accidentally by his client. On 18 January 1958, he was convicted of negligent homicide and attempted murder, and sentenced to four years imprisonment. Bossi was credited for this unusually low sentence in his first highly publicised murder trial. On 13 February 1959, Hößl received early release after doctors judged him to have made "excellent" progress in his rehabilitation.

In a letter written to his cousin Michael in East Germany shortly after his release, Hößl admitted to sneaking up on Stöbich and shooting the boy in the back, using his gun case as a makeshift suppressor. He boasted how it was "the perfect murder", further adding, "I'll be damned if it remains my last". It has been alleged that Hößl's father was aware of the letter's contents, but he nevertheless continued to financially support Hößl and provided him with living accommodations. Hößl returned to his business education and was employed by a friend of his father. He again embezzled funds to buy guns from illicit gun dealers. Hößl later described that he used the weapons primarily for sexual purposes, taking his primariy rifle to sleep in bed and using it to shoot at posters from pornographic magazines on the walls of his room. He developed a habit of loading and aiming a rifle while posing in front of a full-length mirror, masturbating to his own image and the thought of shooting someone.

=== Second murders ===
On 23 May 1959, Hößl drove to Perlacher Forst, where he wandered around for several hours before finding 59-year-old retiree Johann Huber lounging on an air mattress while reading. Hößl shot the man in the chest from a close distance, being briefly scared off when Huber lunged at him before Hößl killed Huber with a gunshot to the head. He hid Huber's body in a cardboard box and left it along with the gun in the nearby treelines. Police found both shortly after, but had no leads in the murder. The same year, Hößl bought a rifle and hid it in Perlach forest, but it was found by a hiker and handed to police.

Hößl would later become a suspect in the double murder of 19-year-old Wolfgang Hack and his 16-year-old fiancée Edeltraud Winkler in Schleißheim on 20 September 1959. The couple had been killed by gunfire in a seemingly random attack during a walk in Berglwald. Police described the arrest of an unnamed man suspected in another homicide case, but there was no physical evidence against Hößl, who kept silent about potential involvement.

On 25 June 1960, while walking around the wooded outskirts of Munich, Hößl killed 19-year-old labourer Gerhard Habel as the latter was riding his bicycle. Hößl had jumped into Habel's path and incapacitated him with two gunshots from a pistol, killing him with another two gunshots as he was on the ground before fleeing the scene.

Police connected the murders of Huber and Habel, linking them to the rifle found in the same forest. Investigators tracked down the seller of the guns and arrested Hößl on 14 January 1961 at an arranged meeting at Mathäser, where Hößl tried to return the weapon he used to kill Habel. Although Hößl would have normally been tried as a juvenile since he was under the age of 21, the judge decided to try him as an adult, stating Hößl had "full intellectual maturity" and "acted with cold indifference" while carrying out the killings. Psychologists attested that Hößl acted out of sexual impulses, stating he received "intense arousal and stimulation" from the usage of firearms. Rolf Bossi again represented Hößl in court, emphasising the doctors' findings and arguing that Hößl could not be held responsible for his abnormal sexual desires. On 9 July 1962, he was sentenced to 15 years imprisonment followed by indefinite holding in a psychiatric ward.

In 1979, Hößl became engaged to his childhood friend Irene Niedermayer, after the two had begun a prison correspondence. Beginning in November 1980, while housed at Haar Mental Hospital, Hößl began receiving privileges as part of his treatment. Three months later, he was transferred to a halfway house. In March 1981, Hößl was allowed work release and on 21 December 1981, he was released on parole. According to the hospital director, Dr. Wietrzychowski, the decision was made without his involvement.

=== Final murder ===
On 26 August 1982, Hößl ambushed 15-year-old Peter Sigl while the boy was collecting maize for his pet birds outside of Ismaning. Sigl was shot multiple times with a 7,65 mm caliber gun, after which Hößl hid the victim's bicycle. Police immediately suspected that a patient from nearby Haar killed Sigl, since the murder appeared random, with no signs of sexual assault or robbery. Patient records led investigators to Peter Hößl, due to the same modus operandi, but during questioning, Hößl denied any involvement. He first claimed to have remained in Munich during the killing to renovate his future mother-in-law's house, but claimed to have misremembered the facts after police confronted him with evidence to the contrary.

In October 1982, townsfolk in Ismaning discovered a revolver and a Walther PPK during communal cleaning of the Seebach, near the Sigl crime scene. Six weeks later, a second semi-automatic handgun was found hidden on a tree on the property of Hößl's fiancée in Munich. The Walther was identified as the murder weapon and found to have been a former police sidearm which had been converted into a gas pistol before being illegally restored to its original state. Police tracked down the seller of the two semi-automatic pistols, who identified Hößl as the buyer. After Hößl was arrested, he accused police of discriminating against him for his previous murder convictions.

==== Trial ====
During his trial at Munich's Justizpalast, Hößl was diagnosed with a schizoid personality, with psychopathic tendencies. The prosecution argued that Hößl had a "lust for murder", hence the random selection of victims. Hößl acknowledged that he was "sick" and that he had tried to seek psychological treatment after his second release, but had received no proper diagnosis. Hößl filed for the recusal of presiding judge Raimund Krämer from the case for showing bias after Krämer interrupted Hößl's defence counsel Christoph Rückel to tell him that the defendant's requests for the show of evidence "would be going nowhere". The motion was denied for lack of merit.

On 28 July 1983, the day the verdict was originally set for, 30-year-old Walter Wilhelm Fink claimed to have committed the murder of Peter Sigl to jail authorities. Fink, who had been arrested for a disco robbery in August 1982 and briefly escaped custody in Bayreuth, was brought before the judge, but could not answer to any details about the case, only repeating "I did it". Hößl and his attorney denied allegations of paying Fink for the false confession, stating Hößl "didn't want it, nor does he need it".

In August 1983, Hößl was sentenced to life imprisonment at Straubing Prison, where he died in April 2022.

== See also ==
- List of German serial killers
