= Msg systems ag =

German information technology company

msg systems AG
- Industry: IT services
- Founded: 1980

msg systems ag is a German information technology services and systems integration company headquartered in Ismaning, near Munich. It was founded on 31 January 1980 by Hans Zehetmaier, Herbert Enzbrenner and Pius Pflügler and forms the core of the msg group of companies.

== History ==
Msg systems was founded in 1980. In 2012 it became the majority shareholder of Austrian consultancy Plaut AG. In 2014, COR&FJA AG (then already part of the msg group) announced it would change its name to msg life ag. In 2021, msg Gillardon AG merged with BSM BankingSysteme und Managementberatung GmbH to form msg GillardonBSM AG.
