= Walter Schmitt Glaeser =

German politician (1933–2024)

President of the Bavarian Senate
- In office 11 January 1994 – 28 January 1996

Personal details
- Born: 2 October 1933 Munich, Bavaria, Germany
- Died: 11 June 2024 (aged 90)
- Party: CSU
- Education: LMU Munich; University of Würzburg
- Occupation: Lawyer

Walter Schmitt Glaeser (2 October 1933 – 11 June 2024) was a German politician and author. A member of the Christian Social Union in Bavaria, he served as president of the Bavarian Senate from 1994 to 1996.

Schmitt Glaeser died on 11 June 2024, at the age of 90.
