= Hippolyt Freiherr Poschinger von Frauenau =

President of the Bavarian Senate
- In office 9 January 1968 – 14 January 1982
- Preceded by: Josef Singer
- Succeeded by: Hans Weiß

Vice President of the Bavarian Senate
- In office 8 July 1964 – 10 January 1968
- Preceded by: Theo Eppig
- Succeeded by: Josef Listl

Personal details
- Party: Christian Social Union in Bavaria

Hippolyt Theodor Wilhelm Georg Benedikt Johannes Maria Freiherr Poschinger von Frauenau (born 19 June 1908 in Bamberg, Kingdom of Bavaria, German Empire; died 20 July 1990 in Zwiesel, Bavaria, West Germany) was a German businessman, forest manager and politician.

== Life ==
Poschinger was the son of the Imperial Councillor of the Crown of Bavaria Eduard Freiherr Poschinger von Frauenau and on his mother's side a great-grandson of the Bavarian Prime Minister Count Otto of Bray-Steinburg. He was a member of the Poschinger glassmaking dynasty in the Bavarian Forest.

He attended primary schools in Regensburg and Frauenau and from 1919 to 1926, the humanistic high school of the Benedictine monastery in Ettal. In 1930, he graduated from the Ludwig-Maximilians-Universität München with a degree in forestry, and in December of the same year he took over the administration of his father's agricultural and forestry property on the Oberfrauenau estate, which had been badly affected by hurricanes and hailstorms the previous year. The von Poschinger glass factory belongs to the estate.

On 11 June 1938, he married Maria Immaculata Countess of Soden-Fraunhofen (1907-1989) in Windberg, with whom he had two sons and three daughters.

In 1952, the regional committee of the Bavarian Farmers' Association elected him to the Bavarian Senate as a representative of the forestry industry. There he took over the office of 1st Vice President in 1964, and was elected President of the Bavarian 2nd Chamber (Senate) on 10 January 1968. In 1980, he handed over his estate to his son Stephan and retired from the Senate three years later. From 1968 until his retirement from the Senate, he was additionally a member of the administrative board of the Bayerischer Rundfunk (Bavarian Broadcasting).

In addition, Poschinger was also chairman of the Bavarian Forest Owners' Association since 1960.

Hippolyt Freiherr Poschinger von Frauenau died on 20 July 1990 at the age of 82.

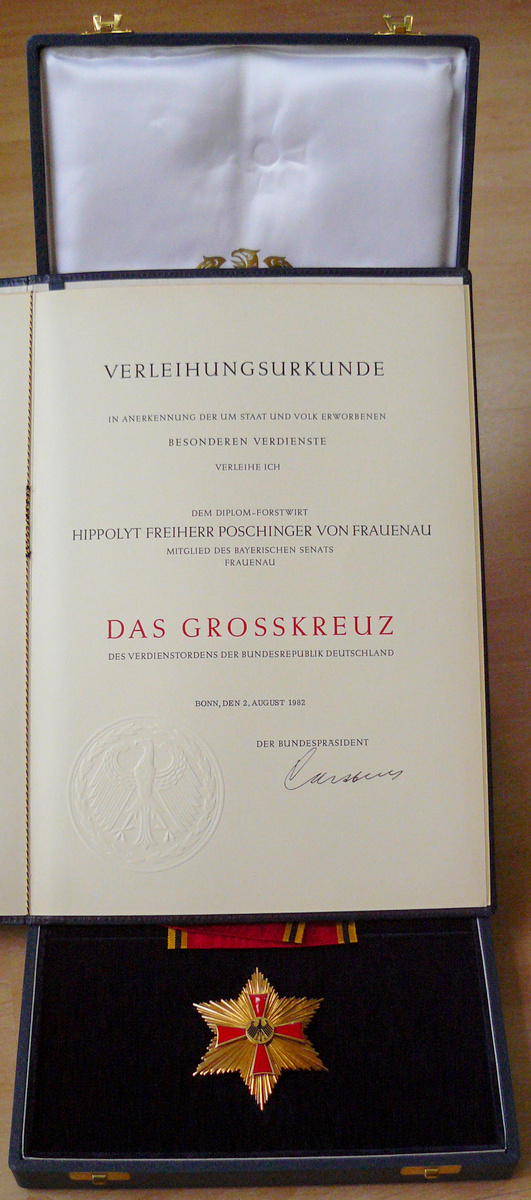
Award Certificate for the Grand Cross of the Order of Merit of the Federal Republic of Germany

== Orders and Decorations ==
- 1961: Bavarian Order of Merit
- 1968: Great Cross of the Order of Merit of the Federal Republic of Germany
- 1973: Great Cross with Star of the Order of Merit of the Federal Republic of Germany
- 1978: Great Cross with Star and Sash of the Order of Merit of the Federal Republic of Germany
- 1973: Bavarian State Medal for special merits in the field of food, agriculture and forestry as well as rural development
- 1982: Grand Cross 1st Class of the Order of Merit of the Federal Republic of Germany
