= Ursberg Abbey =

Coordinates: 48°15′58″N 10°26′47″E

Imperial Abbey of Ursberg Reichskloster Ursberg
- 1143–1803
- Coat of arms
- Status: Imperial Abbey
- Capital: Ursberg
- Government: Theocracy
- Historical era: Middle Ages
  - Founded: 1126–28
  - Gained Reichsfreiheit: 1143
  - Secularised to Bavaria: 1803
Succeeded by
Electorate of Bavaria
- Today part of: Germany

Ursberg Abbey (German: Kloster Ursberg) is a former Premonstratensian monastery, now a convent of the Franciscan St. Joseph's Congregation, situated in the small village of Ursberg in the district of Günzburg, Bavaria.

== History ==
The monastery, dedicated to Saint Peter and Saint John the Evangelist, was founded between 1126 and 1128 by the nobleman Wernher of Schwabegg-Balzhausen. It was the first Premonstratensian foundation in southern Germany. The monastery became an Imperial abbey (Reichsstift) in 1143.

As was usual with early Premonstratensian foundations, this was originally a double monastery, with a separate nunnery, which lasted until at least 1320 or so. Ursberg was very active in its early years in settling other Premonstratensian houses. This was largely due to the energetic prior Grimo, who was later declared Blessed.

In 1126 Roggenburg Abbey was founded. In 1128 Osterhofen near Passau was established, followed in about 1130 by Roggenburg Abbey and in 1135 by Kaisheim Abbey. In 1140 Premonstratensians from Ursberg took over Schäftlarn Abbey, and in 1142 Bishop Otto of Freising used them for the foundation of Neustift Abbey in Freising.

The church was built in about 1230. Originally a Romanesque structure, it was refurbished in the Baroque style by the master builder of Wettenhausen Abbey, Josef Dossenberger the younger. The ceiling frescoes by Jakob Fröschle and Konrad Huber also stem from this period.

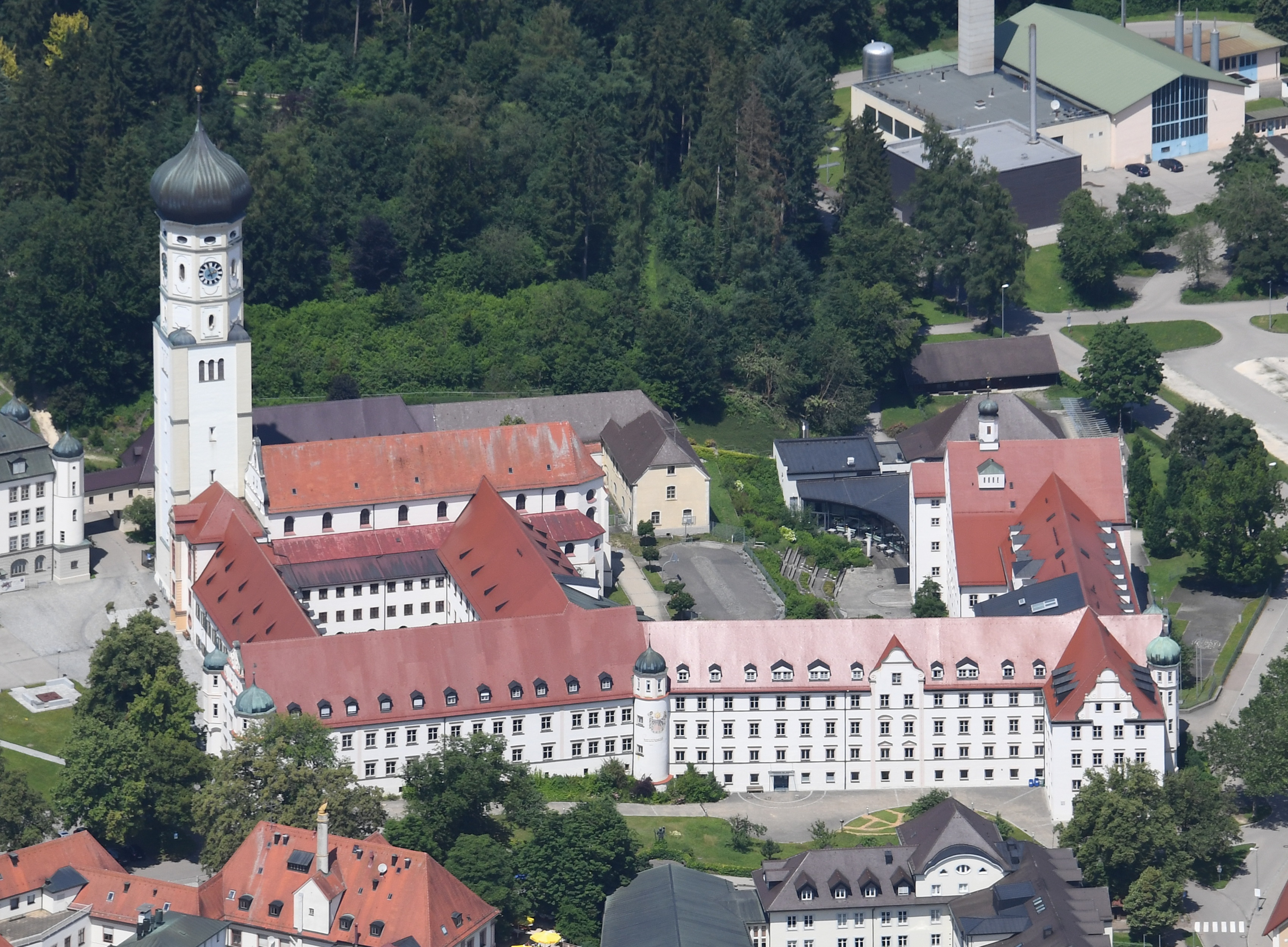
Aerial view of the Ursberg Abbey

The Romanesque cross with the attendant figures of the Virgin Mary and John the Evangelist is of especial note. The high altar is by J. Pflaum. The organ was built by Johann Nepomuk Holzhey.

The abbey was dissolved in 1803 in the course of the secularisation of Bavaria. The church became the parish church, and the priest's house and the regional court (Landgericht) of Krumbach were accommodated in the former monastic premises. In 1884 Father Dominikus Ringeisen managed to acquire the buildings, which were by then empty, where he set up a community of sisters for the care of the physically and mentally handicapped, now known as the Dominikus-Ringeisen-Werk. This endeavour developed into the St. Joseph's Congregation of Ursberg, a Franciscan community of about 270 sisters. In Ursberg, along with branches in Maria Bildhausen, the former Holzen Abbey, Pfaffenhausen and Breitbrunn am Ammersee, about 2,500 handicapped people are provided with accommodation and work, care and home.

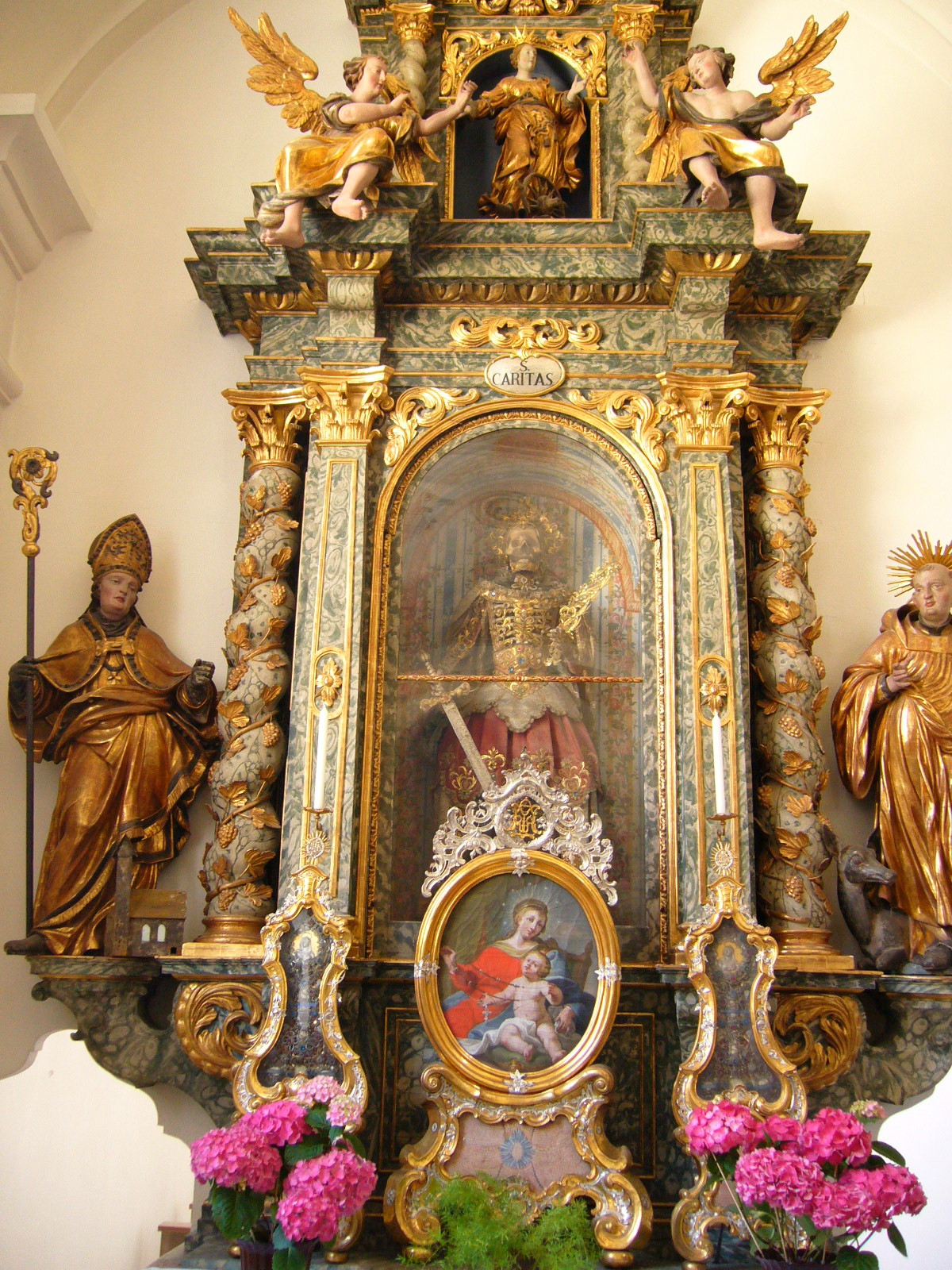
An altar inside the abbey

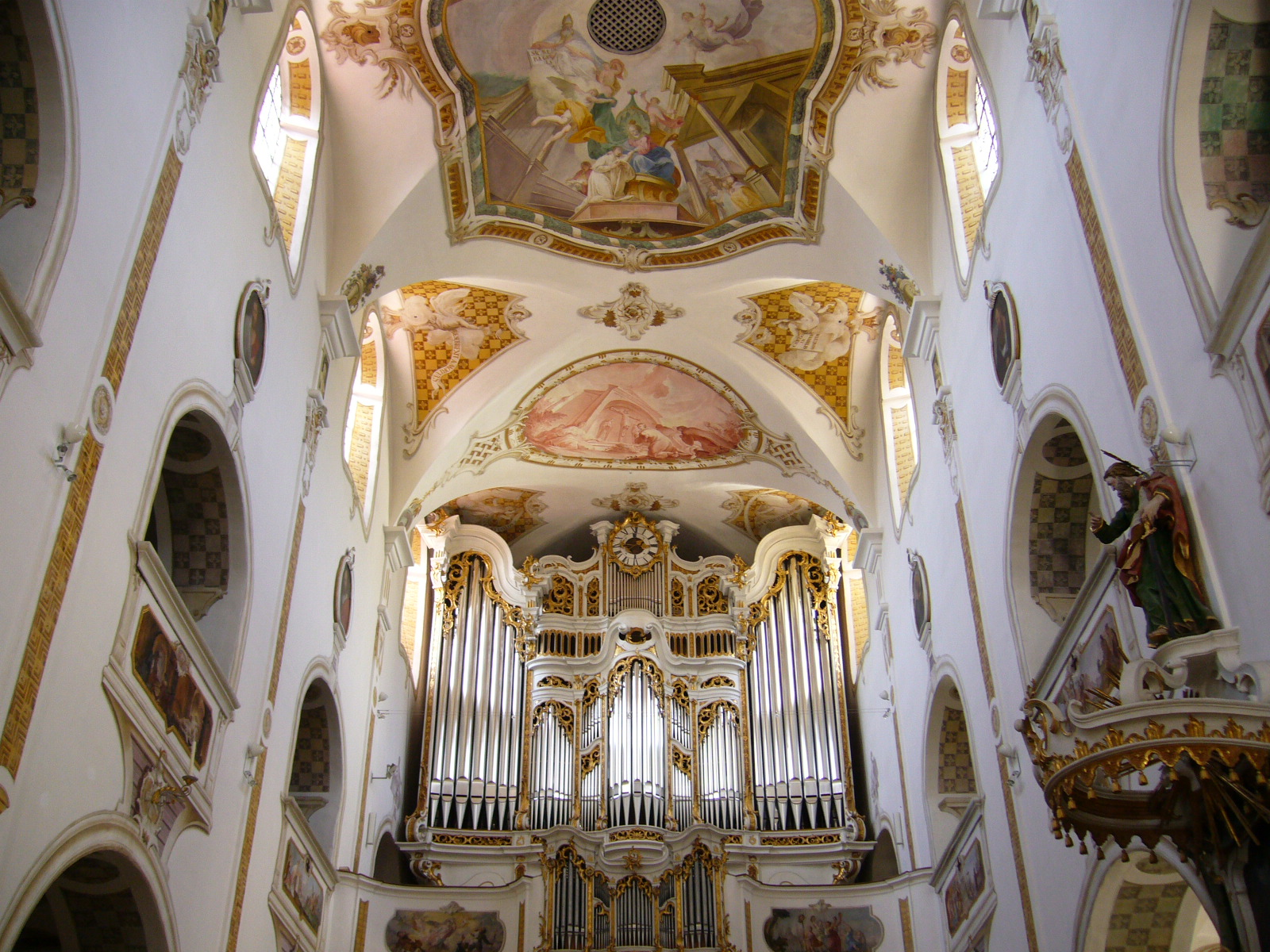
The roof and an organ
