= Ismaning Palace =

Baroque palace in Bohemia, Germany

Coordinates: 48.2281°N 11.6741°E

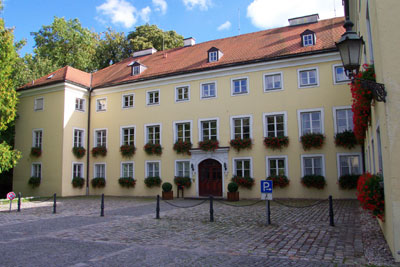
Courtyard of Ismaning Palace

Ismaning Palace (German: Schloss Ismaning) is a Baroque palace in Ismaning. It currently serves as the town hall.

== History ==
The palace was built in 1530 by Philip of the Palatinate in the Renaissance style. From 1716 to 1724, it was transformed by Johann Franz Eckher into the Baroque style. In 1816, it was taken over by Napoleon's stepson, Eugène de Beauharnais, and his wife, Princess Augusta of Bavaria. According to the neoclassical plans of the court architect Leo von Klenze, the palace experienced further remodelling in 1836. Starting in 1853, the palace underwent several changes of ownership over the next decades. The last private owner, Johann Michael III. Knight and Edler of Poschinger, builder of the Ismaning peat railway, donated the castle as well as the estates Zengermoos and Karlshof to the city of Munich in 1899. From 1899 to 1919, it was owned by the city of Munich. Since 1919, it has been owned by the municipality of Ismaning.
