= Heinrich von Poschinger =

German writer and historian (1845–1911)

Heinrich Joseph Karl Ludwig Ritter und Edler von Poschinger (31 August 1845, Munich, Germany - 10 August 1911, La Bollène, France) was a German writer and historian. A street in the Bismarckviertel quarter of Berlin-Steglitz is named after him.

== Life ==
He was one of the Poschingers, an old Bavarian family descended from Joachim Poschinger (1523–1599), Lord of Zwieselau (Landkreis Regen) - the family is first documented in 1140. He studied law and philosophy in the Ludwig-Maximilians-Universität München and later moved to study the same subjects in Berlin. He then returned to Munich, where he graduated. In 1883 he married Margarethe (2 May 1861, Breslau - 1911, La Bollène), daughter of Jakob von Landau, a freiherr and member of the Privy Council of Commerce - she converted to Catholicism in 1883.

He immediately began a job in the Bavarian civil service. In 1876 he moved to the Reich Chancellery in Berlin and worked there until 1900, meeting Otto von Bismarck - he became known for publishing Bismarck's political files, letters and talks and writing papers on him as a diarist, economist, parliamentarian, federal councillor and diarist. He also dealt with the estate of president Otto Theodor von Manteuffel. After Bismarck's death, Poschinger left government service and returns to Nice, where he founded a German-language daily newspaper entitled Riviera-Tageblatt.

== Selected works ==
- Preußen im Bundestag 1851–1859
- Ein Achtundvierziger. Lothar Buchers Leben und Werk
- Die wirtschaftlichen Verträge Deutschlands (1890–1894, 3 Bd.).
- Die wirtschaftlichen Verträge Deutschlands München: Lindauer, 1870 - VIII, 270 S.
