= Hans Christiansen =

Hans Christiansen may refer to:

- Hans Christiansen (artist)
- Hans Christiansen (bishop), Australian bishop
- Hans Christiansen (sailor)
- Hans Jørgen Christiansen, Danish footballer
