= Stephansposching =

- Municipality
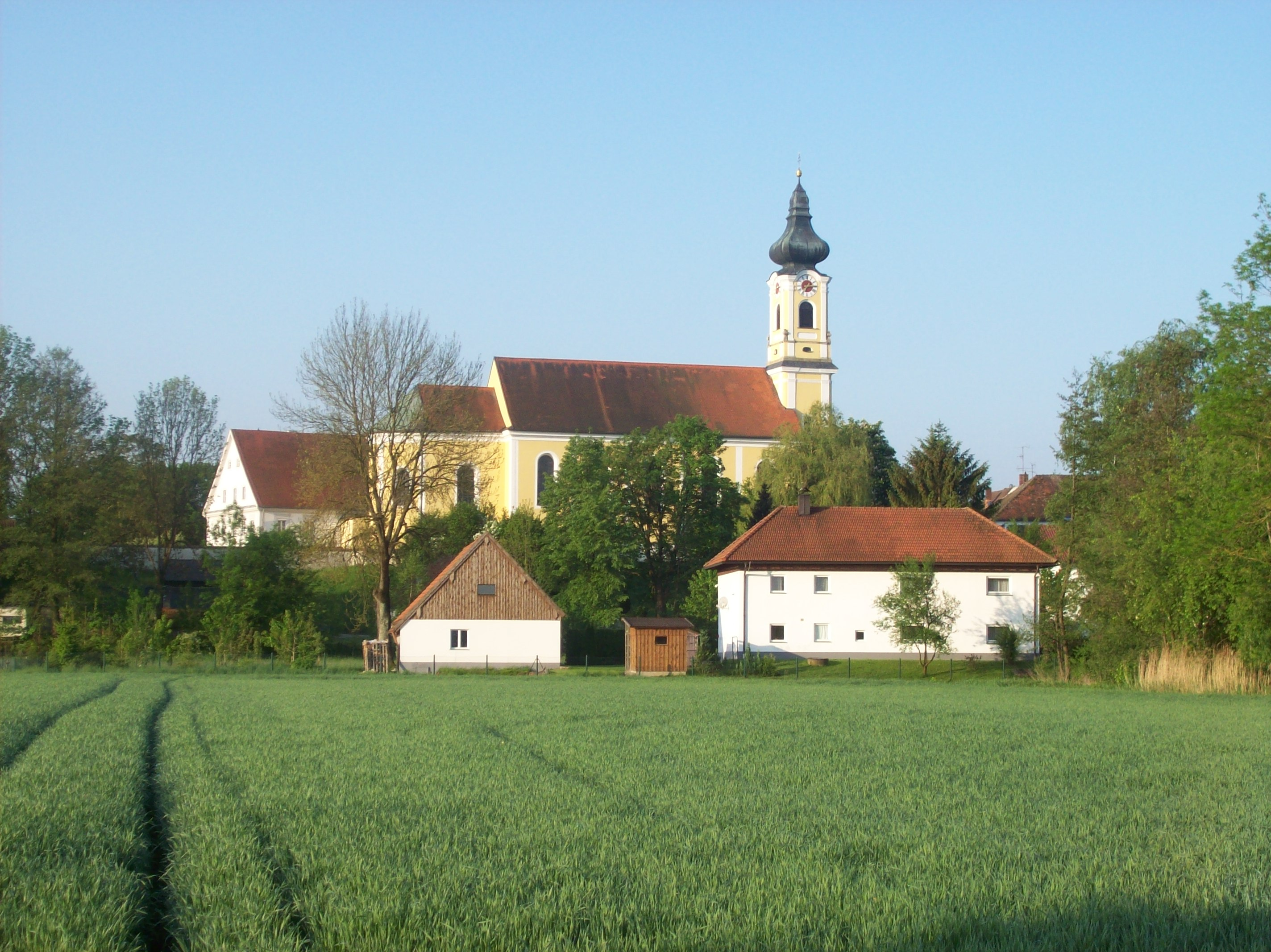
- Stephansposching seen from the north

- Coat of arms

- Location of Stephansposching within Deggendorf district
- Interactive map of Stephansposching
- Location within Germany Location within Bavaria
- Coordinates: 48°49′N 12°48′E
- Country: Germany
- State: Bavaria
- Admin. region: Niederbayern
- District: Deggendorf

Government
  - Mayor (2020–26): Jutta Staudinger (CSU)

Area
  - Total: 44.67 km^{2} (17.25 sq mi)
- Elevation: 325 m (1,066 ft)

Population (2025-12-31)
  - Total: 3,202
  - Density: 71.68/km^{2} (185.7/sq mi)
- Time zone: UTC+01:00 (CET)
  - Summer (DST): UTC+02:00 (CEST)
- Postal codes: 94569
- Dialling codes: 09935
- Vehicle registration: DEG
- Website: www.stephansposching.de

Stephansposching is a municipality in the district of Deggendorf in Bavaria in Germany.
