= Ehrgott Bernhard Bendl =

German sculptor

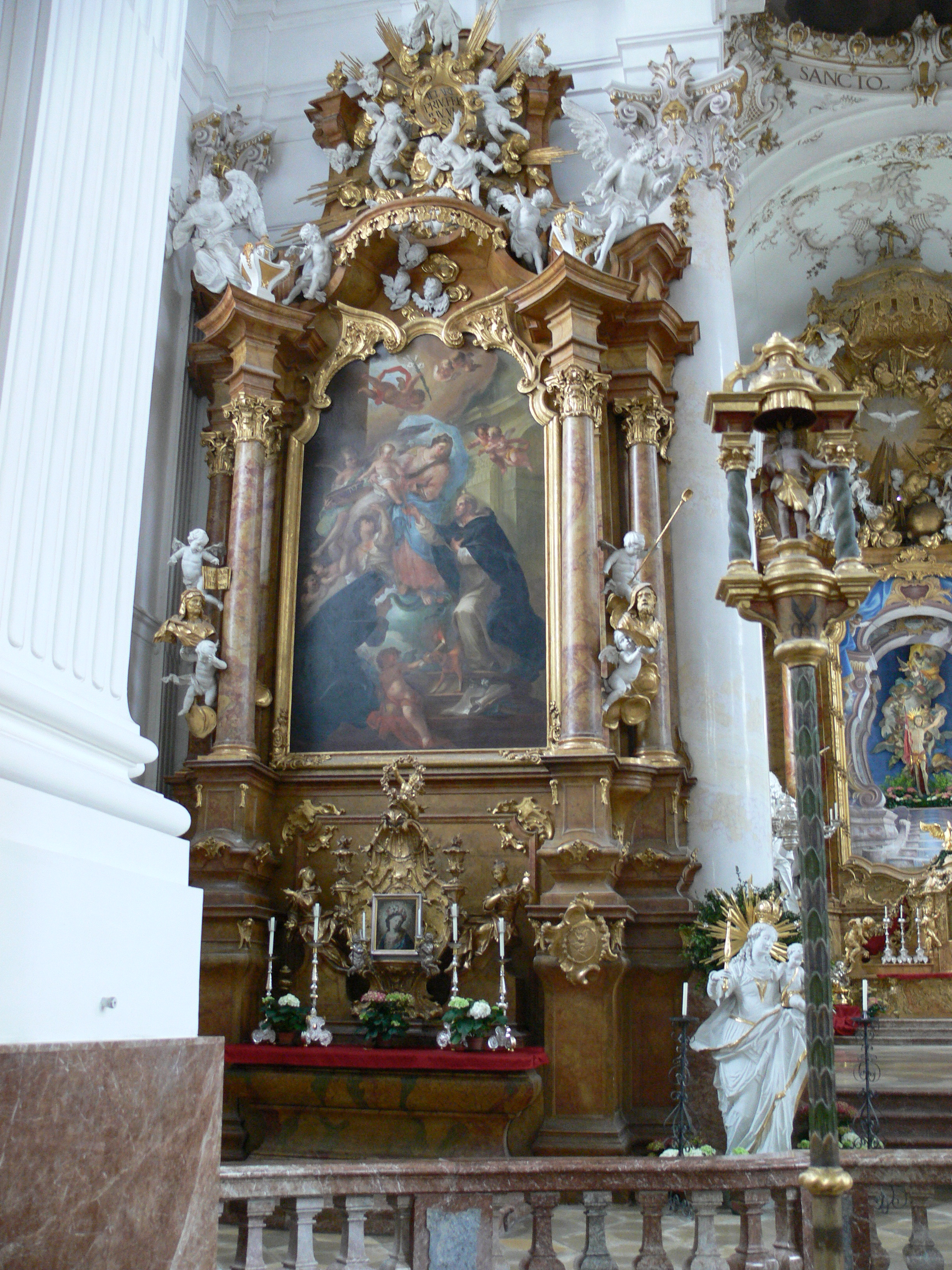
The Rosenkranzaltar in the Marienmünster church.

Ehrgott or Ehregott Bernhard Bendl, Bendel, Pendel or Pendl (c.1660, Pfarrkirchen - 31 January 1738, Augsburg) was a German sculptor and plaster-worker. He worked in southern Germany and Switzerland in stone, wood, gold, silver, plaster, metal and ivory.

== Life ==
His father was the sculptor Johann Christoph Bendl, who was in turn the brother of the sculptor Jakob Bendl. He was probably trained in his father's studio until 1678. He then spent six years travelling, visiting Prague, Vienna, Rome and Paris. At that time there was a Johann Georg Bendl in Prague and an Ignaz Innocent Bendl in Vienna, both working as sculptors and both possibly relations of Johann's - he might have trained in their studios on his travels. From 1684 to 1687 he worked in Johann Jakob Rill's studio in Augsburg. He began work in his own right in 1687 and became one of the leading sculptors in Augsburg, holding posts in its guild of sculptors.

== Bibliography ==
- (in German) Ehrgott Bernhard Bendl. In: Allgemeines Künstlerlexikon. Die Bildenden Künstler aller Zeiten und Völker (AKL). Band 13, Saur, München u. a. 1996, ISBN 3-598-22753-1, S. 630ff
- Hertha Lünenschloss (1955). "Bendl, Ehrgott Bernhard". Neue Deutsche Biographie (in German). Vol. 2. Berlin: Duncker & Humblot. pp. 40–41. (full text online).
