= Seebach (Ismaning) =

River in Germany

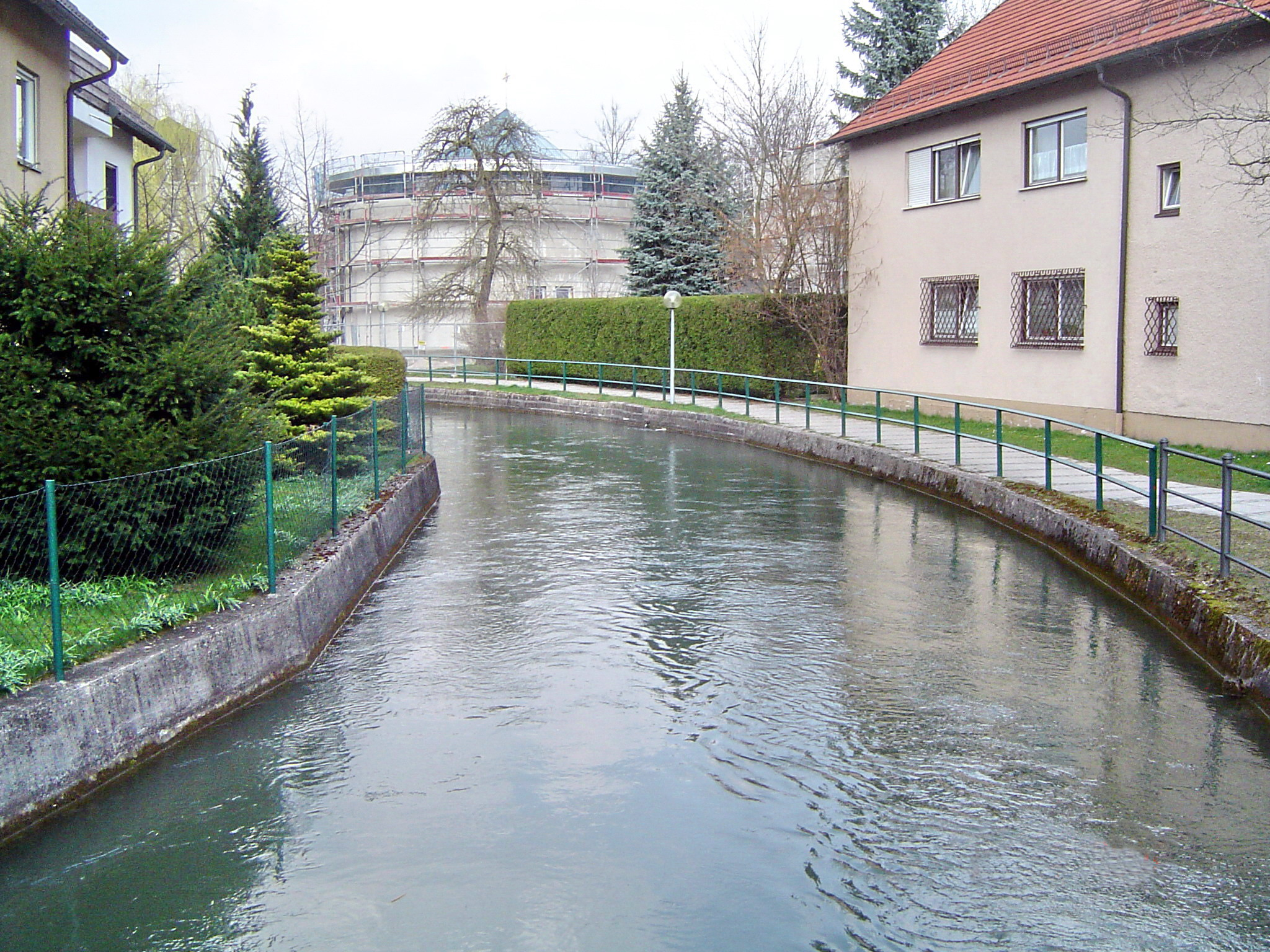
- The Seebach in Ismaning

Location
- Country: Germany
- State: Bavaria

Physical characteristics
- Source
  - location: near the Mittlere-Isar-Kanal
- Mouth
  - location: Isar at Ismaning
  - coordinates: 48.2333°N 11.6703°E

Basin features
- Progression: Isar→ Danube→ Black Sea

Seebach (German pronunciation: [ˈzeːbax]) is a river in Ismaning, Bavaria, Germany. The origin of the Seebach is near the Mittlere-Isar-Kanal. It flows through Ismaning and enters the Isar from the right.

== See also ==
- List of rivers of Bavaria
