= Bavarian Senate =

Corporative upper chamber of Bavaria's parliamentary system from 1946 to 1999

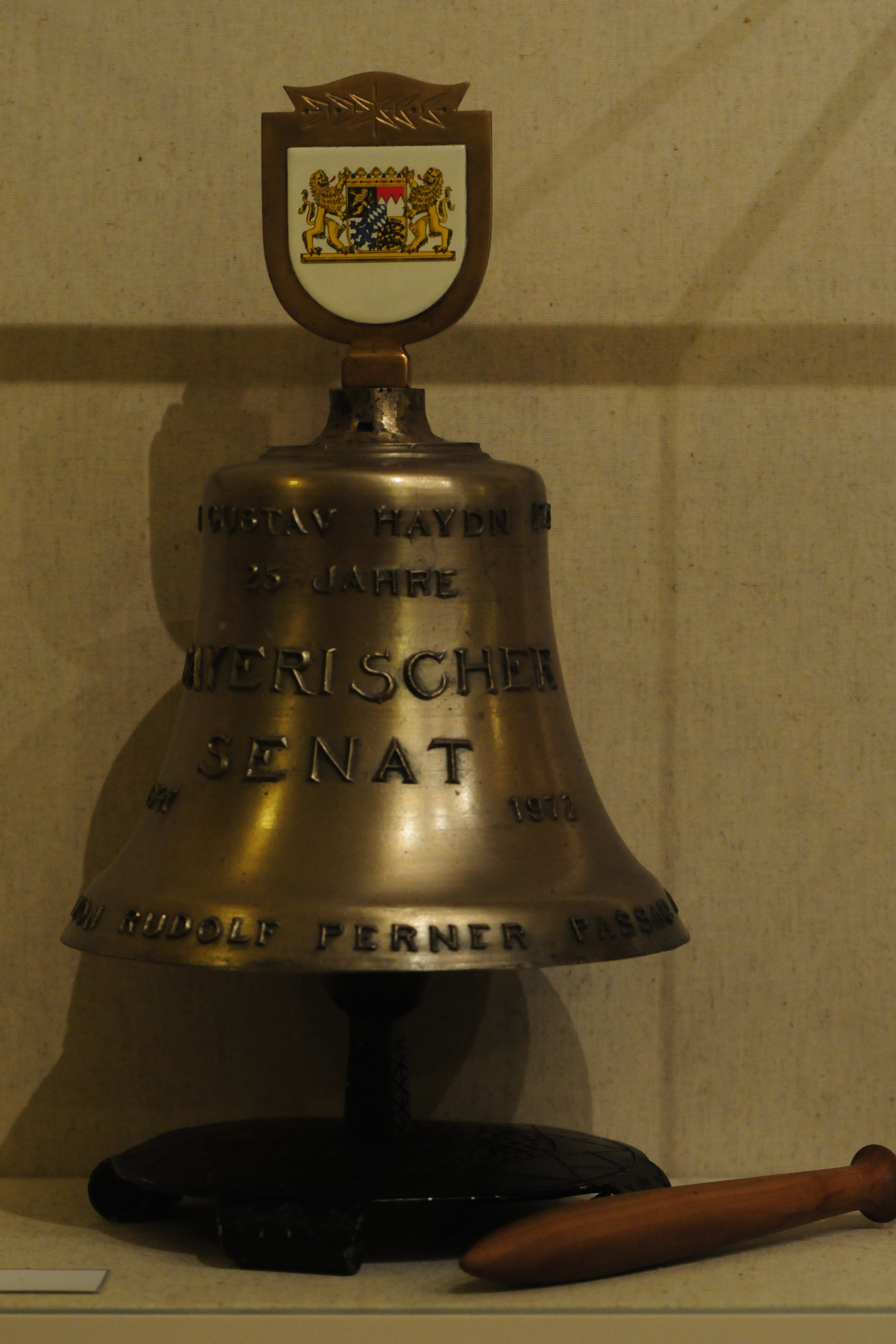
The Senate Bell

The Bavarian Senate (German Bayerischer Senat) was the corporative upper chamber of Bavaria's parliamentary system from 1946 to 1999, when it was abolished by a popular vote (referendum) changing the Constitution of Bavaria.

== Composition ==
The 60 members of the Senate had to be at least 40 years of age and could not be a member of the Landtag (the other and more important chamber of the Bavarian parliament). Every other year, a third of the Senate's members would be elected by corporations representing social, economic, municipal or cultural groups or appointed by religious denominations for a term of six years. The number of seats representing each group was fixed by the constitution of Bavaria:

- 11 representatives of agriculture or forestry
- 5 representatives of industry and commerce
- 5 representatives of craftsmen
- 11 representatives of unions
- 4 representatives of professions
- 5 representatives of cooperatives
- 5 representatives of religious denominations
- 5 representatives of social welfare organisations
- 3 representatives of universities and colleges
- 6 representatives of municipalities and municipal associations

Internationally, the Senate's composition was similar to the Vocational panels in the Irish senate. It also bore remnants of council-democratic ideas.

== Role ==
The Senate's main role was consulting other state institutions and delivering legal opinion. It also had the power to delay state legislation passed by the Landtag within a month (one week for urgent acts). However, the Landtag could overturn the veto by a simple majority, the same majority required to pass a law in the first place.

== Criticism and dissolution ==
In the 1990s, public opinion in Germany turned towards leaner government. The Senate, because it was essentially powerless, was regarded by many as an unnecessary expenditure.

In June 1997, a popular initiative petition sponsored by the Ecological Democratic Party gained 927,047 signatures (10.5% of those entitled to vote). In the following referendum on 8 February 1998, which yielded a turnout of 39.9%, a majority of 69.2% voted for the law amending the State Constitution to abolish the Senate. A counter-proposal by the ruling Christian Social Union, which would have changed the composition of the Senate, only received 23.6%.

On 1 January 2000, the law abolishing the Senate came into effect.

== Presidents of the Senate of Bavaria ==
Name	Period
Josef Singer	1947–1967
Hippolyt Baron Poschinger of Frauenau	1968–1982
Hans Weiß	1982–1993
Walter Schmitt Glaeser	1994–1996
Heribert Thallmair	1996–1999

== See also ==
- House of Councillors (Bavaria)
- Politics of Bavaria
- History of Bavaria
