= Ismaning =

- Municipality
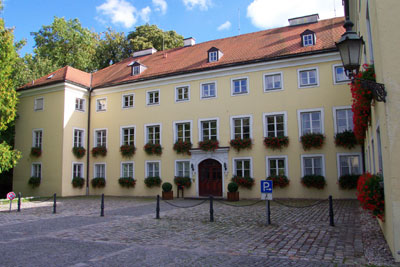
- Ismaning Palace, serving currently as town hall

- Coat of arms

- Location of Ismaning within Munich district
- Interactive map of Ismaning
- Location within Germany Location within Bavaria
- Coordinates: 48°13′35″N 11°40′21″E
- Country: Germany
- State: Bavaria
- Admin. region: Oberbayern
- District: Munich

Government
  - Mayor (2020–26): Alexander Greulich (SPD)

Area
  - Total: 40.19 km^{2} (15.52 sq mi)
- Elevation: 490 m (1,610 ft)

Population (2025-12-31)
  - Total: 18,038
  - Density: 448.8/km^{2} (1,162/sq mi)
- Time zone: UTC+01:00 (CET)
  - Summer (DST): UTC+02:00 (CEST)
- Postal codes: 85737
- Dialling codes: 089
- Vehicle registration: M
- Website: ismaning.de

Ismaning (German pronunciation: [ˈɪsmanɪŋ]) is a municipality in Bavaria, Germany, located near Munich.

== Geography ==
In 2016 it had 16,770 inhabitants. The town is located about seven kilometers northeast of Munich on the right high bank of the Isar River that flows into the Danube. Near Ismaning there is a large broadcasting facility called Transmitter Ismaning. The river Seebach running through the centre of the town features many different types of freshwater fish.

== History ==
The year 809 saw the first documentary mention. 1319 there was a sale of the villages of Ismaning, Unterföhring, Oberföhring, Englschalking and Daglfing to the Hochstift Freising by the Duke of Bavaria and later Emperor Ludwig the Bavarian in exchange for "a hundred March lotrings silver". This created the county on the Yserrain which existed until 1802. Then Ismaning became part of the Kingdom of Bavaria. Ismaning Palace was seat of the Beauharnais family until 1851 and is now seat of the town hall.

== Economy and infrastructure ==
=== Economy ===
Originally an agricultural community, Ismaning has been known as an important media location since the mid-1990s. The Bavarian Broadcasting Corporation's Ismaning transmitter has been located to the northeast of the village since 1932. To the south is the media park with Sport1 Medien AG (Sport1), Gong-Verlag, Mainstream Media AG (Heimatkanal) and the private radio station Antenne Bayern.

=== Traffic ===
Due to its location near Munich, Ismaning is well connected. Ismaning is located on the railroad line Munich East-Munich Airport, the Bundesautobahn 99, the Federal roads B 471, B 388 and B 301 as well as on the State road 2053 (Freising-Ismaning-Unterföhring-Munich).

The S8 line of the Munich S-Bahn connects Ismaning with Munich every 20 minutes.

== Famous buildings ==
This center of Ismaning is characterized by the Catholic parish church of St. Johann Baptist. It is located to the south of Ismaning Palace (with castle park and former farm buildings), which was reconstructed by Leo von Klenze.
