= Mettmann II =

Federal electoral district of Germany

104 Mettmann II
- Electoral district for the Bundestag
- Mettmann II in 2025
- State: North Rhine-Westphalia
- Population: 216,700 (2019)
- Electorate: 160,175 (2021)
- Major settlements: Ratingen; Velbert; Heiligenhaus
- Area: 223.4 km^{2}

Current electoral district
- Created: 1965
- Party: CDU
- Member: Peter Beyer
- Elected: 2009, 2013, 2017, 2021, 2025

Mettmann II is an electoral constituency (German: Wahlkreis) represented in the Bundestag. It elects one member via first-past-the-post voting. Under the current constituency numbering system, it is designated as constituency 104. It is located in western North Rhine-Westphalia, comprising the northern part of the district of Mettmann.

Mettmann II was created for the 1965 federal election. Since 2009, it has been represented by Peter Beyer of the Christian Democratic Union (CDU).

== Geography ==
Mettmann II is located in western North Rhine-Westphalia. As of the 2021 federal election, it comprises the municipalities of Heiligenhaus, Ratingen, Velbert, and Wülfrath from the district of Mettmann.

== History ==
Mettmann II was created in 1965 and contained parts of the redistributed Düsseldorf-Mettmann constituency. Until acquiring its current name in 1980, it was known as Düsseldorf-Mettmann II. From 1965 through 1976, it was constituency 72 in the numbering system. From 1980 through 1998, it was number 73. From 2002 through 2009, it was number 106. In the 2013 through 2021 elections, it was number 105. From the 2025 election, it has been number 104.

Originally, the constituency comprised the municipalities of Ratingen, Velbert, Heiligenhaus, Kettwig, Langenberg, Neviges, Wittlaer, Ratingen-Lintorf, and Hubbelrath, as well as the Amt of Angerland, from the district of Düsseldorf-Mettmann. It acquired its current borders in the 1980 election.

Election	No.	Name	Borders
1965	72	Düsseldorf-Mettmann II	Düsseldorf-Mettmann district (only Ratingen, Velbert, Heiligenhaus, Kettwig, Langenberg, Neviges, Wittlaer, Ratingen-Lintorf, and Hubbelrath municipalities and Angerland Amt)
1969	72	Düsseldorf-Mettmann II	Düsseldorf-Mettmann district (only Ratingen, Velbert, Heiligenhaus, Kettwig, Langenberg, Neviges, Wittlaer, Ratingen-Lintorf, and Hubbelrath municipalities and Angerland Amt)
1972	72	Düsseldorf-Mettmann II	Düsseldorf-Mettmann district (only Ratingen, Velbert, Heiligenhaus, Kettwig, Langenberg, Neviges, Wittlaer, Ratingen-Lintorf, and Hubbelrath municipalities and Angerland Amt)
1976	72	Düsseldorf-Mettmann II	Düsseldorf-Mettmann district (only Ratingen, Velbert, Heiligenhaus, Kettwig, Langenberg, Neviges, Wittlaer, Ratingen-Lintorf, and Hubbelrath municipalities and Angerland Amt)
1980	73	Mettmann II	Mettmann district (only Heiligenhaus, Ratingen, Velbert, and Wülfrath municipalities)
1983	73	Mettmann II	Mettmann district (only Heiligenhaus, Ratingen, Velbert, and Wülfrath municipalities)
1987	73	Mettmann II	Mettmann district (only Heiligenhaus, Ratingen, Velbert, and Wülfrath municipalities)
1990	73	Mettmann II	Mettmann district (only Heiligenhaus, Ratingen, Velbert, and Wülfrath municipalities)
1994	73	Mettmann II	Mettmann district (only Heiligenhaus, Ratingen, Velbert, and Wülfrath municipalities)
1998	73	Mettmann II	Mettmann district (only Heiligenhaus, Ratingen, Velbert, and Wülfrath municipalities)
2002	106	Mettmann II	Mettmann district (only Heiligenhaus, Ratingen, Velbert, and Wülfrath municipalities)
2005	106	Mettmann II	Mettmann district (only Heiligenhaus, Ratingen, Velbert, and Wülfrath municipalities)
2009	106	Mettmann II	Mettmann district (only Heiligenhaus, Ratingen, Velbert, and Wülfrath municipalities)
2013	105	Mettmann II	Mettmann district (only Heiligenhaus, Ratingen, Velbert, and Wülfrath municipalities)
2017	105	Mettmann II	Mettmann district (only Heiligenhaus, Ratingen, Velbert, and Wülfrath municipalities)
2021	105	Mettmann II	Mettmann district (only Heiligenhaus, Ratingen, Velbert, and Wülfrath municipalities)
2025	104	Mettmann II	Mettmann district (only Heiligenhaus, Ratingen, Velbert, and Wülfrath municipalities)

== Members ==
The constituency was first represented by Willi Müser of the Christian Democratic Union (CDU) from 1965 to 1969. He was succeeded by Heinz Pensky of the Social Democratic Party (SPD). Heinz Schemken of the CDU was elected in 1983 and represented the constituency until 1998, when the SPD regained it. Regina Schmidt-Zadel held it for a single term before being succeeded by Kerstin Griese in the 2002 election. In 2009, Peter Beyer of the CDU became representative. He was re-elected in 2013, 2017, 2021, and 2025.

Election	Member	Party	%
1965	Willi Müser	CDU	46.4
1969	Heinz Pensky	SPD	48.0
1972	Heinz Pensky	SPD	53.5
1976	Heinz Pensky	SPD	46.5
1980	Heinz Pensky	SPD	48.3
1983	Heinz Schemken	CDU	49.6
1987	Heinz Schemken	CDU	49.0
1990	Heinz Schemken	CDU	49.4
1994	Heinz Schemken	CDU	47.9
1998	Regina Schmidt-Zadel	SPD	46.8
2002	Kerstin Griese	SPD	45.3
2005	Kerstin Griese	SPD	43.5
2009	Peter Beyer	CDU	39.8
2013	Peter Beyer	CDU	45.6
2017	Peter Beyer	CDU	39.3
2021	Peter Beyer	CDU	31.3
2025	Peter Beyer	CDU	35.9

== Election results ==
=== 2025 election ===
Federal election (2025): Mettmann II
Notes:	Blue background denotes the winner of the electorate vote. Pink background denotes a candidate elected from their party list. Yellow background denotes an electorate win by a list member, or other incumbent. A ✓ or ✗ denotes status of any incumbent, win or lose respectively.						
Party	Candidate	Votes	%	±%	Party votes	%	±%
CDU	✓ Peter Beyer	46,152	35.9	▲4.5	41,357	32.0	▲5.0
SPD	Kerstin Greise	32,169	25.0	▼5.7	25,094	19.4	▼8.6
AfD	Hans Ulrich	22,097	17.2	▲9.9	21,731	16.8	▲9.4
Greens	Ophelia Nick	14,237	11.1	▼3.4	14,517	11.2	▼3.5
Left	Birgit Onori	8,542	6.6	▲3.9	9,159	7.1	▲3.9
BSW					5,533	4.3	
FDP	Alexander Steffen	5,007	3.9	▼5.2	6,817	5.3	▼7.9
Tierschutzpartei					1,767	1.4	0.0
Volt					837	0.6	▲0.4
PARTEI				▼1.8	728	0.6	▼0.5
FW				▼1.0	500	0.3	▼0.2
MLPD	Horst Dotten	422	0.3	▲0.2	76	0.1	0.0
PdF					249	0.2	▲0.2
Team Todenhöfer					241	0.2	▼0.5
dieBasis				▼1.1	225	0.2	▼0.8
BD					129	0.1	
Values					80	0.1	
MERA25					55	0.0	
Pirates							▼0.5
Gesundheitsforschung							▼0.1
Bündnis C				▼0.2			▼0.1
Humanists							▼0.1
ÖDP							▼0.1
SGP						0.0	0.0
Informal votes		1,221			752		
Total valid votes		128,626			129,095		
Turnout		129,847	82.8	▲5.5			
CDU hold	Majority	13,983	10.9				

=== 2021 election ===
Federal election (2021): Mettmann II
Notes:	Blue background denotes the winner of the electorate vote. Pink background denotes a candidate elected from their party list. Yellow background denotes an electorate win by a list member, or other incumbent. A ✓ or ✗ denotes status of any incumbent, win or lose respectively.						
Party	Candidate	Votes	%	±%	Party votes	%	±%
CDU	✓ Peter Beyer	38,429	31.3	▼7.9	33,254	27.1	▼5.6
SPD	Kerstin Greise	37,635	30.7	▲0.5	34,409	28.0	▲3.5
Greens	Ophelia Nick	17,730	14.5	▲8.4	18,112	14.7	▲7.8
FDP	Jessica Denné-Weiß	11,158	9.1	▲0.4	16,235	13.2	▼2.6
AfD	Jessica Malisch	8,894	7.3	▼1.7	9,104	7.4	▼2.2
Left	Birgit Onori	3,395	2.8	▼2.7	3,887	3.2	▼3.6
Tierschutzpartei					1,656	1.3	▲0.4
PARTEI	Mario De Falco	2,258	1.8		1,293	1.1	▲0.4
dieBasis	Editha Roetger	1,366	1.1		1,210	1.0	
Team Todenhöfer					851	0.7	
FW	Mario Sülz	1,166	1.0		759	0.6	▲0.4
Pirates					613	0.5	0.0
Volt					312	0.3	
Gesundheitsforschung					183	0.1	▲0.1
Bündnis C	Marcel Stubbe	221	0.2		154	0.1	
Independent	Jason Richter	181	0.1				
LfK					152	0.1	
LIEBE					138	0.1	
NPD					109	0.1	▼0.1
Humanists					85	0.1	0.0
V-Partei3					82	0.1	0.0
ÖDP					79	0.1	0.0
MLPD	Horst Dotten	99	0.1		59	0.0	0.0
du.					58	0.0	
LKR	Andrea Konorza	65	0.1		37	0.0	
PdF					34	0.0	
SGP					15	0.0	0.0
DKP					12	0.0	0.0
Informal votes		1,172			877		
Total valid votes		122,597			122,892		
Turnout		123,769	77.3	▲0.4			
CDU hold	Majority	794	0.6	▼8.4			

=== 2017 election ===
Federal election (2017): Mettmann II
Notes:	Blue background denotes the winner of the electorate vote. Pink background denotes a candidate elected from their party list. Yellow background denotes an electorate win by a list member, or other incumbent. A ✓ or ✗ denotes status of any incumbent, win or lose respectively.						
Party	Candidate	Votes	%	±%	Party votes	%	±%
CDU	✓ Peter Beyer	48,689	39.3	▼6.3	40,601	32.6	▼8.7
SPD	Kerstin Griese	37,468	30.2	▼6.9	30,492	24.5	▼6.4
AfD	Bernd Ulrich	11,143	9.0	▲5.8	11,926	9.6	▲4.9
FDP	Anna-Tina Pannes	10,795	8.7	▲6.3	19,691	15.8	▲9.7
Greens	Nick Ophelia	7,567	6.1	▲1.2	8,599	6.9	0.0
Left	Rainer Köster	6,825	5.5	▲1.2	8,458	6.8	▲1.3
Tierschutzpartei					1,186	1.0	
PARTEI					822	0.7	▲0.4
Pirates	Frank Herrmann	1,451	1.2	▼1.3	630	0.5	▼1.7
AD-DEMOKRATEN					493	0.4	
FW					294	0.2	▲0.1
NPD					252	0.2	▼0.7
DM					140	0.1	
V-Partei³					126	0.1	
DiB					121	0.1	
ÖDP					122	0.1	0.0
Gesundheitsforschung					118	0.1	
Volksabstimmung					114	0.1	▼0.1
BGE					98	0.1	
MLPD					73	0.1	0.0
Die Humanisten					56	0.0	
Independent	Dirk Willing	48	0.0				
DKP					15	0.0	
SGP					13	0.0	0.0
Informal votes		1,510			1,056		
Total valid votes		123,986			124,440		
Turnout		125,496	76.9	▲3.5			
CDU hold	Majority	11,221	9.1	▲0.6			

=== 2013 election ===
Federal election (2013): Mettmann II
Notes:	Blue background denotes the winner of the electorate vote. Pink background denotes a candidate elected from their party list. Yellow background denotes an electorate win by a list member, or other incumbent. A ✓ or ✗ denotes status of any incumbent, win or lose respectively.						
Party	Candidate	Votes	%	±%	Party votes	%	±%
CDU	✓ Peter Beyer	55,307	45.6	▲5.7	50,254	41.3	▲7.5
SPD	Kerstin Griese	45,091	37.1	▲1.5	37,580	30.9	▲3.9
Greens	Michael Remmert	5,987	4.9	▼2.0	8,408	6.9	▼2.4
Left	Serdar Boztemur	5,166	4.3	▼2.7	6,646	5.5	▼2.6
AfD	Christiane Geb	3,911	3.2		5,730	4.7	
Pirates	Gabriel Heinzmann-Jiménez	2,997	2.5		2,655	2.2	▲0.6
FDP	Jörg Weisse	2,920	2.4	▼6.9	7,421	6.1	▼10.8
NPD					1,097	0.9	0.0
PARTEI					347	0.3	
PRO					245	0.2	
Volksabstimmung					212	0.2	▲0.1
FW					197	0.2	
REP					197	0.2	▼0.2
Nichtwahler					176	0.1	
ÖDP					147	0.1	0.0
BIG					96	0.1	
Party of Reason					74	0.1	
RRP					55	0.0	▼0.1
Die Rechte					39	0.0	
MLPD					31	0.0	0.0
BüSo					26	0.0	0.0
PSG					21	0.0	0.0
Informal votes		1,657			1,382		
Total valid votes		121,379			121,654		
Turnout		123,036	74.3	▲1.5			
CDU hold	Majority	10,216	4.2	▲4.3			

=== 2009 election ===
Federal election (2009): Mettmann II
Notes:	Blue background denotes the winner of the electorate vote. Pink background denotes a candidate elected from their party list. Yellow background denotes an electorate win by a list member, or other incumbent. A ✓ or ✗ denotes status of any incumbent, win or lose respectively.						
Party	Candidate	Votes	%	±%	Party votes	%	±%
CDU	Peter Beyer	48,276	39.8	▼1.8	40,999	33.8	▼1.6
SPD	✗ Kerstin Griese	43,173	35.6	▼7.8	32,740	27.0	▼11.7
FDP	Dirk Wedel	11,332	9.4	▲4.0	20,574	16.9	▲5.1
Greens	Mareike Grigo	8,447	7.0	▲3.1	11,350	9.3	▲2.8
Left	Martin Behnke	8,418	6.9	▲2.2	9,839	8.1	▲3.1
Pirates					1,955	1.6	
NPD	Markus Born	1,503	1.2	▲0.3	1,061	0.9	▲0.2
Tierschutzpartei					756	0.6	▲0.2
FAMILIE					596	0.5	▲0.1
REP					467	0.4	0.0
RENTNER					422	0.3	
RRP					199	0.2	
Volksabstimmung					122	0.1	0.0
ÖDP					95	0.1	
Centre					94	0.1	0.0
DVU					84	0.0	
BüSo					28	0.0	0.0
MLPD					28	0.0	0.0
PSG					20	0.0	0.0
Informal votes		1,541			1,261		
Total valid votes		121,149			121,429		
Turnout		122,690	72.9	▼6.6			
CDU gain from SPD	Majority	5,103	4.2				

=== 2005 election ===
Federal election (2005): Mettmann II
Notes:	Blue background denotes the winner of the electorate vote. Pink background denotes a candidate elected from their party list. Yellow background denotes an electorate win by a list member, or other incumbent. A ✓ or ✗ denotes status of any incumbent, win or lose respectively.						
Party	Candidate	Votes	%	±%	Party votes	%	±%
SPD	✓ Kerstin Griese	58,157	43.5	▼1.8	5,750	38.6	▼2.8
CDU	Ewald Muchhouse	55,728	41.7	▲1.0	47,366	35.3	▼0.5
FDP	Detlef Parr	7,120	5.3	▼1.8	15,867	11.8	▲0.9
Left	Klaus Jann	6,321	4.7	▲3.6	6,668	4.9	▲3.7
Greens	Alfons Kuhles	5,188	3.9	▼0.5	8,806	6.6	▼1.5
NPD	Ralf-Peter Zecher	1,246	0.9		885	0.7	▲0.2
GRAUEN					632	0.5	▲0.2
Tierschutzpartei					597	0.4	▲0.1
Familie					487	0.4	▲0.2
REP					474	0.4	
PBC					161	0.1	
From Now on... Democracy Through Referendum					129	0.1	
MLPD					61	0.0	
Socialist Equality Party					60	0.0	
Centre					46	0.0	
BüSo					27	0.0	0.0
Informal votes		1,476			1,220		
Total valid votes		133,760			134,016		
Turnout		135,236	79.4	▼2.2			
SPD hold	Majority	2,429	1.8				
