= Straubing (electoral district) =

Federal electoral district of Germany

230 Straubing
- Electoral district for the Bundestag
- Straubing in 2025
- State: Bavaria
- Population: 226,300 (2019)
- Electorate: 172,562 (2025)
- Major settlements: Straubing; Regen; Bogen
- Area: 2,244.0 km^{2}

Current electoral district
- Created: 1949
- Party: CSU
- Member: Alois Rainer
- Elected: 2013, 2017, 2021, 2025

Straubing is an electoral constituency (German: Wahlkreis) represented in the Bundestag. It elects one member via first-past-the-post voting. Under the current constituency numbering system, it is designated as constituency 230. It is located in southeastern Bavaria, comprising the city of Straubing and the districts of Regen and Straubing-Bogen.

Straubing was created for the inaugural 1949 federal election. Since 2013, it has been represented by Alois Rainer of the Christian Social Union (CSU).

== Geography ==
Straubing is located in southeastern Bavaria. As of the 2021 federal election, it comprises the independent city of Straubing and the districts of Regen and Straubing-Bogen.

== History ==
Straubing was created in 1949. In the 1949 election, it was Bavaria constituency 17 in the numbering system. In the 1953 through 1961 elections, it was number 212. In the 1965 through 1972 elections, it was number 216. In the 1976 through 1998 elections, it was number 217. In the 2002 and 2005 elections, it was number 232. In the 2009 through 2021 elections, it was number 231. From the 2025 election, it has been number 230.

Originally, the constituency comprised the independent city of Straubing and the districts of Landkreis Straubing, Bogen, Dingolfing, and Mallersdorf. In the 1965 through 1972 elections, it also contained the district of Landau an der Isar. It acquired its current borders in the 1976 election.

Election	No.	Name	Borders
1949	17	Straubing	Straubing city; Landkreis Straubing district; Bogen district; Dingolfing district; Mallersdorf district
1953	212	Straubing	Straubing city; Landkreis Straubing district; Bogen district; Dingolfing district; Mallersdorf district
1957	212	Straubing	Straubing city; Landkreis Straubing district; Bogen district; Dingolfing district; Mallersdorf district
1961	212	Straubing	Straubing city; Landkreis Straubing district; Bogen district; Dingolfing district; Mallersdorf district
1965	216	Straubing	Straubing city; Landkreis Straubing district; Bogen district; Dingolfing district; Mallersdorf district; Landau an der Isar district
1969	216	Straubing	Straubing city; Landkreis Straubing district; Bogen district; Dingolfing district; Mallersdorf district; Landau an der Isar district
1972	216	Straubing	Straubing city; Landkreis Straubing district; Bogen district; Dingolfing district; Mallersdorf district; Landau an der Isar district
1976	217	Straubing	Straubing city; Regen district; Straubing-Bogen district
1980	217	Straubing	Straubing city; Regen district; Straubing-Bogen district
1983	217	Straubing	Straubing city; Regen district; Straubing-Bogen district
1987	217	Straubing	Straubing city; Regen district; Straubing-Bogen district
1990	217	Straubing	Straubing city; Regen district; Straubing-Bogen district
1994	217	Straubing	Straubing city; Regen district; Straubing-Bogen district
1998	217	Straubing	Straubing city; Regen district; Straubing-Bogen district
2002	232	Straubing	Straubing city; Regen district; Straubing-Bogen district
2005	232	Straubing	Straubing city; Regen district; Straubing-Bogen district
2009	231	Straubing	Straubing city; Regen district; Straubing-Bogen district
2013	231	Straubing	Straubing city; Regen district; Straubing-Bogen district
2017	231	Straubing	Straubing city; Regen district; Straubing-Bogen district
2021	231	Straubing	Straubing city; Regen district; Straubing-Bogen district
2025	230	Straubing	Straubing city; Regen district; Straubing-Bogen district

== Members ==
The constituency has been held by the Christian Social Union (CSU) during all but one Bundestag term since its creation. It was first represented by Johann Wartner of the Bavaria Party (BP) from 1949 to 1953. Josef Lermer of the CSU won it in 1953 and served until 1965. Alois Rainer (born 1921) was then representative from 1965 to 1983. Ernst Hinsken then served from 1983 to 2013, a total of eight consecutive terms. Alois Georg Rainer, son of former representative Alois Rainer, was elected in 2013, and re-elected in 2017, 2021, and 2025.

Election	Member	Party	%
1949	Johann Wartner	BP	33.8
1953	Josef Lermer	CSU	52.2
1957	Josef Lermer	CSU	60.4
1961	Josef Lermer	CSU	67.3
1965	Alois Rainer	CSU	68.8
1969	Alois Rainer	CSU	66.6
1972	Alois Rainer	CSU	64.7
1976	Alois Rainer	CSU	69.2
1980	Alois Rainer	CSU	67.2
1983	Ernst Hinsken	CSU	71.3
1987	Ernst Hinsken	CSU	68.0
1990	Ernst Hinsken	CSU	63.6
1994	Ernst Hinsken	CSU	63.6
1998	Ernst Hinsken	CSU	63.0
2002	Ernst Hinsken	CSU	74.6
2005	Ernst Hinsken	CSU	68.0
2009	Ernst Hinsken	CSU	55.4
2013	Alois Rainer	CSU	61.2
2017	Alois Rainer	CSU	47.6
2021	Alois Rainer	CSU	44.3
2025	Alois Rainer	CSU	46.3

== Election results ==
=== 2025 election ===
Federal election (2025): Straubing
Notes:	Blue background denotes the winner of the electorate vote. Pink background denotes a candidate elected from their party list. Yellow background denotes an electorate win by a list member, or other incumbent. A ✓ or ✗ denotes status of any incumbent, win or lose respectively.						
Party	Candidate	Votes	%	±%	Party votes	%	±%
CSU	Alois Georg Josef Rainer	65,291	46.3	▲2.0	55,427	39.3	▲3.9
AfD	Yannic Elias Liebl	36,671	26.0	▲13.3	39,113	27.7	▲14.6
FW	Helmut Michael Muhr	11,139	7.9	▼3.5	11,127	7.9	▼5.6
SPD	Marvin Kliem	11,133	7.9	▼4.5	11,321	8.0	▼7.1
Greens	Feride Niedermeier	7,241	5.1	▼1.4	7,466	5.3	▼1.5
Left	Johannes Jürgen Spielbauer	4,394	3.1	▲1.7	4,934	3.5	▲1.6
FDP	Klaus Eugen Herpel	2,715	1.9	▼3.3	4,279	3.0	▼5.7
BSW					4,124	2.9	
ÖDP	Michael Ludwig Hirtreiter	1,877	1.3	▼0.5	896	0.6	▼0.3
APT					883	0.6	▼0.3
PARTEI					368	0.3	▼0.4
Volt					355	0.3	▲0.2
dieBasis					314	0.2	▼0.8
BP					297	0.2	▼0.5
BD	Eva Marie Born	482	0.3		144	0.1	
Humanists					53	0.0	Steady
MLPD					17	0.0	Steady
Informal votes		629			454		
Total valid votes		140,943			141,118		
Turnout		141,572	82.0	▲5.5			
CSU hold	Majority	28,880	20.3	▼11.3			

=== 2021 election ===
Federal election (2021): Straubing
Notes:	Blue background denotes the winner of the electorate vote. Pink background denotes a candidate elected from their party list. Yellow background denotes an electorate win by a list member, or other incumbent. A ✓ or ✗ denotes status of any incumbent, win or lose respectively.						
Party	Candidate	Votes	%	±%	Party votes	%	±%
CSU	✓ Alois Rainer	58,487	44.3	▼3.3	46,742	35.3	▼6.5
AfD	Corinna Miazga	16,794	12.7	▼2.3	17,402	13.2	▼5.2
SPD	Dennis Schötz	16,312	12.4	▼4.5	19,938	15.1	▲1.4
FW	Helmut Muhr	15,115	11.4	▲6.9	17,869	13.5	▲9.3
Greens	Erhard Grundl	8,613	6.5	▲2.9	8,964	6.8	▲2.2
FDP	Klaus Herpel	6,895	5.2	▲0.8	11,603	8.8	▲0.7
ÖDP	Michael Hirtreiter	2,467	1.9	▼0.3	1,271	1.0	▼0.3
Left	Maximilian Spielbauer	1,936	1.5	▼2.3	2,468	1.9	▼2.5
PARTEI	Marco Schmipfhauser	1,506	1.1		892	0.7	▲0.3
dieBasis	Tobias Huf	1,503	1.1		1,397	1.1	
Tierschutzpartei					1,214	0.9	▲0.2
BP	Thomas Schmid	1,294	1.0	▼1.1	958	0.7	▼0.6
Independent	Thomas Knott	586	0.4				
Team Todenhöfer	Johann Janik	570	0.4		275	0.2	
Pirates					250	0.2	0.0
Unabhängige					212	0.2	
NPD					160	0.1	▼0.3
Volt					123	0.1	
V-Partei3					111	0.1	0.0
Gesundheitsforschung					104	0.1	0.0
The III. Path					97	0.1	
Humanists					70	0.1	
Bündnis C					41	0.0	
du.					36	0.0	
LKR					25	0.0	
DKP					15	0.0	0.0
MLPD					6	0.0	0.0
Informal votes		877			712		
Total valid votes		132,078			132,243		
Turnout		132,955	76.5	▲2.1			
CSU hold	Majority	41,693	31.6	▲0.8			

=== 2017 election ===
Federal election (2017): Straubing
Notes:	Blue background denotes the winner of the electorate vote. Pink background denotes a candidate elected from their party list. Yellow background denotes an electorate win by a list member, or other incumbent. A ✓ or ✗ denotes status of any incumbent, win or lose respectively.						
Party	Candidate	Votes	%	±%	Party votes	%	±%
CSU	✓ Alois Rainer	60,976	47.6	▼13.6	53,712	41.9	▼15.9
SPD	Johanna Ueckermann	21,525	16.8	▼0.8	17,512	13.7	▼2.4
AfD	Manfred Kleinschwärzer	19,261	15.1	▲11.7	23,576	18.4	▲14.4
FW	Tobias Beck	5,875	4.6	▲1.1	5,410	4.2	▲0.4
FDP	Mathias Baur	5,670	4.4	▲2.1	10,308	8.0	▲3.8
Left	Tobias Beck	4,766	3.7	▲1.2	5,590	4.4	▲1.4
Greens	Erhard Grundl	4,602	3.6	▲0.3	5,846	4.6	▲0.6
ÖDP	Michael Klaus	2,749	2.1	▼0.8	1,647	1.3	▼0.5
BP	Manuel Schindlbeck	2,626	2.1		1,700	1.3	▲0.1
Tierschutzpartei					946	0.7	▲0.1
NPD					583	0.5	▼0.9
PARTEI					441	0.3	
Pirates					281	0.2	▼1.3
DM					164	0.1	
V-Partei³					149	0.1	
Gesundheitsforschung					122	0.1	
DiB					95	0.1	
BGE					86	0.1	
MLPD					19	0.0	0.0
DKP					15	0.0	
BüSo					7	0.0	0.0
Informal votes		1,374			1,215		
Total valid votes		128,050			128,209		
Turnout		129,424	74.4	▲10.2			
CSU hold	Majority	39,451	30.8	▼12.8			

=== 2013 election ===
Federal election (2013): Straubing
Notes:	Blue background denotes the winner of the electorate vote. Pink background denotes a candidate elected from their party list. Yellow background denotes an electorate win by a list member, or other incumbent. A ✓ or ✗ denotes status of any incumbent, win or lose respectively.						
Party	Candidate	Votes	%	±%	Party votes	%	±%
CSU	Alois Rainer	67,579	61.2	▲5.8	63,887	57.8	▲7.6
SPD	Johanna Uekermann	19,400	17.6	▼4.9	17,790	16.1	▲1.9
FW	Markus Achatz	3,820	3.5		4,171	3.8	
AfD	Markus Arthur Hesse	3,662	3.3		4,375	4.0	
Greens	Gaby Englmeier	3,582	3.2	▼0.7	4,324	3.9	▼1.4
ÖDP	Michael Klaus Röder	3,201	2.9	▲0.2	1,939	1.8	▼0.8
Left	Dietmar Kuschke	2,757	2.5	▼2.4	3,297	3.0	▼3.5
FDP	Florian Weinzierl	2,596	2.4	▼5.4	4,653	4.2	▼9.5
Pirates	Walter Weber	1,915	1.7		1,627	1.5	▲0.1
NPD	Sascha Roßmüller	1,858	1.7	▼0.6	1,513	1.4	▼0.5
BP					1,390	1.3	▲0.2
Tierschutzpartei					688	0.6	▲0.1
REP					377	0.3	▼0.8
DIE FRAUEN					191	0.2	
Party of Reason					138	0.1	
DIE VIOLETTEN					81	0.1	▼0.1
PRO					59	0.1	
RRP					19	0.0	▼0.5
MLPD					16	0.0	0.0
BüSo					14	0.0	▼0.1
Informal votes		1,167			988		
Total valid votes		110,370			110,549		
Turnout		111,537	64.2	▼0.9			
CSU hold	Majority	48,179	43.6	▲10.6			

=== 2009 election ===
Federal election (2009): Straubing
Notes:	Blue background denotes the winner of the electorate vote. Pink background denotes a candidate elected from their party list. Yellow background denotes an electorate win by a list member, or other incumbent. A ✓ or ✗ denotes status of any incumbent, win or lose respectively.						
Party	Candidate	Votes	%	±%	Party votes	%	±%
CSU	✓ Ernst Hinsken	61,572	55.4	▼12.6	55,844	50.1	▼9.4
SPD	Michael Adam	24,922	22.4	▲2.5	15,817	14.2	▼6.4
FDP	Philipp Frankenfeld	8,650	7.8	▲4.4	15,232	13.7	▲6.3
Left	Dietmar Kuschke	5,410	4.9	▲1.9	7,257	6.5	▲3.1
Greens	Erhard Grundl	4,372	3.9	▲0.9	5,925	5.3	▲2.0
ÖDP	Florian Fahrner	3,040	2.7		2,831	2.5	
NPD	Sascha Roßmüller	2,519	2.3	▼0.4	2,085	1.9	▼0.2
Pirates					1,526	1.4	
REP					1,258	1.1	▼0.2
BP					1,232	1.1	▲0.3
FAMILIE					772	0.7	▼0.1
Tierschutzpartei					629	0.6	
Independent	Harald Kanneder	602	0.5				
RRP					534	0.5	
DIE VIOLETTEN					171	0.2	
CM					93	0.1	
PBC					69	0.1	0.0
DVU					47	0.1	
BüSo					28	0.0	0.0
MLPD					13	0.0	0.0
Informal votes		1,621			1,345		
Total valid votes		111,087			111,363		
Turnout		112,708	65.1	▼8.6			
CSU hold	Majority	36,650	33.0	▼15.1			

=== 2005 election ===
Federal election (2005):Straubing
Notes:	Blue background denotes the winner of the electorate vote. Pink background denotes a candidate elected from their party list. Yellow background denotes an electorate win by a list member, or other incumbent. A ✓ or ✗ denotes status of any incumbent, win or lose respectively.						
Party	Candidate	Votes	%	±%	Party votes	%	±%
CSU	✓ Ernst Hinsken	85,192	68.0	▼6.6	74,793	59.5	▼12.8
SPD	Herbert Schreiner	24,953	19.9	▲1.0	25,931	20.6	▲1.7
FDP	Franz Prockl	4,210	3.4	▲0.5	9,272	7.4	▲4.6
Greens	Erhard Grundl	3,813	3.0	▼0.5	4,184	3.3	▲0.4
Left	Bernd Irmler	3,731	3.0		4,292	3.4	▲3.1
NPD	Franz Salzberger	3,390	2.7		2,627	2.1	▲1.7
REP					1,660	1.3	▲0.7
Familie					1,019	0.8	
BP					980	0.8	▲0.6
Feminist					369	0.3	▲0.2
GRAUEN					330	0.3	▲0.2
PBC					129	0.1	▲0.1
BüSo					52	0.0	0.0
MLPD					48	0.0	
Informal votes		1,975			1,578		
Total valid votes		125,289			125,686		
Turnout		127,264	73.7	▼5.3			
CSU hold	Majority	60,239	48.1				
