= Kerstin Griese =

German politician (born 1966)

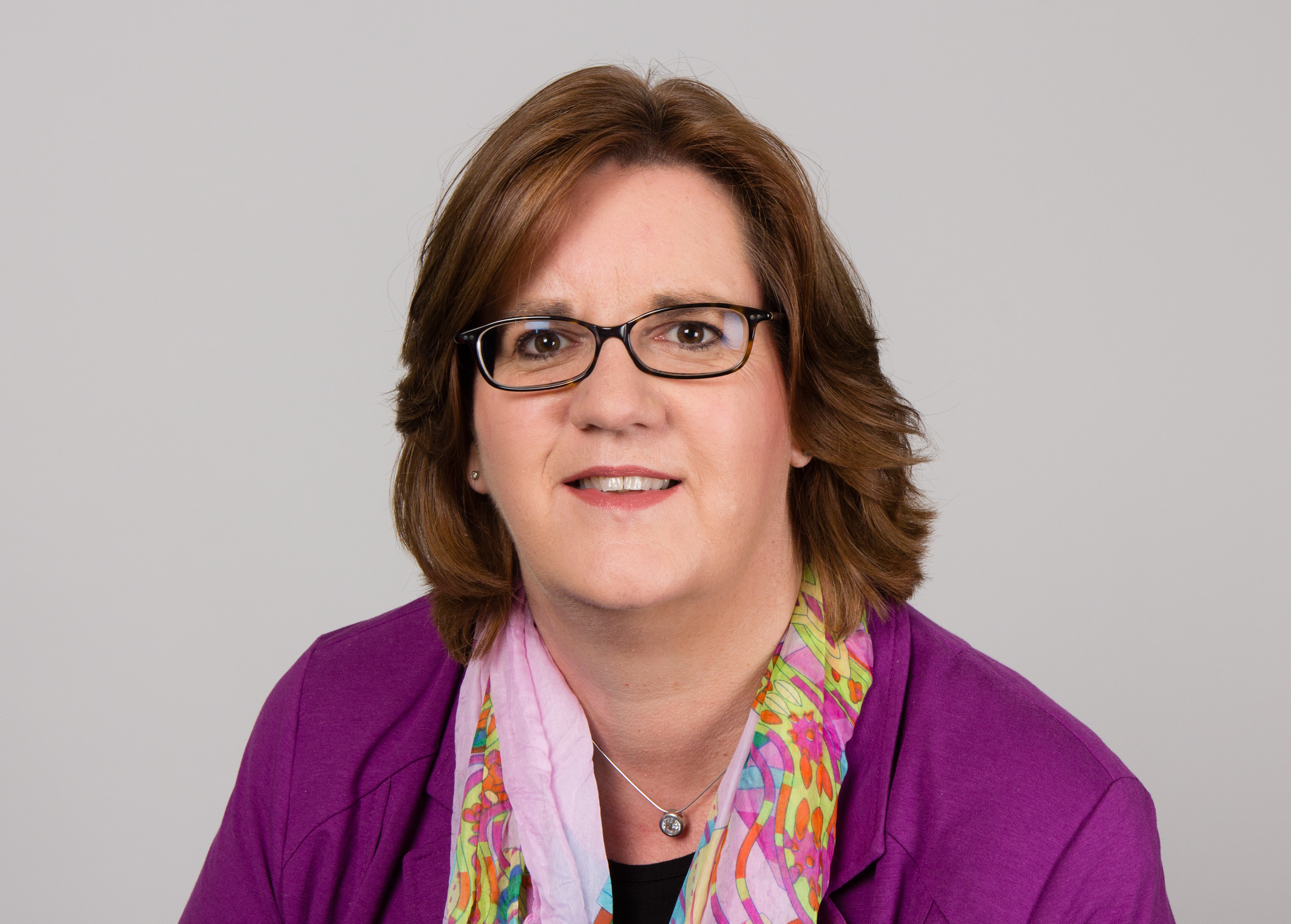

Member of the Bundestag
- Incumbent
- Assumed office 2000

Personal details
- Born: 6 December 1966 (age 59) Münster, West Germany
- Citizenship: German
- Party: SPD
- Education: Heinrich Heine University

Kerstin Griese (born December 1966 in Münster) is a German politician of the Social Democratic Party (SPD) who has been serving as a member of the German Bundestag since 2000.

In addition to her parliamentary work, Griese has been serving Parliamentary State Secretary to the Federal Minister of Labor and Social Affairs in the governments of Chancellors Angela Merkel, Olaf Scholz and Friedrich Merz since 2018. She also belongs to the Council of the Evangelical Church in Germany (EKD).

== Education and profession ==
Video presentation (2014)

The daughter of a pastor, Griese grew up and went to school in Gerbrunn (in Lower Franconia, Bavaria) and in Düsseldorf. After graduating from high school in 1985, she completed a degree in Modern and Eastern European History, as well as in political science, at the Heinrich Heine University in Düsseldorf, which she finished in 1997 with an M. A. (Magistra Artium) degree.

From 1987 to 1997, Griese worked first as a freelancer, and then until 2000 as a research associate, at the Memorial for the Victims of National Socialism in Düsseldorf.

== Political career ==
Since 1986, Griese has been a member of the SPD and was initially involved in the Juso-Hochschulgruppe Düsseldorf. From 1989 to 1990, she was president of the AStA, and from 1990 to 1992 president of the student parliament, of the Heinrich Heine University. From 1989 to 1993, she was a member of the Federal Coordinating Committee (Federal Board) of the Juso-Hochschulgruppen, which she also represented in the Juso Federal Board. From 1994 to 1997, she was Deputy Chairwoman of the Lower Rhine Jusos. She was considered a representative of the undogmatic-reform socialist wing of the Jusos.

From 1995 to 2011 and since 2013 she has been a member of the Federal Executive of the SPD. From 1996 to 1999 she was chairwoman of the Youth Commission of the SPD Executive Board, from 2006 to 2011 she was a member of the leadership of the Forum Kinder und Familie and the steering group of Zukunftswerkstatt Familie. Since 2008, she is spokeswoman for the working group Christians in the SPD and district chairwoman of the SPD in Kreis Mettmann.

=== Member of the German Parliament, 2000–present ===
On 11 May 2000 Griese entered the Bundestag as a successor for the departed MP Willfried Penner. In the 2002 general election, she was elected directly with 45.3% of the first votes for the federal constituency Mettmann II (Heiligenhaus, Ratingen, Velbert and Wülfrath). In 2005, she was re-elected with 43.5% of the first votes. In 2009, she only received 35.6% of the first votes and was not elected. On 23 July 2010 she reentered the Bundestag after Angelica Schwall-Düren was appointed State Minister for Federal Affairs, Europe and Media in the state government of North Rhine-Westphalia. In the 2013 general election, she received 37.1%, and in 2017, 30.6% of the first votes. In each case, she entered the parliament via the SPD state list.

In parliament, Griese chaired the Committee on Family, Senior Citizens, Women and Youth from 2002 to 2009. Within her parliamentary group, she was speaker of the group of young delegates - "Youngsters" - in the SPD parliamentary group from 2001 to 2002., and was a member of the SPD Group Bureau. From 2006 to 2009 and from 2011 to 2018, she was SPD parliamentary group representative for churches and religious organizations. From 2014 to 2018, she was chairwoman of the Committee on Labor and Social Affairs. She is a member of the progressive-reformist Network Berlin.

=== Parliamentary State Secretary, 2018–present ===
In the negotiations to form a coalition government under the leadership of Chancellor Angela Merkel following the 2017 federal elections, Griese was part of the working group on social affairs, led by Karl-Josef Laumann, Barbara Stamm and Andrea Nahles.

On 14 March 2018 Hubertus Heil appointed Griese as Parliamentary State Secretary to the Federal Minister of Labor and Social Affairs.

== Church and Diakonie ==
From 1979 to 1989, Griese was active in the youth work of the Protestant parish Düsseldorf-Urdenbach and in the church district of Düsseldorf. From 1987 to 1989 she was a youth delegate to the Synod of the Evangelical Church in Germany (EKD) and the Evangelical Church in the Rhineland.

From 2001 to 2016 she was a deputy member of the Synod of the Protestant Church in the Rhineland. Since 2003, she has been a member of the EKD synod, which she previously served as a deputy member for six years. In 2015 she was elected to the church leadership, the 15-member council of the EKD.

From 2009 to 2010, she worked as a full-time federal executive member of the Diakonisches Werk of the EKD, responsible for social policy.

== Other activities ==
- Workers' Samaritan Foundation Germany (ASB), vice-president (2006–2009, 2011–2018)
- Gegen Vergessen – Für Demokratie, Member of the Board (since 2010)
- German Coordinating-Council for Christian-Jewish Cooperation Organizations, Member
- IG Bergbau, Chemie, Energie (IG BCE), Member
- Leo Baeck Foundation, Member of the Board of Trustees
- Willy Brandt Center Jerusalem, CO-Founder

== Political positions ==
=== Childcare ===
Griese argues for conditions that enable German women to have "children, work, career and success". She stated "The birth rate is highest in Europe, where the female employment rate is high and childcare is well regulated." She continued stating that for that reason, the federal government was investing billions in childcare and parental benefits.

She criticized the current German tax regulations for married couples, whose benefits she wants to limit. To her, it is absurd that "forty percent of couples who benefit from spousal splitting do not need to support children."

In the question of child protection, Griese had spoken in favor of compulsory pediatric examinations for all children, with the goal of detecting health problems early. To her, it represents "a building block for the protection of the children."

In the revision of the Pregnancy Conflict Law on the issue of medical indications for abortion and late termination, Griese presented a lead bill of her own, which contradicted the majority opinion of the SPD parliamentary group. Together with Katrin Göring-Eckardt (Greens) and Andrea Nahles (SPD), she pleaded for a binding reflection period, as well as a commitment of the doctor to mediate in a consultation and to establish contacts with disability organizations. The draft submitted by Griese and others largely corresponded to the law finally passed by the Bundestag.

As a rapporteur, Griese played a key role in the inclusion of video games in the Protection of Young Persons Act and worked on the age classification for video games. Saying, "A pure prohibition policy is no use," she turned against demands to ban so-called "killer games." Griese criticized that the federal government annually provides 300,000 euros for the Deutscher Computerspielpreis, while the board games do not receive similar funding for their game of the year award, saying, "The alternative to the digital computer game can also be an analog board and card game. Perhaps it would be good to pay tribute to this segment of culture."

=== Abolition of conscription ===
Griese had campaigned for an abolition of conscription, and thus for alternative civilian service for conscientious objectors. She wanted to ensure that the funds released were invested in the Voluntary Social Year and that the emergence of a new voluntary culture among young people was encouraged. She had criticized the creation of the Federal Volunteer Service as "impractical," saying, "Anyone who intervenes in the structure of volunteer services will destroy a lot."

=== Religious affairs ===
Griese missed "real progress for ecumenism in practice" in the relationship between the Christian churches because, in her words, "Rome denies the Protestant Christians an encounter on an equal footing." She criticized that the Pope "conveys an unworldliness that contradicts my Christian understanding of an inviting faith," and the fact that she sees "a lot of exclusion in the Catholic Church."

Griese advocated the preservation and reform of the church labor law. She appealed to the churches to accept workers' right to strike and to exclude diaconal companies that "are the 'black sheep' because they use outsourcing and temporary contracts to cut their costs." She called for a universally binding labor contract for the social sector, so that "especially private providers cannot continue to depress wages."

Griese, together with Michael Brand (CDU/CSU) and other MPs of all parliamentary groups, had written a group petition providing for a ban on commercial suicide assistance. "My job is to stop the activities of assisted suicide groups or individuals who intentionally and deliberately make suicide assistance a regular subject of their activity," said Griese. She warned, "Death on prescription, with an invoice number, could become the norm in the country." The Brand/Griese bill prevailed over three other cross-party motions by a majority of 360 out of 602 votes.

Griese complained that there is still no proper Islamic religious education in schools for the majority of Muslim students, stating that, "For a successful integration, there must first be offers." To Griese, as long as Islamic religious studies are not offered nationwide, it would be inevitable for many Muslim families to resort to the offers of the mosque associations.

== Publications ==
- Kerstin Griese: Düsseldorf-Grafenberg – Psychiatrische Klinik der Akademie und Heil- und Pflegeanstalt. In: Michael G. Esch, Kerstin Griese, Frank Sparing, Wolfgang Woelk (Hrsg.): Die Medizinische Akademie Düsseldorf im Nationalsozialismus. Klartext, Essen 1997, ISBN 3-88474-568-9, S. 228–265.
- Kerstin Griese: Die Zionistische Bewegung in Düsseldorf – von einer aktiven Minderheit zur wichtigen Auswanderungsinstanz. In: Angela Genger, Kerstin Griese (Redaktion): Aspekte jüdischen Lebens in Düsseldorf und am Niederrhein. Mahn- und Gedenkstätte, Düsseldorf 1997, ISBN 3-9805963-1-1, S. 142–155.
- Kerstin Griese, Wolfgang Woelk: Jüdische Ärztinnen und Ärzte in Düsseldorf und in der Emigration. In: Kurt Düwell, Angela Genger, Kerstin Griese, Falk Wiesemann (Hrsg.): Vertreibung jüdischer Künstler und Wissenschaftler aus Düsseldorf 1933–1945. Droste, Düsseldorf 1998, ISBN 3-7700-1097-3, S. 177–205.
- Angela Genger, Kerstin Griese: Entwicklungen und Veränderungen in der pädagogischen Arbeit der Gedenkstätten in Nordrhein-Westfalen. In: Angela Genger, Kerstin Griese (Redaktion): Forschen – Lernen – Gedenken – Bildungsangebote für Jugendliche und Erwachsene in den Gedenkstätten für die Opfer des Nationalsozialismus in NRW. Arbeitskreis NS-Gedenkstätten NW, Düsseldorf 1998, S. 7–17.
- Kerstin Griese: Arbeit mit Zeitzeuginnen und Zeitzeugen in der Mahn- und Gedenkstätte Düsseldorf. In: Angela Genger, Kerstin Griese (Redaktion): Forschen – Lernen – Gedenken – Bildungsangebote für Jugendliche und Erwachsene in den Gedenkstätten für die Opfer des Nationalsozialismus in NRW. Arbeitskreis NS-Gedenkstätten NW, Düsseldorf 1998, S. 86–93
- Kerstin Griese: Opfer von Zwangssterilisierungen und NS-"Euthanasie" in der Rheinprovinz – eine didaktische Arbeitshilfe mit Dokumenten, Bildern und Texten für Schule und Bildungsarbeit. Mahn- und Gedenkstätte, Düsseldorf 2001, ISBN 3-9807674-0-X.
- Kerstin Griese, Rolf Stöckel: Ein "Mehr" desselben führt zu nichts – unsere Kritik am Status quo des Sozialstaates. In: Die neue SPD – Menschen stärken – Wege öffnen. J.H.W. Dietz Nachf., Bonn 2004, ISBN 3-8012-0345-X, S. 249–253.
- Kerstin Griese, Harald Schrapers: Perspektiven für Kinder – auf die Kleinsten kommt es an. In: Hubertus Heil, Juliane Seifert (Hrsg.): Soziales Deutschland – für eine neue Gerechtigkeitspolitik. VS, Wiesbaden 2005, ISBN 3-531-14798-6, S. 103–112.
- Kerstin Griese: Vorsorge statt Nachsorge – das neue SPD-Grundsatzprogramm, der Sozialstaat und die evangelische Kirche. In: Zeitzeichen – Evangelische Kommentare zu Religion und Gesellschaft. Dezember 2006, S. 43–49
- Kerstin Griese, Nicolette Kressl: Bessere Chancen durch individuelle Förderung – Für ein kinderfreundliches Land muss ein Rad ins andere greifen. In: Matthias Platzeck, Frank-Walter Steinmeier, Peer Steinbrück (Hrsg.): Auf der Höhe der Zeit. Vorwärts Buch, Berlin 2007, ISBN 3-86602-629-3, S. 89–93.
- Kerstin Griese, Harald Schrapers: Gute Chancen für alle Kinder – Materielle Umverteilung ist nicht genug. In: Berliner Republik. 1/2008, S. 34–38.
- Kerstin Griese, Harald Schrapers: Malefiz mit Digitalisten – Computerspiele machen dick, dumm und gewalttätig. In: Berliner Republik. 3/2009, S. 62–65.
- Kerstin Griese, Harald Schrapers: Der lange Abschied vom Zivildienst – Mit der De-facto-Abschaffung des Wehrdienstes fällt auch der Zivildienst. In: Berliner Republik. 4/2010, S. 80–82.
- Kerstin Griese: Gute Pflege, guter Lohn – Plädoyer für einen Branchentarif Gesundheit und Soziales. In: Zeitzeichen – Evangelische Kommentare zu Religion und Gesellschaft. September 2013, S. 39–41.
- Kerstin Griese: Das kirchliche Arbeitsrecht und die Perspektiven für soziale Arbeit. In: Franz Maget (Hrsg.): Kirche und SPD. Volk Verlag, München 2014, ISBN 978-3-86222-147-9, S. 157–170
- Kerstin Griese, Harald Schrapers: Die spannende Vorgeschichte eines Jubiläums – In diesem Jahr feiern wir das 50. Jubiläum der Aufnahme diplomatischer Beziehungen zwischen Deutschland und Israel. In: Berliner Republik. 6/2015, S. 75–77.
- Kerstin Griese, Harald Schrapers: Religion im 500. Jahr der Reformation – Der Ablasshandel ist Geschichte, die großen religionspolitischen Herausforderungen betreffen nicht mehr die Verständigung zwischen Katholiken und Protestanten. In: Berliner Republik. 6/2016, S. 48–50.
- Kerstin Griese, Harald Schrapers: Gründungsgeschichte – 20 Jahre Willy-Brandt-Zentrum. In: Partner for Peace. Willy-Brandt-Zentrum Jerusalem, Berlin 2017, S. 9–11.
- Kerstin Griese, Harald Schrapers: Ein hochpolitisches Jahrzehnt – Von der Weltpolitik zur Sozialberatung. In: Philipp Breder u. a. (Hrsg.): Studium, StuPa, Streik! Die Juso-Hochschulgruppen und ihre Geschichte. Schüren, Marburg 2018, ISBN 978-3-7410-0261-8, S. 48–52.
