= Ernst Hinsken =

Former member of the Bundestag

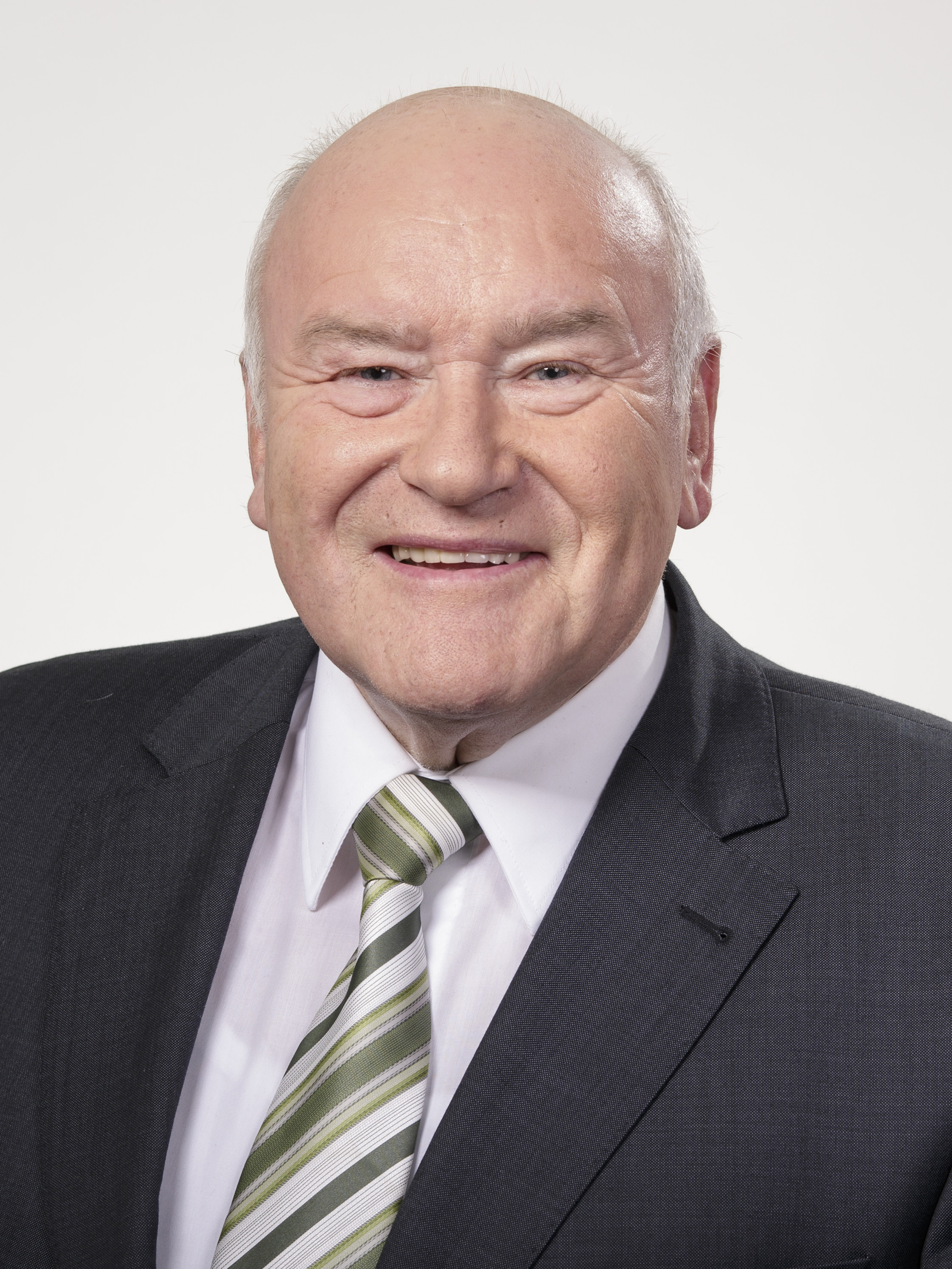
- Hinsken in 2012

Parliamentary State Secretary for Food, Agriculture and Forestry
- In office 15 January 1998 – 26 October 1998
- Minister: Jochen Borchert
- Preceded by: Wolfgang Gröbl
- Succeeded by: Gerald Thalheim

Member of the Bundestag; from Bavaria
- In office 4 November 1980 – 22 October 2013
- Preceded by: Alois Rainer Sr.
- Succeeded by: Alois Rainer Jr.
- Constituency: State list (1980–1983); Straubing (1983–2013)

Personal details
- Born: 5 February 1943 Plattling, Germany
- Died: 30 August 2020 (aged 77) Regensburg, Germany
- Party: Christian Social Union
- Children: 2
- Committees: Committee on Economic Affairs and Technology, Committee on Tourism, German-Egyptian Parliamentary Group, Parliamentary Group for Small and Medium-Sized Enterprises, Subcommittee on Regional Economic Policy, Executive Committee of the CSU Parliamentary Group
- Awards: Bavarian Order of Merit, Federal Cross of Merit, State Medal for Special Services to the Bavarian Economy, Golden Ring of Honor of German Crafts, Municipal Medal of Merit in Silver, Constitutional Medal in Silver

Ernst Hinsken (5 February 1943 – 30 August 2020) was a German politician and member of the Bundestag from 1980 to 2013 representing the Christian Social Union in Bavaria (CSU). He trained as a baker and worked in his family business for much of his early life, but entered politics in the early 1970s. Hinsken joined the Young Union in 1967 and became a member of the CSU's Lower Bavaria district executive committee in 1972. He was a member of the Straubing-Bogen district council from 1972 until 2020.

Hinsken was elected to the Bundestag in 1980, and served until 2013. From January to October 1998, Hinsken was the Parliamentary State Secretary for Food, Agriculture and Forestry. He chaired two parliamentary committees and one sub-committee during his career, and was the first deputy chairman of the CDU/CSU's Parliamentary Group for Small and Medium-Sized Businesses. Hinsken was the longest-serving CSU member of the Bundestag and the longest-serving councillor in Straubing-Bogen.

== Early life ==
Ernst Hinsken was born on 5 February 1943 in Plattling, Deggendorf district, Bavaria. After graduating from gymnasium, he took evening classes and private lessons at a business school. Hinsken's family owned a baking business, and he took apprenticeships in confectionery and baking before completing a master's examination in 1964. He worked at various businesses before taking over his family bakery a few years later.

== Local politics ==
Even during his time as a professional baker, Hinsken had been passionate for politics, with a close friend later saying of him that he "only had politics on his mind". He joined the CSU, the Union parties' branch in Bavaria, in 1967. He served from 1972 to 1978 as the first district chairman of the local Young Union, during which time the organisation grew from 80 members to 720. Hinsken became a member of the CSU's district executive committee for Lower Bavaria in 1972.

In 1972, Hinsken joined the Straubing-Bogen district council following a district reform. He became the district chairman in 1985 and would serve on the council until spring 2020. In 1995, Hinsken was named deputy chairman of the CSU's district association in Lower Bavaria.

Hinsken ran unsuccessfully for a seat in the Landtag in the 1978 Bavarian state election.

== Bundestag ==
Hinsken ran in the 1980 West German election for the CSU and was elected on the state list. From 1983, he was directly elected to the Bundestag for the Straubing constituency. This was his first time running for a federal election. Early in his parliamentary career, Hinsken was an advocate for small businesses as a member of the so-called "flour faction" of bakers and millers in parliament. In the Bundestag he continued this, serving as deputy chairman of the Parliamentary Group for Small and Medium-Sized Enterprises until his retirement in 2013. From 1990 to 1997, Hinsken was the CDU/CSU parliamentary group's economic and transportation policy spokesperson. On 15 January 1998, he was appointed as Parliamentary State Secretary to the Federal Minister of Food, Agriculture and Forestry. However, he was removed from his position on 26 October 1998 after the federal election and the swearing-in of the first Schröder cabinet.

While Hinsken served as the CSU economic spokesperson, he also served as chairman representing the CDU/CSU in the Committee for Economic Affairs, as well as chairman of the Sub-Committee on Regional Economic Policy. From November 1998 to December 2005, Hinsken chaired the Committee on Tourism, and he would later become the Federal Government Commissioner for Tourism from 2005 to 2007. He was a member of the executive committee of the CDU/CSU parliamentary group from 2002 to 2005 and again from 2009 to 2013. In 2009, Hinsken was named chairman of the Committee on Economic Affairs and Technology, succeeding Eduard Oswald.

In 2002, Hinsken smuggled a red lantern into the Bundestag to raise awareness of Germany's economic crisis, intending to present it to Gerhard Schröder, who was Chancellor of Germany at the time. He had wanted to bring attention to how Germany was lagging behind the rest of Europe economically. After hearing about the idea in a CSU state group meeting, he had brought an antique red railway lantern from his constituency of Straubing. The lantern was intended to symbolise the back of a train. Originally, Michael Glos, head of the CDU/CSU parliamentary group at the time, had intended to present the lantern during a debate on the annual economic report. However, Glos was uncomfortable with the idea and decided against it, leaving Hinsken to bring it into the Bundestag. Hinsken attempted to present the lantern to the government bench during a speech by Werner Müller. As a result of the incident, he was reprimanded by President of the Bundestag Wolfgang Thierse. The lantern was later moved to the House of History in Bonn.

Hinsken played a major part in the organisation of the 2008 Franco-German summit, held in Straubing. He had convinced Chancellor Angela Merkel to hold the summit in his constituency, over the wishes of then-French President Nicolas Sarkozy. Hinsken said in an interview that Sarkozy had initially complained about going to "the middle of nowhere", but later "was over the moon" following an outpouring of support from the people of Straubing.

== Personal life and death ==
Hinsken was Catholic. He was married and had two children.

Hinsken was a voluntary member of the advisory boards at the Tourism Association of Eastern Bavaria, the Academy for Tourism in Freiburg, Bavarian Tourismus Marketing GmbH, and the Munich University of Applied Sciences. He was also a member of the board of directors at the Sparkasse Straubing-Bogen and the advisory board at the Savings Banks Association of Bavaria. Hinsken served as president of the German Spa Association.

Hinsken died on 30 August 2020 in Regensburg at the age of 77.

== Awards ==
- Bavarian Order of Merit
- Federal Cross of Merit
- State Medal for Special Services to the Bavarian Economy
- Golden Ring of Honor of German Crafts
- Municipal Medal of Merit in Silver
- Constitutional Medal in Silver
