= Ophelia Nick =

German politician (born 1973)

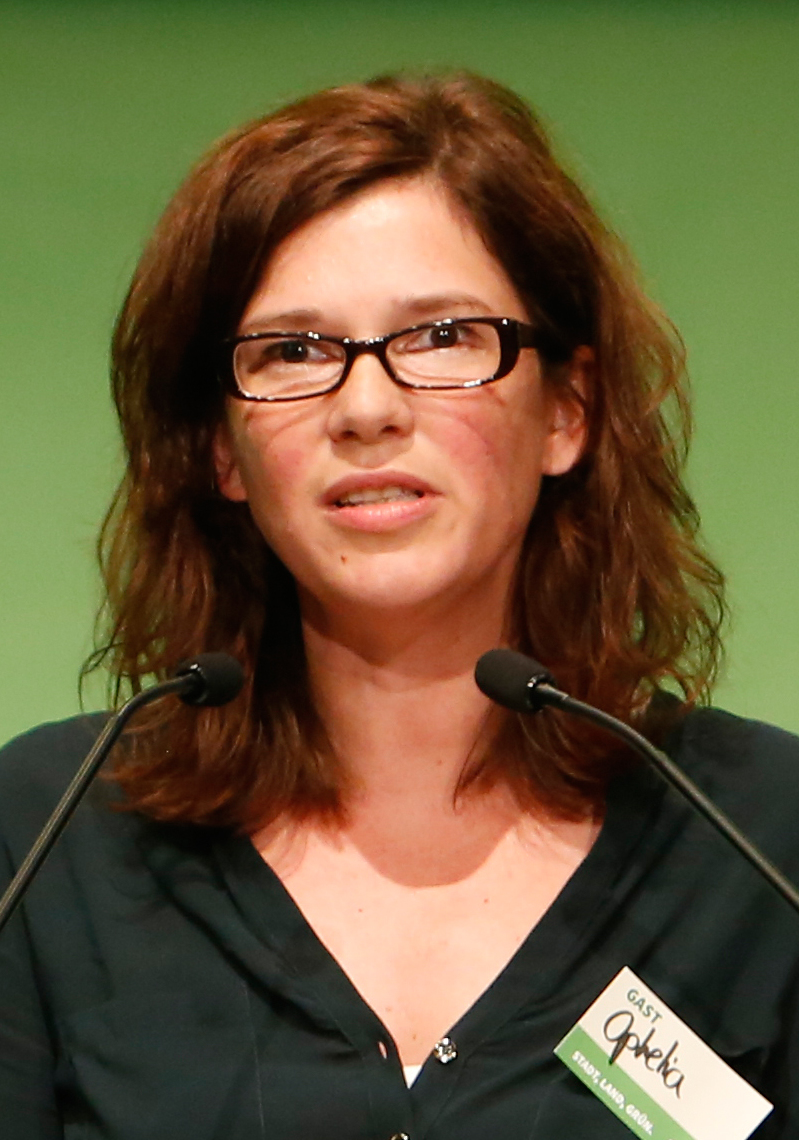
- Nick in 2014

Member of the Bundestag
- Incumbent
- Assumed office 26 October 2021
- Constituency: North Rhine-Westphalia

Personal details
- Born: 24 January 1973 (age 53) Herdecke, West Germany
- Party: Alliance 90/The Greens
- Education: Free University of Berlin

Ophelia Johanna Nick (née Schily, born 24 January 1973) is a German veterinarian and politician of Alliance 90/The Greens who has been serving as a member of the Bundestag since the 2021 national elections, representing the Mettmann II district.

In addition to her parliamentary work, Nick served as Parliamentary State Secretary in the Federal Ministry of Food and Agriculture in the coalition government of Chancellor Olaf Scholz from 2021 to 2025.

== Early life and education ==
Nick is the daughter of physicians Angela Voith and Konrad Schily. From 1993 to 2000, she studied veterinary medicine at the Free University of Berlin. In 2012, she completed a PhD program at LMU Munich.

== Political career ==
Nick joined the Green Party in 2010.

From 2014 to 2018, Nick was part of Green Party's leadership in North Rhine-Westphalia under its co-chairs Mona Neubaur and Sven Lehmann.

In the negotiations to form a coalition government of the Christian Democratic Union (CDU) and the Green Party under Minister-President of North Rhine-Westphalia Hendrik Wüst following the 2022 state elections, Nick was part of her party's delegation in the working group on the environment, agriculture and consumer protection.

In 2023, Nick joined a cross-party working group on dogs.

== Other activities ==
- University of Ulm Medical Center, Member of the supervisory board (2012–2016)
- Voith, Member of the supervisory board (2010–2017)

== Personal life ==
Nick has two sons. She is married to physician Oliver Nick, who has also two sons.
