= Peter Beyer (politician) =

German politician (born 1970)

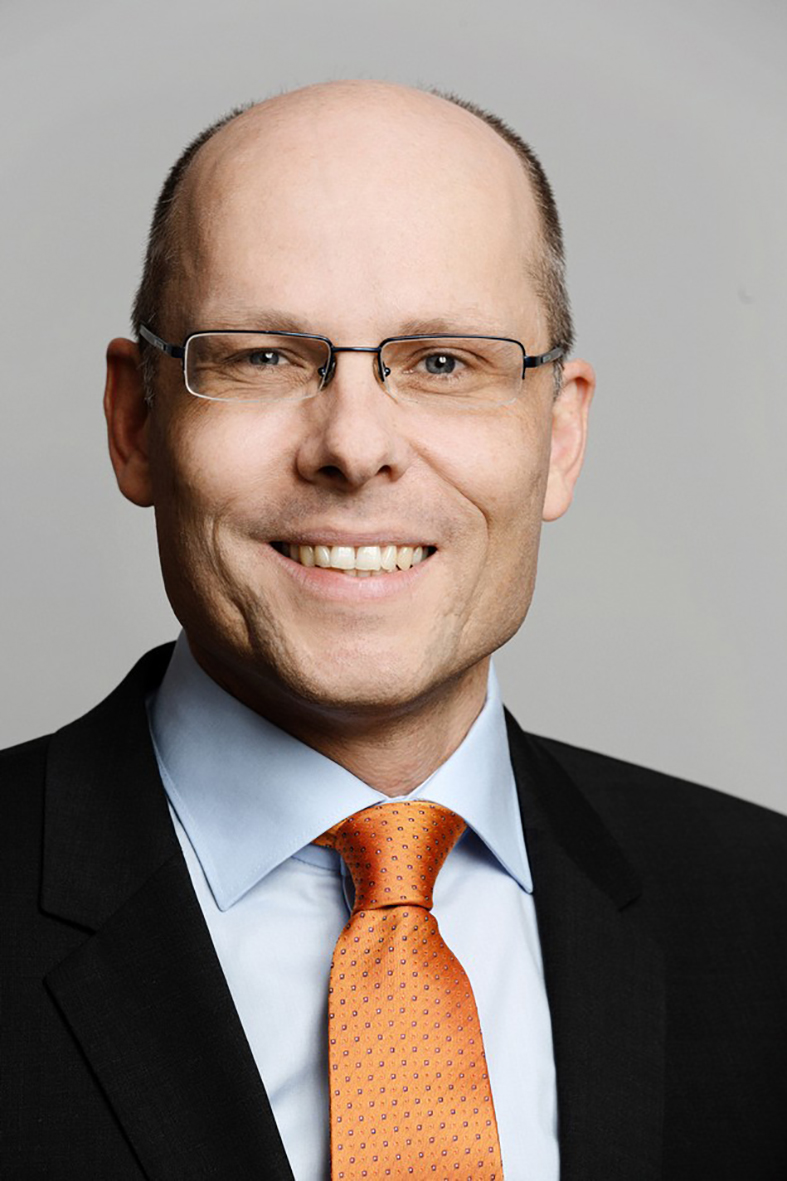

Member of the Bundestag
- Incumbent
- Assumed office 2009

Personal details
- Born: 25 December 1970 (age 55) Ratingen, West Germany
- Party: Christian Democratic Union
- Children: 2
- Education: University of Düsseldorf; University of Bonn
- Occupation: Lawyer

Peter Beyer (born 25 December 1970) is a German lawyer and politician of the Christian Democratic Union (CDU) who has been a member of the German Bundestag since 2009.

In addition to his parliamentary work, Beyer served as the Coordinator of Transatlantic Cooperation at the Federal Foreign Office in the fourth coalition government of Chancellor Angela Merkel from 2018 to 2021.

== Education and early career ==
After finishing his Abitur in 1991, Beyer completed his military service in Wuppertal. Beyer then studied law at the Universities of Düsseldorf and Bonn. Furthermore, he attended lectures in History and Politics in Bonn. In 1999 he finished his studies and was admitted to the bar. He subsequently worked at the Cologne office of law firm Mayer Brown.

In 2000 Beyer enrolled in a post-graduate legal studies program at the University of Virginia School of Law in Charlottesville where he completed a Master of Laws in 2001. Returning to Germany, Beyer practiced law at the BEYER Intellectual Property firm in Ratingen. There, he became one of the country's first officially certified intellectual property specialists.

== Political career ==
In the federal election on 27 September 2009, Beyer was elected as a Member of the Bundestag. He won his in district "Mettmann II" (consisting of the cities of Heiligenhaus, Ratingen, Velbert und Wülfrath) with a relative majority of 39.8% of the votes.

In the federal election on 22 September 2013, Beyer was re-elected as a Member of the Bundestag, winning his district with a 45.6% relative majority. Currently, he is a member of the Bundestag's Committee on Foreign Affairs, where he serves as his parliamentary group's rapporteur on transatlantical and the relations with Kosovo, Montenegro and Serbia. He is also a member of its Sub-Committee on the United Nations. In 2022, he joined a study commission set up to investigate the entire period of German involvement in Afghanistan from 2001 to 2021 and to draw lessons for foreign and security policy in future.

In addition to his committee assignments, Beyer has been a member of the German delegation to the Parliamentary Assembly of the Council of Europe (PACE) since 2018, where he serves on the Committee on the Honouring of Obligations and Commitments by Member States of the Council of Europe (Monitoring Committee) and the Sub-Committee on Crime Problems and the Fight against Terrorism. In this capacity, he is the Assembly's rapporteur on Kosovo.

Beyer is also a member of the German-American Parliamentary Friendship Group, the Parliamentary Friendship Group for Relations with the States of South-Eastern Europe (Albania, Kosovo, Montenegro, North Macedonia, Serbia) and the Parliamentary Friendship Group for Relations with the States of the Southern Caucasus (Armenia, Azerbaijan, Georgia).

From April 2018, Beyer served as the Coordinator of Transatlantic Cooperation at the Federal Foreign Office in the fourth coalition government of Chancellor Angela Merkel.

== Other activities ==
- 1014 – space for ideas, Member of the Board of Directors
- RIAS Berlin Commission, Ex-Officio Member (2018–2022)
- American Chamber of Commerce in Germany (AmCham Germany), Member of the Membership Committee
- Atlantik-Brücke, Member
- Southeast Europe Association (SOG), Member of the Presidium
- Aspen Institute, Member
- United Europe, Member

== Political positions ==
=== Foreign policy ===
In 2019, Beyer joined fellow CDU lawmakers – including Roderich Kiesewetter and Norbert Röttgen – in co-signing an op-ed in Handelsblatt, calling on Chancellor Angela Merkel to keep Chinese telecom company Huawei out of Germany's 5G network, citing national security reasons.

When President Donald Trump ordered the U.S. military to remove 9,500 troops from Germany in 2020, Beyer called the decision “completely unacceptable, especially since nobody in Washington thought about informing its NATO ally Germany in advance.”

In March 2021, Beyer broke ranks with the official position of Chancellor Angela Merkel’s government by publicly calling for a moratorium on the construction of the Nord Stream 2 natural gas pipeline from Russia to Europe in an effort to improve transatlantic relations.

=== Domestic policy ===
In June 2017, Beyer was one of only five members of the CDU/CSU parliamentary group who abstained from a vote on Germany's introduction of same-sex marriage.

In 2019, Beyer joined 14 members of his parliamentary group who, in an open letter, called for the party to rally around Angela Merkel and party chairwoman Annegret Kramp-Karrenbauer amid criticism voiced by conservatives Friedrich Merz and Roland Koch.

Ahead of the Christian Democrats’ leadership election in 2021, Beyer publicly endorsed Armin Laschet to succeed Annegret Kramp-Karrenbauer as the party's chair.

== Personal life ==
Beyer lives in the German town of Ratingen and has two school-aged children.
