= Agency for Renewable Resources =

German government initiative

- Fachagentur Nachwachsende Rohstoffe e.V. (FNR)
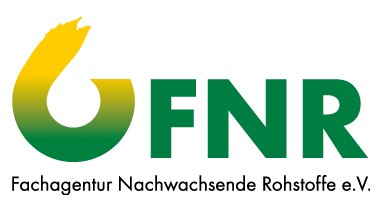

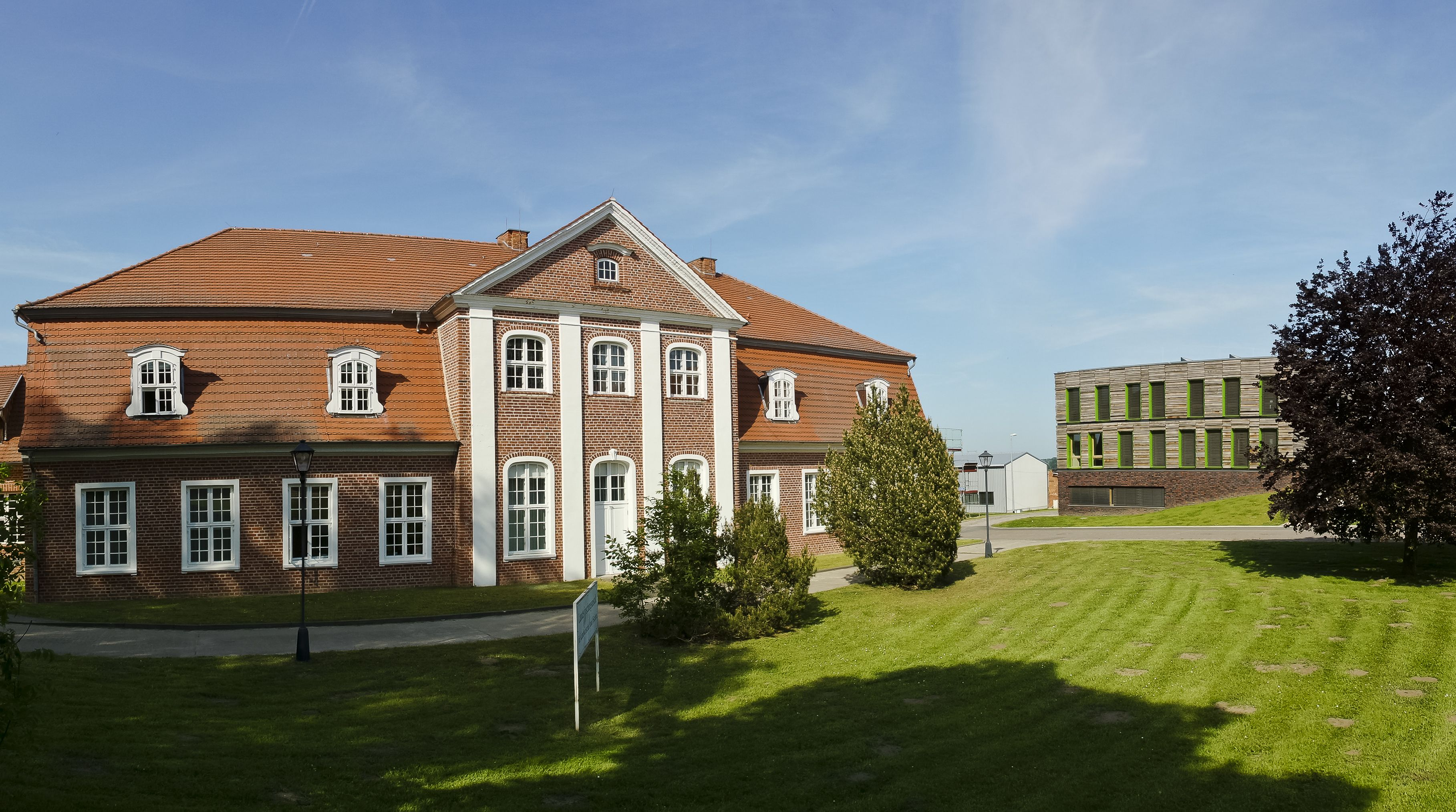
- Headquarters building

Agency overview
- Formed: 1993
- Headquarters: Gülzow, Germany
- Agency executive: Dr Andreas Schütte, Managing Director
- Parent agency: Federal Ministry of Food and Agriculture (Germany)
- Website: https://www.fnr.de/; https://international.fnr.de/

The Agency for Renewable Resources (German: Fachagentur Nachwachsende Rohstoffe e.V. or FNR), was founded in 1993 as a government initiative intended to support research and development in the area of renewable resources. As a project managing organisation, the FNR answers to the Federal Ministry of Food and Agriculture (abbreviated BMEL in German). In May 2015, the BMEL announced the new 'Renewable Resources' funding programme. The Agency for Renewable Resources (FNR) has been entrusted with managing the programme. Currently, around 600 projects with a budget of 193 million euros are being funded by the FNR.

In 2016 the FNR manages 61 million euro provided from Germany's Federal budget for the implementation of the funding programme. An additional 24.6 million euro are allocated for research and development in the field of bioenergy from the Special Energy and Climate Fund (EKF).

'Renewable Resources' Funding Programme

The 'Renewable Resources' funding programme is part of the government's new high-tech strategy to improve Germany's competitive position. It also supports the government's 'Policy Strategy on Bioeconomy', which aims to create a resource-efficient economy that makes use of renewable resources.

The programme is intended to support the further development of a sustainable bio-based economy. This involves developing innovative, internationally competitive bio-based products, as well as processes and technologies for their production. Furthermore, the programme also supports the development of concepts aimed at improving the sustainability of the bio-based economy, while taking society's expectations into account.

== Structure ==
The FNR is a registered association. Its task is to effectively and continuously contribute to the research and development as well as the use of renewable resources taking into account conflicts of use, direct and indirect land use changes, biomass conversion processes as well as sustainability concepts.

The bodies of the FNR are

- the General Assembly, consisting of seven members who are entitled to vote and are part of the Federal Ministry of Food and Agriculture (BMEL) as well as supporting members that perform a consultative function,
- the Managing Board,
- the Specialised Advisory Committee and the Managing Board of the Specialised Advisory Committee, as well as
- the Managing Director.

Organisation chart

== Tasks ==
=== Promotion of Research and Development ===
The FNR's main task is to support applied research and development in the field of sustainable development and use of renewable resources. It develops processes and products to make them ready for the market. The FNR supports around 6800 projects each year.

=== Information and Public Relations ===
The FNR is the first point of contact for all matters concerning renewable resources. Alongside specialist information, explanations and advice also play an important role. The FNR operates a variety of thematic portals providing information on the use of renewable resources. In addition, there are numerous publications available in the FNR's media library. Regular events and industry and consumer expos round off the spectrum of activities.

=== EU and International Activities ===
As well as taking part in EU funded projects, the FNR is also involved in European and international committees and working groups that develop strategies for the sustainable use of biomass using innovative and efficient technologies.

== Miscellaneous ==
In a unique pilot project (2007–2010), the FNR, in cooperation with Wikimedia Germany and the nova-Institute, implemented the first government-funded project in Wikipedia: the development of the thematic portal “Renewable Resources".
