= Federal Office of Consumer Protection and Food Safety =

Agency of the German government

Federal Office of Consumer Protection and Food Safety (BVL)
- Bundesamt für Verbraucherschutz und Lebensmittelsicherheit
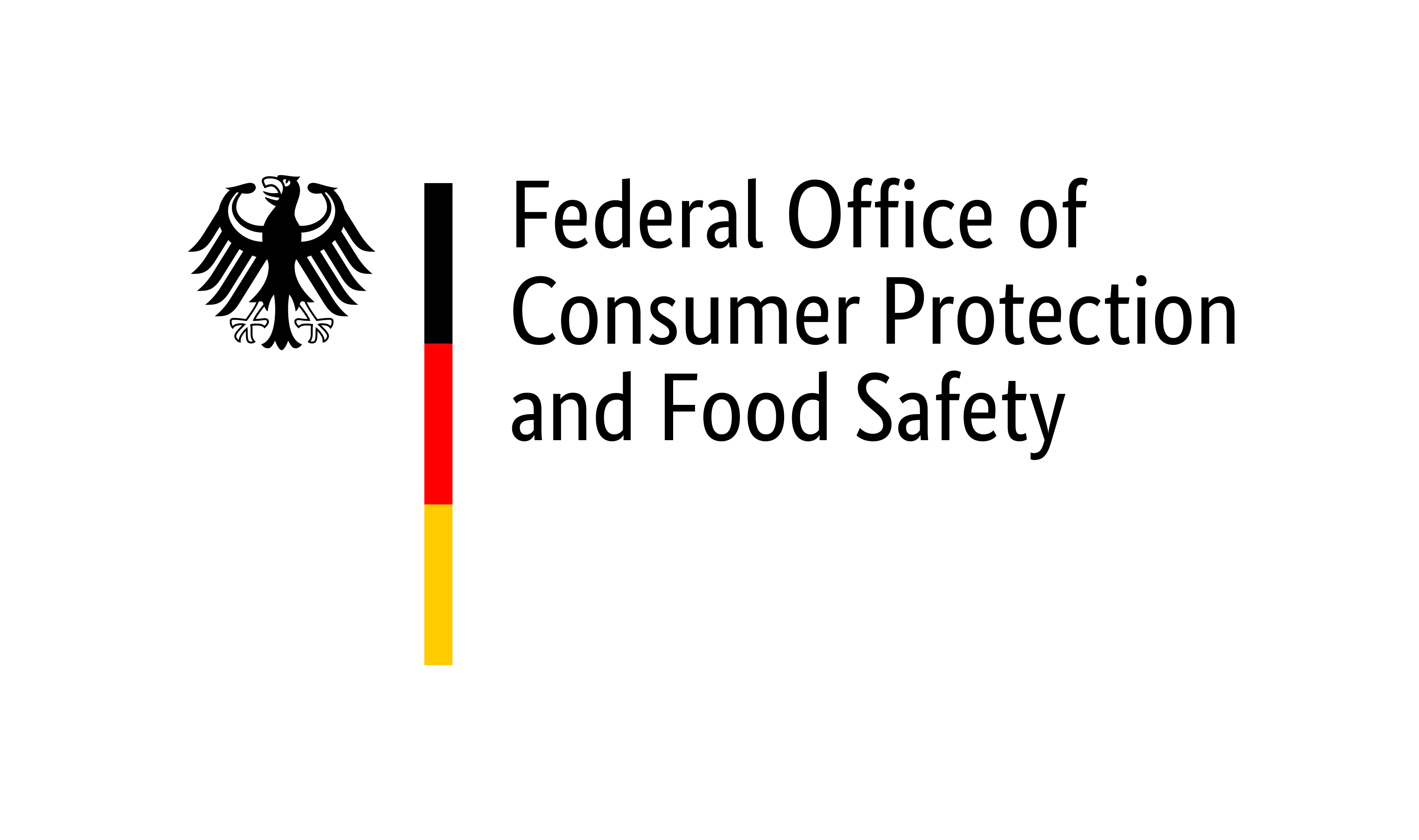

Agency overview
- Formed: 2002
- Headquarters: Braunschweig, Germany Three locations: Braunschweig-Bundesallee Berlin-Mitte Berlin-Marienfelde
- Employees: More than 900
- Agency executive: Gaby-Fleur Böl, President
- Parent agency: Federal Ministry of Agriculture, Food and Regional Identity
- Website: https://bvl.bund.de

The Federal Office of Consumer Protection and Food Safety (German: Bundesamt für Verbraucherschutz und Lebensmittelsicherheit) is a federal agency of Germany responsible for risk management in health-related consumer protection and food safety. Established on 1 January 2002 following the BSE crisis, the BVL operates under the Federal Ministry of Agriculture, Food and Regional Identity (BMLEH) and serves as the central coordination point between federal and state authorities in consumer protection matters.

The BVL is headquartered in Braunschweig, Lower Saxony, with additional offices in Berlin. The agency's primary mission is to improve coordination between federal and state governments, make risk communication more transparent, and manage risks before they develop into crises.

== History ==
=== Background and establishment ===
The establishment of the BVL was a direct consequence of several food safety crises in the late 1990s, culminating in the BSE crisis that reached Germany in 2000. These events led to extensive public discussion about consumer health protection and exposed weaknesses in the existing system where risk assessment and risk management were handled by the same institutions.

Following a report by Hedda von Wedel, the then-president of the Federal Audit Office, the German government initiated a comprehensive reorganisation of health-related consumer protection on 1 January 2002. The reorganisation separated risk assessment from risk management to improve transparency of government actions. While the newly created Federal Institute for Risk Assessment (BfR) took responsibility for independent scientific risk assessment, the BVL was established as the authority for risk management.

=== Early development ===
The BVL began operations in May 2002 with 25 employees working from a single office in Bonn with only one telephone. Dr. Christian Grugel became the first president in May 2002, initially heading the agency as the Federal Agency for Consumer Protection and Food Safety before it was renamed to Federal Office in 2003.

As part of the reorganisation, various specialist departments were transferred to the BVL from existing institutions:

- The Plant Protection Product department from the Biological Federal Institute for Agriculture and Forestry
- The Feed department from the Federal Institute for Agriculture and Food
- The specialist unit for veterinary drug approval from the Federal Institute for Consumer Health Protection and Veterinary Medicine
- Genetic engineering approval responsibilities from the Robert Koch Institute in 2004

=== Leadership transitions ===
Dr. Helmut Tschiersky led the BVL from 2008 to November 2019, overseeing significant expansion and modernisation of the agency, including the addition of new responsibilities in areas such as food fraud and food crime. Friedel Cramer served as president from December 2019 to July 2025. Since July 21, 2025, Prof. Dr. Gaby-Fleur Böl has been president of the Bundesamt für Verbraucherschutz und Lebensmittelsicherheit (BVL).

== Organisation and structure ==
=== Leadership ===
The BVL is currently headed by President Prof. Dr. Gaby-Fleur Böl, who has taken office since July 21, 2025. Prof. Böl brings a strong background in science and administration and previously held a key position at the Bundesinstitut für Risikobewertung (Federal Institute for Risk Assessment).

=== Organisational departments ===
The BVL is organised into five specialist departments plus central services:

- Department 1 (Food, Feed and Consumer Products) - Located in Berlin
- Department 2 (Plant Protection Products) - Located in Braunschweig
- Department 3 (Veterinary Medicines) - Located in Berlin
- Department 4 (Genetic Engineering) - Located in Berlin
- Department 5 (Method Standardisation, Reference Laboratories, Antibiotic Resistance) - Located in Berlin-Marienfelde
- Department Z (Central Services) - Located in both Braunschweig and Berlin

== Tasks and responsibilities ==
=== Core functions ===
The BVL's primary responsibility is risk management in health-related consumer protection, with the overarching goal of improving coordination between federal and state levels, making risk communication more transparent, and managing risks before they develop into crises.

=== Food and feed safety ===
In food safety, the BVL coordinates nationwide monitoring programmes conducted by the federal states and serves as the German national contact point for the European Rapid Alert System for Food and Feed (RASFF). The agency also coordinates official food control plans and supports crisis management activities. During food safety incidents, the BVL can establish a crisis management centre and coordinate responses between different levels of government.

=== Authorisation activities ===
The BVL serves as the national competent authority for authorising:

Plant Protection Products: The BVL is responsible for the authorisation of pesticides in Germany, conducting risk management assessments and setting conditions for safe use. It also coordinates European cooperation on active substance evaluation and maximum residue level determination.

Veterinary Medicines: The agency authorises veterinary medicines and conducts post-marketing surveillance to ensure continued safety and efficacy. This includes monitoring adverse drug reactions and ensuring compliance with regulations on residues in food of animal origin.

Genetic Engineering: The BVL approves deliberate releases of genetically modified organisms (GMOs) for scientific trials and provides opinions on EU marketing authorisation applications. It also maintains the GMO location register and coordinates monitoring activities.

=== Consumer products ===
The BVL coordinates monitoring of consumer products including cosmetics, tobacco products, food contact materials, and other commodities that come into contact with food or the human body. It provides information to poison control centres and maintains lists of products for infection prevention.

=== Reference laboratories ===
The BVL operates eight National Reference Laboratories and one European Reference Laboratory for residues of veterinary drugs and contaminants in foodstuffs of animal origin. These laboratories develop standardised analytical methods and ensure the comparability of food control data across Germany and Europe.

== International cooperation ==
=== European Union activities ===
The BVL is deeply integrated into the European food safety system, participating in approximately 150 international committees and organisations. It serves as the German contact point for inspections by the European Commission's Health and Food Audits and Analysis directorate (formerly Food and Veterinary Office) and coordinates with the European Food Safety Authority (EFSA) on risk assessment matters.

=== Global partnerships ===
Beyond the EU, the BVL maintains bilateral cooperation agreements with counterpart authorities worldwide, with particular focus on Asia (China, India) and North Africa (Morocco, Tunisia). The agency participates in development cooperation projects and provides technical assistance through EU twinning projects and other international programmes.

=== Training and capacity building ===
The BVL organises the "International Training for Safer Food" (ITS-Food) programme, providing training to officials from non-EU countries on European food safety systems and risk management approaches.

== Publications and reporting ==
The BVL publishes comprehensive annual reports on food safety, including:

- National Monitoring Reports - Systematic analysis of contaminants and residues in food
- National Residue Control Plan Reports - Results of residue monitoring in food of animal origin
- Import Surveillance Plan Reports - Control of imported food products
- Antibiotic Resistance Monitoring Reports - Surveillance of resistance in animal pathogens

These reports provide transparent communication to the public and serve as the basis for policy decisions and risk management measures.

== Legal framework ==
The BVL operates under the authority of the BVL Act (BVL-Gesetz), enacted on 6 August 2002 and taking effect on 1 November 2002. The agency's specific responsibilities are further defined in various specialist laws covering food, feed, plant protection, veterinary medicines, and genetic engineering.

The separation of risk assessment (conducted by the BfR) and risk management (conducted by the BVL) reflects the European model, where the European Food Safety Authority provides scientific advice while the European Commission handles risk management decisions.

== Crisis management ==
The BVL plays a central role in crisis management for food safety emergencies. It operates a Crisis Unit Office established in 2013 and can activate task forces and situation centres when needed. The agency has developed early warning systems and prevention mechanisms to identify potential problems before they escalate into full crises.

== See also ==
- Federal Institute for Risk Assessment
- Federal Ministry of Agriculture, Food and Regional Identity
- European Food Safety Authority
- Food safety
- Rapid Alert System for Food and Feed
