= Silvia Bender =

German politician (born 1970)

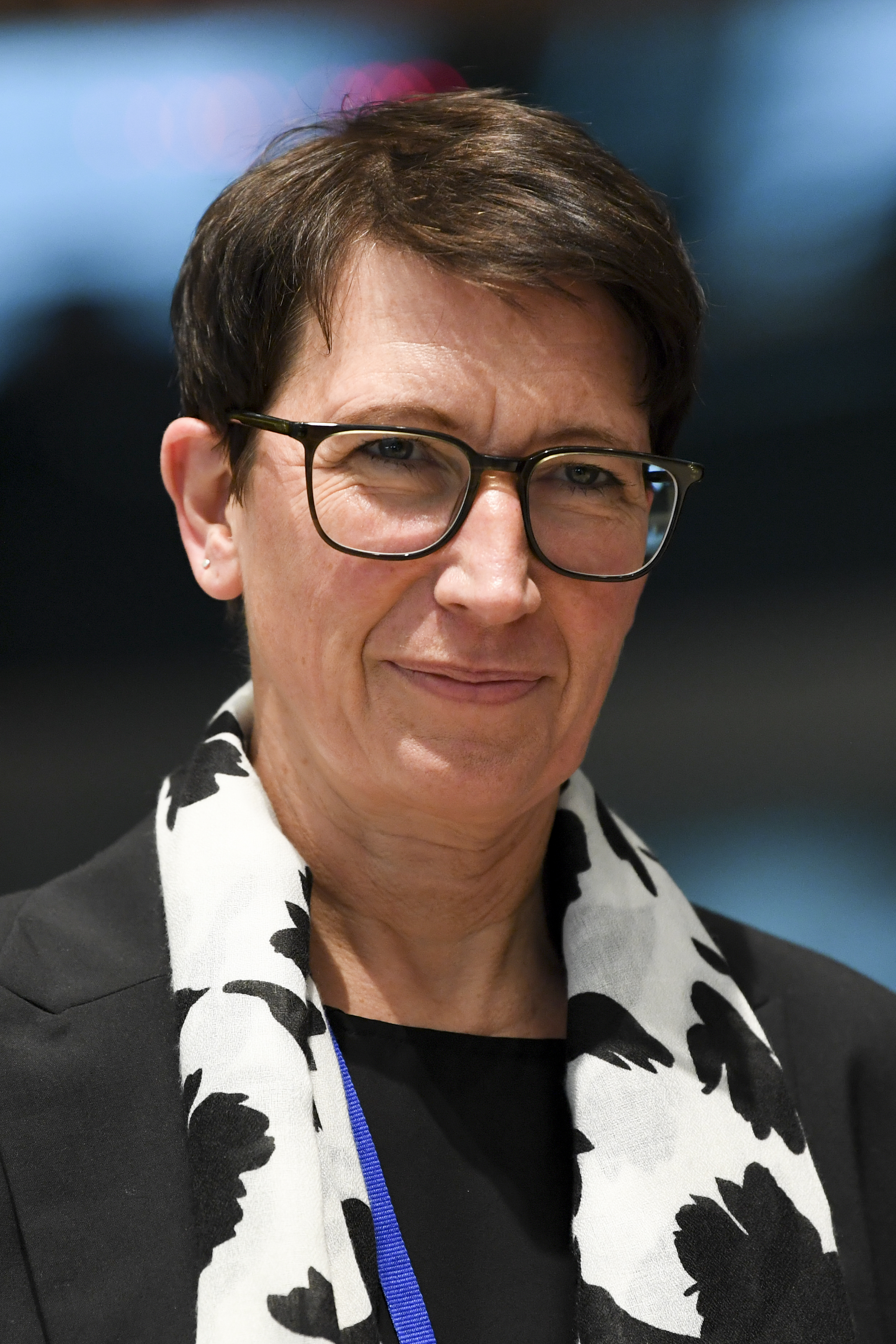
- Born: 9 March 1970 (age 55); Bonn, West Germany
- Known for: State Secretary at the Federal Ministry of Food and Agriculture

Silvia Bender (born 9 March 1970) is a German Green party politician and a State Secretary at the Federal Ministry of Food and Agriculture since 2019.

== Life ==
Bender was born in 1970 in Bonn, West Germany.

She was appointed as the State Secretary in the Ministry of Agriculture, Environment and Climate Protection of Brandenburg in 2019.

In 2021 she became a State Secretary at the Federal Ministry of Food and Agriculture.

She announced that antibiotics given to animals had been reduced by 100 tonnes since the previous year in August 2022.

In 2022 she faced criticism from demonstrating farmers who were protesting in Bonn at the proposed banning of pesticides in certain areas. She said that these were EU proposals of which Germany was broadly in favour.

Bender's tasks include a commitment to ensure that 30% of food production in Germany is organic by 2030. This 5% more that the overall EU target. Her ministry was encouraging canteens and restaurants to include more organic food in 2023 as they wanted to see the incorporation of this food throughout the value chain.
