= Federal Institute for Risk Assessment =

German federal government body

Bundesinstitut für Risikobewertung (BfR)
- German Federal Institute for Risk Assessment; Bundesinstitut für Risikobewertung

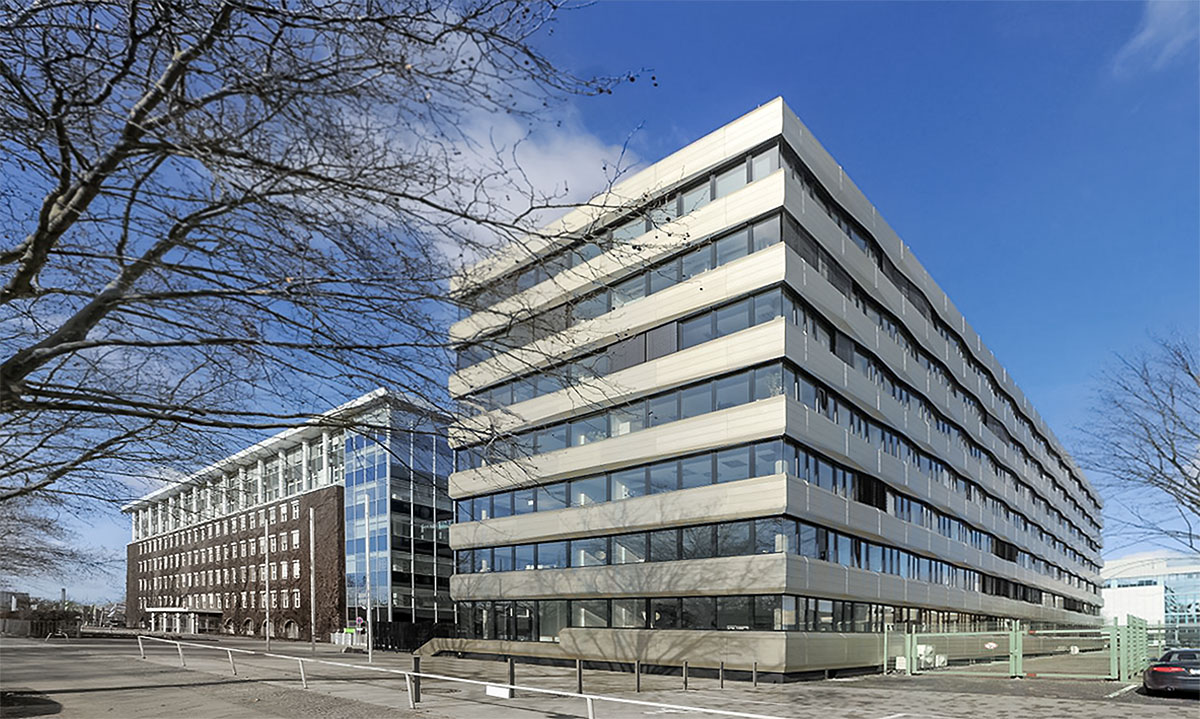
- Headquarters building in Berlin-Jungfernheide

Agency overview
- Formed: November 2002
- Jurisdiction: Body under public law with full legal capacity (Anstalt öffentlichen Rechts)
- Headquarters: Berlin, Germany Three locations: Berlin-Jungfernheide Berlin-Marienfelde Berlin-Alt-Marienfelde
- Employees: More than 750
- Agency executive: Professor Dr. Dr. Andreas Hensel, President
- Parent agency: Federal Ministry of Food and Agriculture
- Website: BfR.bund.de/en/home.html

The German Federal Institute for Risk Assessment (German: Bundesinstitut für Risikobewertung), abbreviated BfR, is a body under public law of the German federal government with full legal capacity. The institute comes under the portfolio of the Federal Ministry of Food and Agriculture (German: Bundesministeriums für Ernährung und Landwirtschaft, BMEL) and has the task of providing scientific advice to the federal government on issues relating to food safety, product safety, chemical safety, contaminants in the food chain, animal protection and consumer health protection. Further technical supervision is performed by the Federal Ministry for the Environment, Nature Conservation, Building and Nuclear Safety (chemicals safety, environmental contamination in feed and food) and the Federal Ministry of Transport (transport of hazardous goods, International Convention on Ballast Water Management, Central Command for Maritime Emergencies).

== Areas of responsibility ==
The BfR was founded in 2002. Like the Federal Office of Consumer Protection and Food Safety, (German: Bundesamt für Verbraucherschutz und Lebensmittelsicherheit, BVL), it was called into being in the context of the reorganisation of consumer health protection and food safety in the aftermath of the BSE crisis. So risk assessment and risk management are legally separate activities (Regulation (EC) No. 178/2002). The BfR has more than 750 employees on staff.

The work of the BfR is based on a number of national legal regulations – including the founding law of the German Federal Institute for Risk Assessment, the Food and Feed Code (LFGB), Protection Against Infection Act (IfSG), Plant Protection Act, Chemicals Act, Washing and Cleaning Agents Act), and Genetic Engineering Act.

Its three main areas of responsibility – food safety, product safety and chemicals safety – cover a wide range of subjects.

The BfR is therefore the contact partner for questions on

- the biological safety of food, for example in the case of zoonoses (these are pathogens like salmonella that can be transferred from animals to people), their research, exposure routes and prevalence
- microbiological toxins, for example in shellfish, or on antibiotic resistance of germs
- food hygiene
- contents of food, such as coumarin in cinnamon or the formation of benzene in carrot juice (food toxicology)
- food risks, for instance through food supplements, on allergies or on functional foods such as plant sterols in spreadable fats for reducing cholesterol levels
- genetically modified foods
- the contamination of food with pollutants such as dioxins, polychlorinated biphenyls (PCB) or polycyclic aromatic hydrocarbons (PAH; PAK in German)
- the safety of animal feed
- plant protection products and biocides
- poisoning
- the safe transport of toxic substances
- nanotechnology in food, consumer goods or cosmetics
- the safety of chemicals, cosmetics, textiles, toys, water pipes, food packaging and other consumer-oriented products
- alternatives to animal testing

The BfR is a member of the Working Group of the German Federal Departmental Research Establishments (German: Arbeitsgemeinschaft der Ressortforschungseinrichtungen).

In accordance with its founding law, the BfR communicates its assessments independent of all political influence. This means that it is not subject to any technical supervision by law with respect to its scientific risk assessments and thus has an important scientific reference and orientation function for consumers, politics (federal and state), the economy, the media, associations and science in the case of unresolved scientific questions and during crises.

== BfR departments ==
Apart from the executive division with its staff units, the BfR currently has nine departments.

=== Administration ===
The Administration department is the service provider for all of the institute's departments. It is responsible for all issues relating to infrastructure, personnel recruitment, support of employees in personnel matters, the steering and control of income and expenditure as well as the equipment and organisational and technical upkeep of the institute's premises and buildings. The department issues organisational rules for the institute and enters into service agreements with the staff council and contracts with external service providers.

=== Risk Communication ===
Consumer health protection comprises the research, assessment and communication of risks. In this context, it is not just the risks themselves that are important, but also their communication in the media and how they are perceived. Scientific findings must be communicated in a transparent and understandable manner in order to promote rational handling of risks. The BfR has the statutory remit of communicating risks and informing the public about possible health risks and the research findings on which they are based in the fields of food safety, chemicals safety and product safety. To this end, the BfR enters into an active dialogue with various contact partners from science, trade and industry, political circles, the media, associations, non-governmental organisations and consumers. Besides target-group oriented press and public relations, this communication process entails the active involvement of various interest groups in expert meetings, status seminars, consumer protection forums, stakeholder conferences and public symposia.

The interdisciplinary Risk Communication department conducts research projects on risk perception, early risk detection and risk impact assessment relating to new methods such as nanotechnology, changes in the nutritional behaviour of consumers following risk communication, or the prioritisation of risks by different social interest groups. As tools for this purpose social research methodes are used, e.g. representative surveys, consumer conferences, delphi questionnaires and focus groups.

The following specialised groups are established in the department:

- Crisis Prevention and Coordination
- Risk Research, Perception, Early Detection and Impact Assessment
- Press and Public Relations
- Scientific Event Management

=== Exposure ===
A key task of the department for Exposure is the analysis, modelling and estimation of consumer exposure to the undesirable substances and microbiological hazards to be assessed by the BfR. According to the definition "risk = hazard x exposure", it checks for every risk assessment whether and in which concentration consumers are exposed to hazardous noxious agents and thus describes the magnitude of a risk. In addition, the department takes on a number of scientific service functions for the BfR.

The following specialised groups are established in the department:

- Transport of Dangerous Goods
- Poisoning and Product Documentation Centre
- Epidemiology, Statistics and Mathematical Modelling
- Exposure Assessment and Exposure Standardisation
- Information Technology
- GLP Federal Bureau for Good Laboratory Practice

=== Biological Safety ===
In the scope of the statutory remit of risk assessment in the area of food safety and consumer protection, the department for Biological Safety deals with health risks for humans, in particular those posed by toxins formed by microorganisms and other microbial metabolites. These include bacteria, yeast and mould, but also viruses, parasites and TSE pathogens ( prions). This work encompasses not only food, but also animal feed and consumer goods (such as appliances for processing food, food packaging materials, tableware) as well as cosmetics, including the processes relating to their collection, manufacture, processing and distribution, as these can be channels for biological risks.

The tasks include diagnostic methods for detecting pathogens in food, their virulence properties, work on the prevalence of microbiological hazards in food, and qualitative and quantitative risk assessments. The department is involved in establishing the cause of outbreaks of foodborne diseases and zoonoses (statutory task laid down in the Protection Against Infection Act).

A number of reference laboratories for the diagnosis and fine typing of pathogens, antibiotic resistance and microbiological contamination of food are established in the department.

The following specialised groups are established in the department:

- Food Technologies, Supply Chains and Food Defense
- Food Microbiology, Pathogen-Host Interactions
- Epidemiology, Zoonoses and Antimicrobial Resistance
- Bacterial Toxins, Food Service
- Diagnostics, Pathogen Characterisation, Parasites in Food
- Viruses in Food
- Product Hygiene and Disinfection Strategies

=== Food Safety ===
The department for Food Safety assesses the substance risks from food. The substances for assessment may be contained naturally as ingredients in food or may be added to the food as additives or flavourings. Undesirable substances which enter food through manufacturing, storage or handling processes are also evaluated.

Furthermore, the department assesses food according to its nutritional-medical criteria. Particular focus is placed on infant nutrition here. The department makes statements on food risks and on questions of nutritional prevention.

An additional focus of the department's work is preparing statements on novel foods as well as on genetically modified food and animal feed.

Modern molecular and cell biological methods are developed and applied in the department in order to identify new biological endpoints for the risk assessment of potentially hazardous substances. Moreover, innovative detection methods as well as strategies and methods for molecular traceability and product identity of foods are developed and applied. The department is actively engaged in research in the field of molecular and biochemical food safety. It seeks to identify connections in terms of mechanisms of action with a view to developing concrete management options for consumer protection.

The following specialised groups are established in the department:

- Junior Research Group Nanotoxicology
- Effect-based Analytics and Toxicogenomics
- Food Toxicology
- Nutritional Risks, Allergies and Novel Foods
- Risks of Subpopulations and Human Studies

=== Pesticides Safety ===
This department's work encompasses the health-related assessment of biocides, pesticides and of preparations (plant protection products and biocide products). The central tasks of the department include determination of the inherent toxic properties and dose-effect relationships, the classification and labelling of active substances in pesticides, the derivation of toxicological limit values, the determination of the exposure of humans, production animals and pets, and the derivation of risk mitigation measures and maximum residue concentrations with the aim of avoiding harmful impacts on the health of humans and animals. In addition, the department reviews analytical monitoring methods and works on the (further) development of regulatory testing and assessment strategies and technical guidelines.

The following specialised groups are established in the department:

- Steering and Overall Assessment – Plant Protection
- Steering and Overall Assessment – Biocides
- Toxicology of Active Substances and their Metabolites
- Toxicology of Products and their Safe Use
- Residues and Analytical Methods

=== Chemicals and Product Safety ===
The work of the department for Chemicals and Product Safety encompasses the health-related assessment of chemicals in the European registration process of chemicals (REACH). The objective is to ensure toxicological assessment, health risk assessment for consumers and the identification and initiation of necessary risk mitigation measures in accordance with the REACH REG. Assessments are also carried out with the aim of classifying and labelling substances in accordance with the CLP Regulation (EC) 1272/2008.

The department was also set up with the aim of preventative identification, research and assessment of health risks in cosmetic products, tobacco products, consumer goods (food packaging, toys, baby bottles, pacifiers, cleaning and personal care products, items of clothing, etc.) as well as other consumer-oriented products (furniture, mattresses, carpets, hobby products, etc.). This takes into account not only the knowledge gaps that exist in scientific risk assessments, but also the concerns of the population in this area. Experimental projects on the migration and exposure as well as the toxicity of chemical substances in these everyday products forms an integral part of the assessment activities.

The following specialised groups are established in the department:

- Coordination and Overall Assessment
- Safety of Chemicals
- Safety of Non-Food Products
- Safety of Food-Contact Materials
- Product Research and Nanotechnology

=== Safety in the Food Chain ===
One of the focuses of the work in the department for Safety in the Food Chain is the assessment of risks which occur through the introduction of contaminants, residues and other undesirable substances into food and feed. The national reference laboratories for dioxins, PCB and mycotoxins in food and feed, marine biotoxins, additives in animal feed, and the Senior Expert Office for the Import Control of Wine are assigned to this department.

Within the scope of the key topic of product identity and traceability, strategies and methods for verifying the authenticity of food are developed. Tasks in the area of pharmacologically effective substances and veterinary medicine include the risk assessment of residues of medicine for human or animal use found in foods of animal origin, appraisal of and statements on residues with pharmacological effect in the context of consulting with the federal and state authorities, as well as leading projects on the analysis and assessment of residues. Alongside this, the department also carries out research on such things as the further development of concepts for detecting potentially toxic substances and their metabolites in food and feed.

The following specialised groups are established in the department:

- Residues
- Contaminants
- Product Identity, Supply Chains and Traceability
- Feed and Feed Additives

=== Experimental Toxicology and ZEBET ===
The BfR has the national task of documenting and assessing supplementary and alternative methods to animal testing and of recommending or enforcing their recognition nationally and internationally. This lies within the federal government's area of responsibility via ZEBET –the Centre for Documentation and Evaluation of Alternatives to Animal Experiments. One of ZEBET's important tasks is the experimental validation of methods not involving animal testing in order to achieve their acceptance in international, official, safety-toxicological OECD test guidelines. The centre also carries out its own research work and sponsors projects for developing alternative methods of other institutions in a targeted manner using a special budget.

Through ZEBET's work, the BfR advocates replacing legally prescribed animal experiments in particular, with alternative test methods wherever possible on a national and international basis.

The department is divided into five specialised groups:

- ZEBET – Database and Information Procurement
- ZEBET – Alternative Methods to Animal Experiments
- Animal Protection and Laboratory Animal Science
- Strategies for Toxicological Assessments
- Animal Husbandry, Aquaculture and Reference Materials

== Remit of the BfR ==
The focus of the BfR's work is on people as consumers. With its work, the institute wishes to contribute to improving the safety of foods, substances and products and thus protect the health of consumers.

=== Scientific, research-based approach ===
The BfR carries out its own research on topics that are closely related to its assessment tasks in consumer health protection and food safety. The federal institute performs scientific work together with other international establishments and organisations as well as with institutions in other countries that are active in the fields of consumer health protection and food safety. The BfR is also a member of the Working Group of the German Federal Departmental Research Establishments. Cooperation with the European Food Safety Authority (EFSA) for which the BfR is the national German point of contact (EFSA-Focal-Point), is an additional focus.

The state and federal authorities responsible for risk management can access the institute's health assessments and management options. The BfR's research results and recommendations serve as important decision-making aids for measures in all affected areas, such as science, industry and industrial associations, trade, non-governmental organisations, consumer advice centres, the media, national and international committees and organisations, and interested consumers. With its science-based risk assessments, the BfR provides an important impetus for consumer health protection within and outside of Germany.

=== Risk assessment ===
Risk assessment, risk management and risk communication are legally (Regulation (EC) No. 178/2002) separate activities. In Germany, the health-related risk assessment for the area of food and feed as well as for cosmetics, consumer products and chemicals lies within the BfR's area of responsibility. The BfR applies scientific assessment criteria according to internationally recognised assessment standards and principles on a statutory basis. The Federal Office of Consumer Protection and Food Safety (BVL) is responsible for the risk management of food and feed as well as product safety.

In the context of food and feed safety, risk assessment is taken to mean a risk-oriented assessment with the aim of characterising a hazard that can originate from food or feed and estimating its possible occurrence and severity for the affected group of consumers (also known as exposure assessment). Often, topics of public discussion are addressed, with the aim of providing a clear and objective evaluation of the situation. However, the BfR also carries out research and evaluations on request from authorities, for example when no laws are (yet) in place relating to a certain risk. To ensure that the assessment principles of the health-related risk assessments are transparent and comprehensible, the BfR has published a guideline for health-related assessments in consumer protection. The functional independence and the science-based risk assessment are intended to ensure that the BfR's health-related risk assessments are carried out without influences from political, industrial or social interests.

=== Risk communication ===
The BfR has the statutory remit of providing information on potential, detected and assessed risks which could be posed to consumers by food, substances and products. The entire assessment process should be laid out in a transparent manner for all citizens. The BfR makes science visible and useful to consumers by means of extensive, complete and comprehensible risk communication. All opinions are published on the BfR-homepage.

== Special tasks with national and Europe-wide effects ==
=== National reference laboratories ===
17 national reference laboratories (NRL) for the areas of food safety and food hygiene as well as the Senior Expert Office for the Import Control of Wine with similar tasks are located at the BfR. They were appointed by the federal government on the basis of European or national legal regulations. The national reference laboratories take on a leading role in the area of analytic-diagnostic methodology, and they are the national link between the reference laboratories of the EU and the laboratories which carry out food monitoring in the Länder (States of Germany).

=== Federal Bureau for Good Laboratory Practice ===
The Federal Bureau for Good Laboratory Practice, (GLP) is responsible for the coordination and harmonisation of GLP-related issues in the national and international context, as well as for monitoring specific GLP test facilities in Germany and abroad.

=== National EFSA contact point ===
As the central national contact point (EFSA Focal Point), the BfR coordinates the exchange of scientific information between the European Food Safety Authority (EFSA) and the authorities responsible for food and feed safety in Germany, as well as involved parties from the field of industry, politics, science and consumer associations.

=== National Breastfeeding Committee ===
The National Breastfeeding Committee at the BfR has the task of promoting breastfeeding in Germany.

== External expertise ==
The BfR has set up 15 national expert committees. These committees, which generally convene twice a year, have the task of providing advice to the BfR on concept-related and methodical questions and of assuring the scientific quality of the BfR. The committees members, who act on a voluntary basis, are not involved in the official risk assessment work. The committees's decisions have an advisory nature for the BfR. In this regard, the commissions are fundamentally different to the panels of the European Food Safety Authority (EFSA). With respect to its panels, EFSA follows different principles than the BfR, in that the EFSA panels prepare risk assessments for the EFSA.

With its committees, the BfR pools the highest levels of scientific expertise available in Germany. During crises, the committees guarantee fast access to a network of experts. The external experts come from universities and other research institutes, federal and state authorities, trade and consumer associations, private laboratories and industry. They are appointed for a period of four years by the appointing panel. The appointing panel is made up members of the BfR Scientific Advisory Board, the chairs of the German Research Foundation's Senate Committees for the Health Assessment of Food and of Substances and Resources in Agriculture, and a representative of the Senate of Federal Research Agencies. The committee members are announced on the BfR website.

The BfR is aware of the problems posed by a possible conflict of interests among the external experts. Therefore, the applying experts must pledge during the application stage to act independently and in the public interest during their office as committee members. Any conflicts of interest with the topics covered in the BfR committees must be recorded in writing. To this end, the members sign a corresponding declaration which is published on the BfR website. In addition to this, every committee meeting starts off with a verbal inquiry about any potential conflict of interest relating to the topics to be discussed, and the results are recorded in the minutes which are then published on the BfR website.

== Independence ==
The independence of the results and risk communication of the BfR's scientific risk assessments from the superordinated is laid down by law. The experiences from the BSE crisis and the subsequent dramatic loss of public trust in political action led the German Bundestag to introduce the BfR as an independent voice of science in the processes of public and parliamentary policy advice. This was embedded in the BfR founding law (Art.2 Par. 3 BfRG). In the interests of independence, the BfR also does not take any financial resources from industry. To ensure an independent risk assessment, the BfR has established rules on the independence of its scientists. The overall concept of risk assessment and communication at the BfR provides for exchange of views with all stakeholders (NGOs, consumer associations, industry, politics, science, the media). Particularly when different scientific positions are represented and defended, the involvement of different stakeholders is of key importance. This is also reflected in the large number of BfR events in the context of scientific dialogue, such as the BfR consumer protection forums, the BfR stakeholder conferences, the BfR symposia and seminars, user conferences, specialist conferences, commission and committee meetings, work group meetings, technical and expert discussions, expert meetings, workshops, etc. On the occasion of its 10th anniversary, the institute held the European Stakeholder Conference "How Independent can Science be?" on 20 November 2012, dealing with the subject "Independence and conflicts of interest".

== Cooperation ==
In the area of food and feed safety, the BfR works in close cooperation with the European Food Safety Authority (EFSA) and its European sister authorities. The EU Food Safety Almanac, drawn up by the BfR, provides an overview of these authorities. At an international level, the BfR cooperates with the "Codex Alimentarius", a joint commission of the World Health Organisation (WHO) and the Food and Agriculture Organization of the United Nations (FAO), which develops international food standards for the protection of consumers.

In addition, the BfR is linked to a large number of scientific sister and partner organisations through cooperation contracts. The aim of these links is to achieve scientific cooperation in risk assessment, including in the area of food and feed, as well as the exchange of scientists' views and scientific findings. This is important because trade throughout the world today is highly globalised in the area of food and feed, as well as product safety.

The BfR has concluded cooperation contracts with the following institutions:

- Austria: Austrian Agency for Health and Food Safety (AGES) (Contract signed in 2006)
- Brazil: National Health Surveillance Agency (ANVISA) (Contract signed in 2012)
- Bulgaria: Bulgarian Food Safety Agency (BFSA) (Contract signed in 2014)
- Cyprus: State General Laboratory of Cyprus (Contract signed in 2010)
- China: Chinese Academy of Inspection and Quarantine (CAIQ) (Contract signed in 2009), China National Center for Food Safety Risk Assessment (CFSA) (Contract signed in 2012), Chinese Academy of Agricultural Sciences (CAAS) (Contract signed in 2012), China Animal Health and Epidemiology Center (CAHEC) (Contract signed in 2013)
- Estonia: Ministry of Agriculture (PM) (Contract signed in 2015)
- Republic of Korea (South Korea) : Korea Food and Drug Administration (KFDA) and National Institute of Food and Drug Safety Evaluation (NIFDS) (Contract signed in 2010)
- Croatia: Croatian Food Agency (HAH) (Contract signed in 2009)
- Denmark: National Food Institute, Technical University of Denmark (DTU) (Contract signed in 2010, renewed in 2013, jointly with ANSES, France)
- Finland: Finnish Food Safety Authority (Evira) (Contract signed in 2015)
- France: French Agency for Food, Environmental and Occupational Health and Safety (ANSES) (Contract signed in 2010, renewed in 2013, jointly with DTU, Denmark)
- Iceland: Icelandic Food and Veterinary Authority (MAST) (Contract signed in 2012), Icelandic Food and Biotech R&D (MATIS Ltd.) (Contract signed in 2012)
- India: Food Safety and Standards Authority of India (FSSAI) (Contract signed in 2015)
- Latvia: Food and Veterinary Service (PVD) (Contract signed in 2005), Food Safety, Animal Health and Environment Institute (BIOR) (Contract signed in 2012)
- Lithuania: National Food and Veterinary Risk Assessment Institute (NFVRAI) (Contract signed in 2008, renewed in 2013), State Food and Veterinary Service (VMVT) (Contract signed in 2008)
- Montenegro: Ministry of Agriculture and Rural Development (MPR) (Contract signed in 2015)
- Netherlands: Netherlands Food and Consumer Product Safety Authority (NVWA) (Contract signed in 2006)
- Poland: The National Veterinary Research Institute (PIWET) (Contract signed in 2012)
- Portugal: Economic and Food Safety Authority (ASAE) (Contract signed in 2015)
- Russia: Russian Federal Service for Surveillance on Consumer Rights Protection and Human Wellbeing (Rospotrebnadzor, FGUS) and Research Institute of Nutrition of the Russian Federation (RAMN) (Contract signed in 2009)
- Uruguay: Department for Planning and Coordination of Food Safety (UCPIA) of Uruguay's Ministry of Agriculture and Fisheries (Contract signed in 2014)

From 2005, the institute agreed to work in close cooperation with the Stiftung Warentest consumer organisation in Berlin in order to achieve progress in Verbraucherschutz (consumer health protection).

== See also ==
- Animal Study Registry
