= Alois Rainer =

German politician (born 1965)

Alois Rainer MdB
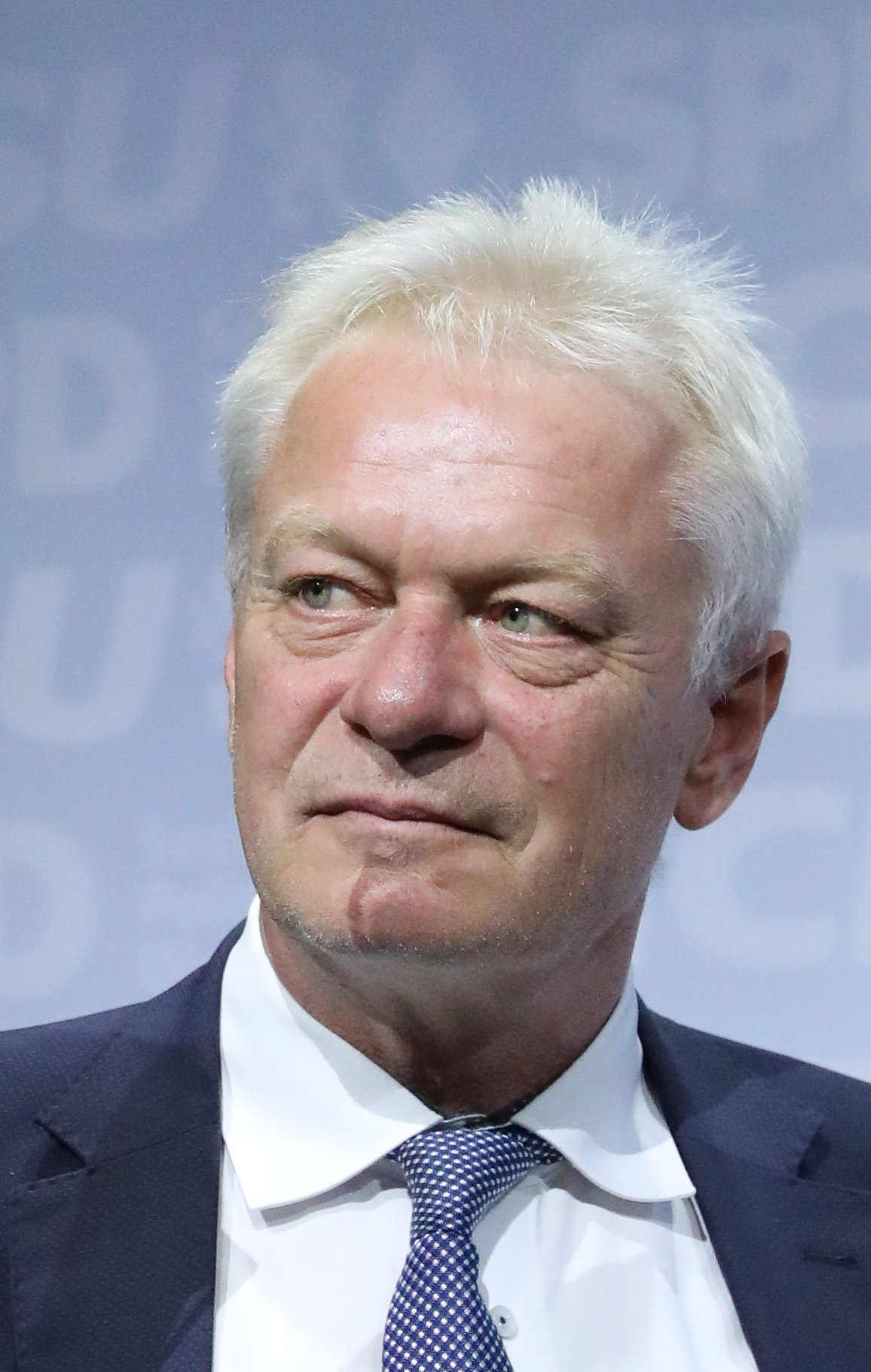
- Rainer in 2025

Minister of Agriculture, Food and Community
- Incumbent
- Assumed office 6 May 2025
- Chancellor: Friedrich Merz
- Preceded by: Cem Özdemir (as Minister of Food and Agriculture)

Member of the Bundestag; for Straubing
- Incumbent
- Assumed office 22 October 2013
- Preceded by: Ernst Hinsken

Mayor of Haibach
- In office 16 March 1996 – 16 March 2014
- Preceded by: Karl Dilger
- Succeeded by: Fritz Schötz

Personal details
- Born: 7 January 1965 (age 61) Straubing, West Germany
- Party: Christian Social Union (since 1989)
- Children: 2
- Relatives: Gerda Hasselfeldt (sister)

Alois Georg Josef Rainer (born 7 January 1965) is a German butcher and politician of the Christian Social Union in Bavaria who has been serving as Minister of Agriculture, Food and Community in the government of Chancellor Friedrich Merz since 2025. He has been serving as a member of the Bundestag from the state of Bavaria since 2013.

== Early life and education ==
Alois Rainer was born in 1965 and grew up in Haibach in the Bavarian Forest. His father was Alois Rainer senior, a butcher, restauranteur and a politician.

Rainer inherited not only his father's butchery trade, but also his political career. Both began as mayors in the Lower Bavarian community of Haibach, which has a population of 8,000, before becoming members of the Bundestag.

Alois Rainer's older sister Gerda Hasselfeldt was also member of the German Bundestag for 30 years from 1987 to 2017 for CSU.

== Political career ==
Rainer first became a member of the Bundestag in the 2013 German federal election. In parliament, he served on the Budget Committee and the Audit Committee from 2013 to 2019; in this capacity, he was his parliamentary group’s rapporteur on the annual budget of the Federal Ministry of Family Affairs, Senior Citizens, Women and Youth. From 2019 to 2021 he was a member of the Committee on Transport and Digital Infrastructure, where he is his parliamentary group’s spokesperson. From 2021 to 2025, Rainer chaired the Finance Committee.

== Other activities ==
- KfW, Ex-Officio Member of the Supervisory Board (since 2025)

== Political positions ==
Upon taking office, Rainer emphasized his desire to ensure less bureaucracy, more freedom, more innovation, and greater social appreciation for agriculture. He did not elaborate on these points. The biodiversity crisis and the climate crisis were not mentioned.
