= Juso-Hochschulgruppen =

Student wing of the Young Socialists in the SPD

- Founded: 1 January 1973; 53 years ago
- Ideology: Social democracy
- Mother party: Social Democratic Party of Germany

The Juso-Hochschulgruppen (lit. 'Juso University Groups') are a part of the Young Socialists in the SPD and represent the student wing of the Social Democratic Party of Germany. They took over the role of the student wing after the party split with the Sozialistischer Deutscher Studentenbund in 1961 and its replacement, the Sozialdemokratischer Hochschulbund (SHB), had become too radical by 1972.
