= Federal Ministry of Agriculture, Food and Regional Identity =

Federal ministry in Germany

Federal Ministry of Agriculture, Food and Regional Identity (BMLEH)
- Bundesministerium für Landwirtschaft, Ernährung und Heimat

Agency overview
- Formed: 1949
- Jurisdiction: Government of Germany
- Headquarters: Rochusstr. 1, 53123 Bonn
- Employees: 920 (Feb. 2010)
- Annual budget: €7.676 billion (2021)
- Minister responsible: Alois Rainer
- Agency executives: Markus Schick, Permanent State Secretary; Silvia Breher, Parliamentary State Secretary; Martina Englhardt-Kopf, Parliamentary State Secretary
- Website: www.bmel.de

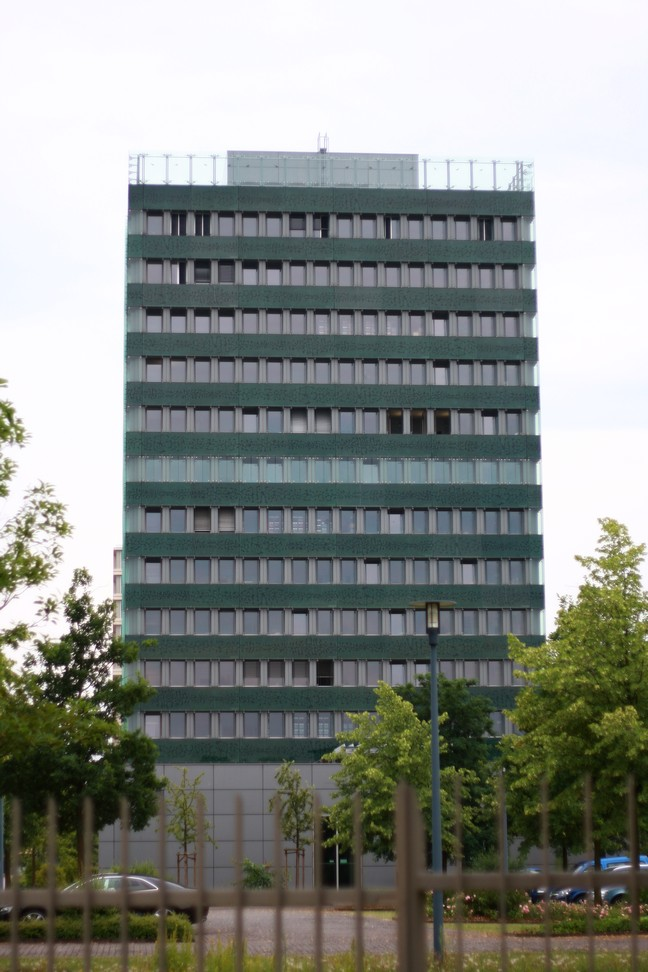
The BMEL headquarters in Bonn, Germany

The Federal Ministry of Agriculture, Food and Regional Identity (German: Bundesministerium für Landwirtschaft, Ernährung und Heimat; abbreviated BMLEH) is a cabinet-level ministry of the Federal Republic of Germany. Its primary headquarters are located in Bonn with a secondary office in Berlin. From 1949 to 2001 it was known as the Ministry for Food, Agriculture and Forests (Bundesministerium für Ernährung, Landwirtschaft und Forsten). Through an organizational order by the German Chancellor on 22 January 2001, it became the Federal Ministry for Consumer Protection, Food and Agriculture after the consumer protection function was transferred from the Federal Ministry for Health (Bundesministerium für Gesundheit). The name Federal Ministry for Food, Agriculture and Consumer Protection (Bundesministerium für Ernährung, Landwirtschaft und Verbraucherschutz) was adopted on 22 November 2005 simply to alphabetize its functional parts in the German language. Due to the political restructurings of the 18th German Bundestag in December 2013 the division "Consumer Protection" was transferred to the Federal Ministry of Justice and Consumer Protection.

== Organization ==
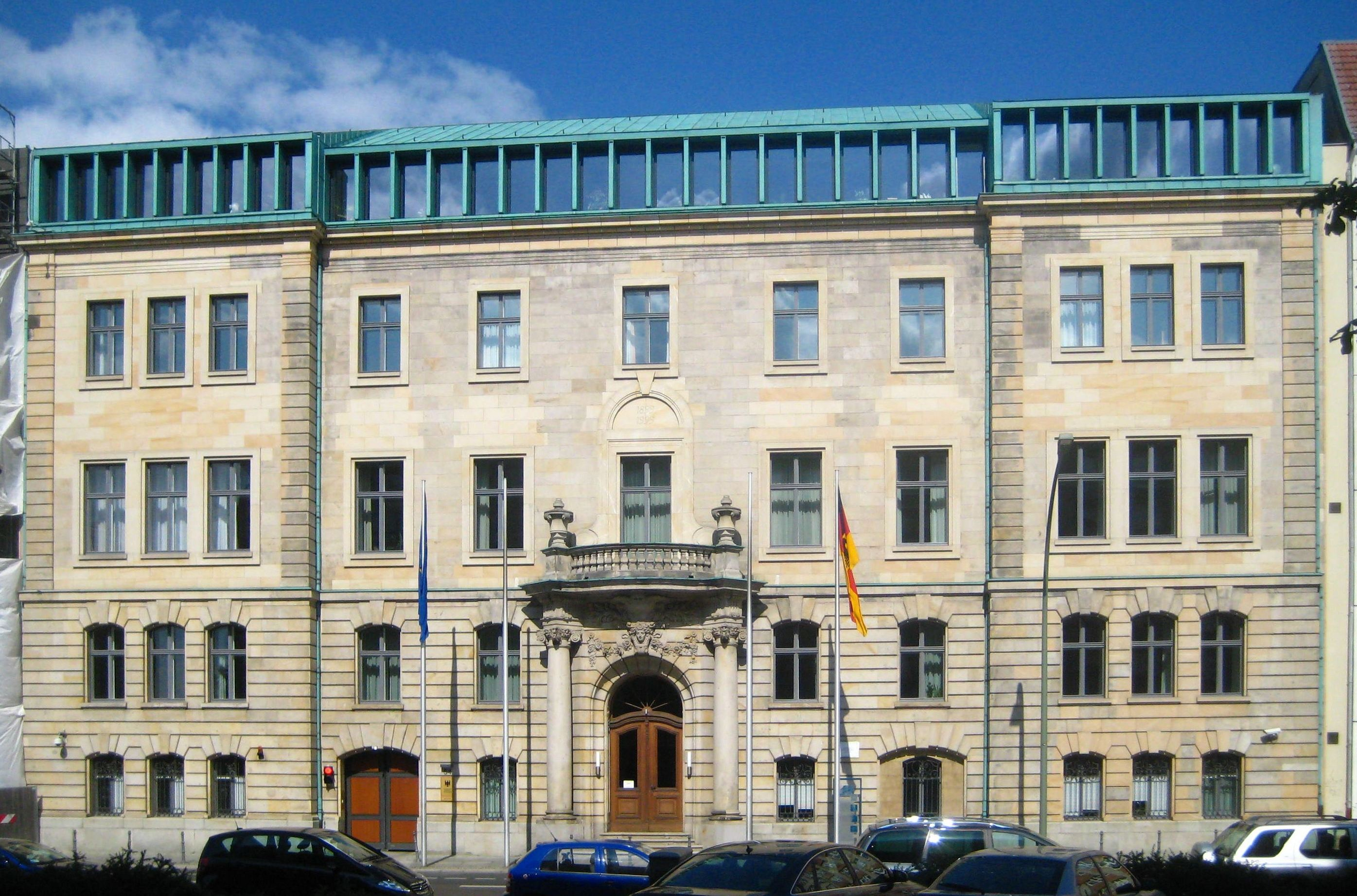
BMEL offices on Wilhelmstraße, Berlin

The current Minister for Food and Agriculture is Cem Özdemir. The Parliamentary State Secretaries are Silvia Bender, Claudia Müller (politician) and Ophelia Nick. In addition to the Ministry Management (including management staff), it consists of eight departments (as of September 2020):

- Department 1: Central Division
- Department 2: Consumer health protection, nutrition, product safety
- Department 3: Food safety, animal health
- Department 4: Agricultural markets, food industry, export
- Department 5: Forests, sustainability, renewable raw materials
- Department 6: EU affairs, international cooperation, fisheries
- Department 7: Agricultural production, horticulture, agricultural policy
- Department 8: Rural development, digital innovation

== Agencies ==
Under the auspices of the BMEL are various Federal agencies, legally independent institutions under public law and government research institutes:

- Federal Office of Consumer Protection and Food Safety
- Federal Agency for Agriculture and Food
- Federal Office of Plant Varieties
- Federal Institute for Risk Assessment (BfR)
- Julius Kühn-Institut, Federal Research Center for Cultivated Plants
- Friedrich-Loeffler-Institut, Federal Research Institute for Animal Health
- Max Rubner-Institut, Federal Research Institute for Nutrition and Food
- Johann Heinrich von Thünen-Institut, Federal Research Institute for Rural Areas, Forestry and Fisheries
- Agency for Renewable Resources

== Parliamentary State Secretaries ==
- 1969–1976: Fritz Logemann (FDP)
- 1976–1993: Georg Gallus (FDP)
- 1983–1991: Wolfgang von Geldern (CDU)
- 1991–1993: Gottfried Haschke (CDU)
- 1993–1998: Wolfgang Gröbl (CSU)
- 1998: Ernst Hinsken (CSU)
- 1998–2005: Gerald Thalheim (SPD)
- 2001–2005: Matthias Berninger (Alliance 90/The Greens)
- 2005–2007: Peter Paziorek (CDU)
- 2005–2013: Gerd Müller (CSU)
- 2007–2009: Ursula Heinen (CDU)
- 2009–2011: Julia Klöckner (CDU)
- 2011–2018: Peter Bleser (CDU)
- 2013–2018: Maria Flachsbarth (CDU)
- 2018–2021: Hans-Joachim Fuchtel (CDU)
- 2018–2019: Michael Stübgen (CDU)
- 2019–2021: Uwe Feiler (CDU)
- 2021–2022: Manuela Rottmann (Alliance 90/The Greens)
- 2021-2025: Ophelia Nick (Alliance 90/The Greens)
- 2023-2025: Claudia Müller (Alliance 90/The Greens)
- since 2025: Silvia Breher (CDU)
- since 2025: Martina Englhardt-Kopf (CSU)

== See also ==
- List of federal ministers of food, agriculture and consumer protection (Germany)
- Julius Kühn-Institut
- Federal Institute for Risk Assessment (BfR)
