= Erhard Grundl =

German politician (born 1963)

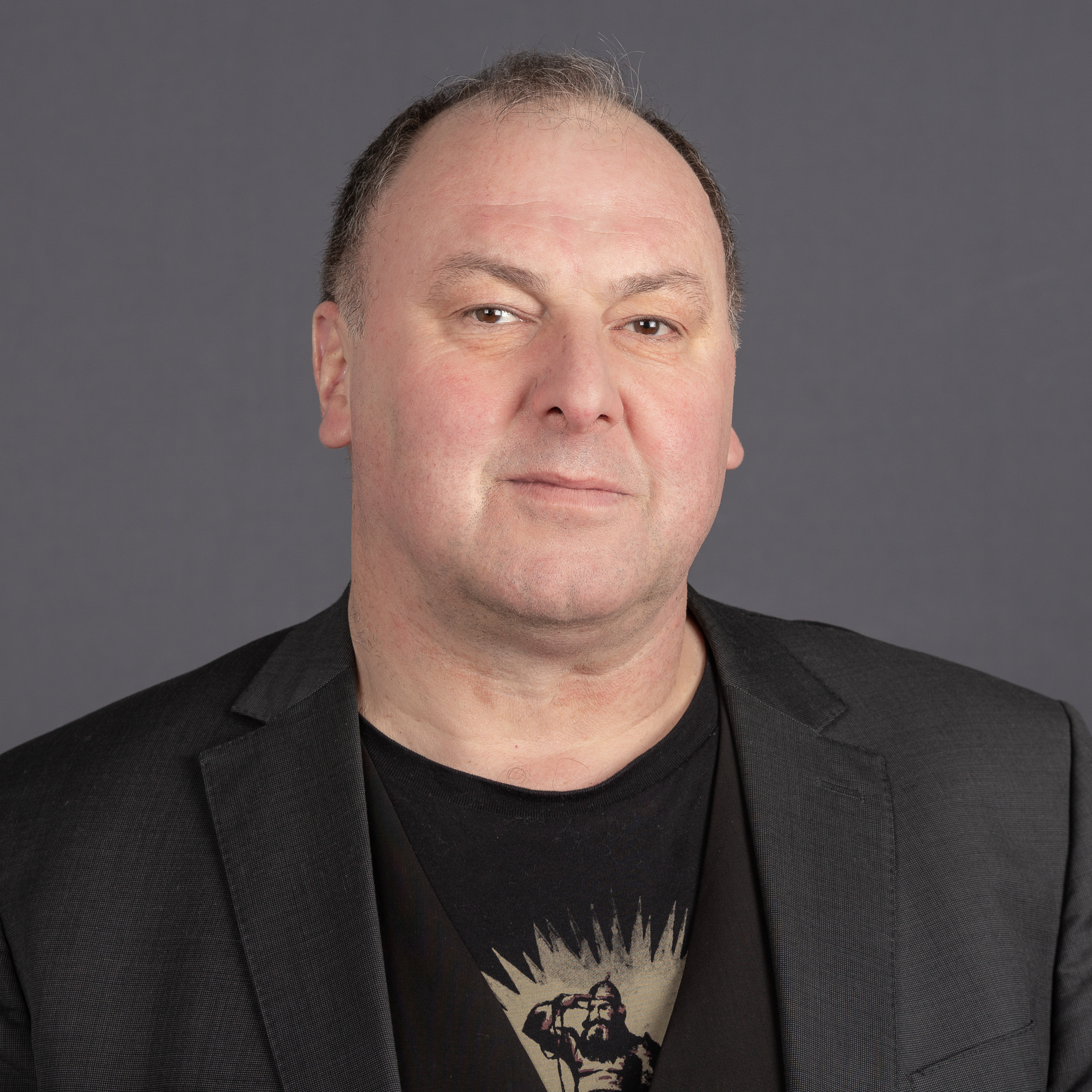
- Erhard Grundl in 2020

Member of the Bundestag
- Incumbent
- Assumed office 2017

Personal details
- Born: 7 January 1963 (age 63) Mallersdorf, Germany
- Party: Greens
- Children: 2

Erhard Grundl (born 7 January 1963) is a German politician of the Alliance 90/The Greens who has been serving as a member of the Bundestag from the state of Bavaria since 2017.

== Early life and career ==
After attending the Burkhart-Gymnasium in Mallersdorf-Pfaffenberg and the Staatliche Fachoberschule Straubing, Grundl began studying social education at the Fachhochschule Regensburg in 1985, which he left without graduating in 1987. From 1987 to 1997, he was a member of the rock band "Baby You Know" and from 1991 to 2017, he worked as a sales manager in the music industry.

== Political career ==
Grundl first became a member of the Bundestag in the 2017 German Federal Election. In parliament, he is a member of the Committee on Culture and the Media and spokesman for his group on cultural policy. He is also a member of the Sports Committee.

== Other activities ==
- German Federal Cultural Foundation, Member of the Board of Trustees
- Memorial to the Murdered Jews of Europe Foundation, Member of the Board of Trustees (since 2022)
- Tarabya Cultural Academy, Member of the Advisory Board (since 2022)
- Haus der Geschichte, Member of the Board of Trustees (2020–2022)
- German United Services Trade Union (ver.di), Member
