= Heiligenhaus =

- Town
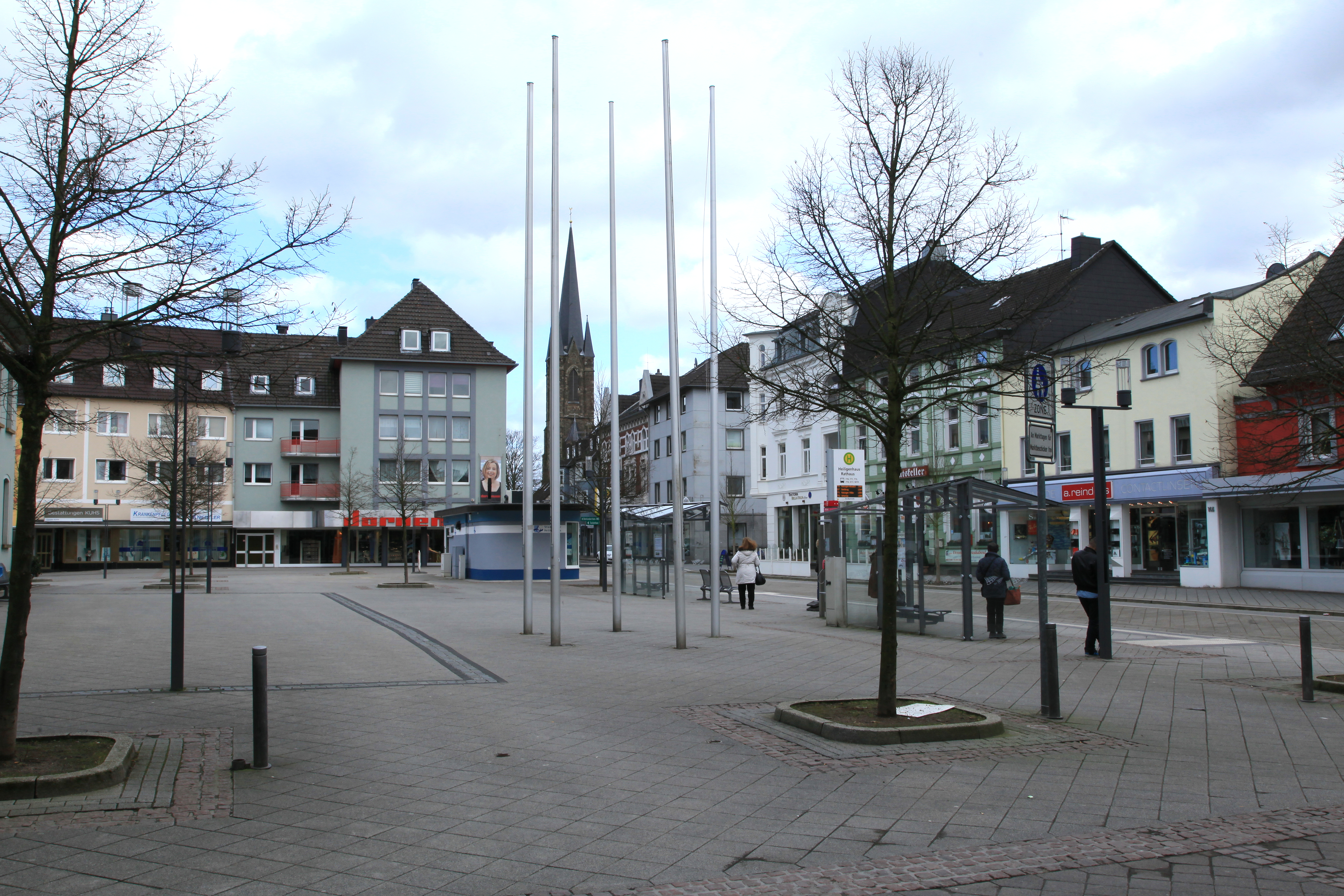

- Coat of arms

- Location of Heiligenhaus within Mettmann district
- Interactive map of Heiligenhaus
- Location within Germany Location within North Rhine-Westphalia
- Coordinates: 51°19′N 6°58′E
- Country: Germany
- State: North Rhine-Westphalia
- Admin. region: Düsseldorf
- District: Mettmann
- Subdivisions: 6

Government
  - Mayor (2025–30): Björn Kerkmann (CDU)

Area
  - Total: 27.52 km^{2} (10.63 sq mi)
- Elevation: 180 m (590 ft)

Population (2025-12-31)
  - Total: 25,844
  - Density: 939.1/km^{2} (2,432/sq mi)
- Time zone: UTC+01:00 (CET)
  - Summer (DST): UTC+02:00 (CEST)
- Postal codes: 42579
- Dialling codes: 02056, 02054, 02102
- Vehicle registration: ME
- Website: www.heiligenhaus.de

Heiligenhaus (German pronunciation: [ˈhaɪlɪɡn̩ˌhaʊs]; Limburgish: Hillijehoes) is a town in the district of Mettmann, in North Rhine-Westphalia, Germany, in the suburban Rhine-Ruhr area. It lies between Düsseldorf and Essen.

Bochum University of Applied Sciences (Hochschule Bochum, formerly Fachhochschule Bochum) has a branch in Heiligenhaus for the development of locking Systems.

Heiligenhaus also contains the ancestral family farm of the acclaimed American author John Steinbeck.

== Population ==
Historical population

Year	Pop.	±% p.a.
1965	26,854	—
1970	29,112	+1.63%
1975	29,886	+0.53%
1980	29,649	−0.16%
1985	28,514	−0.78%
1990	29,715	+0.83%
1995	29,487	−0.15%

Year	Pop.	±% p.a.
2000	28,442	−0.72%
2005	27,750	−0.49%
2010	26,659	−0.80%
2015	25,793	−0.66%
2020	26,301	+0.39%
2025	25,844	−0.35%

Source: Landesdatabank Nordrhein-Westfalen

== Twin towns – sister cities ==
Heiligenhaus is twinned with:

- Basildon, England, United Kingdom
- Mansfield, England, United Kingdom
- Meaux, France
- Zwönitz, Germany
