= Mettmann (district) =

Coordinates: 51°15′N 7°00′E

- District
- Flag Coat of arms
- Country: Germany
- State: North Rhine-Westphalia
- Adm. region: Düsseldorf
- Capital: Mettmann

Government
  - District admin.: Bettina Warnecke (CDU)

Area
  - Total: 407.09 km^{2} (157.18 sq mi)

Population (31 December 2023)
  - Total: 489,760
  - Density: 1,203.1/km^{2} (3,116.0/sq mi)
- Time zone: UTC+01:00 (CET)
  - Summer (DST): UTC+02:00 (CEST)
- Vehicle registration: ME
- Website: www.kreis-mettmann.de

Mettmann (German pronunciation: [ˈmɛtman]) is a Kreis (district) in the middle of North Rhine-Westphalia, Germany. Neighboring are the Ennepe-Ruhr, Rhein-Kreis Neuss, Rheinisch-Bergischer Kreis and the district-free cities Cologne, Leverkusen, Wuppertal, Solingen, Düsseldorf, Duisburg, Mülheim, Essen. It is the most densely populated rural district in Germany; it borders Düsseldorf Airport in the northwestern district borders, on the city limits of Ratingen, and is also near Cologne Bonn Airport. It was named after Mettmann, its district seat.

== History ==
In the 12th century the area of today's district became the property of the earldom Berg. When Napoleon occupied the area in 1792 it became a canton in the arrondissement Düsseldorf.

After the Congress of Vienna the area went to Prussia in 1816 as part of the province Westphalia, and the first district Mettmann was created. This district was merged from 1820 till 1861 with the district Elberfeld, which then became a city in its own right, now it is part of Wuppertal. In 1877 the administrative seat was moved to Vohwinkel. In 1929 more of the area was given over to Wuppertal, and the district was merged with the district Düsseldorf (Landkreis, excluding the city itself), to form the district Düsseldorf-Mettmann, with administrative seat in Düsseldorf. In 1952 the seat went back to Mettmann, and after the last reorganization of 1975/76 the district got back the old name. The cities Langenfeld and Monheim were included into the district then, while Kettwig became part of the city Essen.

== Geography ==
The district Mettmann is located just south of the Ruhr area, next to the big cities of Düsseldorf, Essen and Wuppertal.

Most famous is the valley of the small river Düssel, the Neanderthal, where the fossils of the human species Neanderthals were first found.

Clickable map of towns and municipalities in the district

== Coat of arms ==
The red lion with the blue tongue is the sign of the earldom Berg. In the black border it has the symbols for the two most important industries of the district - the production of locks, and agriculture. The coat of arms was designed in 1936 by the painter and herald Pagenstecher from Düsseldorf.

== Towns and municipalities ==
1. Erkrath
2. Haan
3. Heiligenhaus
4. Hilden
5. Langenfeld
6. Mettmann
7. Monheim am Rhein
8. Ratingen
9. Velbert
10. Wülfrath
