= Perlbach (Regen) =

Location
- Country: Germany
- State: Bavaria
- Districts: Straubing-Bogen and Cham
- Reference no.: DE: 152294

Physical characteristics
- Source
  - location: south of Zinzenzell
  - coordinates: 49°04′01″N 12°34′37″E
  - elevation: over 655 m above sea level (NN)
- Mouth
  - location: west of Wiesing from left and south into the Regen
  - coordinates: 49°10′37″N 12°28′37″E
  - elevation: under 353 m above sea level (NN)
- Length: 26.21 km
- Basin size: 82.43 km²

Basin features
- Progression: Regen → Danube → Black Sea
- River system: Danube
- Landmarks: Small towns: Roding; Villages: Wiesenfelden, Michelsneukirchen, Falkenstein, Zell

The Perlbach is a river in Bavaria in the provinces of Lower Bavaria and Upper Palatinate, which drains into the Regen west of Wiesing in the borough of Roding in the Upper Palatine county of Cham.

== Name ==
On the Lower Bavarian side and up to Falkenstein the Perlbach is still called by its original name of Miethnach. That the name Miethnach is the older, is indicated by the name of the hamlet Mietnach am Perlbach (between Marienstein and Trasching), west of the Zinzenberg.

== Course ==
The Perlbach rises in the Lower Bavarian county of Straubing-Bogen south of Zinzenzell between Geraszell and the Edenhof. It flows, roughly speaking, northwestwards; its upper course more or less constantly, while its lower course runs in a large, roughly semi-circular arc towards the southwest and back. Early on it enters the Upper Palatine county of Cham, in which it remains until it reaches its mouth near Wiesing and empties into the Regen.

Its larger tributaries are the left-hand Geißbach which joins it near Völling, the left-hand Urbachl near Au and the longest, last and right-hand Neudecker Bach just after Trasching.
