= Max Feldbauer =

German painter (1869–1948)

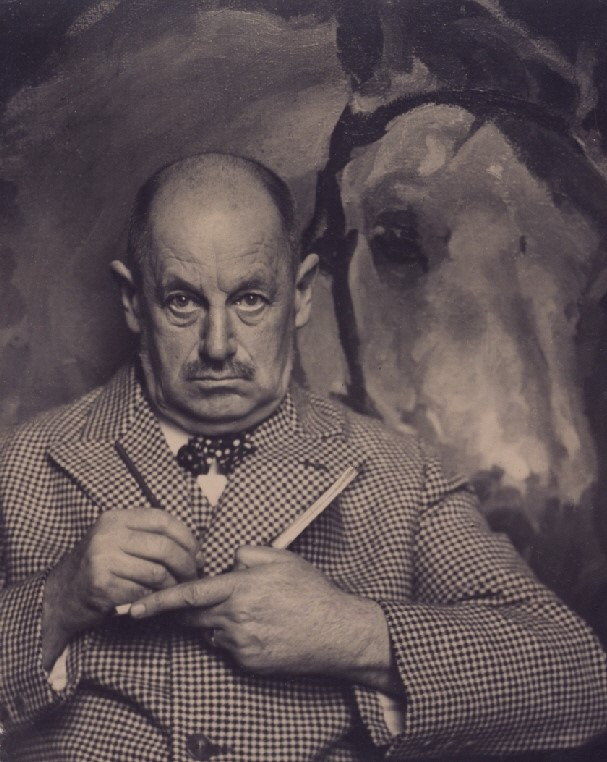
- Photograph by Hugo Erfurth (1930)
- Born: 14 February 1869; Neumarkt in der Oberpfalz
- Died: 20 November 1948 (aged 79); Münchshöfen
- Occupation: Artist

Olympic medal record

Art competitions
Bronze medal – third place	1928 Amsterdam	Graphic works

Max Feldbauer (1869–1948) was a German painter, associated with the Munich Secession. He is primarily known for rural, Bavarian scenes.

== Life and work ==
His father, Josef Feldbauer, served as the mayor of Neumarkt from 1868 to 1876. After his father and his five younger siblings had died, he and his mother moved to Munich. His first art lessons were at the Kunstgewerbeschule. He then attended the private art school operated by Simon Hollósy, where he was introduced to Impressionism, and continued his studies at the Academy of Fine Arts, Munich. His instructors there included Otto Seitz, Paul Hoecker and Johann Caspar Herterich.

In 1899, he married the painter, Elise Eigner, of Schwandorf. From 1901 to 1915, he taught at the Academy of the Münchner Künstlerinnenverein (women artists' association). In 1908, he joined the Munich Secession. He also ran his own painting school, in Mitterndorf, near the Dachau art colony, from 1912 to 1922. He left the Secession in 1913; becoming one of the founders of the New Secession, and served as a board member. In addition to all of these activities, he provided illustrations for Die Jugend (Youth), a weekly arts magazine.

After several trips through France and Italy, he settled near Dachau. In 1916, he was appointed to teach at the Kunstgewerbeschule Dresden (arts and crafts school) then, in 1918, to the Dresden Academy of Fine Arts, where he served as President in 1928. After the Nazis came to power in 1933, he was initially banned from exhibiting.

He returned to Munich, but was bombed out of his home in 1944. Ironically, that same year, he was included on the "Gottbegnadeten-Liste" (God given list) of artists who were considered crucial to Nazi culture. Unable to find another home, he moved to Oberschneiding, where he died four years later.

His works may be seen at the Gemäldegalerie Alte Meister, Bayerische Staatsgemäldesammlungen, Staatliche Graphische Sammlung, and the Städtische Galerie im Lenbachhaus, among others.

== Selected paintings ==
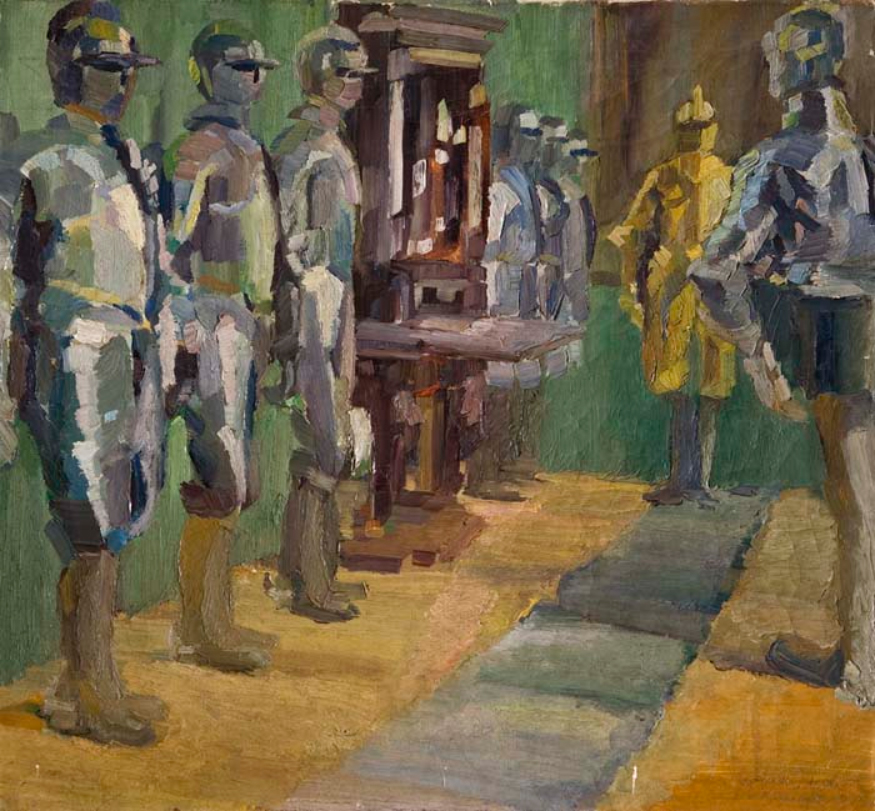
Roll Call of the Armored Unit

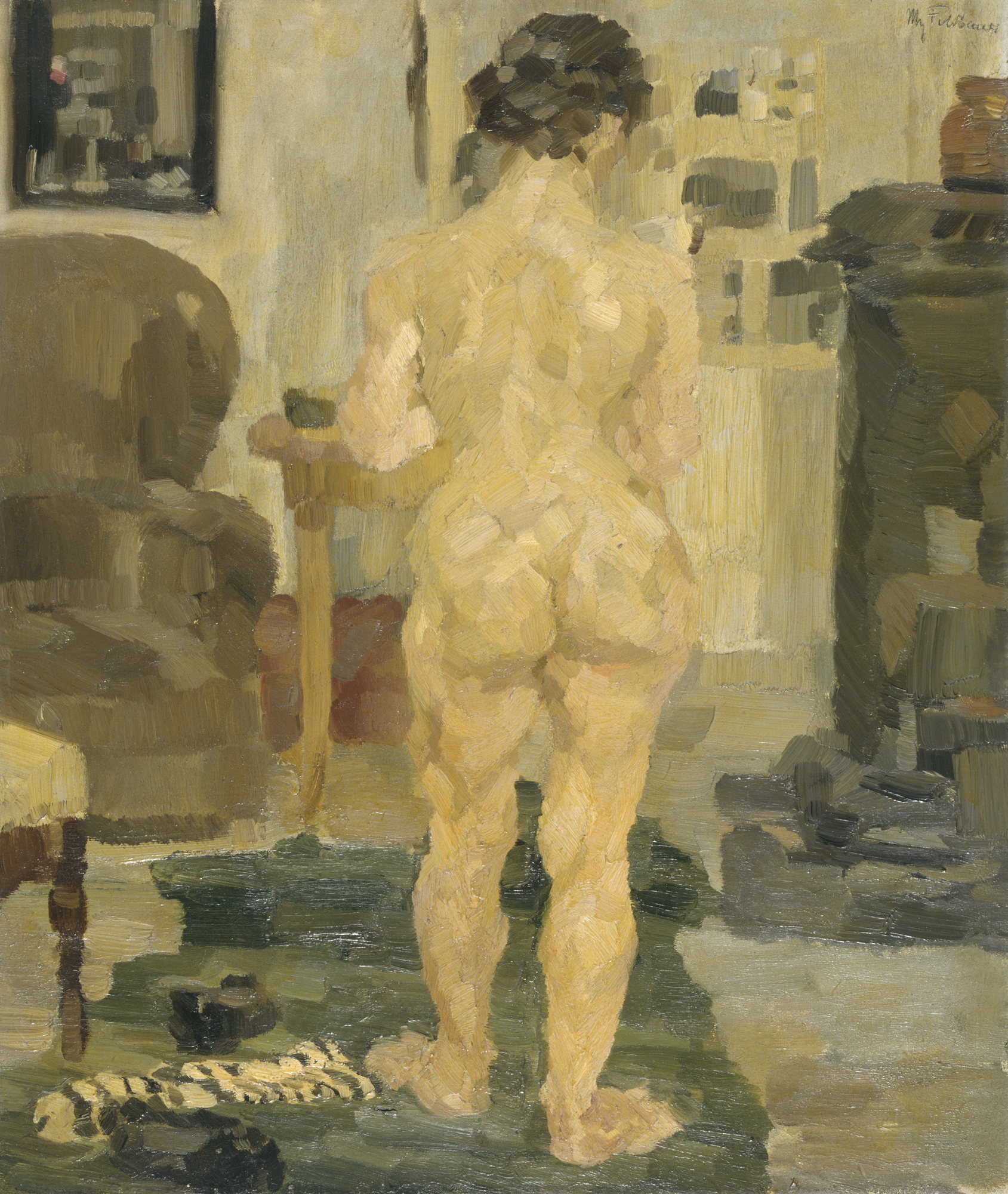
Nude at the Oven

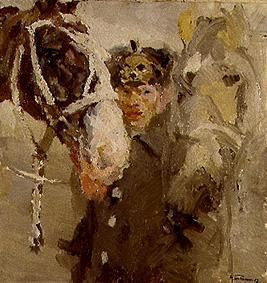
Hussar

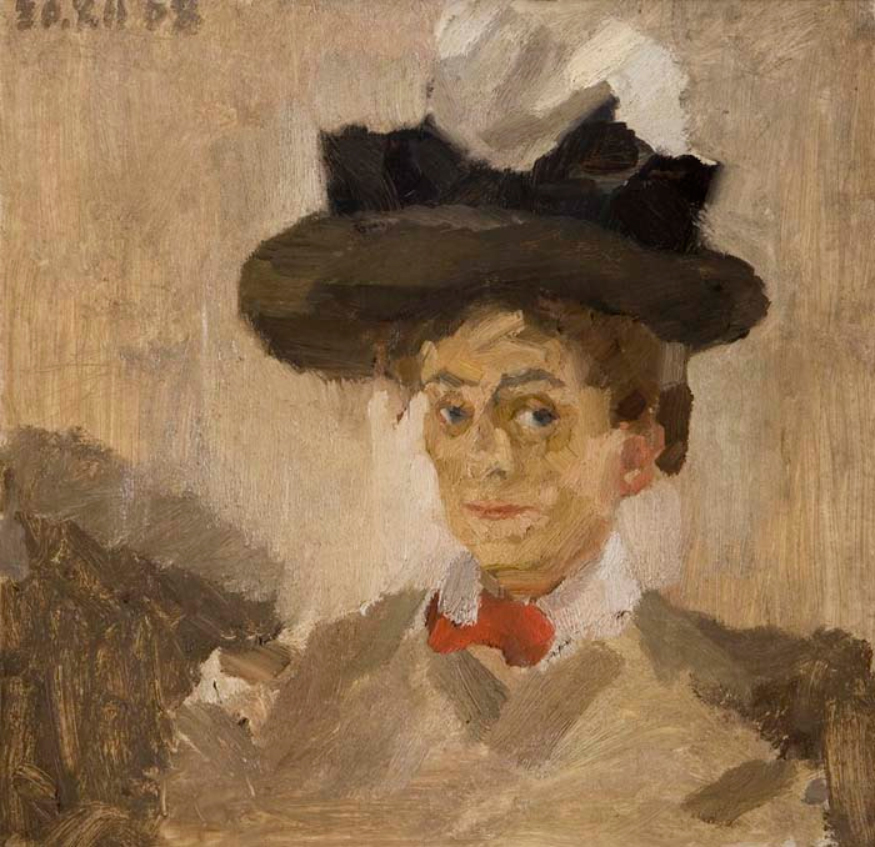
Portrait of his wife, Elise
