= Zinzenzell =

- Ortsteil of Wiesenfelden
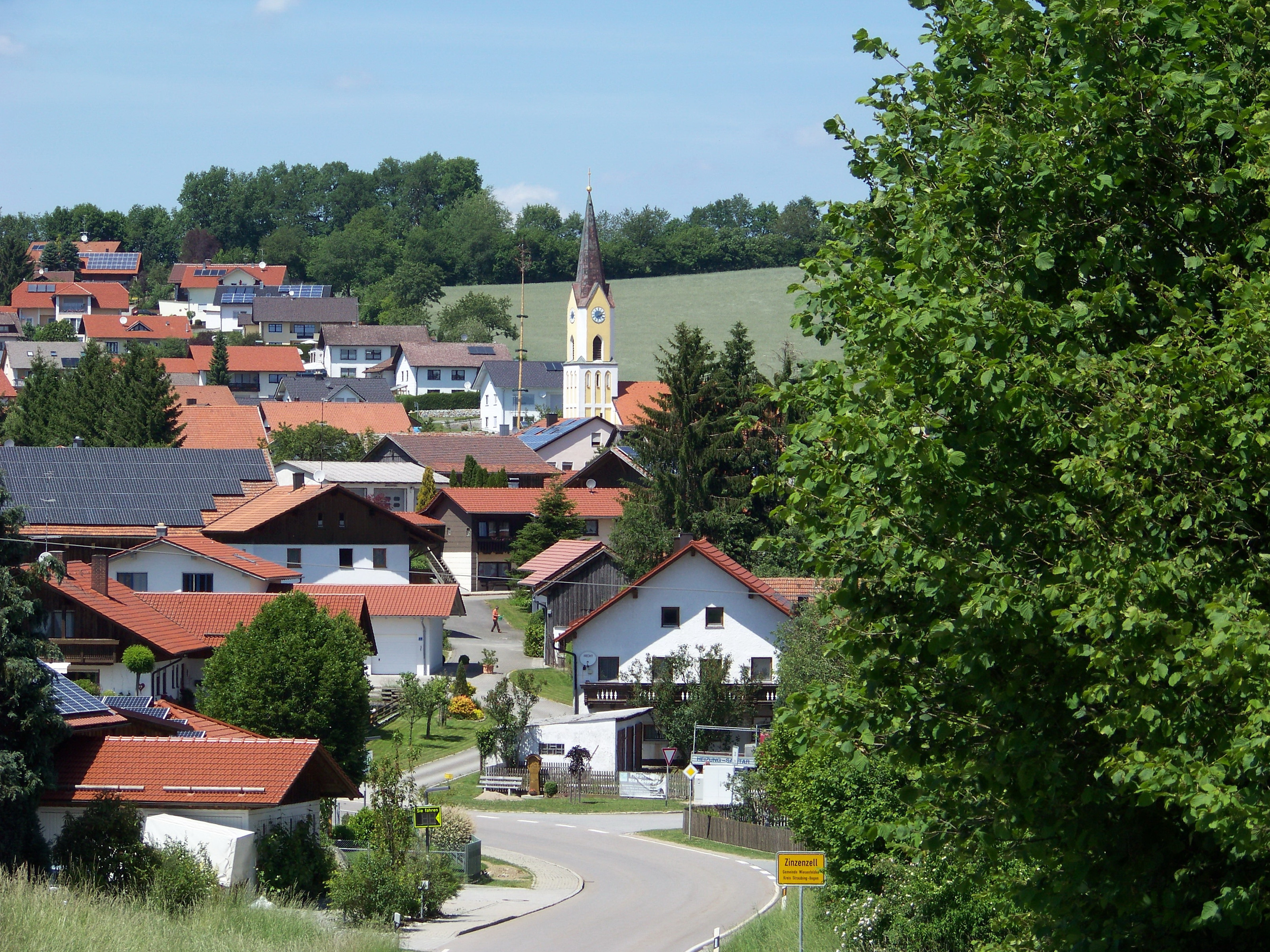
- View of Zinzenzell with the Church of Saint Michael

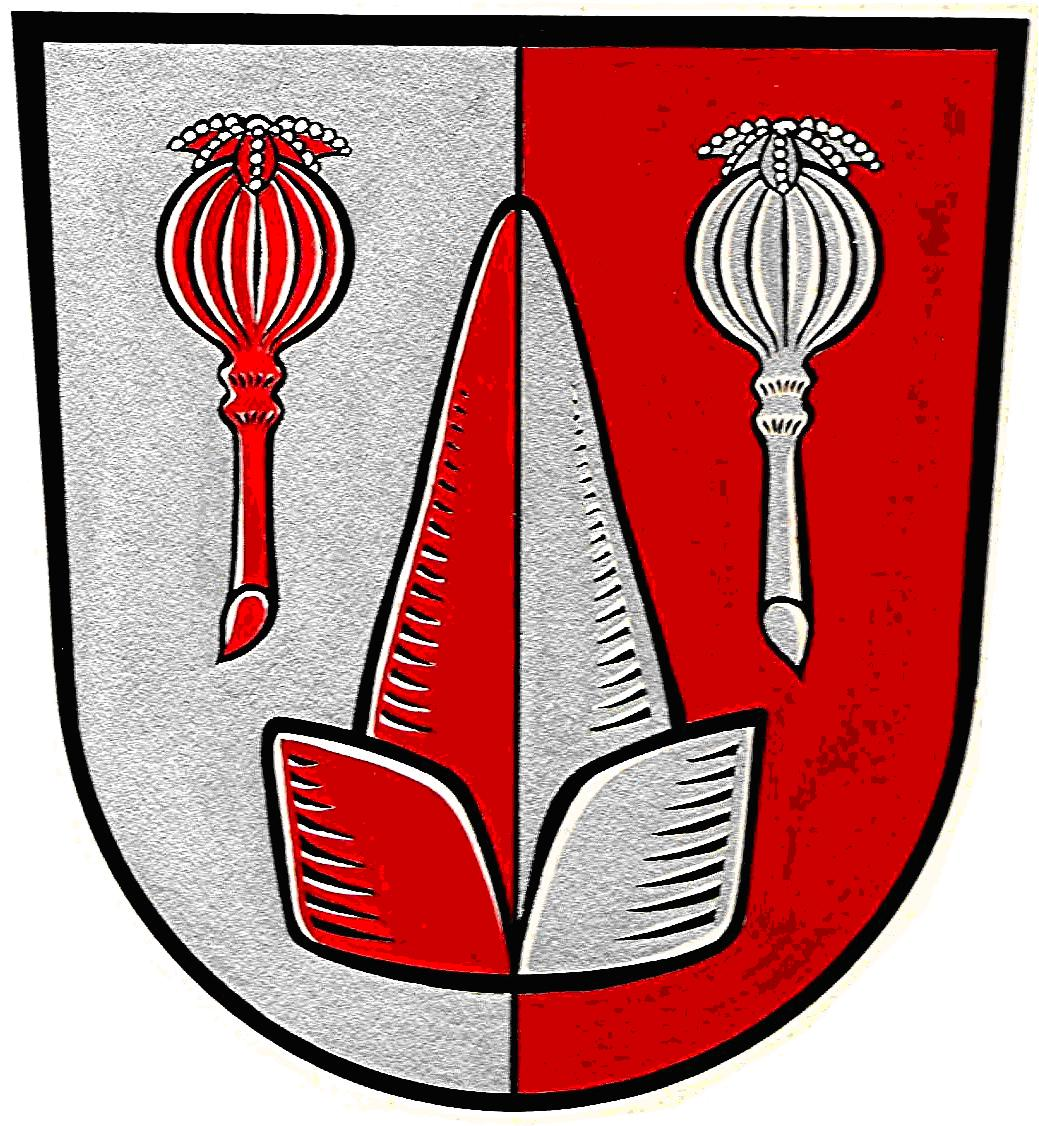
- Coat of arms
- Interactive map of Zinzenzell
- Location within Germany Location within Bavaria
- Coordinates: 49°4.6′N 12°34.7′E
- Country: Germany
- State: Bavaria
- Admin. region: Niederbayern
- District: Straubing-Bogen
- Municipality: Wiesenfelden
- Elevation: 647 m (2,123 ft)

Population (1987)
  - Total: 335
- Time zone: UTC+01:00 (CET)
  - Summer (DST): UTC+02:00 (CEST)

Zinzenzell is a village and a former municipality with about 350 inhabitants in Lower Bavaria, Germany. The village and most of the former municipality have been part of the municipality Wiesenfelden since 1978.

== History ==
Between 1114 and 1137 Zinzenzell was first mentioned in the annals of the Oberaltaich Abbey. From 1818 to 1978, the village was the seat of the municipality of the same name. On 1 May 1978, the territory of the municipality Zinzenzell (then 1437 hectares with 611 inhabitants) was divided between the municipalities Wiesenfelden and Stallwang, after the application of the community Zinzenzell had been refused membership in the administrative community Stallwang by the Government of Lower Bavaria.

== Coat of arms of the municipality Zinzenzell ==
The coat of arms is derived from the coat of arms of the Zinzenzeller (shield split in silver and red) and the Barons of Magerl.
