= Aiterhofen =

- Municipality
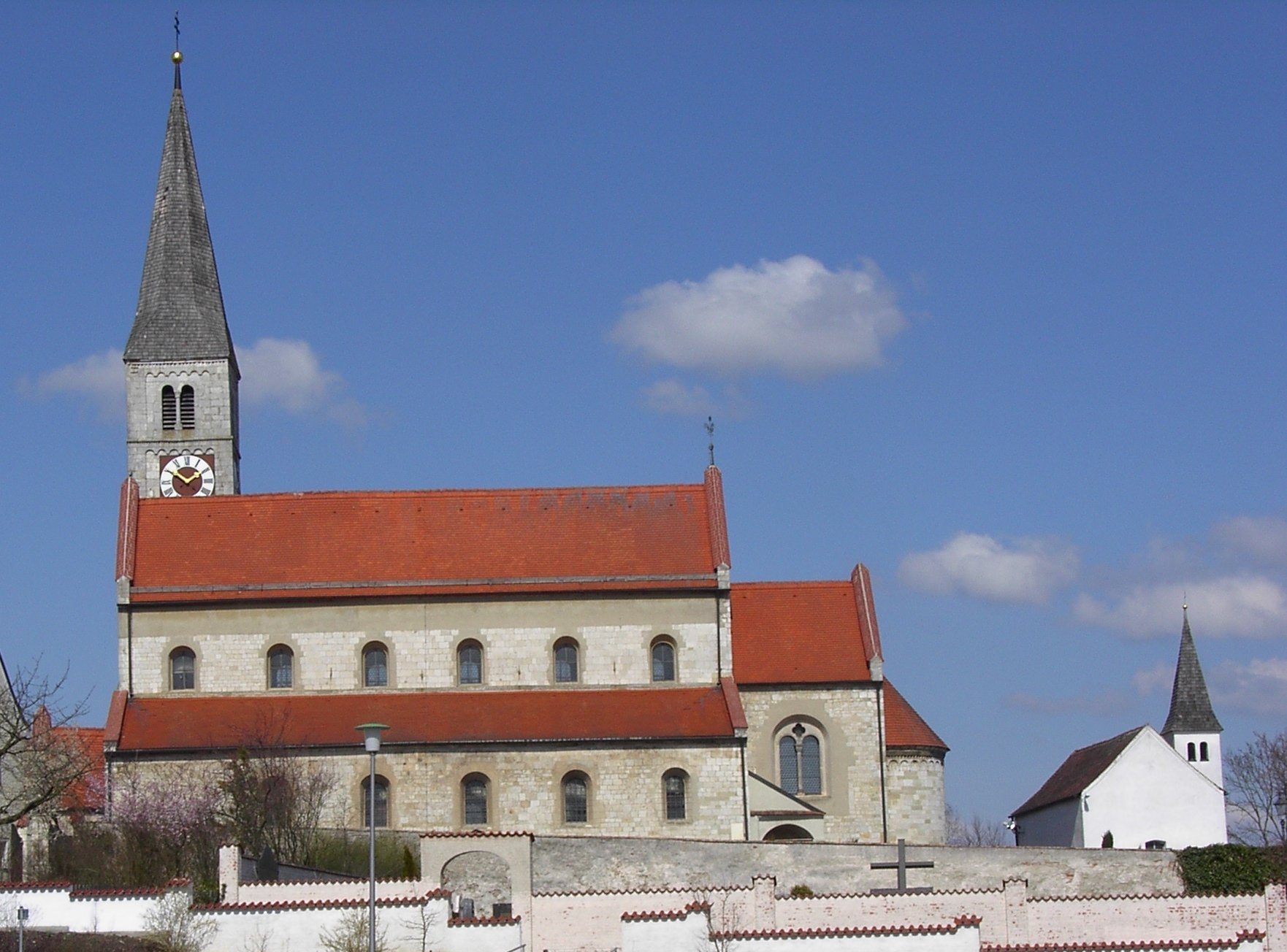
- Church of Saint Margaret

- Coat of arms

- Location of Aiterhofen within Straubing-Bogen district
- Interactive map of Aiterhofen
- Location within Germany Location within Bavaria
- Coordinates: 48°51′N 12°37′E
- Country: Germany
- State: Bavaria
- Admin. region: Niederbayern
- District: Straubing-Bogen
- Municipal assoc.: Aiterhofen

Government
  - Mayor (2020–26): Adalbert Hösl (CSU)

Area
  - Total: 43.09 km^{2} (16.64 sq mi)
- Elevation: 339 m (1,112 ft)

Population (2025-12-31)
  - Total: 3,550
  - Density: 82.4/km^{2} (213/sq mi)
- Time zone: UTC+01:00 (CET)
  - Summer (DST): UTC+02:00 (CEST)
- Postal codes: 94330
- Dialling codes: 09421
- Vehicle registration: SR
- Website: www.aiterhofen.de

Aiterhofen (German pronunciation: [aɪtɐˈhoːfn̩]) is a municipality in the district of Straubing-Bogen in Bavaria, Germany.

It is located about 5 km southeast of Straubing in the Gäuboden.

== History ==
Aiterhofen has been settled since the Neolithic Era as the discovery of the largest cemetery of the Linear Pottery culture in Germany (about 260 tombs) has shown.

In 773, Aiterhofen (Eitraha) is documented as the residence of one of the Agilolfing Dukes. Around 973, another documentation as Eitarahoue (Farmyard at the Eiterach) exists. An Annalist of the 11th century falsely interpreted the name as Farmyard of Poison (poison = pus = Eiter). The actual meaning comes from the indogermanic oid for swelling, the old high German aha for water and hof for farmyard. Therefore, the meaning of the name can be interpreted as estate at the swelling stream, which shows the reference to the Aiterach River.

Approximately in the first quarter of the 13th century the Roman Catholic parish church St. Margaretha was constructed. The church has the oldest bell in lower bavaria (1325). Only the northern tower of what wasinitially planned as a twin towers church was constructed. In 1883 the Rococo furnishings from the 18th century were removed. The adjacent grave yard chapel was probably constructed during the 17th century.

In 1846, Angela Fraundorfer founded the Franciscan Convent of Aiterhofen, which, among other things, was aimed at the education of girls. It currently operates a kindergarten, a female-only secondary school and several other facilities.

=== Citizen Development ===
Some recent population figures of the municipality are as follows: 1970 2.424, 1987 2.749, 2000 3.178, 2005 3.466, 2008 3.422

== Politics ==
The current mayor is Adalbert Hösl (CSU). Recent municipal tax income was about 2.5 million €, with 600,000 due to trade taxes.

=== Buildings ===
Churches

- St. Margaretha was constructed approximately in the first quarter of the 13th century. The interior of the Roman Catholic church was converted to a Baroque (Rococo) style in the 18th century. It was redesigned to an Art Nouveau style in the 19th century.
- St. Peter und Paul in Geltolfing. The present construction was started by Jakob Ruesch in 1715, though a church at its location had already been documented in 1226.
- St. Johannes in Niederharthausen was constructed in the early Gothic style, but today only the choir with its rib vault is preserved.
- Klosterkirche Aiterhofen, the church of the Franciscan Convent.

== Economy and infrastructure ==
=== Economy, Agriculture and Forestry ===
In 1998, there were 31 agricultural, 133 craftsmen and 62 trading and/or traveling locally employed. 132 enterprises were registered in other fields.

Overall 1,022 employees are registered as living in Aiterhofen.

There were no secondary industries and there are 4 construction and building industries.

In 1999, 96 agricultural industries with a cultivated area of 3.517 hectares, consisting of 3.431 hectares of agricultural crop land and 82 hectares of permanently grassed areas, were recorded.

=== Education ===
In 2006, the following facilities existed:

- a four-grouped kindergarten „Maria Schutz“
- one elementary school
- the Angela Fraundorfer secondary school with its attached boarding school (funded by the Franciscan Convent of Aiterhofen)
- a vocational school for elderly care (funded by the Franciscan Convent of Aiterhofen)
