= Straßkirchen =

- Municipality
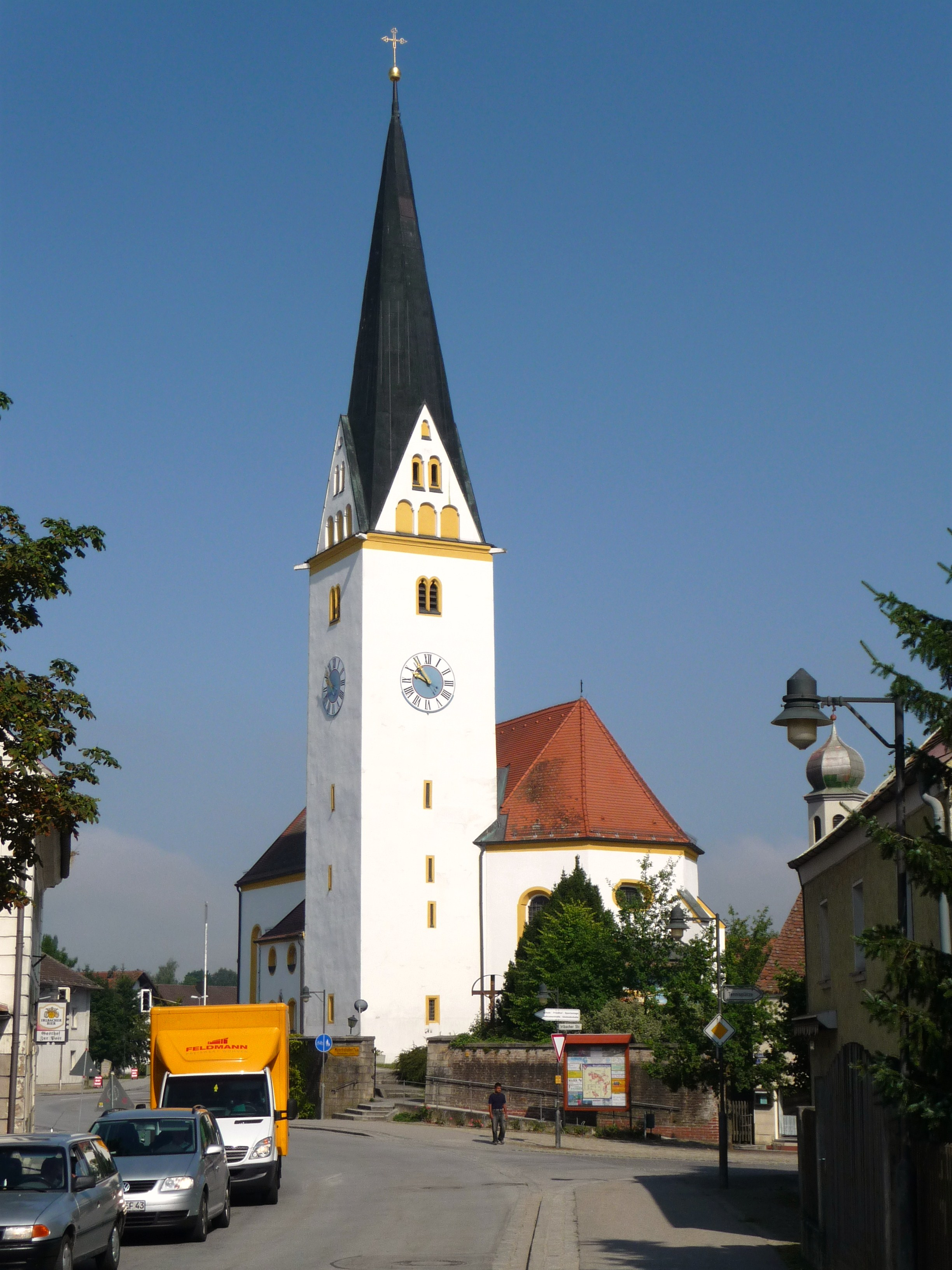
- Church of Saint Stephen

- Coat of arms

- Location of Straßkirchen within Straubing-Bogen district
- Interactive map of Straßkirchen
- Location within Germany Location within Bavaria
- Coordinates: 48°50′N 12°43′E
- Country: Germany
- State: Bavaria
- Admin. region: Niederbayern
- District: Straubing-Bogen
- Municipal assoc.: Straßkirchen

Government
  - Mayor (2020–26): Christian Hirtreiter (CSU)

Area
  - Total: 38.4 km^{2} (14.8 sq mi)
- Elevation: 324 m (1,063 ft)

Population (2025-12-31)
  - Total: 3,473
  - Density: 90.4/km^{2} (234/sq mi)
- Time zone: UTC+01:00 (CET)
  - Summer (DST): UTC+02:00 (CEST)
- Postal codes: 94342
- Dialling codes: 09424
- Vehicle registration: SR
- Website: www.strasskirchen.de

Straßkirchen (German pronunciation: [ʃtʁaːsˈkɪʁçn̩]) is a municipality in the district of Straubing-Bogen in Bavaria in Germany.

Straßkirchen has (in 2025) a population of around 3,500 and covers an area of 38.4 km² (90 inhabitants per km²).

The municipality is situated in the Danube Forest region and in the Gäuboden. The Danube flows past Straßkirchen at a distance of approximately three kilometres.

Between 2024 and 2026, BMW built an assembly plant in Straßkirchen to produce high-voltage batteries for electric cars. The plant cost over 1 billion euros and was opened on 1 October 2026.
