= Rattenberg, Bavaria =

Rattenberg
- Municipality
- Coat of arms

- Location of Rattenberg within Straubing-Bogen district
- Interactive map of Rattenberg
- Location within Germany Location within Bavaria
- Coordinates: 49°05′15″N 12°45′04″E
- Country: Germany
- State: Bavaria
- Admin. region: Niederbayern
- District: Straubing-Bogen

Government
  - Mayor (2020–26): Dieter Schröfl (CSU)

Area
  - Total: 30.22 km^{2} (11.67 sq mi)
- Elevation: 560 m (1,840 ft)

Population (2025-12-31)
  - Total: 1,633
  - Density: 54.04/km^{2} (140.0/sq mi)
- Time zone: UTC+01:00 (CET)
  - Summer (DST): UTC+02:00 (CEST)
- Postal codes: 94371
- Dialling codes: 09963
- Vehicle registration: SR
- Website: www.rattenberg.de

Rattenberg (German pronunciation: [ˈʁatn̩bɛʁk]) is a municipality in the district of Straubing-Bogen in Bavaria, Germany.
