= Straubing-Bogen =

Coordinates: 48°55′N 12°35′E

- District
- Flag Coat of arms
- Country: Germany
- State: Bavaria
- Adm. region: Lower Bavaria
- Capital: Straubing

Government
  - District admin.: Josef Laumer (CSU)

Area
  - Total: 1,202.24 km^{2} (464.19 sq mi)

Population (31 December 2025)
  - Total: 103,104
  - Density: 85.7599/km^{2} (222.117/sq mi)
- Time zone: UTC+01:00 (CET)
  - Summer (DST): UTC+02:00 (CEST)
- Vehicle registration: SR, BOG, MAL
- Website: www.landkreis-straubing-bogen.de

Straubing-Bogen is a Landkreis (district) in the eastern part of Bavaria, Germany. Neighboring districts are (from the north clockwise) Cham, Regen, Deggendorf, Dingolfing-Landau, Landshut and Regensburg. The independent town of Straubing is surrounded by the district. The seat of the government of the district (Landratsamt) is located in Straubing.

The only towns within the district itself are Bogen and Geiselhöring.

== Geography ==
The main river is the Danube, which crosses the district from the west to the east. There are two major geographical regions in the district. One is the Gäuboden with the Danube region and lowlands, the other are the mountains of the Bavarian Forest (Bayerische Wald).

== History ==
The district was created in 1972 by merging the previous districts of Straubing and Bogen and parts of the Mallersdorf district.

== Coat of arms ==
The coat of arms is based on the coat of arms of the former district Straubing. At the bottom are the white-and-blue diamonds as the symbol of Bavaria, as the Wittelsbach inherited them as their coat of arms upon the extinction of the Counts of Bogen. Above them the wavy line symbolizes the river Danube. The grain ears in the top part stand of the mostly agricultural structure of the district. The Madonna in the middle was added after the merger with the district Bogen, and stands for the St. Mary pilgrimate in Bogenberg.

== Towns and municipalities ==
Clickable map of towns and municipalities in the district

Towns
1. Bogen
2. Geiselhöring

Markt

1. Mallersdorf-Pfaffenberg
Municipalities
1. Feldkirchen
2. Haibach
3. Kirchroth
4. Konzell
5. Laberweinting
6. Leiblfing

7. Oberschneiding
8. Parkstetten
9. Rattenberg
10. Sankt Englmar
11. Steinach
12. Wiesenfelden

Verwaltungsgemeinschaften
1. Aiterhofen; 1. Aiterhofen^{1}; 2. Salching; 2. Hunderdorf; 1. Hunderdorf^{1}; 2. Neukirchen; 3. Windberg	3. Mitterfels; 1. Ascha; 2. Falkenfels; 3. Haselbach; 4. Mitterfels^{1,2}	4. Rain; 1. Aholfing; 2. Atting; 3. Perkam; 4. Rain^{1}	5. Schwarzach; 1. Mariaposching; 2. Niederwinkling; 3. Perasdorf; 4. Schwarzach^{1,2}	6. Stallwang; 1. Loitzendorf; 2. Rattiszell; 3. Stallwang^{1}; 7. Straßkirchen; 1. Irlbach; 2. Straßkirchen^{1}
^{1}seat of the Verwaltungsgemeinschaft; ^{2}Markt

== Former municipalities until 1 May 1978 ==
former municipality ( today a part of municipality )	population municipality (year 1961)	population main village (year 1961)
Bogenberg (Bogen)	585	191
Degernbach (Bogen)	1.035	98
Elisabethszell (Haibach)	774	227
Gossersdorf (Konzell)	620	270
Haunkenzell (Rattiszell)	688	130
Oberalteich (Bogen)	1.319	374
Saulburg (Wiesenfelden and Kirchroth)	737	190
Steinburg (Hunderdorf)	563	180
Waltendorf (Niederwinkling)	482	135
Zinzenzell (Wiesenfelden and Stallwang)	562	215
