= Oberschneiding =

- Municipality
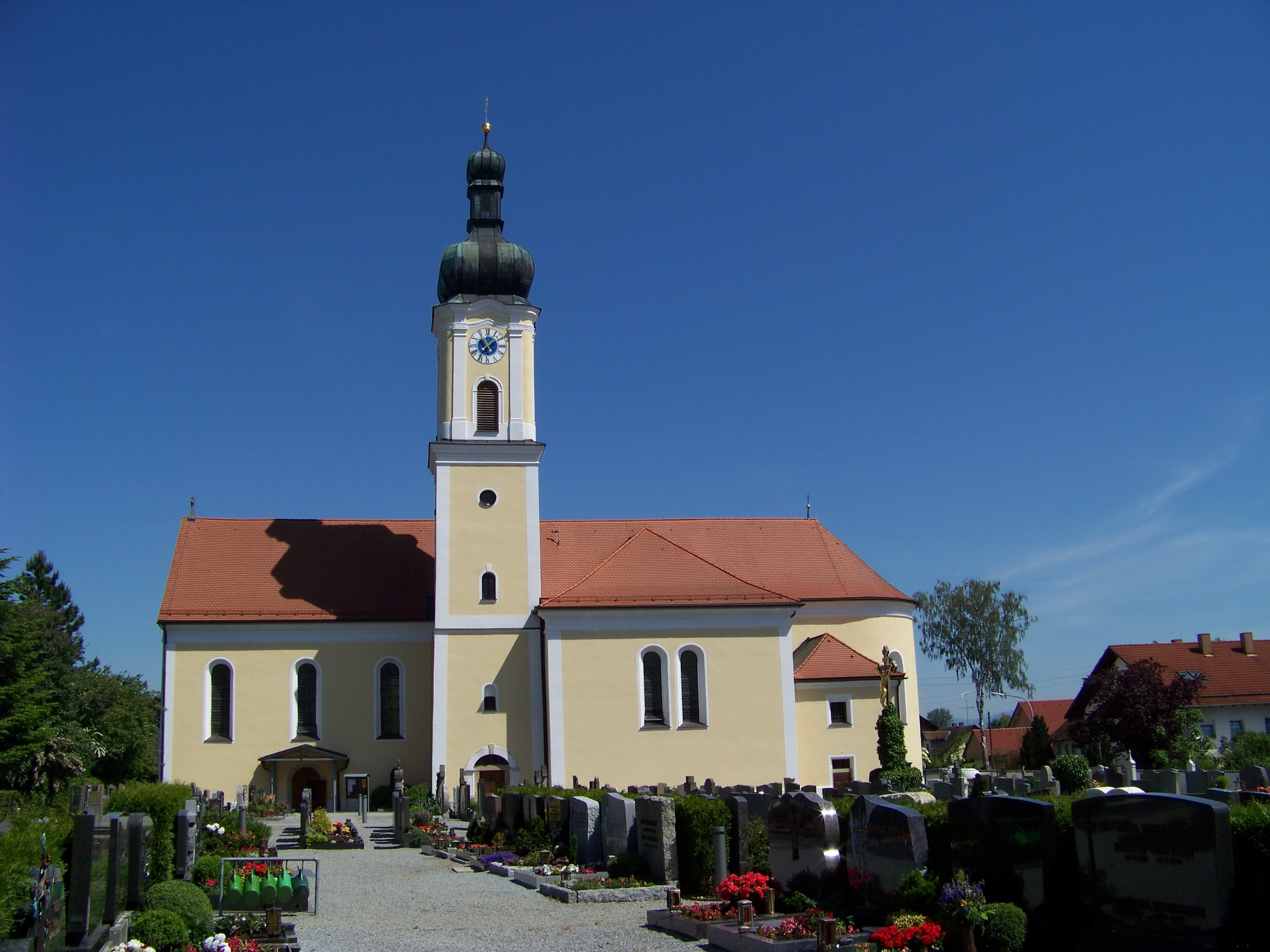
- Church of the Assumption of the Virgin Mary

- Coat of arms

- Location of Oberschneiding within Straubing-Bogen district
- Interactive map of Oberschneiding
- Location within Germany Location within Bavaria
- Coordinates: 48°48′N 12°39′E
- Country: Germany
- State: Bavaria
- Admin. region: Niederbayern
- District: Straubing-Bogen

Government
  - Mayor (2020–26): Ewald Seifert (CSU)

Area
  - Total: 60.77 km^{2} (23.46 sq mi)
- Elevation: 354 m (1,161 ft)

Population (2025-12-31)
  - Total: 3,325
  - Density: 54.71/km^{2} (141.7/sq mi)
- Time zone: UTC+01:00 (CET)
  - Summer (DST): UTC+02:00 (CEST)
- Postal codes: 94363
- Dialling codes: 09426
- Vehicle registration: SR
- Website: www.oberschneiding.de

Oberschneiding is a municipality in the district of Straubing-Bogen in Bavaria, Germany.

It is located in the south of the "Gäuboden", a very high-producing area famous for its agriculture.

Today's municipality of Oberschneiding consists of 31 villages formerly organized in five different municipalities (Grossenpinning, Niederschneiding, Oberschneiding, Reissing and Wolferkofen). The biggest town and seat of the municipality is Oberschneiding.

== History ==
The area around Oberschneiding was a place being settled in the Neolithic about 5000 BC. Many discoveries of skeletons, sherds, and daub prove the existence of settlements from the Stone Age. Some of the findings are shown in the Gäubodenmuseum in Straubing.

Oberschneiding was first mentioned in records in 790 AD. The "Brevivarius Urolfi", a document written in the monastery of Niederaltaich, names a village called "Snudinga". This name - like all Bavarian towns that end on ing - goes back to the leader of the clan that founded the settlement, Snudo. The name changed from Snudinga to "Schneiding" in the following centuries. Today it is not quite clear which town was mentioned in the document because there are two settlements called "Schneiding": Oberschneiding (=upper Schneiding) and Niederschneiding (=lower Schneiding).
