= Salching =

- Municipality
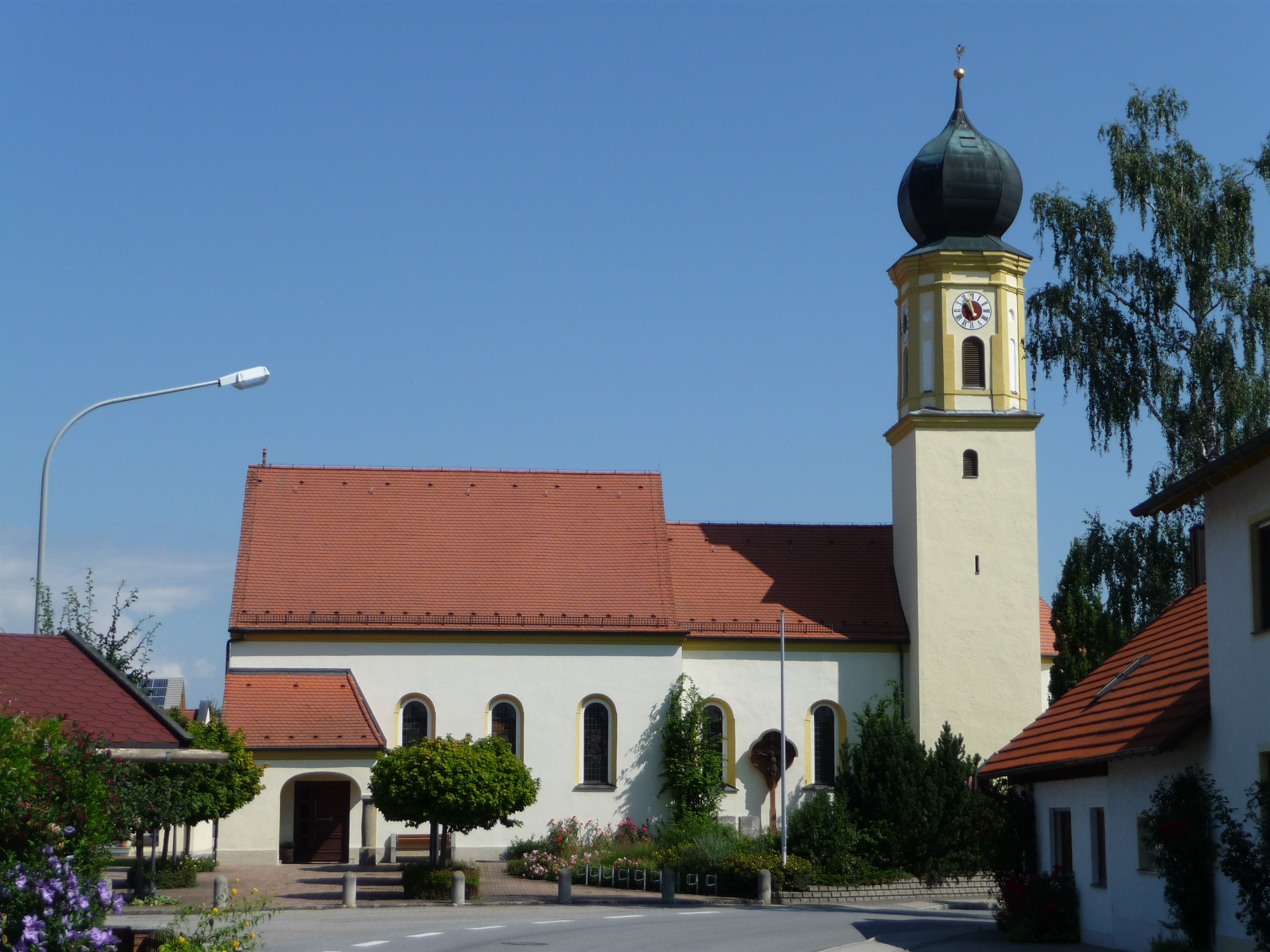
- Church of Saints Peter and Paul

- Coat of arms

- Location of Salching within Straubing-Bogen district
- Interactive map of Salching
- Location within Germany Location within Bavaria
- Coordinates: 48°49′N 12°34′E
- Country: Germany
- State: Bavaria
- Admin. region: Niederbayern
- District: Straubing-Bogen
- Municipal assoc.: Aiterhofen

Government
  - Mayor (2020–26): Alfons Neumeier (CSU)

Area
  - Total: 22 km^{2} (8.5 sq mi)
- Elevation: 347 m (1,138 ft)

Population (2025-12-31)
  - Total: 2,782
  - Density: 130/km^{2} (330/sq mi)
- Time zone: UTC+01:00 (CET)
  - Summer (DST): UTC+02:00 (CEST)
- Postal codes: 94330
- Dialling codes: 09426
- Vehicle registration: SR
- Website: www.salching.de

Salching (German pronunciation: [ˈzalçɪŋ]) is a municipality in the district of Straubing-Bogen in Bavaria, Germany.
