= Aiterhofen (Verwaltungsgemeinschaft) =

- Verwaltungsgemeinschaft
- Location of Aiterhofen within Straubing-Bogen district
- Interactive map of Aiterhofen
- Location within Germany Location within Bavaria
- Coordinates: 48°51′N 12°37′E
- Country: Germany
- State: Bavaria
- Admin. region: Lower Bavaria
- District: Straubing-Bogen
- Seat: Aiterhofen
- Subdivisions: 2 municipalities

Area
  - Total: 65.09 km^{2} (25.13 sq mi)

Population (2025-12-31)
  - Total: 6,332
  - Density: 97.28/km^{2} (252.0/sq mi)
- Time zone: UTC+01:00 (CET)
  - Summer (DST): UTC+02:00 (CEST)
- Website: www.vg-aiterhofen.de

Aiterhofen is a Verwaltungsgemeinschaft (municipal association) in the district Straubing-Bogen in Bavaria, Germany. Its seat is in Aiterhofen.

It consists of the following municipalities:

1. Aiterhofen
2. Salching
