= Aholfing =

- Municipality
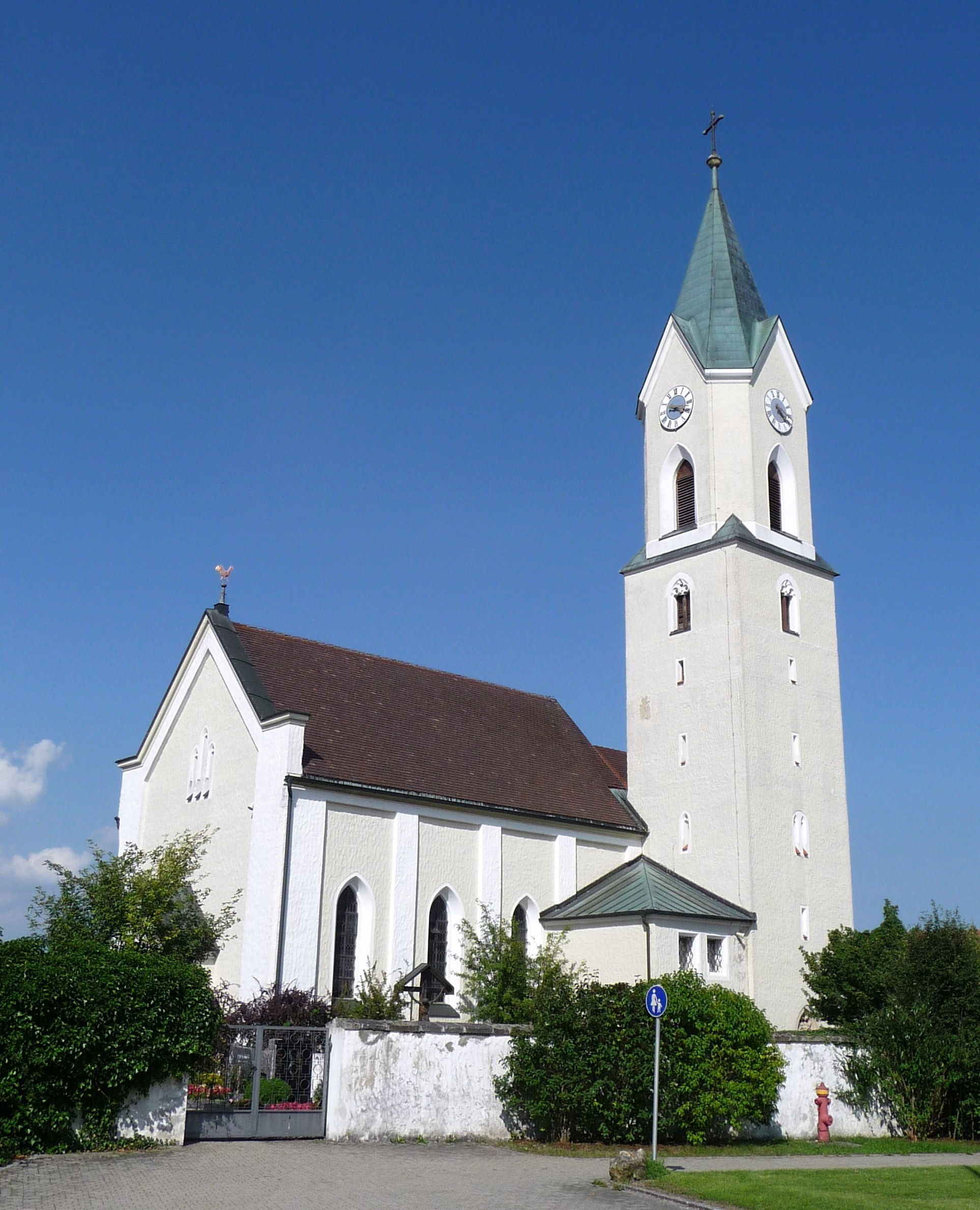
- Church of Saint Luke

- Coat of arms

- Location of Aholfing within Straubing-Bogen district
- Interactive map of Aholfing
- Location within Germany Location within Bavaria
- Coordinates: 48°57′N 12°28′E
- Country: Germany
- State: Bavaria
- Admin. region: Niederbayern
- District: Straubing-Bogen
- Municipal assoc.: Rain

Government
  - Mayor (2020–26): Johann Busl (CSU)

Area
  - Total: 21.32 km^{2} (8.23 sq mi)
- Elevation: 324 m (1,063 ft)

Population (2025-12-31)
  - Total: 1,905
  - Density: 89.35/km^{2} (231.4/sq mi)
- Time zone: UTC+01:00 (CET)
  - Summer (DST): UTC+02:00 (CEST)
- Postal codes: 94345
- Dialling codes: 09429
- Vehicle registration: SR
- Website: www.aholfing.de

Aholfing is a municipality in the district of Straubing-Bogen in Bavaria, Germany.
