= Straßkirchen (Verwaltungsgemeinschaft) =

- Verwaltungsgemeinschaft
- Location of Straßkirchen within Straubing-Bogen district
- Interactive map of Straßkirchen
- Location within Germany Location within Bavaria
- Coordinates: 48°50′N 12°43′E
- Country: Germany
- State: Bavaria
- Admin. region: Lower Bavaria
- District: Straubing-Bogen
- Seat: Straßkirchen
- Subdivisions: 2 municipalities

Area
  - Total: 54.23 km^{2} (20.94 sq mi)

Population (2025-12-31)
  - Total: 4,602
  - Density: 84.86/km^{2} (219.8/sq mi)
- Time zone: UTC+01:00 (CET)
  - Summer (DST): UTC+02:00 (CEST)
- Website: www.vg-strasskirchen.de

Straßkirchen is a Verwaltungsgemeinschaft (municipal association) in the district Straubing-Bogen in Bavaria, Germany. Its seat is in Straßkirchen.

It consists of the following municipalities:

1. Irlbach
2. Straßkirchen
