= Hunderdorf (Verwaltungsgemeinschaft) =

- Verwaltungsgemeinschaft
- Location of Hunderdorf within Straubing-Bogen district
- Interactive map of Hunderdorf
- Location within Germany Location within Bavaria
- Coordinates: 48°56′N 12°44′E
- Country: Germany
- State: Bavaria
- Admin. region: Lower Bavaria
- District: Straubing-Bogen
- Seat: Hunderdorf
- Subdivisions: 3 municipalities

Area
  - Total: 54.63 km^{2} (21.09 sq mi)

Population (2025-12-31)
  - Total: 6,132
  - Density: 112.2/km^{2} (290.7/sq mi)
- Time zone: UTC+01:00 (CET)
  - Summer (DST): UTC+02:00 (CEST)
- Website: www.hunderdorf.de

Hunderdorf is a Verwaltungsgemeinschaft (municipal association) in the district Straubing-Bogen in Bavaria, Germany. Its seat is in Hunderdorf.

It consists of the following municipalities:

1. Hunderdorf
2. Neukirchen
3. Windberg
