= Hunderdorf =

- Municipality
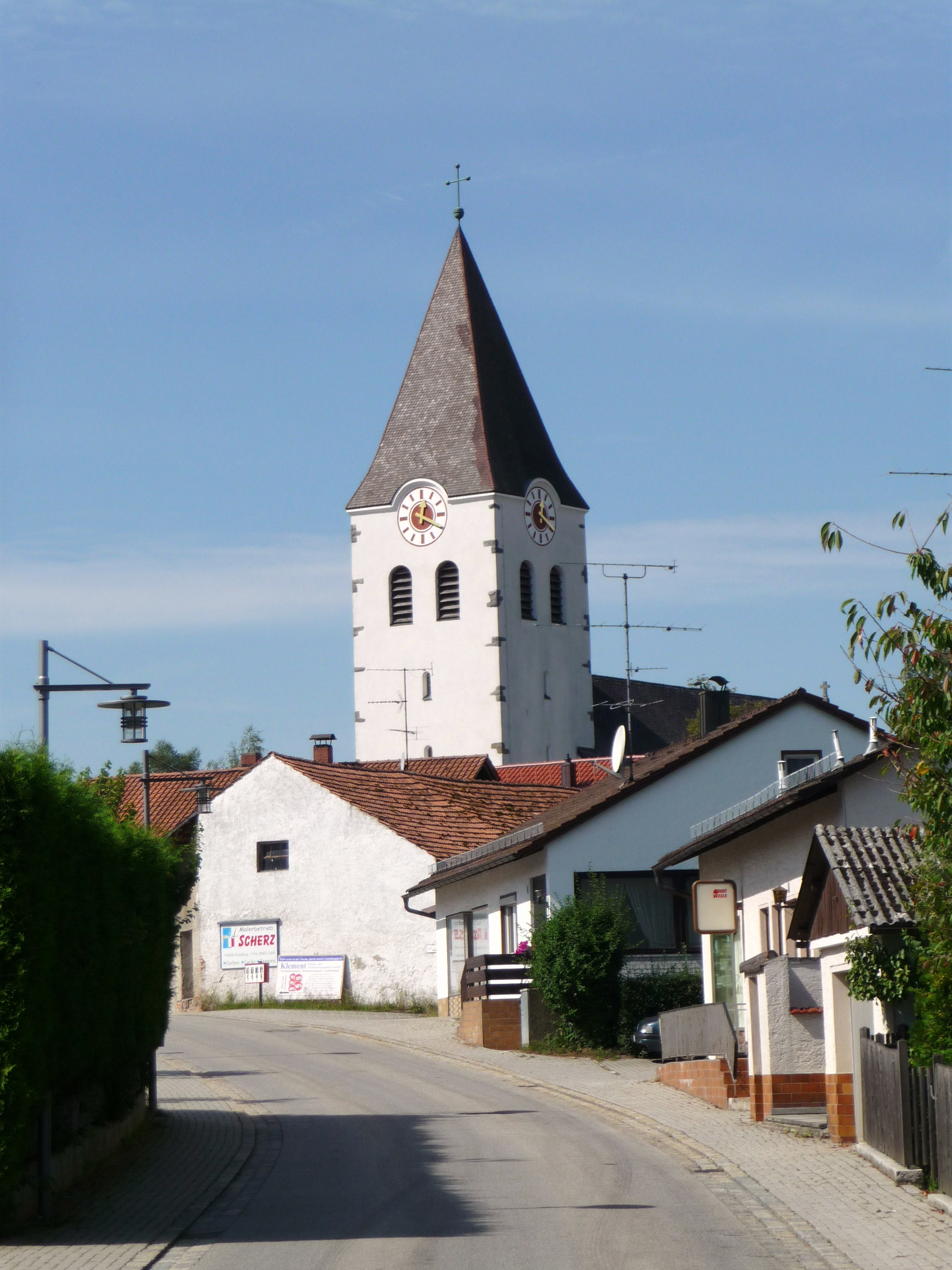
- Church of Saint Nicholas

- Coat of arms

- Location of Hunderdorf within Straubing-Bogen district
- Interactive map of Hunderdorf
- Location within Germany Location within Bavaria
- Coordinates: 48°57′N 12°44′E
- Country: Germany
- State: Bavaria
- Admin. region: Niederbayern
- District: Straubing-Bogen
- Municipal assoc.: Hunderdorf

Government
  - Mayor (2020–26): Max Höcherl (CSU)

Area
  - Total: 22.2 km^{2} (8.6 sq mi)
- Elevation: 338 m (1,109 ft)

Population (2025-12-31)
  - Total: 3,266
  - Density: 147/km^{2} (381/sq mi)
- Time zone: UTC+01:00 (CET)
  - Summer (DST): UTC+02:00 (CEST)
- Postal codes: 94336
- Dialling codes: 09422
- Vehicle registration: SR
- Website: www.hunderdorf.de

Hunderdorf (German pronunciation: [ˈhʊndɐdɔʁf]) is a municipality in the district of Straubing-Bogen in Bavaria, Germany.
