= Rattiszell =

- Municipality
- Coat of arms

- Location of Rattiszell within Straubing-Bogen district
- Interactive map of Rattiszell
- Location within Germany Location within Bavaria
- Coordinates: 49°2′N 12°40′E
- Country: Germany
- State: Bavaria
- Admin. region: Niederbayern
- District: Straubing-Bogen
- Municipal assoc.: Stallwang

Government
  - Mayor (2020–26): Manfred Reiner (FW)

Area
  - Total: 22.16 km^{2} (8.56 sq mi)
- Elevation: 363 m (1,191 ft)

Population (2025-12-31)
  - Total: 1,487
  - Density: 67.10/km^{2} (173.8/sq mi)
- Time zone: UTC+01:00 (CET)
  - Summer (DST): UTC+02:00 (CEST)
- Postal codes: 94372
- Dialling codes: 09964
- Vehicle registration: SR
- Website: www.vg-stallwang.de/rattiszell

Rattiszell is a municipality in the district of Straubing-Bogen in Bavaria, Germany.
