= Loitzendorf =

- Municipality
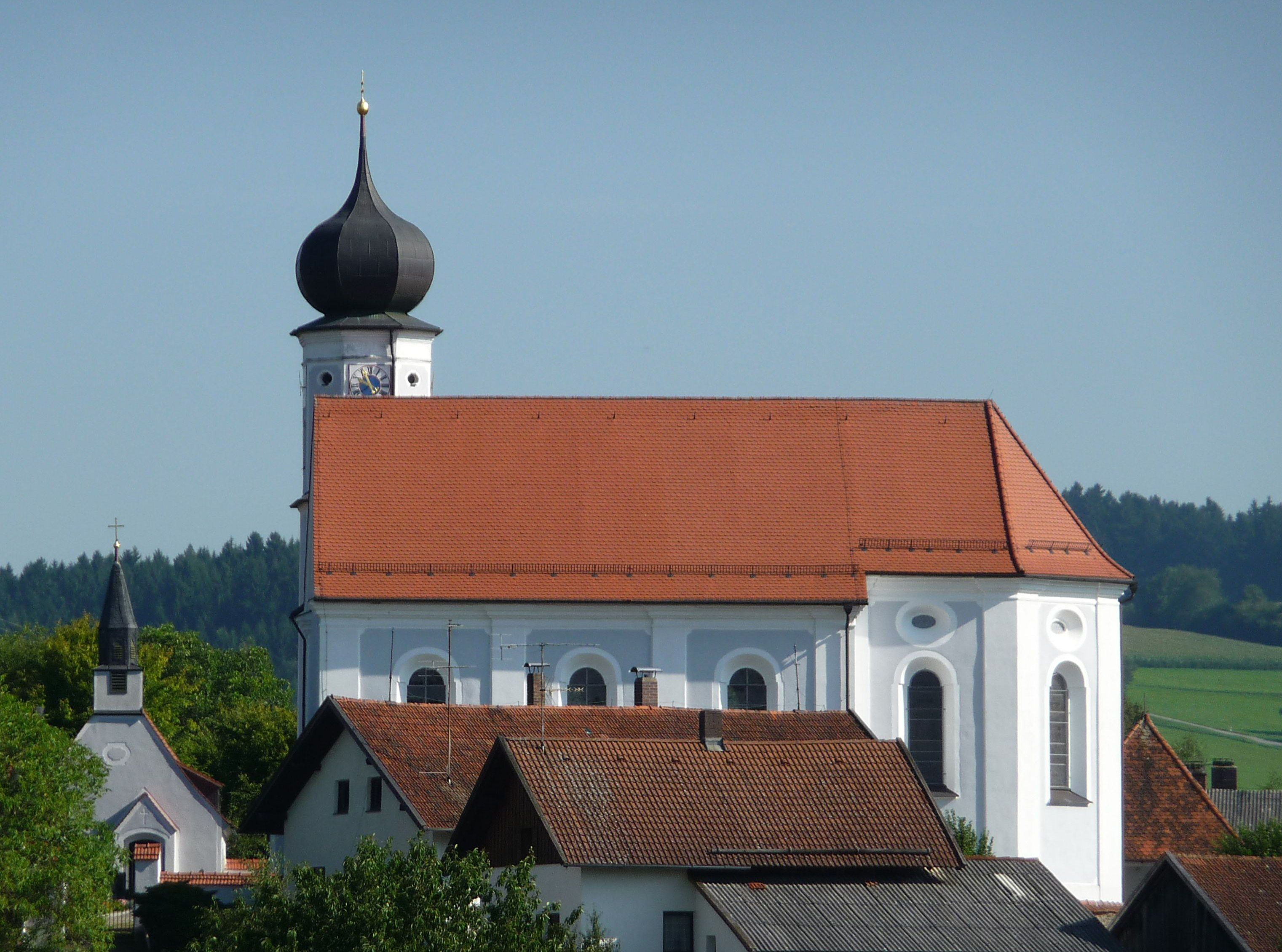
- Church of Saint Margaret

- Coat of arms

- Location of Loitzendorf within Straubing-Bogen district
- Interactive map of Loitzendorf
- Location within Germany Location within Bavaria
- Coordinates: 49°5′N 12°39′E
- Country: Germany
- State: Bavaria
- Admin. region: Niederbayern
- District: Straubing-Bogen
- Municipal assoc.: Stallwang
- Subdivisions: 6 Ortsteile

Government
  - Mayor (2020–26): Johann Anderl (CSU)

Area
  - Total: 12.03 km^{2} (4.64 sq mi)
- Elevation: 411 m (1,348 ft)

Population (2025-12-31)
  - Total: 641
  - Density: 53.3/km^{2} (138/sq mi)
- Time zone: UTC+01:00 (CET)
  - Summer (DST): UTC+02:00 (CEST)
- Postal codes: 94359
- Dialling codes: 09964
- Vehicle registration: SR
- Website: http://www.loitzendorf.de/

Loitzendorf (German pronunciation: [ˈlɔʏtsn̩dɔʁf]) is a municipality in the district of Straubing-Bogen in Bavaria, Germany.
