= Niederwinkling =

- Municipality
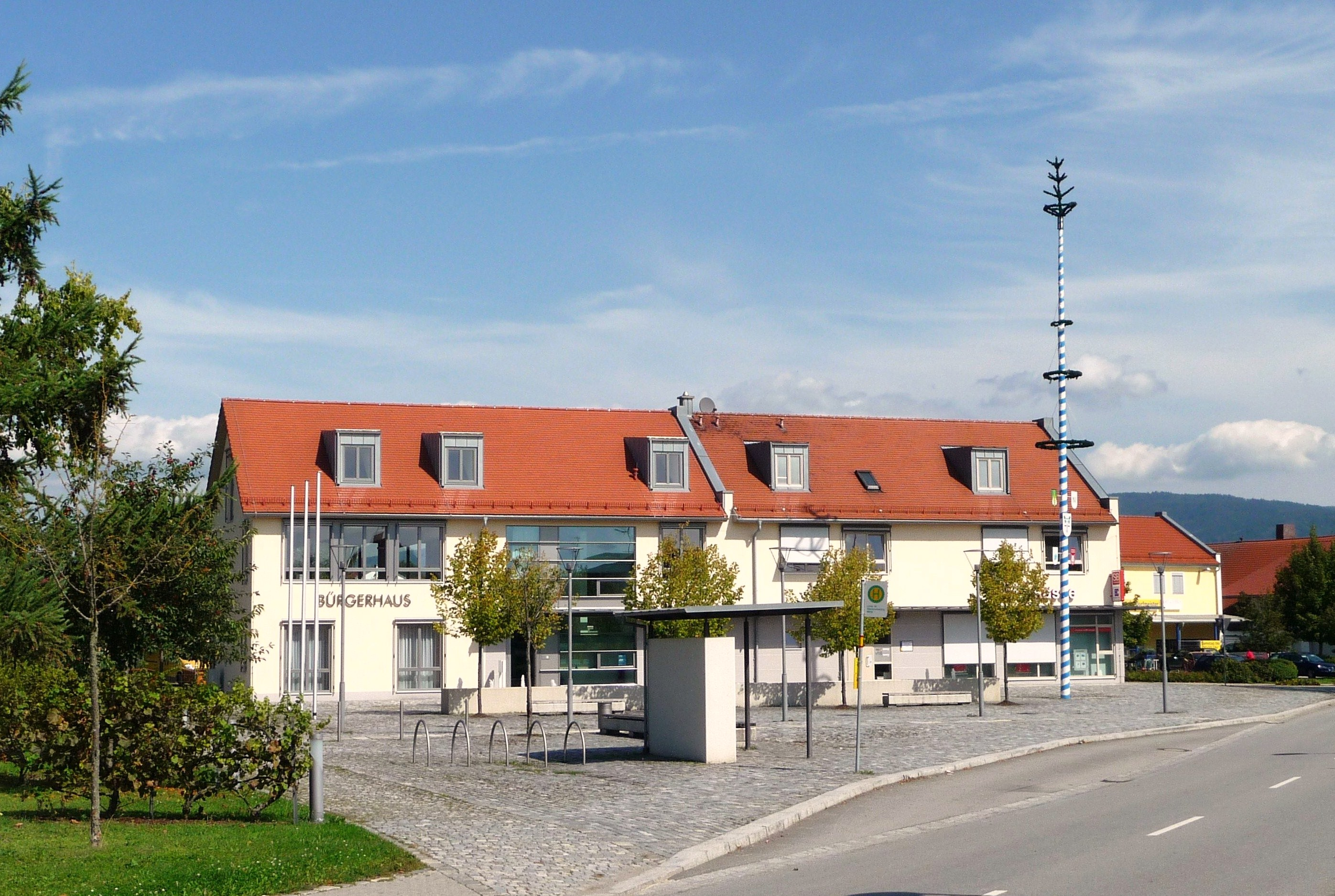
- Bürgerhaus at the market square

- Coat of arms

- Location of Niederwinkling within Straubing-Bogen district
- Interactive map of Niederwinkling
- Location within Germany Location within Bavaria
- Coordinates: 48°53′N 12°48′E
- Country: Germany
- State: Bavaria
- Admin. region: Niederbayern
- District: Straubing-Bogen
- Municipal assoc.: Schwarzach

Government
  - Mayor (2020–26): Ludwig Waas (FW)

Area
  - Total: 25.63 km^{2} (9.90 sq mi)
- Elevation: 320 m (1,050 ft)

Population (2025-12-31)
  - Total: 2,935
  - Density: 114.5/km^{2} (296.6/sq mi)
- Time zone: UTC+01:00 (CET)
  - Summer (DST): UTC+02:00 (CEST)
- Postal codes: 94559
- Dialling codes: 09962
- Vehicle registration: SR
- Website: www.niederwinkling.de

Niederwinkling is a municipality in the district of Straubing-Bogen in Bavaria, Germany. It is a member of the municipal association Schwarzach.
