= Rain, Lower Bavaria =

Rain
- Municipality
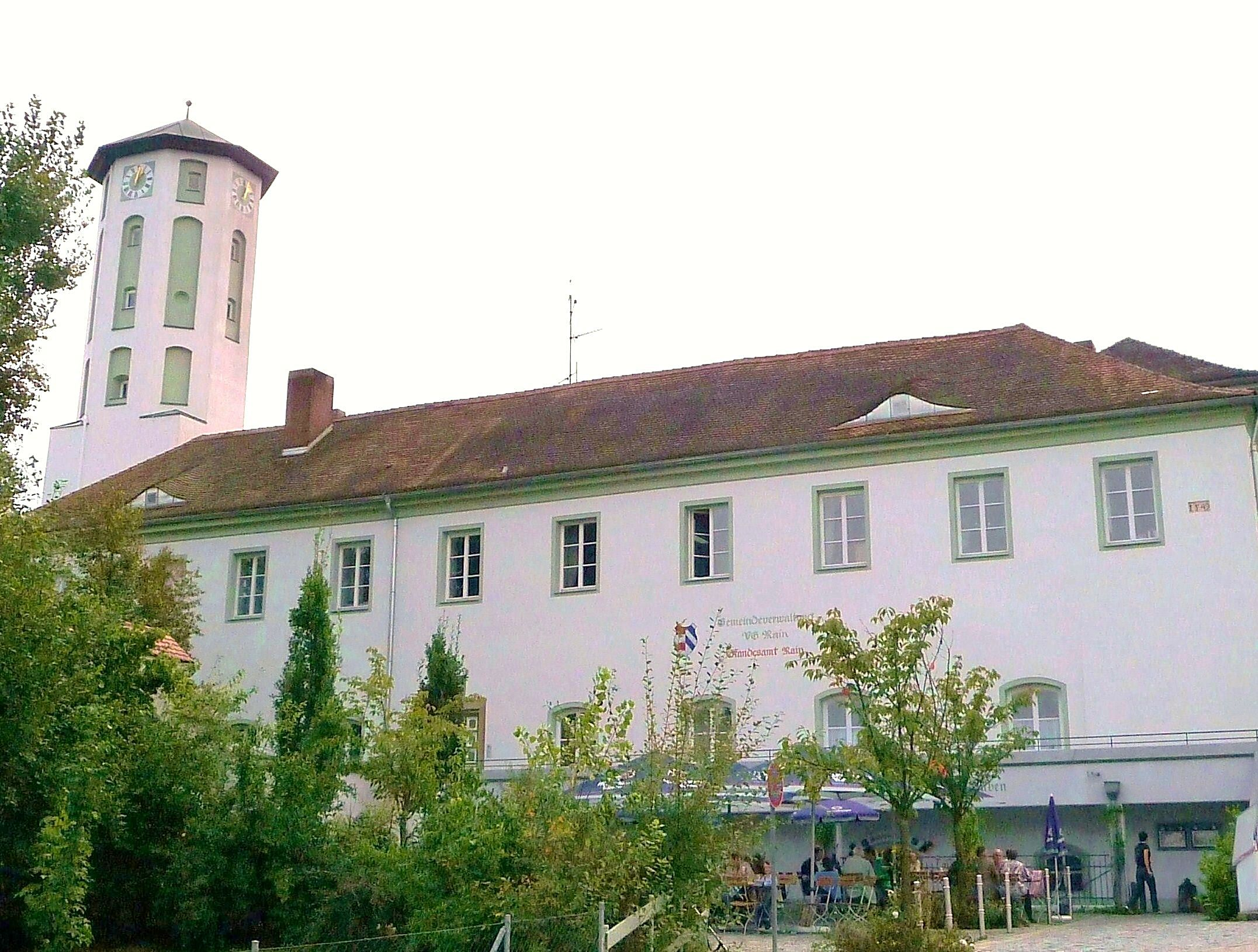
- Rain Castle

- Coat of arms

- Location of Rain within Straubing-Bogen district
- Interactive map of Rain
- Location within Germany Location within Bavaria
- Coordinates: 48°54′N 12°28′E
- Country: Germany
- State: Bavaria
- Admin. region: Niederbayern
- District: Straubing-Bogen
- Municipal assoc.: Rain

Government
  - Mayor (2020–26): Anita Bogner (ÖDP)

Area
  - Total: 14.29 km^{2} (5.52 sq mi)
- Elevation: 330 m (1,080 ft)

Population (2025-12-31)
  - Total: 2,968
  - Density: 207.7/km^{2} (537.9/sq mi)
- Time zone: UTC+01:00 (CET)
  - Summer (DST): UTC+02:00 (CEST)
- Postal codes: 94369
- Dialling codes: 09429
- Vehicle registration: SR
- Website: www.gemeinde-rain.de

Rain (German pronunciation: [ʁaɪn]) is a municipality in the district of Straubing-Bogen in Bavaria, Germany. A former head of state of Hungary, Archduke Joseph August of Austria, died here in 1962.
