= Perkam =

- Municipality
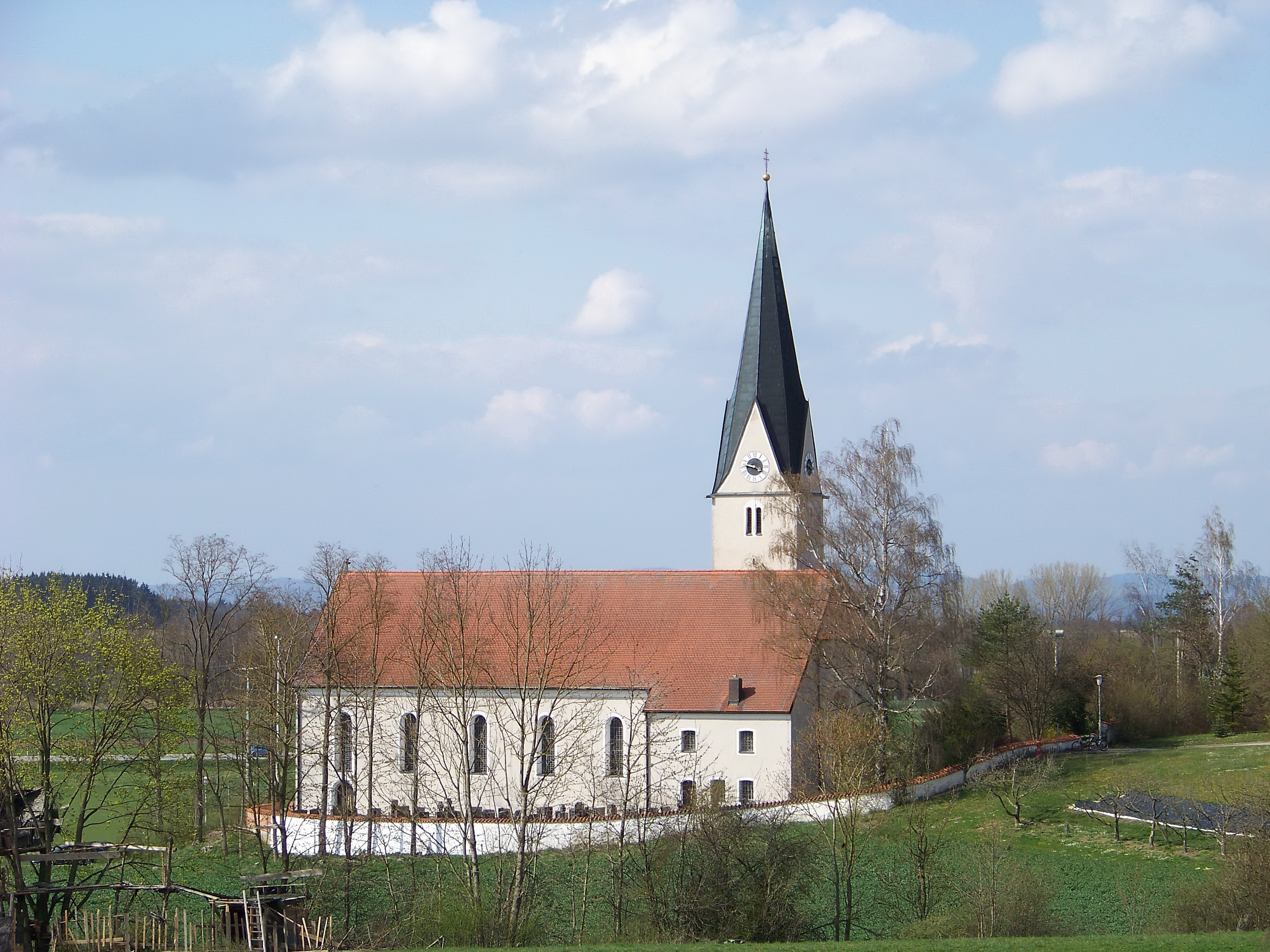
- Church of the Assumption of the Virgin Mary

- Coat of arms

- Location of Perkam within Straubing-Bogen district
- Interactive map of Perkam
- Location within Germany Location within Bavaria
- Coordinates: 48°51′N 12°26′E
- Country: Germany
- State: Bavaria
- Admin. region: Niederbayern
- District: Straubing-Bogen
- Municipal assoc.: Rain

Government
  - Mayor (2020–26): Hubert Ammer

Area
  - Total: 14.22 km^{2} (5.49 sq mi)
- Elevation: 360 m (1,180 ft)

Population (2025-12-31)
  - Total: 1,611
  - Density: 113.3/km^{2} (293.4/sq mi)
- Time zone: UTC+01:00 (CET)
  - Summer (DST): UTC+02:00 (CEST)
- Postal codes: 94368
- Dialling codes: 09429
- Vehicle registration: SR
- Website: www.perkam.de

Perkam is a municipality in the district of Straubing-Bogen in Bavaria, Germany.
