= Stallwang (Verwaltungsgemeinschaft) =

- Verwaltungsgemeinschaft
- Location of Stallwang within Straubing-Bogen district
- Interactive map of Stallwang
- Location within Germany Location within Bavaria
- Coordinates: 49°03′N 12°39′E
- Country: Germany
- State: Bavaria
- Admin. region: Lower Bavaria
- District: Straubing-Bogen
- Seat: Stallwang
- Subdivisions: 3 municipalities

Area
  - Total: 54.79 km^{2} (21.15 sq mi)

Population (2025-12-31)
  - Total: 3,540
  - Density: 64.6/km^{2} (167/sq mi)
- Time zone: UTC+01:00 (CET)
  - Summer (DST): UTC+02:00 (CEST)
- Website: vg-stallwang.de

Stallwang is a Verwaltungsgemeinschaft (municipal association) in the district Straubing-Bogen in Bavaria, Germany. Its seat is in Stallwang.

It consists of the following municipalities:

1. Loitzendorf
2. Rattiszell
3. Stallwang
