= Schwarzach, Lower Bavaria =

Schwarzach
- Municipality
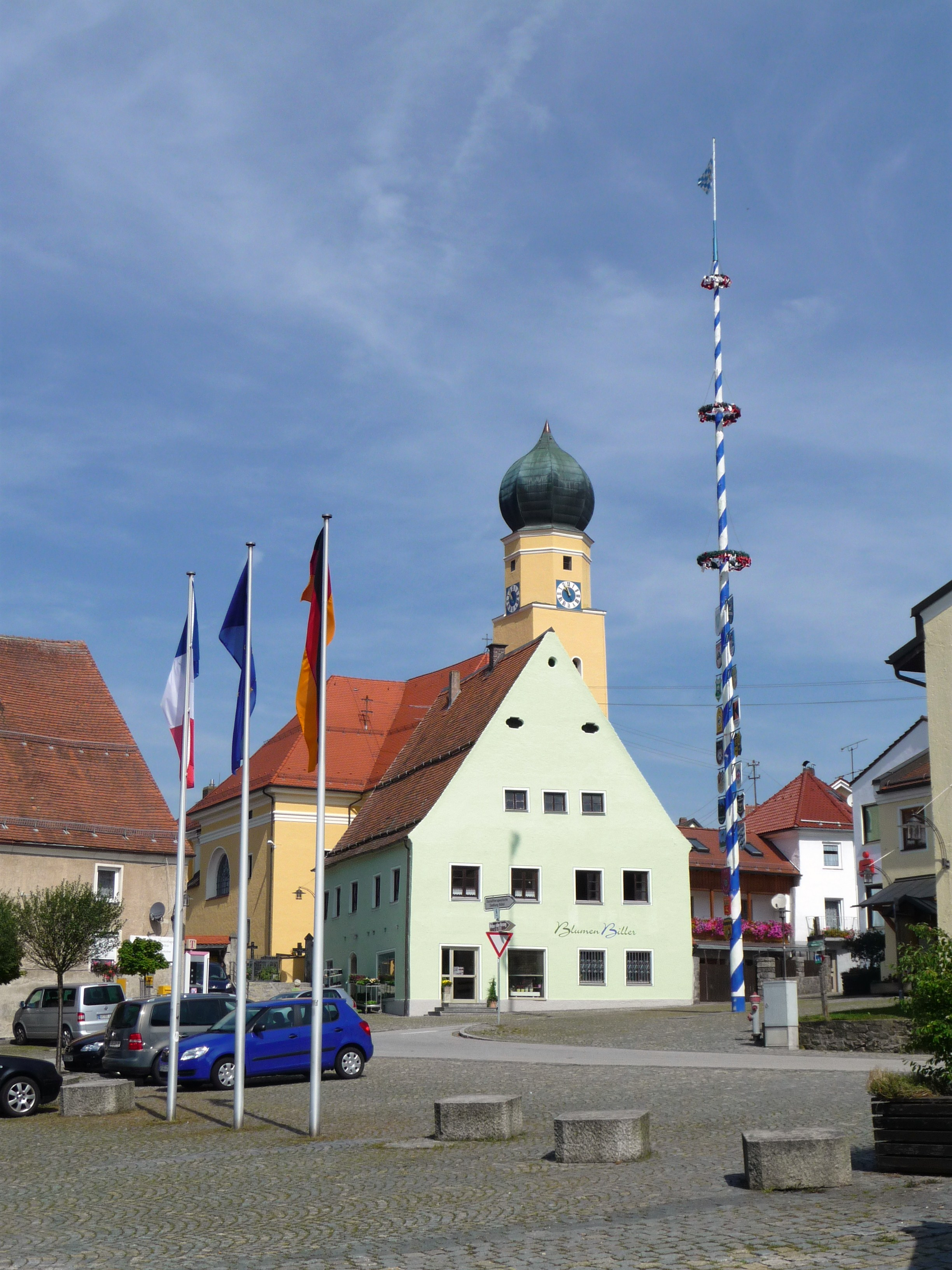
- Market square with the Church of Saint Martin

- Coat of arms

- Location of Schwarzach within Straubing-Bogen district
- Interactive map of Schwarzach
- Location within Germany Location within Bavaria
- Coordinates: 48°55′N 12°49′E
- Country: Germany
- State: Bavaria
- Admin. region: Niederbayern
- District: Straubing-Bogen
- Municipal assoc.: Schwarzach

Government
  - Mayor (2020–26): Georg Edbauer jun. (CSU)

Area
  - Total: 33.22 km^{2} (12.83 sq mi)
- Elevation: 360–1,095 m (1,181–3,593 ft)

Population (2025-12-31)
  - Total: 2,954
  - Density: 88.92/km^{2} (230.3/sq mi)
- Time zone: UTC+01:00 (CET)
  - Summer (DST): UTC+02:00 (CEST)
- Postal codes: 94374
- Dialling codes: 09962
- Vehicle registration: SR
- Website: www.schwarzach.de

Schwarzach (German pronunciation: [ˈʃvaʁtsax]) is a market town and municipality in the district of Straubing-Bogen in Bavaria, Germany. It is the seat of the municipal association Schwarzach. The town is an officially recognised Resort town.
