= Steinach, Bavaria =

Steinach
- Municipality
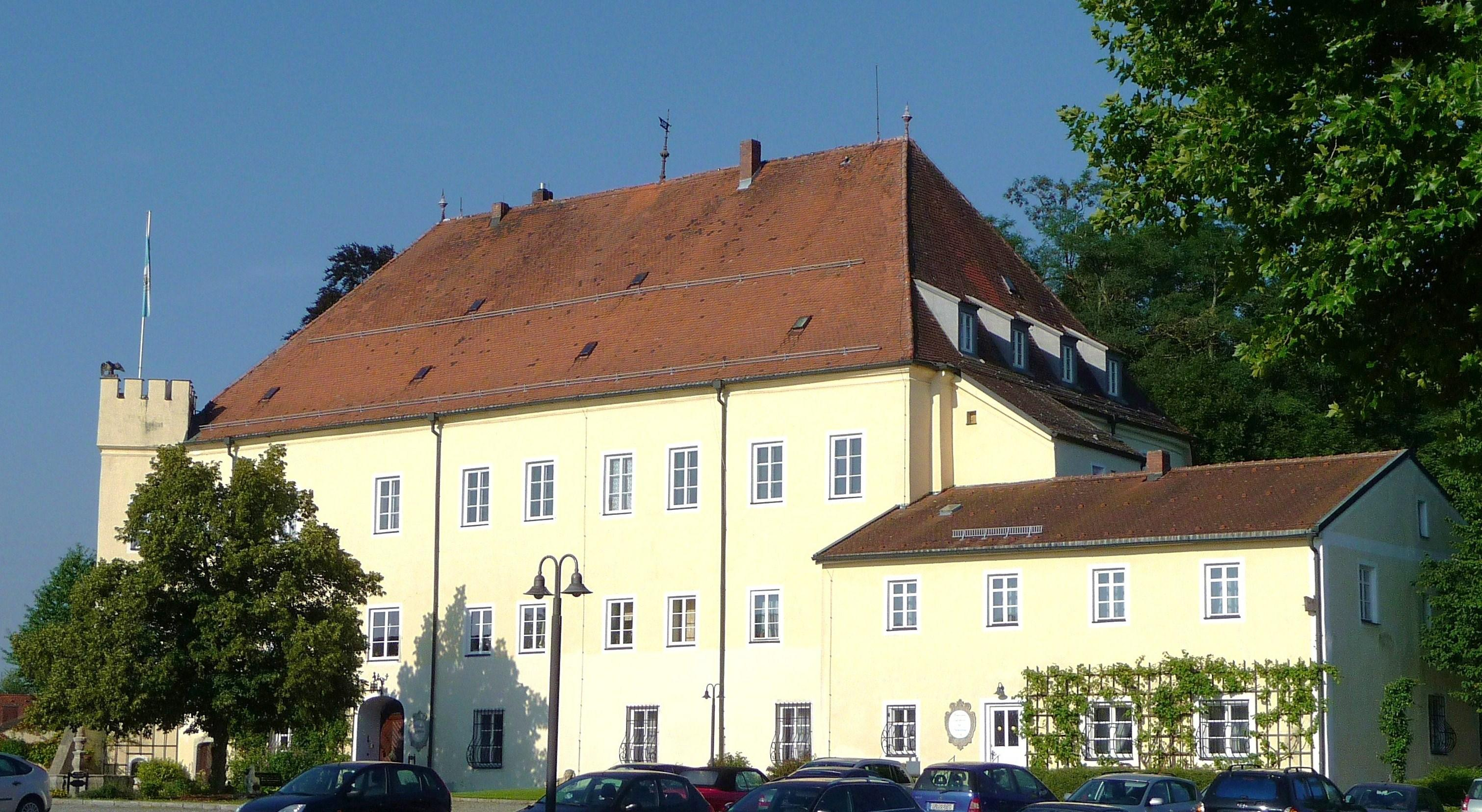
- Old Castle in Steinach

- Coat of arms

- Location of Steinach within Straubing-Bogen district
- Interactive map of Steinach
- Location within Germany Location within Bavaria
- Coordinates: 48°57′N 12°37′E
- Country: Germany
- State: Bavaria
- Admin. region: Niederbayern
- District: Straubing-Bogen
- Subdivisions: 5 Ortsteile

Government
  - Mayor (2020–26): Christine Hammerschick

Area
  - Total: 23.15 km^{2} (8.94 sq mi)
- Elevation: 348 m (1,142 ft)

Population (2025-12-31)
  - Total: 3,337
  - Density: 144.1/km^{2} (373.3/sq mi)
- Time zone: UTC+01:00 (CET)
  - Summer (DST): UTC+02:00 (CEST)
- Postal codes: 94377
- Dialling codes: 09428
- Vehicle registration: SR
- Website: www.steinach.eu

Steinach (German pronunciation: [ˈʃtaɪnax]) is a municipality in the district of Straubing-Bogen in Bavaria, Germany.
