= Perasdorf =

- Municipality
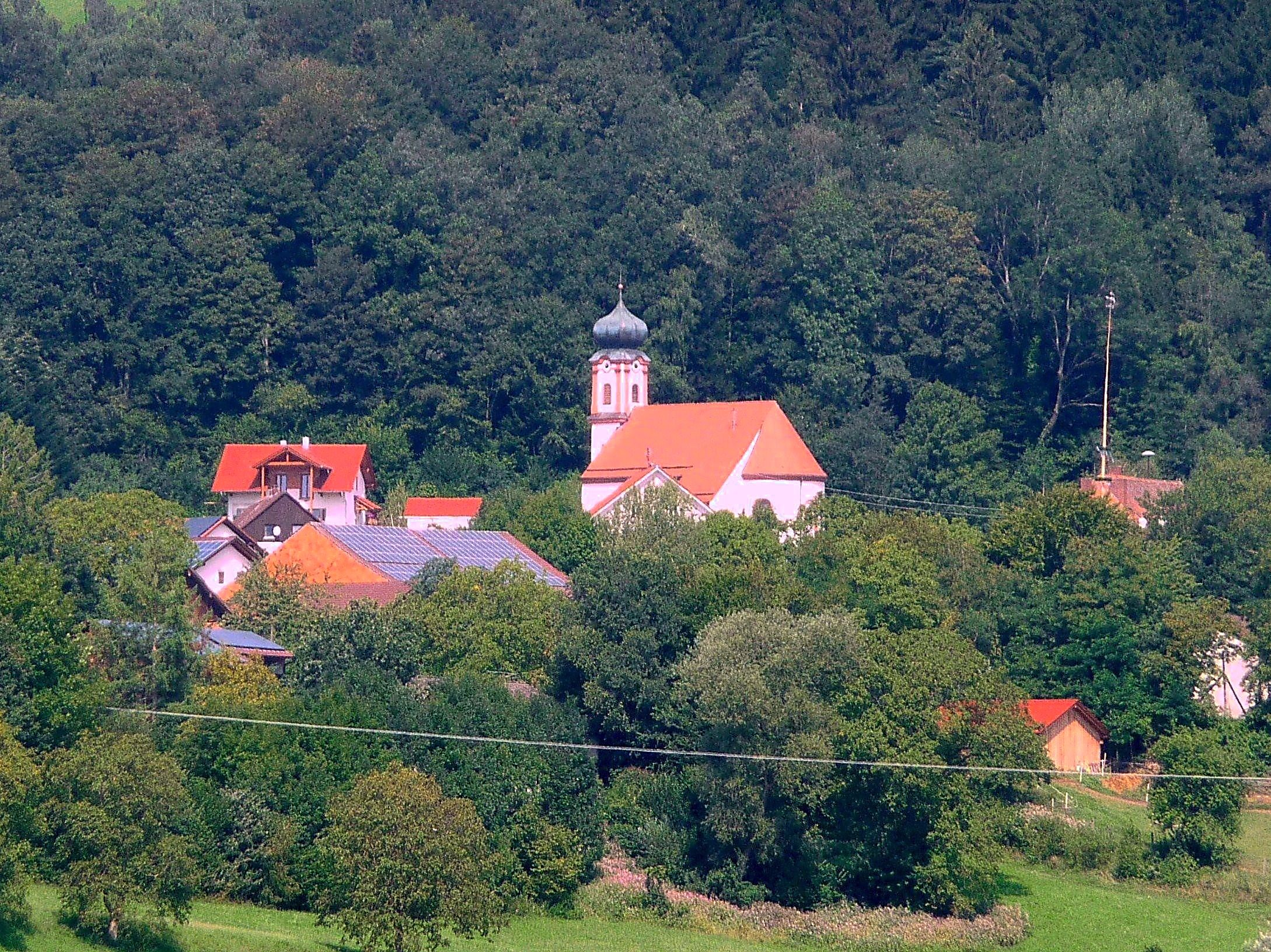
- View of the village with the Church of Saint Lawrence

- Coat of arms

- Location of Perasdorf within Straubing-Bogen district
- Interactive map of Perasdorf
- Location within Germany Location within Bavaria
- Coordinates: 48°57′N 12°48′E
- Country: Germany
- State: Bavaria
- Admin. region: Niederbayern
- District: Straubing-Bogen
- Municipal assoc.: Schwarzach

Government
  - Mayor (2020–26): Thomas Schuster

Area
  - Total: 16.05 km^{2} (6.20 sq mi)
- Elevation: 365–925 m (1,198–3,035 ft)

Population (2025-12-31)
  - Total: 522
  - Density: 32.5/km^{2} (84.2/sq mi)
- Time zone: UTC+01:00 (CET)
  - Summer (DST): UTC+02:00 (CEST)
- Postal codes: 94366
- Dialling codes: 09962
- Vehicle registration: SR
- Website: www.perasdorf.de

Perasdorf is a municipality in the district of Straubing-Bogen in Bavaria, Germany. It is a member of the municipal association Schwarzach.
