= Mariaposching =

- Municipality
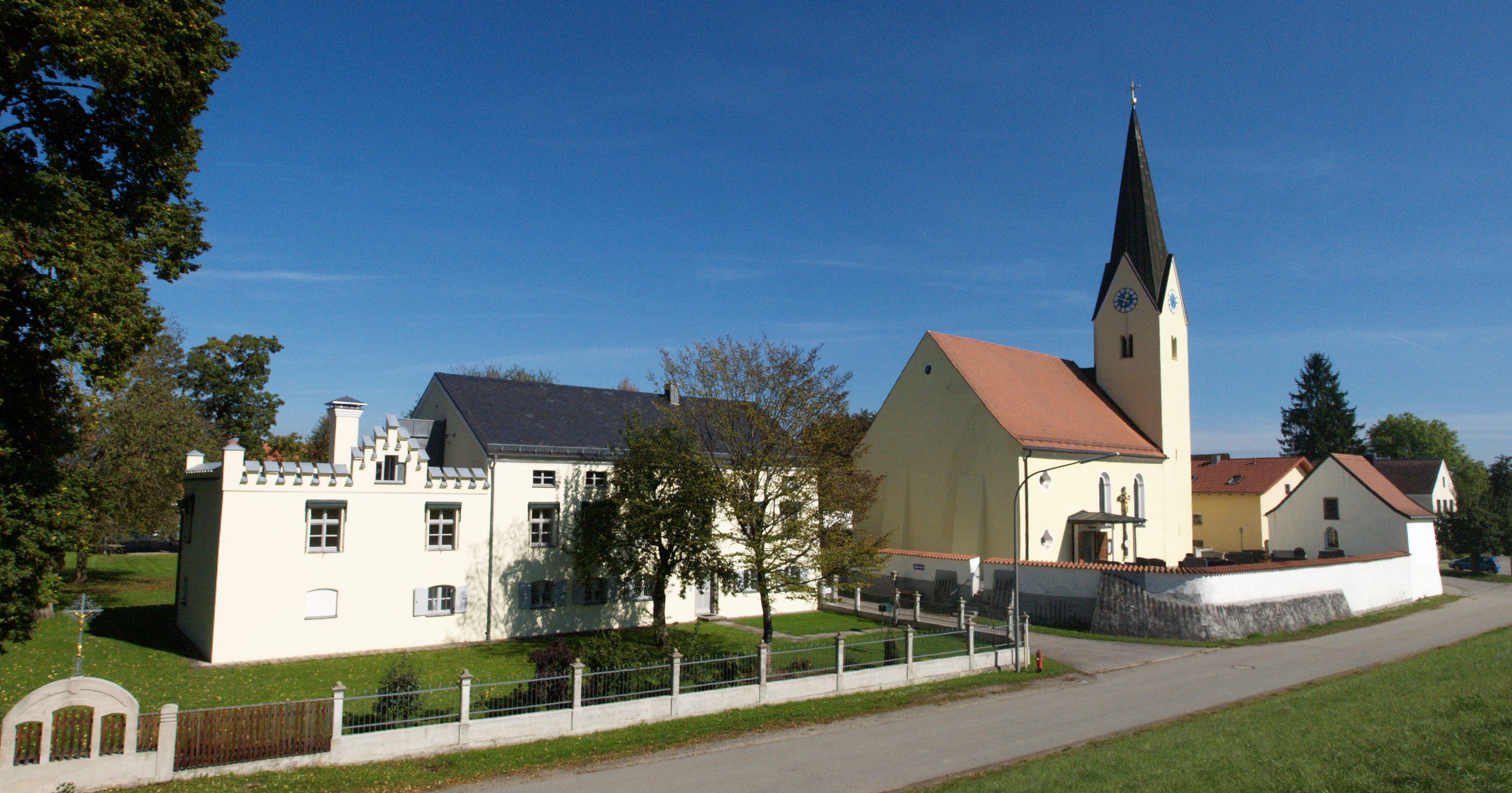
- Church of the Nativity of the Virgin Mary with the rectory

- Coat of arms

- Location of Mariaposching within Straubing-Bogen district
- Interactive map of Mariaposching
- Location within Germany Location within Bavaria
- Coordinates: 48°50′N 12°48′E
- Country: Germany
- State: Bavaria
- Admin. region: Niederbayern
- District: Straubing-Bogen
- Municipal assoc.: Schwarzach

Government
  - Mayor (2020–26): Martin Englmeier (CSU)

Area
  - Total: 19.61 km^{2} (7.57 sq mi)
- Elevation: 316 m (1,037 ft)

Population (2025-12-31)
  - Total: 1,379
  - Density: 70.32/km^{2} (182.1/sq mi)
- Time zone: UTC+01:00 (CET)
  - Summer (DST): UTC+02:00 (CEST)
- Postal codes: 94553
- Dialling codes: 09906
- Vehicle registration: SR
- Website: www.mariaposching.de

Mariaposching (Bavarian: Mariapousching) is a municipality in the district of Straubing-Bogen in Bavaria, Germany. It is a member of the municipal association Schwarzach.

It is located on the river Danube.
