= Atting =

- Municipality
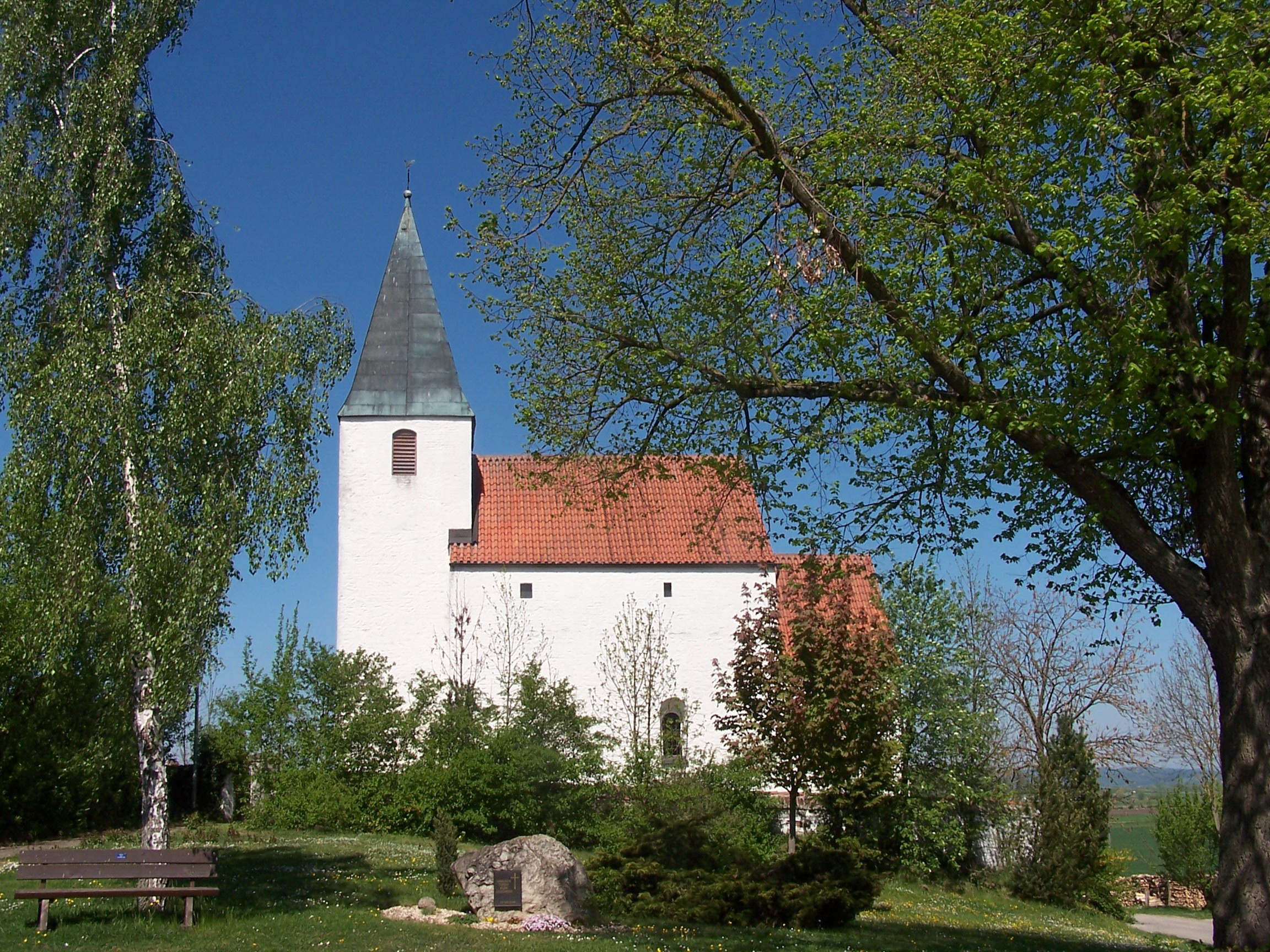
- Church of Saint John the Baptist in Rinkam

- Coat of arms

- Location of Atting within Straubing-Bogen district
- Interactive map of Atting
- Location within Germany Location within Bavaria
- Coordinates: 48°54′N 12°29′E
- Country: Germany
- State: Bavaria
- Admin. region: Niederbayern
- District: Straubing-Bogen
- Municipal assoc.: Rain

Government
  - Mayor (2020–26): Robert Ruber

Area
  - Total: 14.92 km^{2} (5.76 sq mi)
- Elevation: 332 m (1,089 ft)

Population (2025-12-31)
  - Total: 1,665
  - Density: 111.6/km^{2} (289.0/sq mi)
- Time zone: UTC+01:00 (CET)
  - Summer (DST): UTC+02:00 (CEST)
- Postal codes: 94348
- Dialling codes: 09429
- Vehicle registration: SR
- Website: www.atting.de

Atting (German pronunciation: [ˈatɪŋ]) is a municipality in the district of Straubing-Bogen in Bavaria, Germany.
