= Neukirchen, Lower Bavaria =

Neukirchen
- Municipality
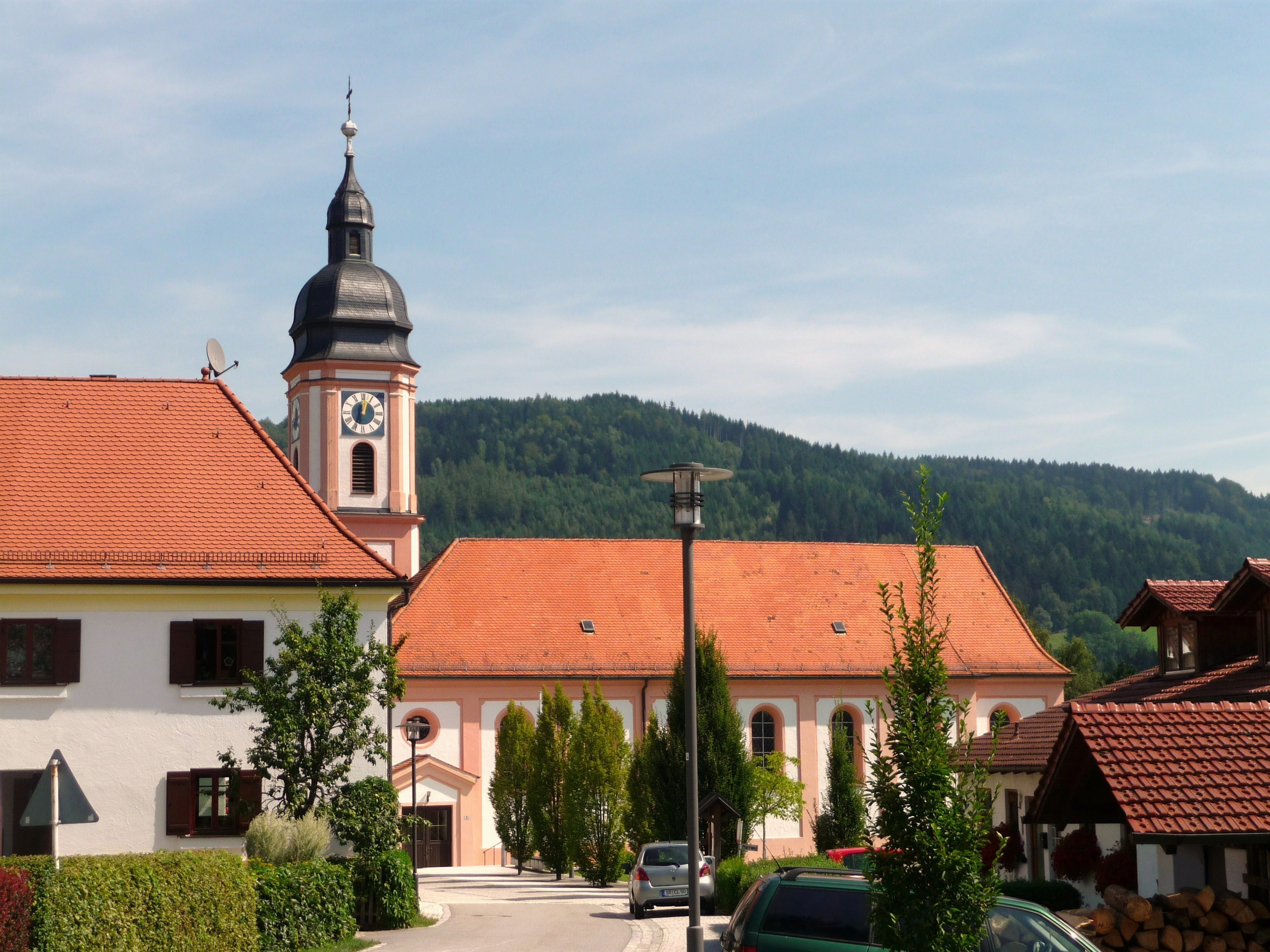
- Church of Saint Martin

- Coat of arms

- Location of Neukirchen within Straubing-Bogen district
- Interactive map of Neukirchen
- Location within Germany Location within Bavaria
- Coordinates: 48°59′N 12°46′E
- Country: Germany
- State: Bavaria
- Admin. region: Niederbayern
- District: Straubing-Bogen
- Municipal assoc.: Hunderdorf

Government
  - Mayor (2020–26): Matthias Wallner

Area
  - Total: 24.46 km^{2} (9.44 sq mi)
- Elevation: 375 m (1,230 ft)

Population (2025-12-31)
  - Total: 1,854
  - Density: 75.80/km^{2} (196.3/sq mi)
- Time zone: UTC+01:00 (CET)
  - Summer (DST): UTC+02:00 (CEST)
- Postal codes: 94362
- Dialling codes: 09961
- Vehicle registration: SR
- Website: www.neukirchen.net

Neukirchen (German pronunciation: [nɔʏˈkɪʁçn̩]) is a municipality in the district of Straubing-Bogen in Bavaria, Germany. It is located in the Donau-Wald region in the Bavarian Forest.

== Districts ==
Neukirchen has 65 districts:

- Angermühl
- Au
- Autsdorf
- Bachersgrub
- Birkhof
- Brandlehen
- Buchaberg
- Buchamühl
- Bühel
- Bühelberg
- Burkasberg
- Dießenbach
- Dießenberg
- Dörnau
- Edersberg
- Feldhof
- Fremdstuhl
- Graben
- Grad
- Hacka
- Haggn
- Hagnberg
- Hochstraß
- Höfling
- Hungerszell
- Inderbogen
- Irlach
- Irlmühle
- Kager
- Kreuzhaus
- Langholz
- Lehenfeld
- Lohhof
- Lohmühl
- Maulhof
- Mitterberg
- Mitterkogl
- Mitterwachsenberg
- Neukirchen
- Niederhofen
- Notzling
- Oberkogl
- Obermühlbach
- Oberwachsenberg
- Öd bei Buchamühl
- Oed bei Reisach
- Plenthof
- Prünst
- Pürgl
- Radmoos
- Reisach
- Rimbach
- Schelnbach
- Schickersgrub
- Seethal
- Sparr
- Steg
- Stippich
- Taußersdorf
- Thannerhof
- Unterkogl
- Untermühlbach
- Unterwachsenberg
- Unterwolfessen

== History ==
=== Early history ===
Neukirchen was first mentioned in 1126 in the deed of the monastery Oberalteich under the name Niuenchirichen. Neukirchen belonged to the Rentamt Straubing and the regional court Mitterfels of the Electorate of Bavaria.

=== Incorporations ===
On 1 January 1976 the previously independent municipality Obermühlbach, which had more inhabitants than Neukirchen, incorporated. Dörnau (1979), Birkhof and Rimbach (1980) were reclassified from Hunderdorf to Neukirchen.

=== Population ===
- 1961: 1,514 inhabitants
- 1970: 1,477 inhabitants
- 1987: 1,491 inhabitants
- 1991: 1,613 inhabitants
- 1995: 1,655 inhabitants
- 2000: 1,763 inhabitants
- 2005: 1,808 inhabitants
- 2010: 1,845 inhabitants
- 2015: 1,733 inhabitants

== Government ==
The Mayor of Neukirchen since March 2008 is Rudolf Seidenader.

== Landmarks ==
- Neukirchen is a state-approved resort. Noteworthy next to the developed cycling and hiking trails are the circular fruit garden and the nature trail Perlbachtal.
- The parish church of St. Martin is a late Baroque facility with equipment from the construction period in the mid-18th century.
- Haggn Castle

== Infrastructure ==
=== Education ===
There are the following facilities:

- Kindergartens: 50 kindergartens with 62 children (as of 1999)
- Elementary schools: one with four teachers and 59 students (as of 2017/2018)

=== Roadways ===
Neukirchen is located on State Road 2139. In 2017, a Bavaria-wide pilot project to measure the volume of motorcycles was carried out by the Bavarian Police Department. Following the successful completion of the pilot project, the Bavarian Ministry of the Interior decided at the beginning of 2018 to allow the use of noise displays nationwide. Neukirchen, in cooperation with the neighboring municipality of St. Englmar and initiated by council member Matthias Wallner, is taking on a pioneering role in Bavaria in the fight against motorcycle noise.
