= Rain (Verwaltungsgemeinschaft, Lower Bavaria) =

- Verwaltungsgemeinschaft
- Location of Rain within Straubing-Bogen district
- Interactive map of Rain
- Location within Germany Location within Bavaria
- Coordinates: 48°54′N 12°28′E
- Country: Germany
- State: Bavaria
- Admin. region: Lower Bavaria
- District: Straubing-Bogen
- Seat: Rain
- Subdivisions: 4 municipalities

Area
  - Total: 64.84 km^{2} (25.03 sq mi)

Population (2025-12-31)
  - Total: 8,149
  - Density: 125.7/km^{2} (325.5/sq mi)
- Time zone: UTC+01:00 (CET)
  - Summer (DST): UTC+02:00 (CEST)
- Website: www.vgem-rain.de

Rain is a Verwaltungsgemeinschaft (municipal association) in the district Straubing-Bogen in Bavaria, Germany. Its seat is in Rain.

It consists of the following municipalities:

1. Aholfing
2. Atting
3. Perkam
4. Rain
