= Kirchroth =

- Municipality
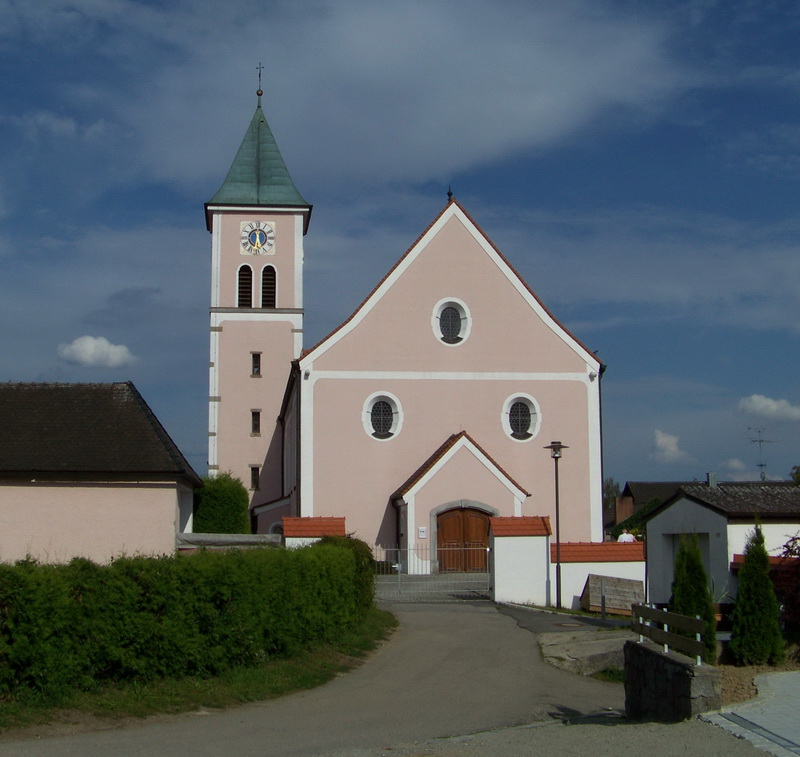
- Church of Saint Vitus

- Coat of arms

- Location of Kirchroth within Straubing-Bogen district
- Interactive map of Kirchroth
- Location within Germany Location within Bavaria
- Coordinates: 48°57′N 12°33′E
- Country: Germany
- State: Bavaria
- Admin. region: Niederbayern
- District: Straubing-Bogen

Government
  - Mayor (2020–26): Matthias Fischer (FW)

Area
  - Total: 42.82 km^{2} (16.53 sq mi)
- Elevation: 325 m (1,066 ft)

Population (2025-12-31)
  - Total: 3,964
  - Density: 92.57/km^{2} (239.8/sq mi)
- Time zone: UTC+01:00 (CET)
  - Summer (DST): UTC+02:00 (CEST)
- Postal codes: 94356
- Dialling codes: 09428
- Vehicle registration: SR
- Website: www.kirchroth.de

Kirchroth (German pronunciation: [ˈkɪʁçʁoːt]; Bavarian: Kirchroud) is a municipality in the district of Straubing-Bogen in Bavaria, Germany. It lies on the Danube River. By the local government reform of May 1978 villages Kößnach, Oberzeitldorn, Obermiethnach, Pillnach, Pondorf, Niederachdorf, as well as Aufroth and Neuroth were incorporated.

== Notable people ==
The social democratic politician Albert Roßhaupter (1878–1962) was born in the district Pillnach.
