= Parkstetten =

- Municipality
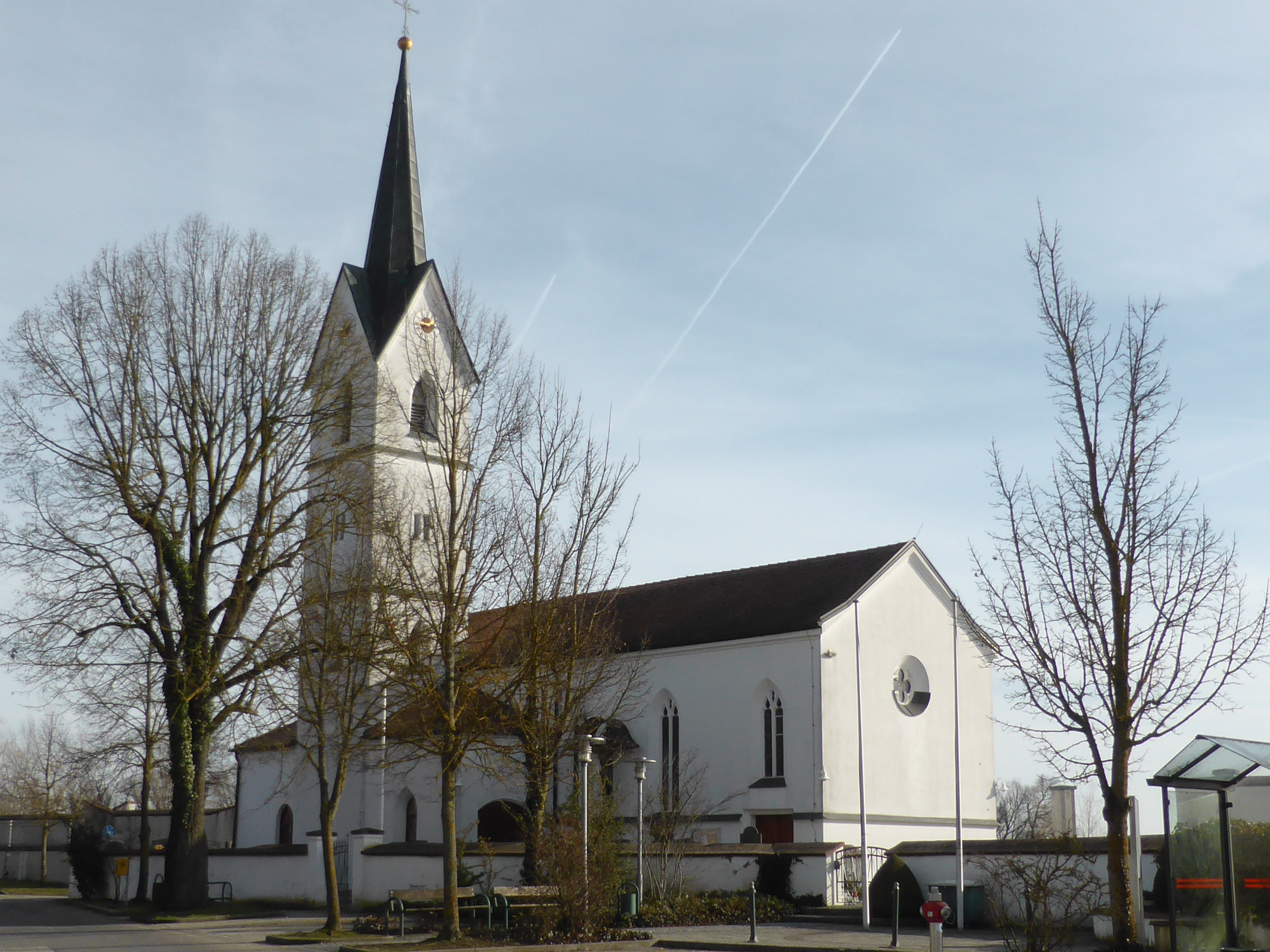
- Church of Saint Martin in Reibersdorf

- Coat of arms

- Location of Parkstetten within Straubing-Bogen district
- Interactive map of Parkstetten
- Location within Germany Location within Bavaria
- Coordinates: 48°55′05″N 12°35′49″E
- Country: Germany
- State: Bavaria
- Admin. region: Niederbayern
- District: Straubing-Bogen

Government
  - Mayor (2020–26): Martin Panten

Area
  - Total: 19.5 km^{2} (7.5 sq mi)
- Elevation: 319 m (1,047 ft)

Population (2025-12-31)
  - Total: 3,385
  - Density: 174/km^{2} (450/sq mi)
- Time zone: UTC+01:00 (CET)
  - Summer (DST): UTC+02:00 (CEST)
- Postal codes: 94365
- Dialling codes: 09421
- Vehicle registration: SR
- Website: www.parkstetten.de

Parkstetten (German pronunciation: [paʁkˈʃtɛtn̩]) is a municipality in the district of Straubing-Bogen in Bavaria, Germany.
