= Irlbach =

- Municipality
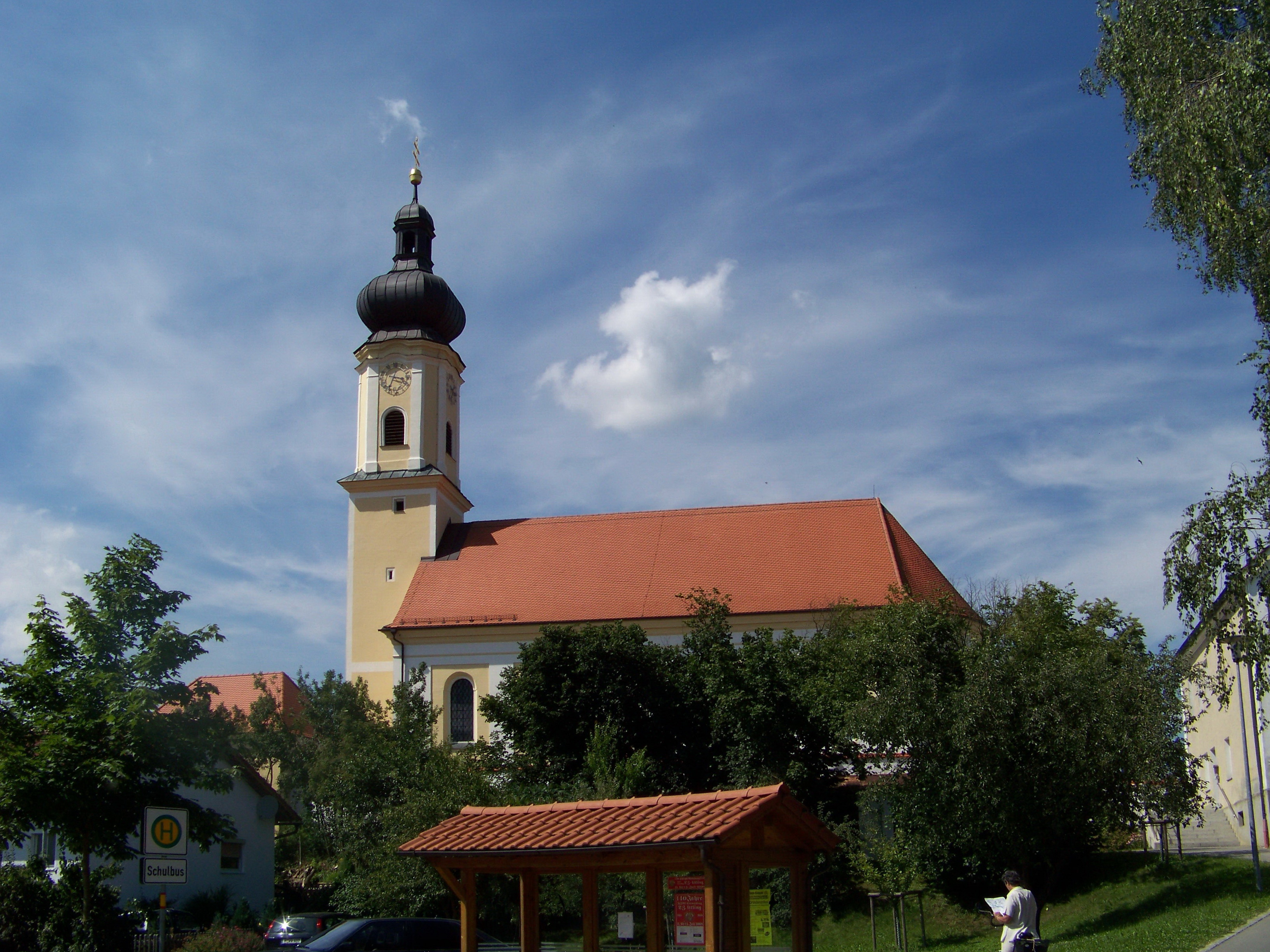
- Church of the Assumption of the Virgin Mary

- Coat of arms

- Location of Irlbach within Straubing-Bogen district
- Interactive map of Irlbach
- Location within Germany Location within Bavaria
- Coordinates: 48°51′N 12°45′E
- Country: Germany
- State: Bavaria
- Admin. region: Niederbayern
- District: Straubing-Bogen
- Municipal assoc.: Straßkirchen

Government
  - Mayor (2020–26): Armin Soller

Area
  - Total: 15.84 km^{2} (6.12 sq mi)
- Elevation: 324 m (1,063 ft)

Population (2025-12-31)
  - Total: 1,129
  - Density: 71.28/km^{2} (184.6/sq mi)
- Time zone: UTC+01:00 (CET)
  - Summer (DST): UTC+02:00 (CEST)
- Postal codes: 94342
- Dialling codes: 09424
- Vehicle registration: SR
- Website: www.irlbach.de

Irlbach (German pronunciation: [ˈɪʁlbax]; Central Bavarian: Irlbo) is a municipality in the district of Straubing-Bogen in Bavaria, Germany. It lies on the Danube River.
