= Schwarzach (Verwaltungsgemeinschaft) =

- Verwaltungsgemeinschaft
- Location of Schwarzach within Straubing-Bogen district
- Interactive map of Schwarzach
- Location within Germany Location within Bavaria
- Coordinates: 48°55′N 12°49′E
- Country: Germany
- State: Bavaria
- Admin. region: Lower Bavaria
- District: Straubing-Bogen
- Seat: Schwarzach
- Subdivisions: 4 municipalities

Area
  - Total: 94.52 km^{2} (36.49 sq mi)

Population (2025-12-31)
  - Total: 7,790
  - Density: 82.4/km^{2} (213/sq mi)
- Time zone: UTC+01:00 (CET)
  - Summer (DST): UTC+02:00 (CEST)
- Website: www.vgem-schwarzach.de

Schwarzach is a Verwaltungsgemeinschaft (municipal association) in the district Straubing-Bogen in Bavaria, Germany. Its seat is in Schwarzach.

It consists of the following municipalities:

1. Mariaposching
2. Niederwinkling
3. Perasdorf
4. Schwarzach
