= Stallwang =

- Municipality
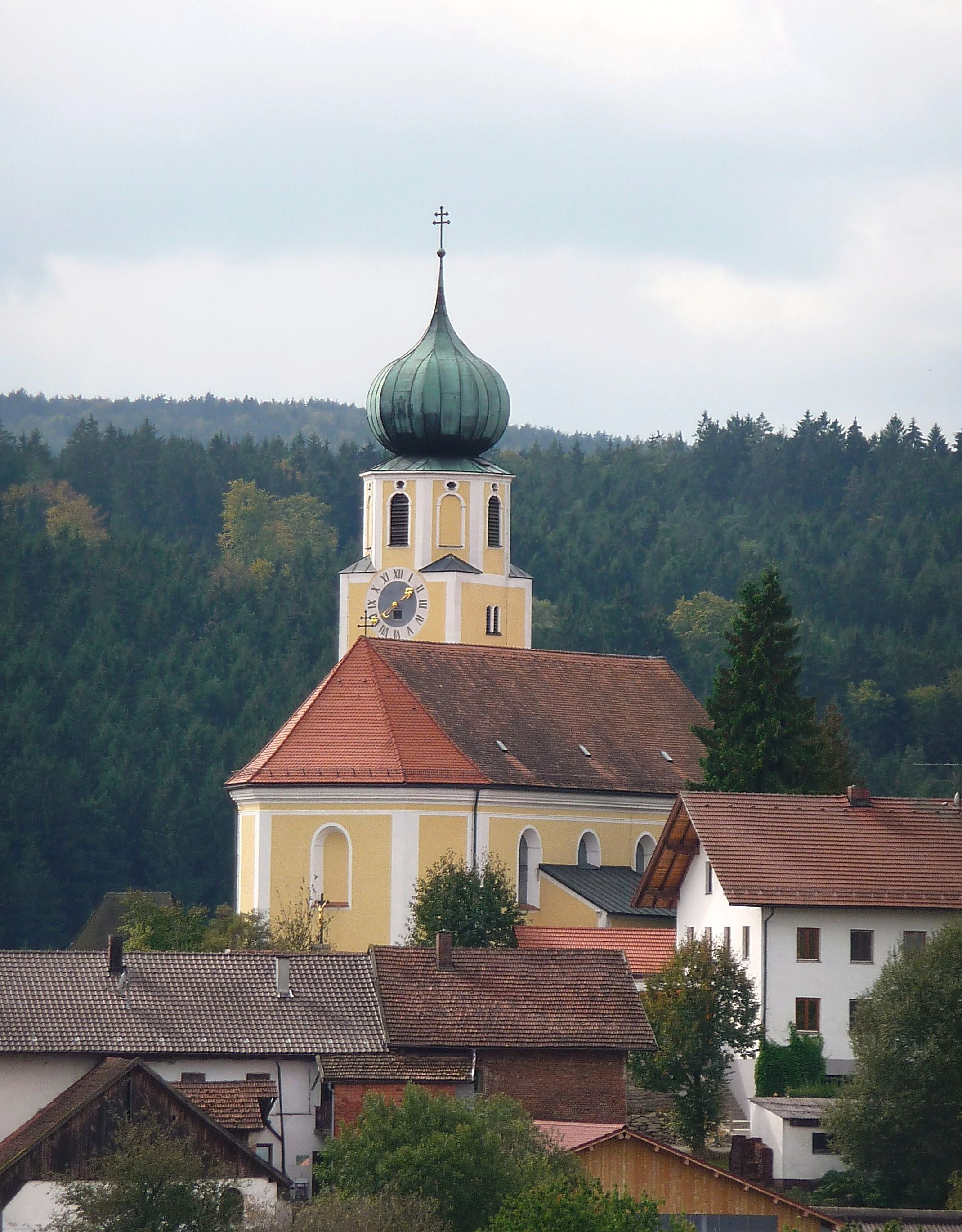
- Church of Saint Michael

- Coat of arms

- Location of Stallwang within Straubing-Bogen district
- Interactive map of Stallwang
- Location within Germany Location within Bavaria
- Coordinates: 49°3′N 12°40′E
- Country: Germany
- State: Bavaria
- Admin. region: Niederbayern
- District: Straubing-Bogen
- Municipal assoc.: Stallwang

Government
  - Mayor (2020–26): Max Dietl (CSU)

Area
  - Total: 20.59 km^{2} (7.95 sq mi)
- Elevation: 350–697 m (1,148–2,287 ft)

Population (2025-12-31)
  - Total: 1,412
  - Density: 68.58/km^{2} (177.6/sq mi)
- Time zone: UTC+01:00 (CET)
  - Summer (DST): UTC+02:00 (CEST)
- Postal codes: 94375
- Dialling codes: 09964
- Vehicle registration: SR
- Website: www.Stallwang.de

Stallwang (German pronunciation: [ˈʃtalvaŋ]) is a municipality in the district of Straubing-Bogen in Bavaria, Germany.
