= Wiesenfelden =

- Municipality
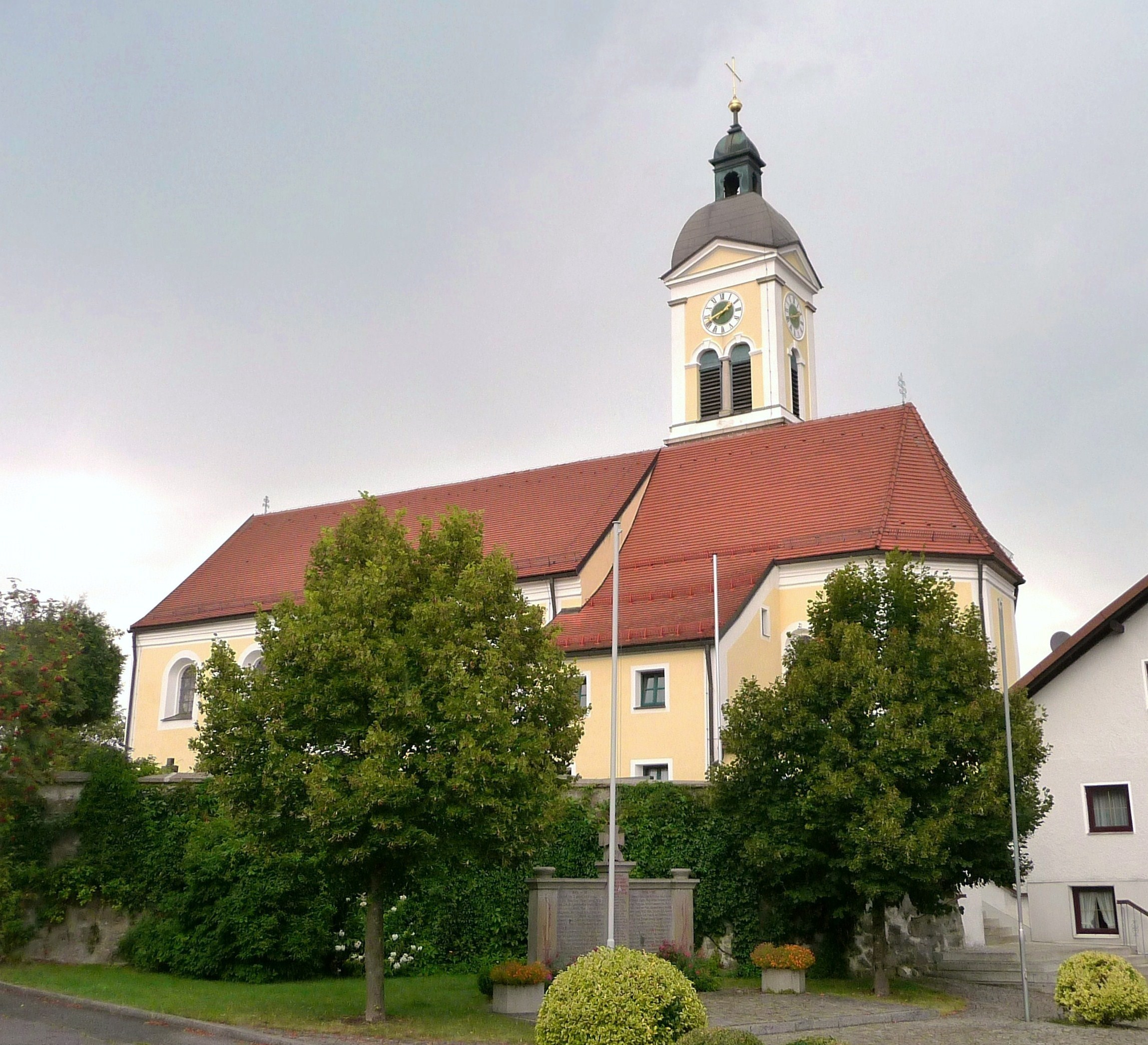
- Church of the Assumption of the Virgin Mary

- Coat of arms

- Location of Wiesenfelden within Straubing-Bogen district
- Interactive map of Wiesenfelden
- Location within Germany Location within Bavaria
- Coordinates: 49°2′N 12°32′E
- Country: Germany
- State: Bavaria
- Admin. region: Niederbayern
- District: Straubing-Bogen

Government
  - Mayor (2020–26): Andreas Urban

Area
  - Total: 78.2 km^{2} (30.2 sq mi)
- Elevation: 610 m (2,000 ft)

Population (2025-12-31)
  - Total: 3,962
  - Density: 50.7/km^{2} (131/sq mi)
- Time zone: UTC+01:00 (CET)
  - Summer (DST): UTC+02:00 (CEST)
- Postal codes: 94344
- Dialling codes: 09966
- Vehicle registration: SR
- Website: www.wiesenfelden.de

Wiesenfelden (German pronunciation: [viːzn̩ˈfɛldn̩]) is a municipality in the district of Straubing-Bogen in Bavaria, Germany.
