= Gäuboden =

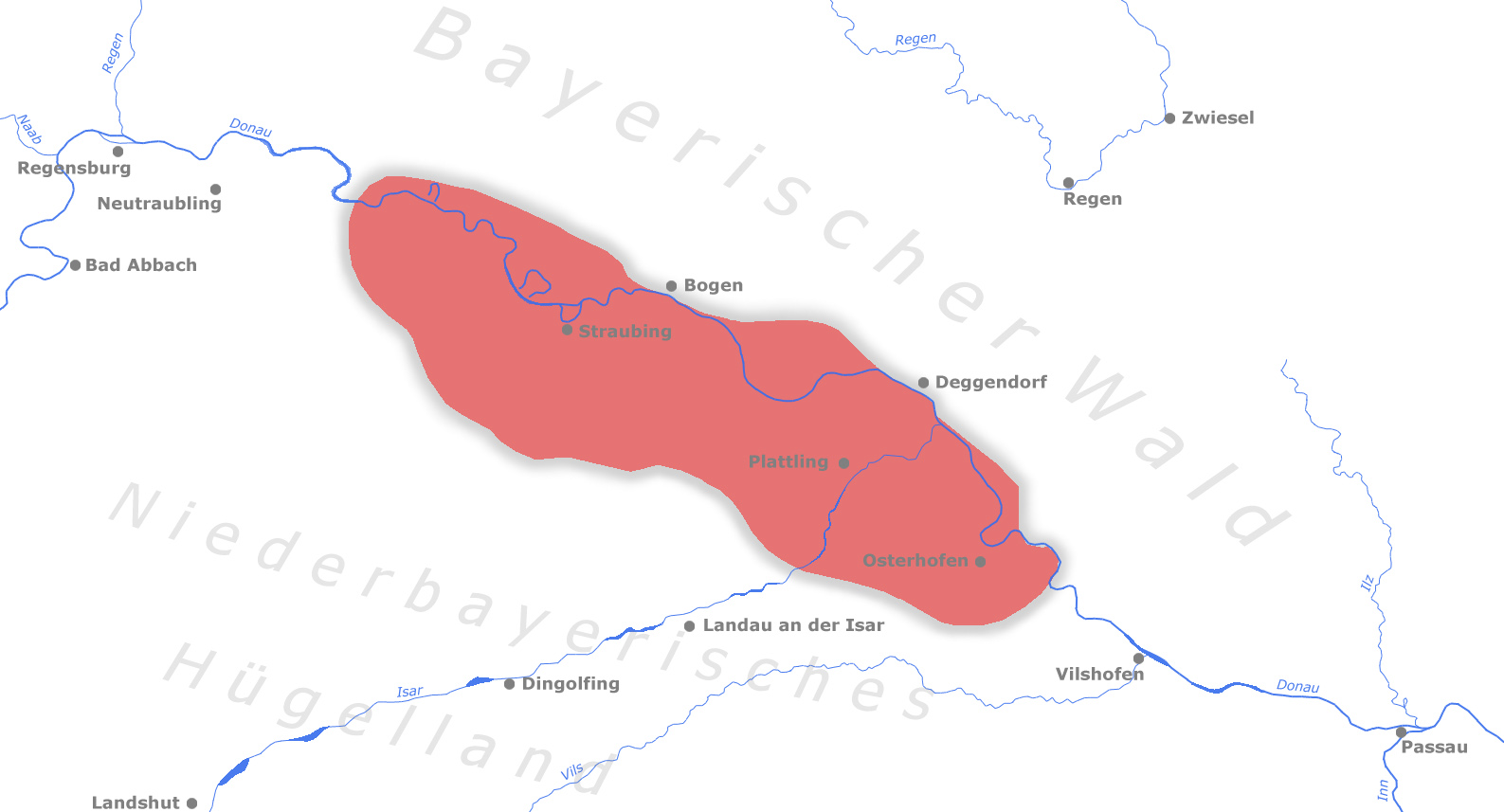
The Gäuboden

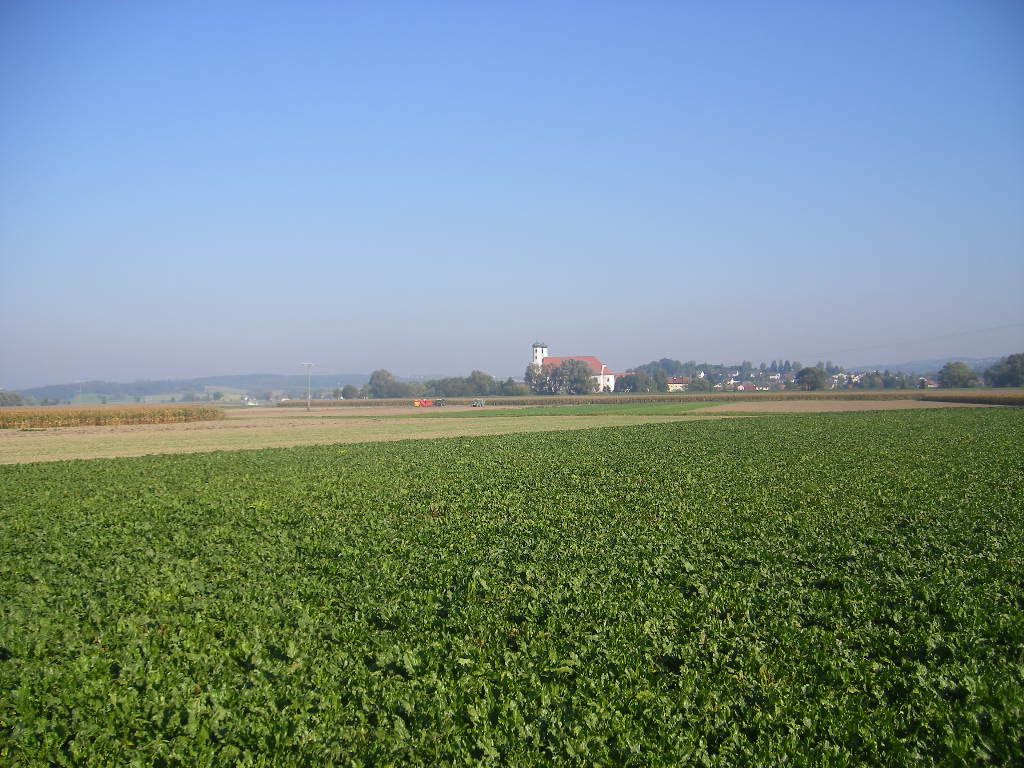
Gäuboden landscape with Oberalteich Monastery in the background

The Gäuboden (German pronunciation: [ˈɡɔʏˌboːdn̩]; also referred to in German as the Dungau) is a region in Lower Bavaria in southern Germany without any clear geographic or cultural boundaries, that covers an area about 15 kilometres wide south of the River Danube and the Bavarian Forest, beginning opposite Wörth an der Donau and stretching as far as Künzing. The largest town in the region is Straubing, which is often called the centre of the Gäuboden. The Gäuboden is one of the largest loess regions in southern Germany.

== Literature ==
- Franz Krojer: Aufschluss des Gäubodens. Differenz, München 2006.
- Erwin Rutte: Rhein – Main – Donau. Eine geologische Geschichte. Thobecke, Sigmaringen 1987, ISBN 3-7995-7045-4.
- Dieter Vogel (Hrsg.): Der Gäuboden. Heimatbuch. Kiebitz Buch, Vilsbiburg 1996, ISBN 3-9804048-2-X.
- Bayerisches Landesamt für Umweltschutz. Ornithologische Arbeitsgemeinschaft Ostbayern: Lebensraum Donautal. Ergebnisse einer ornitho-ökologischen Untersuchung zwischen Straubing und Vilshofen, München, Wien, R. Oldenbourg Verlag, 1978 (Schriftenreihe Naturschutz und Landschaftspflege, Heft 11), ISBN 3-486-22921-4
