= Hadriwa =

Hadriwa may refer to the following places in Bavaria, Germany:

Settlements

- Hadriwa (Nittenau), village in the borough of Nittenau, county of Schwandorf
- Hadriwa (Elisabethszell), abandoned hamlet in the former municipality of Elisabethszell

Mountains

- Hadriwa (Bavarian Forest, Haibach), 922 m, in the Bavarian Forest, county of Straubing-Bogen
- Hadriwa (Bavarian Forest, Zell), 677 m, in the Bavarian Forest, county of Cham
