= Gallner =

Mountain in Germany

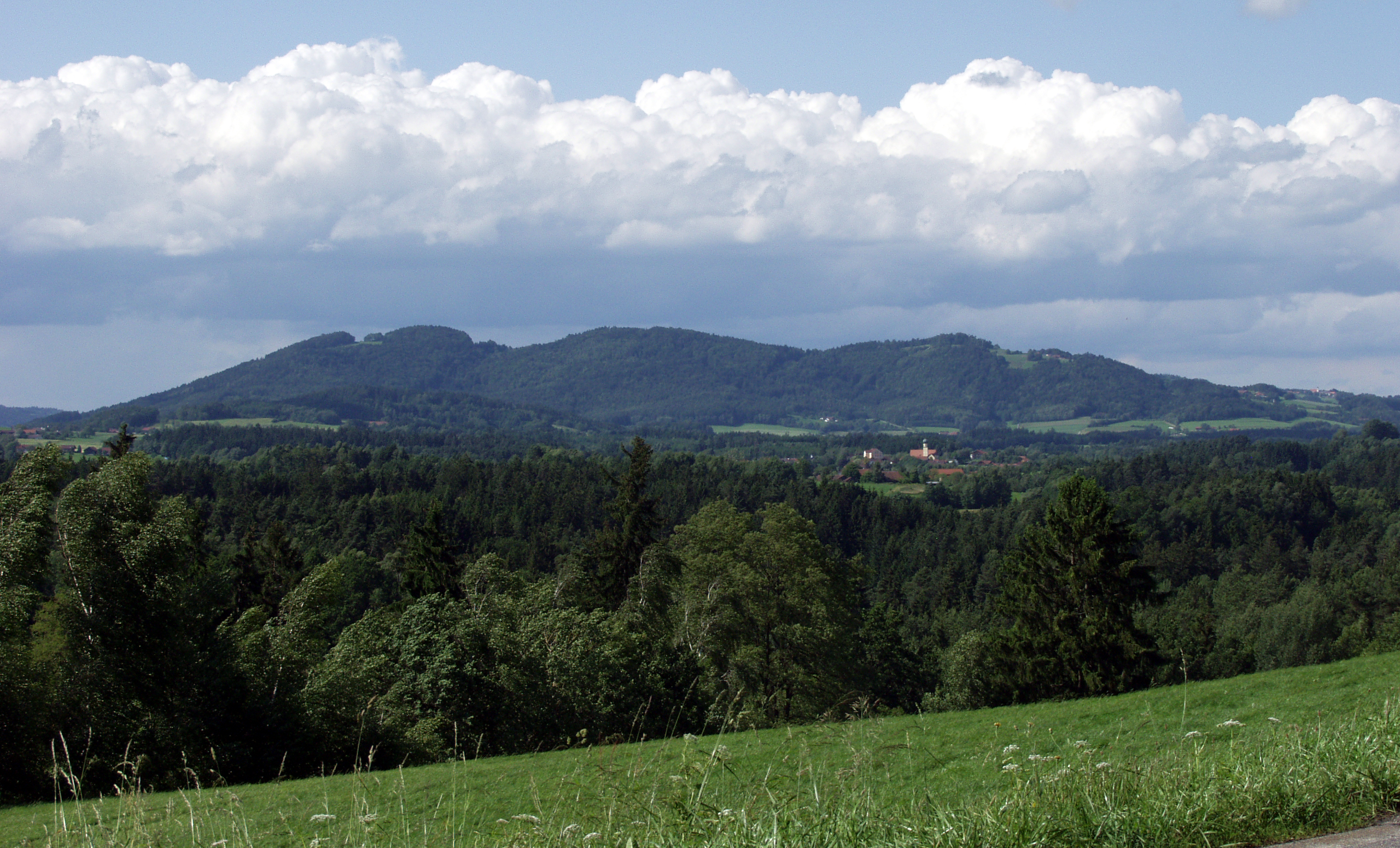
- The Gallner with its three individual summits

Highest point
- Elevation: 710 m above sea level (NN) (2,330 ft)
- Prominence: 187 m ↓ Konzell-Streifenau
- Isolation: 4.75 km → Sicklasberg
- Coordinates: 49°02′52″N 12°40′39″E

Geography
- Location within Bavaria
- Location: Straubing-Bogen, Bavaria, Germany
- Parent range: Bavarian Forest

The Gallner (Gallner Berg:710 m) is a mountain ridge near Konzell in the Bavarian Forest that runs from west to east between the valley of the Kinsach in the west and the Menach valley. The E8 European long distance path runs over it.

== Name ==
The mountain is called the Gallner because it was used as a mountain pasture for heifers (German: Galtvieh). An old form of the name of the ridge in the early 18th century was Goldner.

== Description ==
The mountain is unusual in having three almost equally high summits or kuppen: the Gallner Berg (710 m)(49.04832°N 12.67689°E), Kühleite (704 m)(49.04825°N 12.68372°E) and Blumerberg (682 m)(49.04799°N 12.69476°E).

The summit region and the north and east mountainsides are within the municipality of Konzell. The southern mountainside is divided between the municipalities of Haibach, Haselbach and Rattiszell. Its western slopes belong to Stallwang.

Northwest of the summit of the Gallner Berg, at about 630 metres, is the farmstead of Gallner, which belongs to Konzell. Here is the daughter church of Saint Sixtus, built in the late 15th century.
