= Hadriwa (Bavarian Forest, Haibach) =

Mountain in Germany

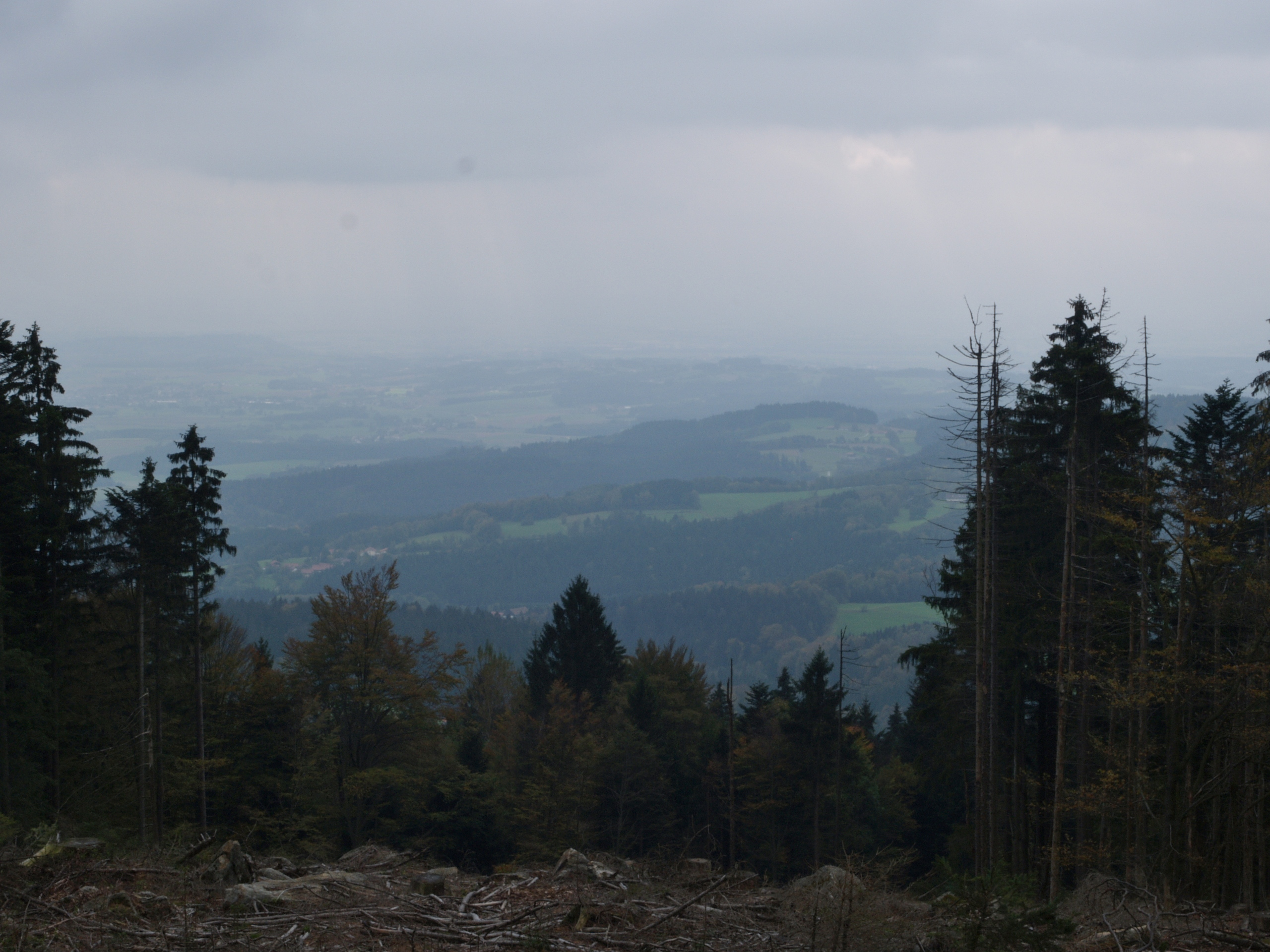
- View of the Danube Plain from the crest of the Hadriwa

Highest point
- Elevation: 922 m (3,025 ft)
- Prominence: 182 m ↓ Grün (Sankt Englmar)
- Isolation: 2.77 km → Käsplatte
- Coordinates: 49°2′5.14″N 12°45′58.92″E

Geography
- Location within Bavaria
- Location: Straubing-Bogen, Bavaria, Germany
- Parent range: Bavarian Forest

The Hadriwa [Hádriwɐ] is a completely forested mountain, 922 m, near Elisabethszell in the municipality of Haibach in the Bavarian Forest in Germany. It is the highest point on the ridge between the Klinglbach and Grüner Bach in the east and the Elisabethszeller Bach and the Menach and its side streams in the west.

According to a survey, the Hadriwa is one of 16 possible top sites for pumped-storage hydroelectric stations in Bavaria. In Straubing-Bogen county, the Pfarrerberg to the south and the Kobelberg near Wiesenfelden are also among the sites deemed suitable for such installations.

Until the early 20th century, there was a farmstead near the summit, also called the Hadriwa. Today its traces are still visible in the form of the remains of a building and well-preserved rubble stone walls.

The origin of the name is unclear. One possible meaning is based on the Czech word, Hadr, for disagreement, quarrel, strife and the fact that the boundary between the abbeys of Oberalteich and Windberg passed through this area. Another possibility is that it relates to a Czech word, Had, for snake.

There is another mountain called the Hadriwa (677 m) in the Bavarian Forest in the municipality of Zell in the county of Cham.
