= Konzell =

- Municipality
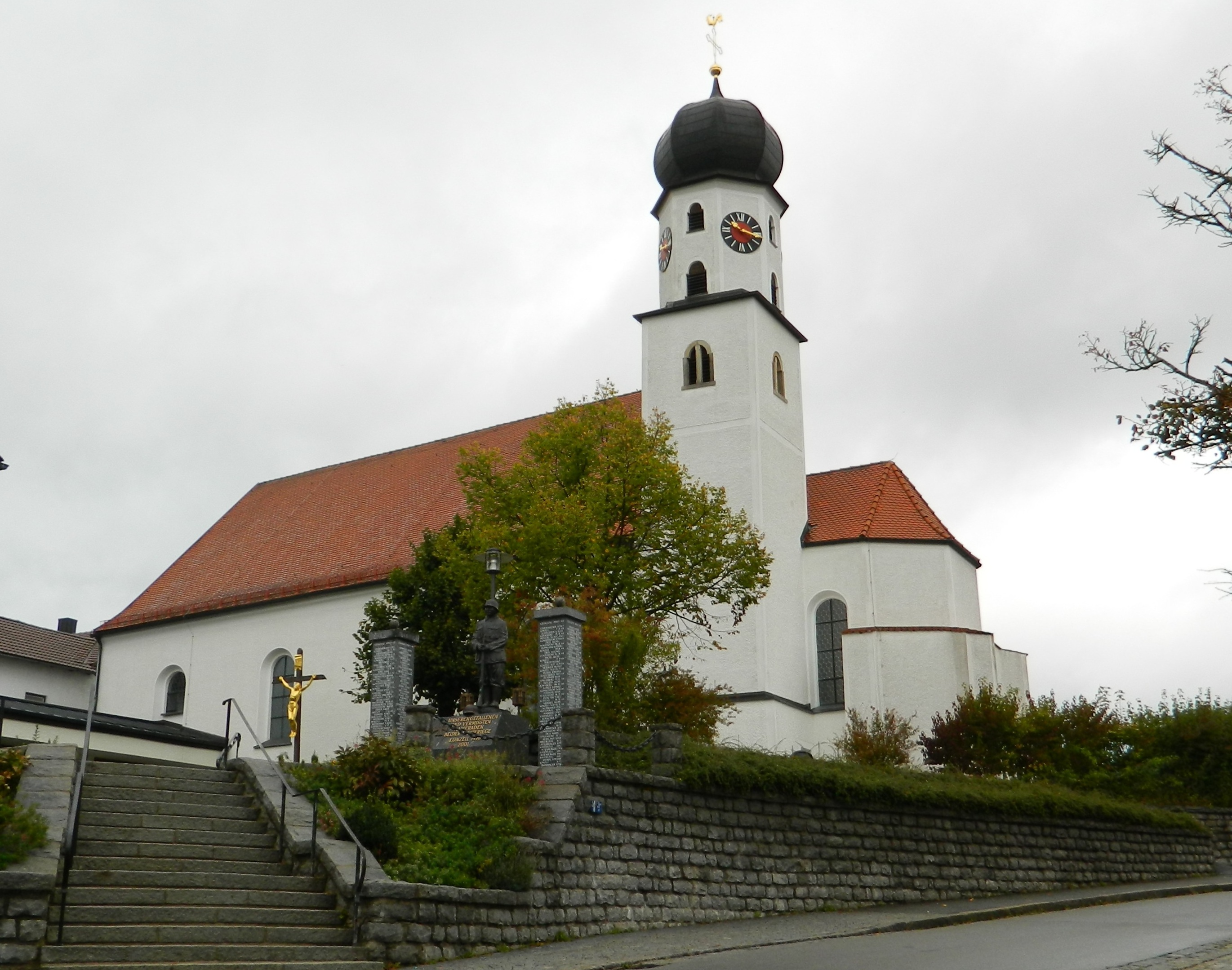
- Church of Saint Martin

- Coat of arms

- Location of Konzell within Straubing-Bogen district
- Interactive map of Konzell
- Location within Germany Location within Bavaria
- Coordinates: 49°4′N 12°43′E
- Country: Germany
- State: Bavaria
- Admin. region: Niederbayern
- District: Straubing-Bogen

Government
  - Mayor (2020–26): Hans Kienberger (CSU)

Area
  - Total: 26.75 km^{2} (10.33 sq mi)
- Elevation: 500–900 m (1,600–3,000 ft)

Population (2025-12-31)
  - Total: 1,827
  - Density: 68.30/km^{2} (176.9/sq mi)
- Time zone: UTC+01:00 (CET)
  - Summer (DST): UTC+02:00 (CEST)
- Postal codes: 94357
- Dialling codes: 09963
- Vehicle registration: SR
- Website: www.konzell.de

Konzell (German: [kɔnˈtsɛl]) is a municipality in the district of Straubing-Bogen in Bavaria, Germany.

== Geography ==
Konzell is situated in the south of the Bavarian Forest. Here is the spring of the Menach, which flows in the valley of Menach direction the Bogen.

=== Mountains ===
The Gallner Berg to the south, the western summit of the Gallner, and the Kramerschopf to the east are the highest points, each reaching 710 metres. To the north is the Himmelberg at 680 metres.

== Urban districts ==
To Konzell belong the urban districts Auggenbach, Denkzell, Gossersdorf and Kasparzell.

== Impressions ==
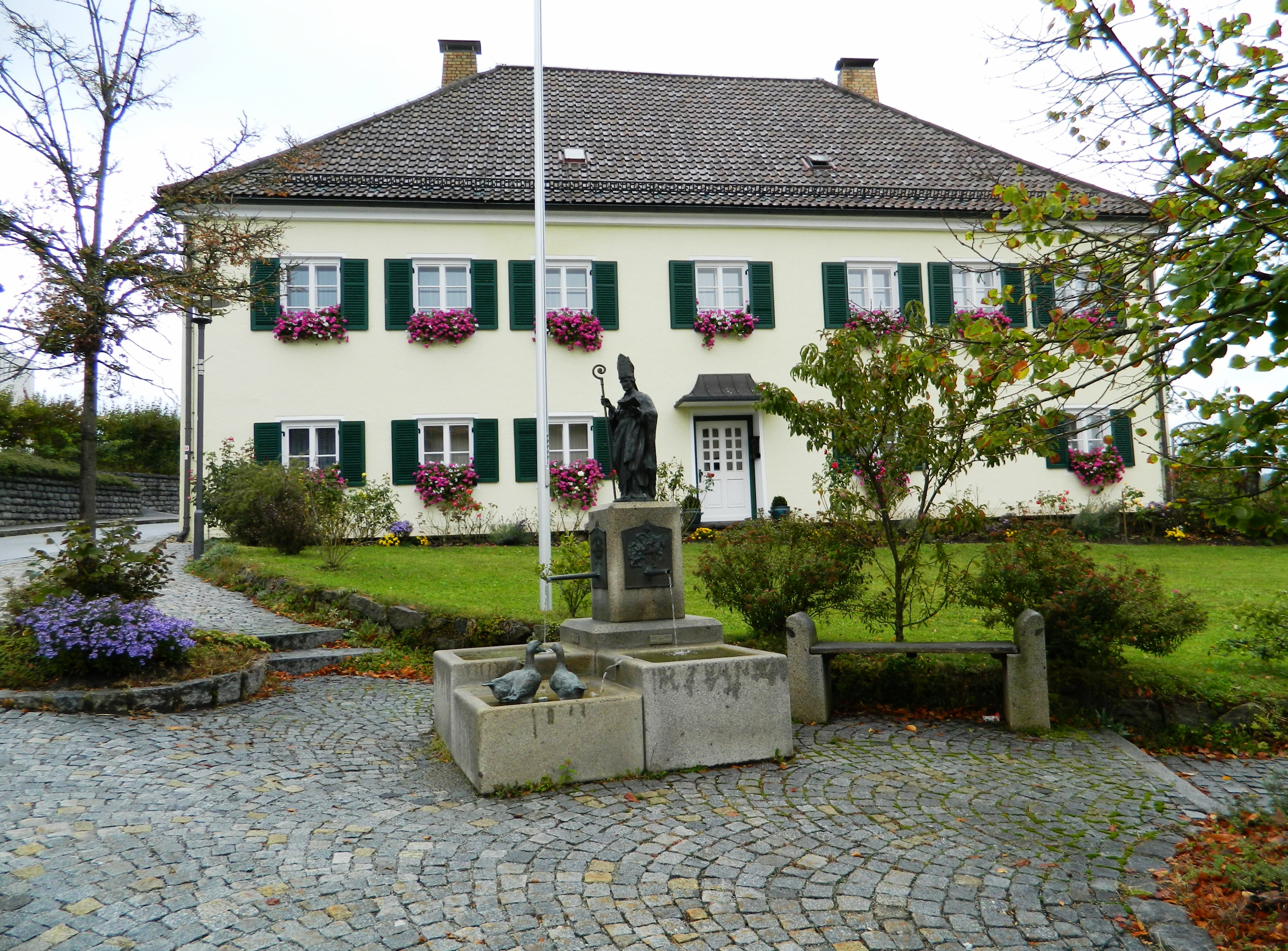
Rectory

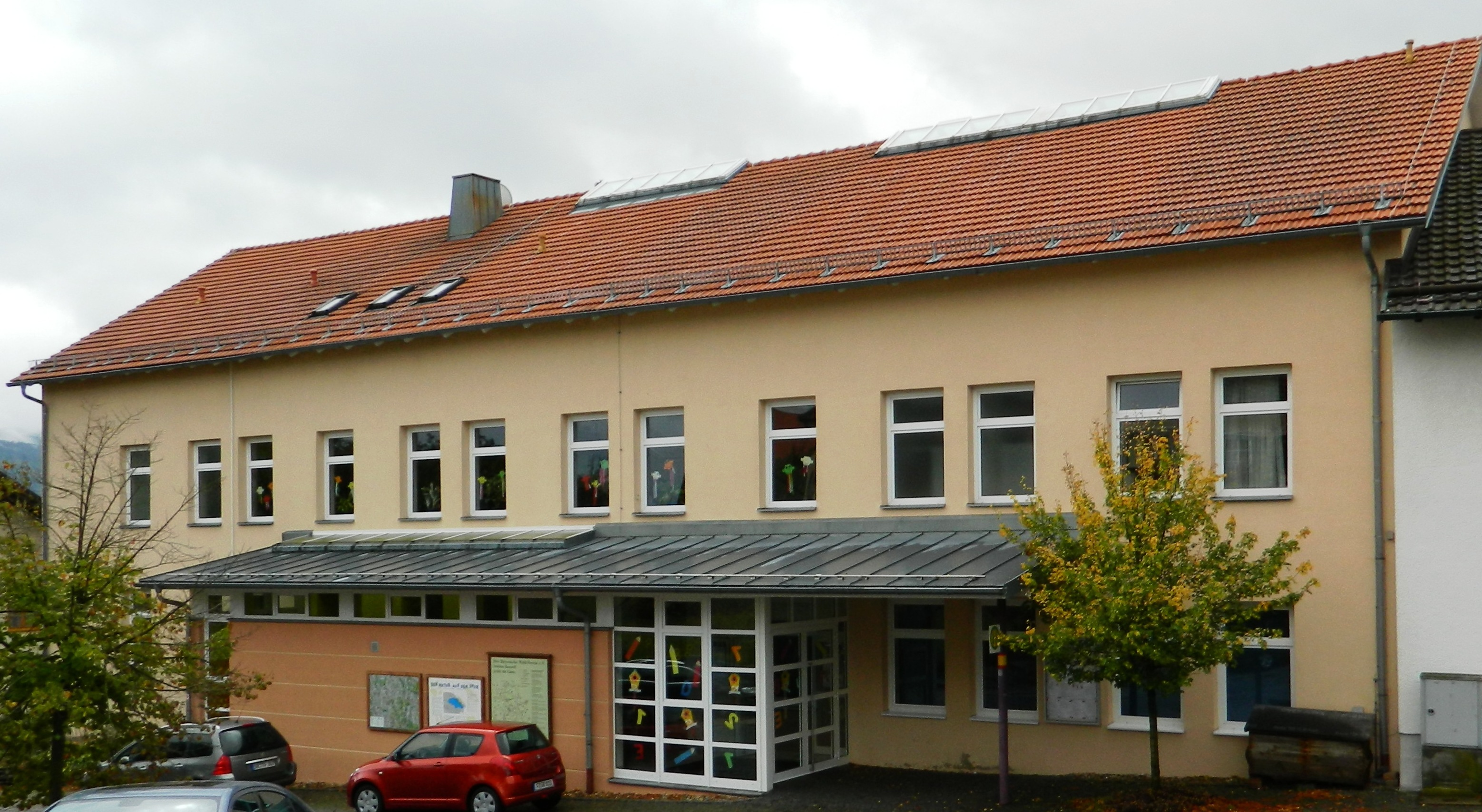
Primary school

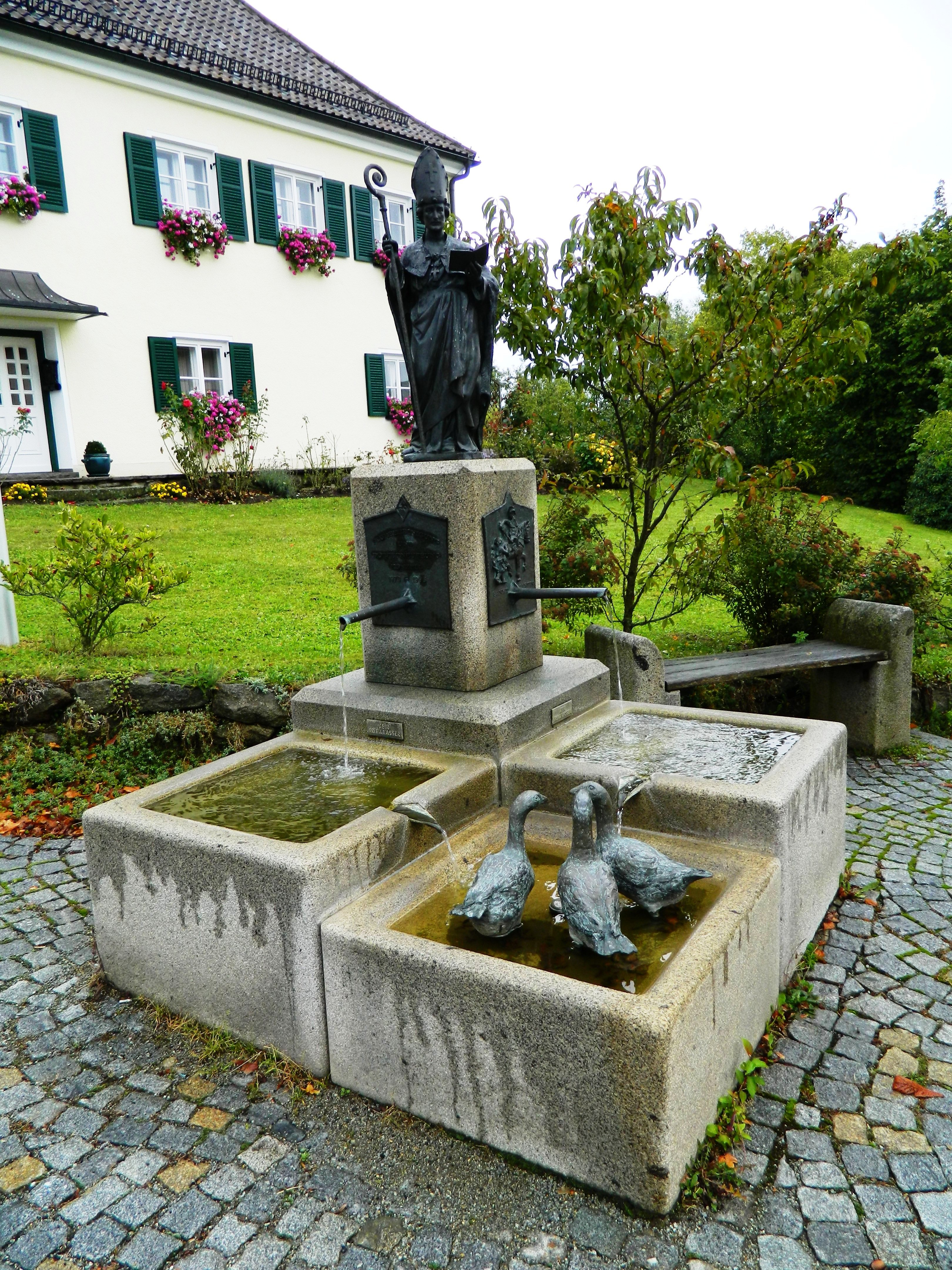
fountain near school and church

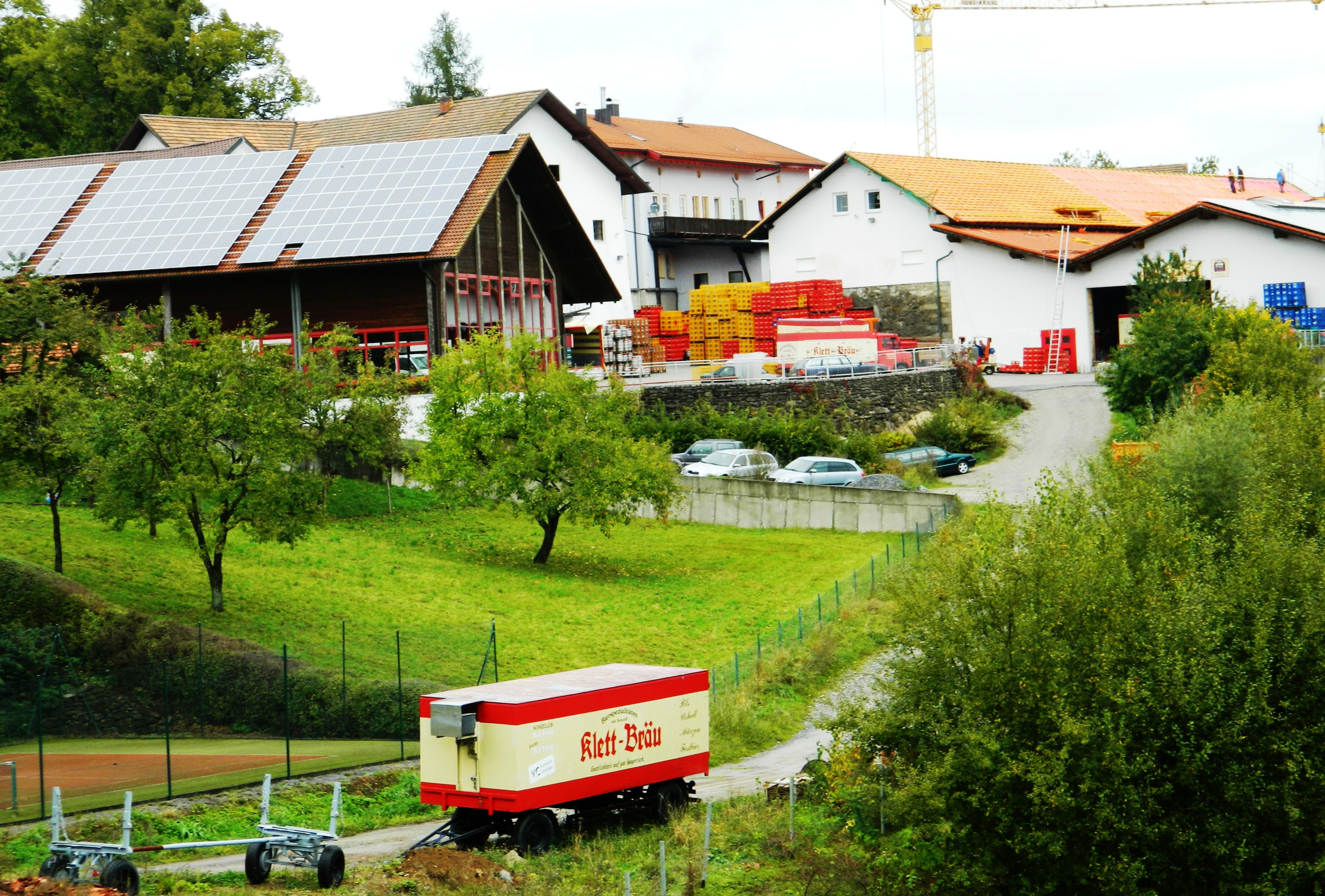
Brewerie (Klett-Bräu)
