= Kobelberg =

Mountain in Germany

- Location within Bavaria

Highest point
- Elevation: 703 m (2,306 ft)
- Prominence: 75 m
- Isolation: 2.57 km → Thurasdorfer Berg, "Büscherl"
- Coordinates: 49°0′51″N 12°31′9″E

Geography
- Location: Straubing-Bogen, Bavaria
- Parent range: Bavarian Forest

The Kobelberg is a forested mountain ridge running from north to south within the municipality of Wiesenfelden in the Bavarian Forest in southern Germany. It lies south of the village of Schiederhof between the source regions of the Großer Leitenbach to the east and the Breimbach to the west. Its three summits have heights of 692 m, 698.3 m und 703 m.

According to a 2014 survey, the Kobelberg is one of 17 possible top sites for a pumped storage hydroelectric station in Bavaria. In the county of Straubing-Bogen the mountains of Pfarrerberg and Hadriwa are also in the frame.
