= Ascha =

- Municipality
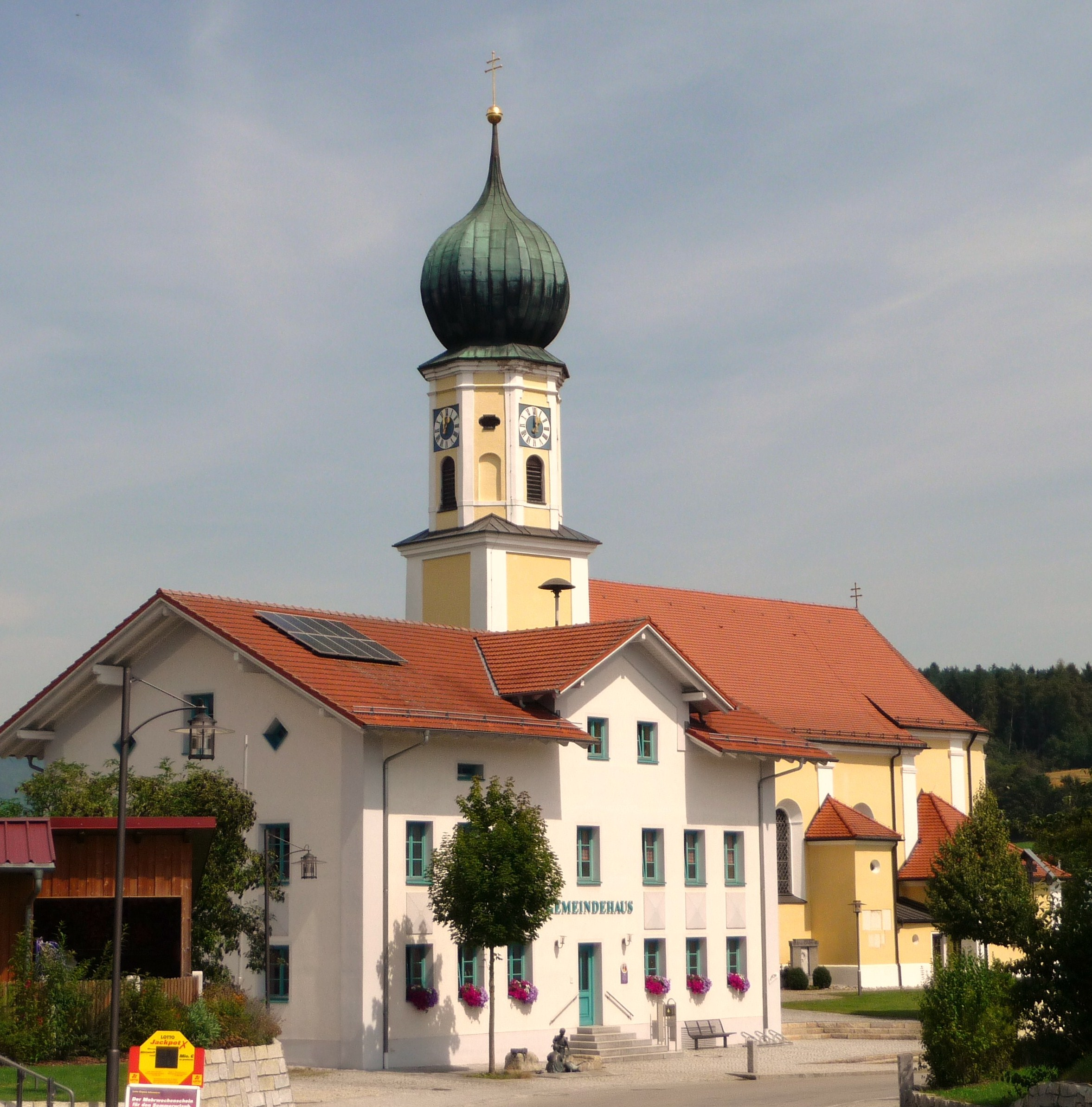
- Town hall and the Church of the Assumption of the Virgin Mary

- Coat of arms

- Location of Ascha within Straubing-Bogen district
- Interactive map of Ascha
- Location within Germany Location within Bavaria
- Coordinates: 49°0′N 12°38′E
- Country: Germany
- State: Bavaria
- Admin. region: Niederbayern
- District: Straubing-Bogen
- Municipal assoc.: Mitterfels

Government
  - Mayor (2020–26): Wolfgang Zirngibl (CSU)

Area
  - Total: 19.53 km^{2} (7.54 sq mi)
- Elevation: 339 m (1,112 ft)

Population (2025-12-31)
  - Total: 1,597
  - Density: 81.77/km^{2} (211.8/sq mi)
- Time zone: UTC+01:00 (CET)
  - Summer (DST): UTC+02:00 (CEST)
- Postal codes: 94347
- Dialling codes: 09961
- Vehicle registration: SR
- Website: www.ascha.de

Ascha (German pronunciation: [ˈaʃa]) is a municipality in the district of Straubing-Bogen in Bavaria, Germany.
