= Mitterfels =

- Municipality
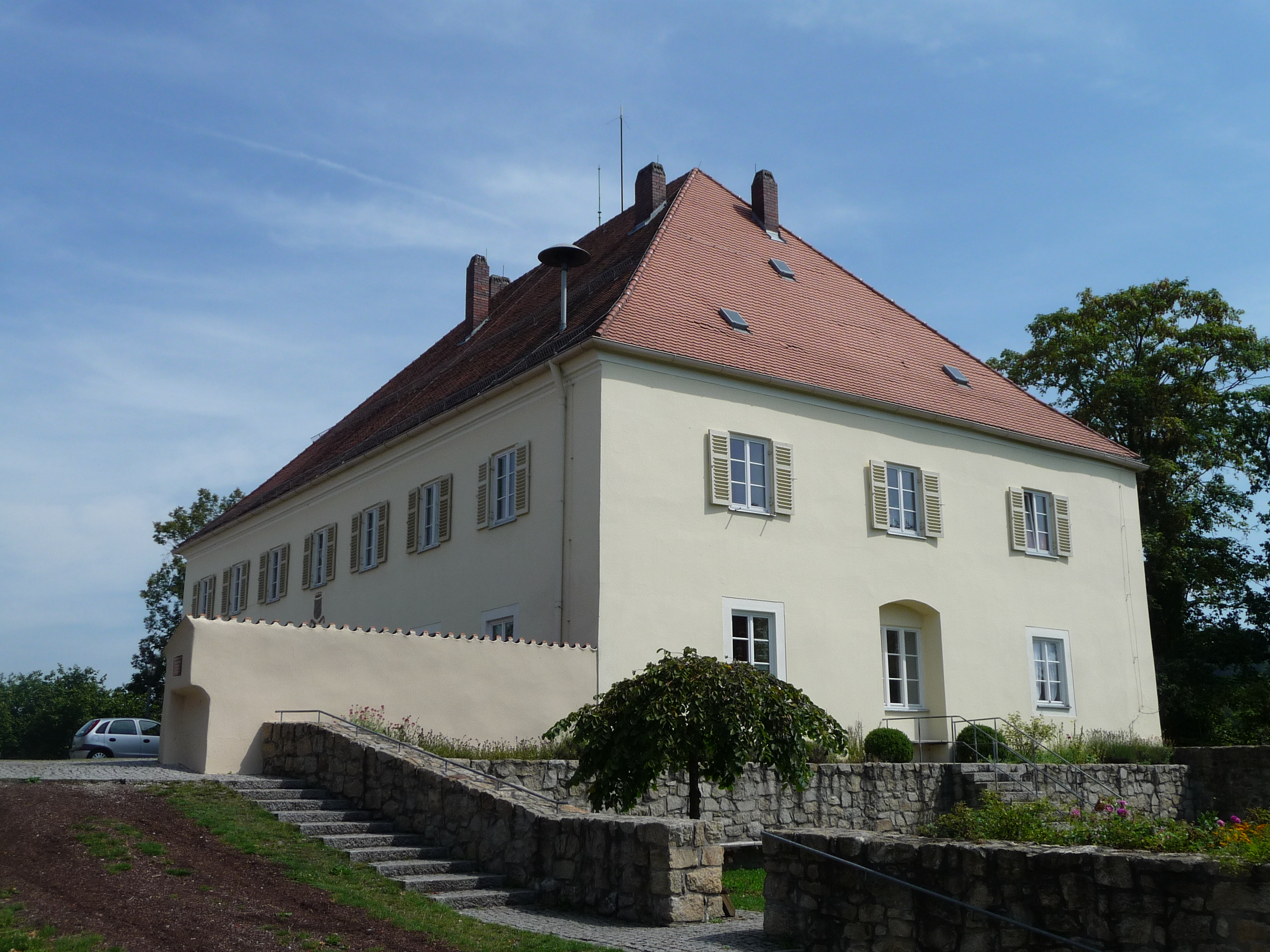
- Town hall

- Coat of arms

- Location of Mitterfels within Straubing-Bogen district
- Interactive map of Mitterfels
- Location within Germany Location within Bavaria
- Coordinates: 48°58′N 12°41′E
- Country: Germany
- State: Bavaria
- Admin. region: Niederbayern
- District: Straubing-Bogen
- Municipal assoc.: Mitterfels

Government
  - Mayor (2020–26): Andreas Liebl (FW)

Area
  - Total: 14.23 km^{2} (5.49 sq mi)
- Elevation: 407 m (1,335 ft)

Population (2025-12-31)
  - Total: 2,796
  - Density: 196.5/km^{2} (508.9/sq mi)
- Time zone: UTC+01:00 (CET)
  - Summer (DST): UTC+02:00 (CEST)
- Postal codes: 94360
- Dialling codes: 09961
- Vehicle registration: SR
- Website: www.mitterfels.de

Mitterfels (German pronunciation: [ˈmɪtɐfɛls]) is a municipality in the district of Straubing-Bogen in Bavaria, Germany. It is the head of the Verwaltungsgemeinschaft Mitterfels.

== Geography ==
Mitterfels is located in the region between the Danube and the Bavarian Forest.

== History ==
In 1104 the dukes of Bogen founded the Monastery Oberalteich. The Castle of Mitterfels was first mentioned in 1194. The Township in today's extent was founded in 1818.

At the census in the year 2000, 2,372 inhabitants lived in Mitterfels.

The mayor of the town was Heinrich Stenzel (Community of Independent Voters). He came into office in 2002 as successor of Werner Lang. Now it's 1. Bürgermeister Andreas Liebl (FWG).

== Education ==
In the year 1999, the following institutions were established:

- A nursery with 70 places and 81 children
- An elementary school with 22 teachers and 362 pupils
