= Mitterfels (Verwaltungsgemeinschaft) =

- Verwaltungsgemeinschaft
- Location of Mitterfels within Straubing-Bogen district
- Interactive map of Mitterfels
- Location within Germany Location within Bavaria
- Coordinates: 48°58′N 12°41′E
- Country: Germany
- State: Bavaria
- Admin. region: Lower Bavaria
- District: Straubing-Bogen
- Seat: Mitterfels
- Subdivisions: 4 municipalities

Area
  - Total: 63.7 km^{2} (24.6 sq mi)

Population (2025-12-31)
  - Total: 7,270
  - Density: 114/km^{2} (296/sq mi)
- Time zone: UTC+01:00 (CET)
  - Summer (DST): UTC+02:00 (CEST)
- Website: www.vg-mitterfels.de

Mitterfels is a Verwaltungsgemeinschaft (municipal association) in the district Straubing-Bogen in Bavaria, Germany. Its seat is in Mitterfels.

It consists of the following municipalities:

1. Ascha
2. Falkenfels
3. Haselbach
4. Mitterfels
