= Elisabethszell =

- Ortsteil of Haibach
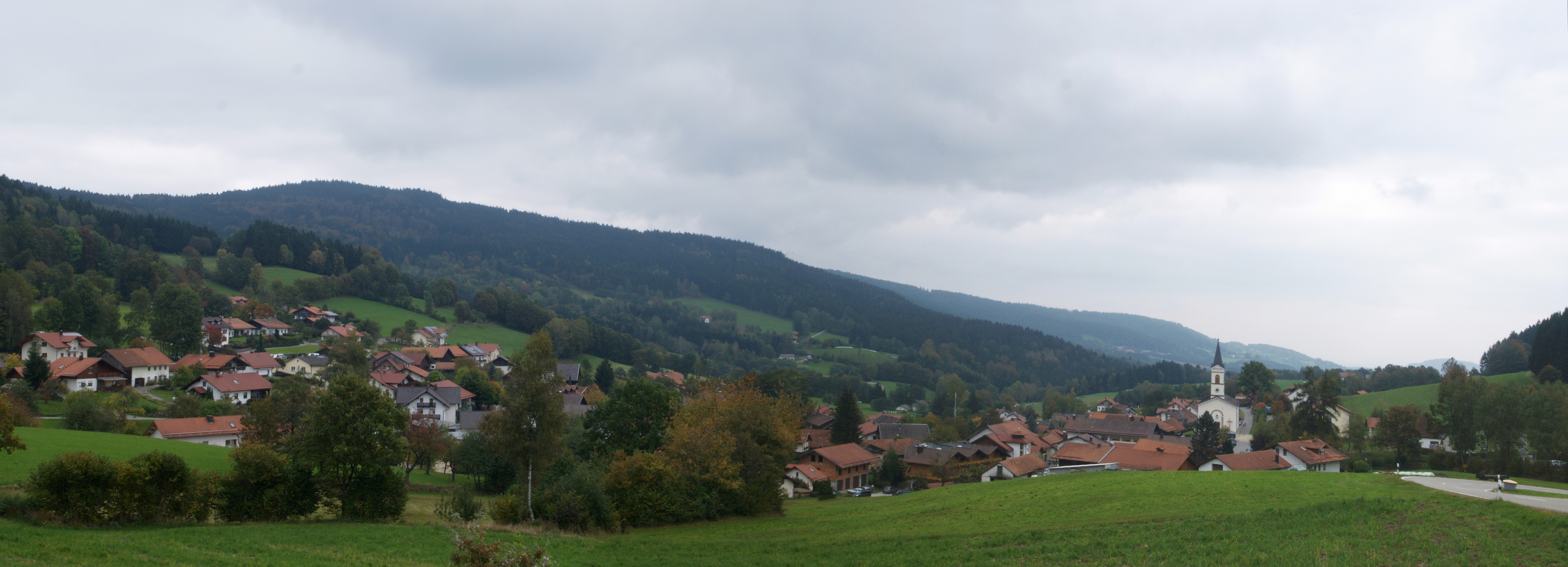
- Elisabethszell
- Interactive map of Elisabethszell
- Location within Germany Location within Bavaria
- Coordinates: 49°01′37″N 12°45′00″E
- Country: Germany
- State: Bavaria
- District: Straubing-Bogen
- Municipality: Haibach
- Elevation: 632 m (2,073 ft)

Population (1987)
  - Total: 292
- Time zone: UTC+01:00 (CET)
  - Summer (DST): UTC+02:00 (CEST)
- Postal codes: 94353
- Dialling codes: 09963, 09965

Elisabethszell is a parish village (Pfarrdorf) in the municipality of Haibach in the Lower Bavarian county of Straubing-Bogen in Germany.

== History ==
In 1346 in the place then known as Atzenzell, which belonged to the parish (Pfarrei) of Haselbach, a priory of Benedictine abbey of Oberalteich was established. It existed, with interruptions, until church land in Bavaria was seized in 1803.

In 1498 the Benedictines were driven out by the Paulsdorfs at Falkenfels Castle. It was the Countess of Schwarzenberg, who had inherited Elisabethszell from her forebears, who allowed Oberalteich Abbey to buy back the priory estates for a moderate sum in 1621, whereupon the clergy returned to Elisabethszell.

Secularisation in Bavaria in 1803 marked the end of the priory at Elisabethszell. In 1805, Elisabethszell, hitherto part of the parish of Haselbach, became an independent parish. The priory was given by the state to the municipality of Elisabethszell for the establishment of a school. On 11 July 1877 the newly built parish church was consecrated by Bishop Ignatius von Senestrey.

The old cemetery was closed in 1967 and turned into a car park in the 1970s. A new cemetery was created above the Pfarrhof. With municipal reforms in Bavaria, the former municipality of Elisabethszell lost its independence and was incorporated on 1 January 1978 into Haibach.

=== Population growth ===
Jahr	1840	1867	1871	1885	1900	1925	1950	1961	1970	1987
Population of the Pfarrdorf of Elisabethszell			220	242	255	230	289	227	264	292
Population of the municipality of Elisabethszell	745	776	776	825	821	840	906	774	745	

== Sights ==
- Parish church of St. Elisabeth. It was built from 1834 to 1837 to replace a demolished predecessor church. The church furnishings were completed between 1870 and 1875.

== Societies ==
- Elisabethszell Volunteer Fire Service (Freiwillige Feuerwehr Elisabethszell), founded in 1878.
