= Falkenfels =

- Municipality
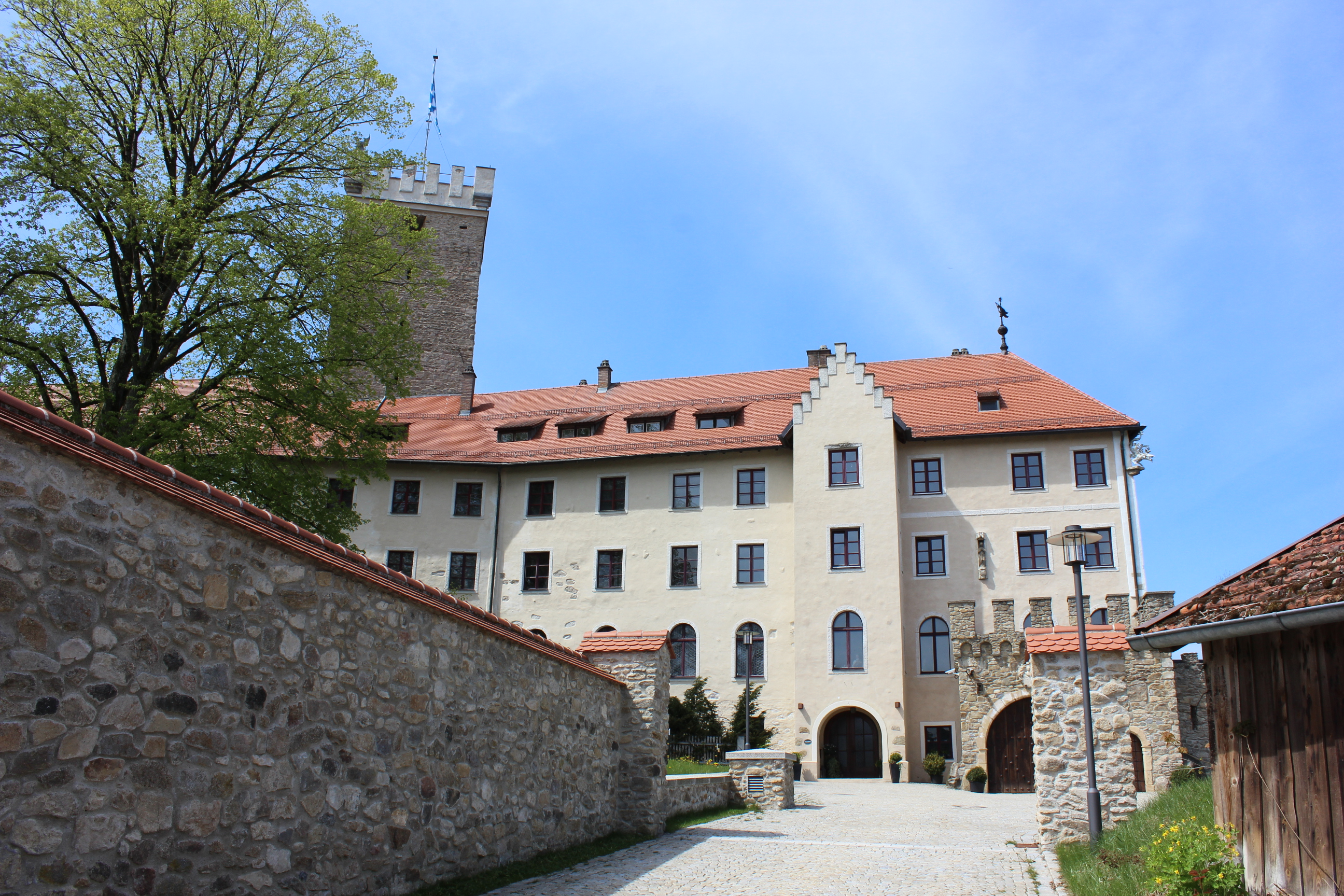
- Falkenfels Castle

- Coat of arms

- Location of Falkenfels within Straubing-Bogen district
- Interactive map of Falkenfels
- Location within Germany Location within Bavaria
- Coordinates: 49°0′N 12°36′E
- Country: Germany
- State: Bavaria
- Admin. region: Niederbayern
- District: Straubing-Bogen
- Municipal assoc.: Mitterfels

Government
  - Mayor (2020–26): Ludwig Ettl (FW)

Area
  - Total: 11.49 km^{2} (4.44 sq mi)
- Elevation: 489 m (1,604 ft)

Population (2025-12-31)
  - Total: 1,022
  - Density: 88.95/km^{2} (230.4/sq mi)
- Time zone: UTC+01:00 (CET)
  - Summer (DST): UTC+02:00 (CEST)
- Postal codes: 94350
- Dialling codes: 09961
- Vehicle registration: SR
- Website: www.falkenfels.de

Falkenfels (German pronunciation: [ˈfalkn̩fɛls]) is a municipality in the district of Straubing-Bogen in Bavaria, Germany. The English meaning of the name is "Falcon Cliff".
