= Hadriwa (Bavarian Forest, Zell) =

Mountain in Germany

- Location within Bavaria

Highest point
- Elevation: 677 m (2,221 ft)
- Coordinates: 49°7′19″N 12°24′1″E

Geography
- Location: Cham, Bavaria
- Parent range: Bavarian Forest

The Hadriwa is a mountain, 677 m above sea level, in the municipality of Zell in the county of Cham in the German state of Bavaria, and the highest point in the region south of Zell between the Perlenbach and Göppenbach streams.

There is another mountain called the Hadriwa in the Bavarian Forest in the county of Straubing-Bogen which is 922 m high.
