= Haselbach, Bavaria =

Haselbach
- Municipality
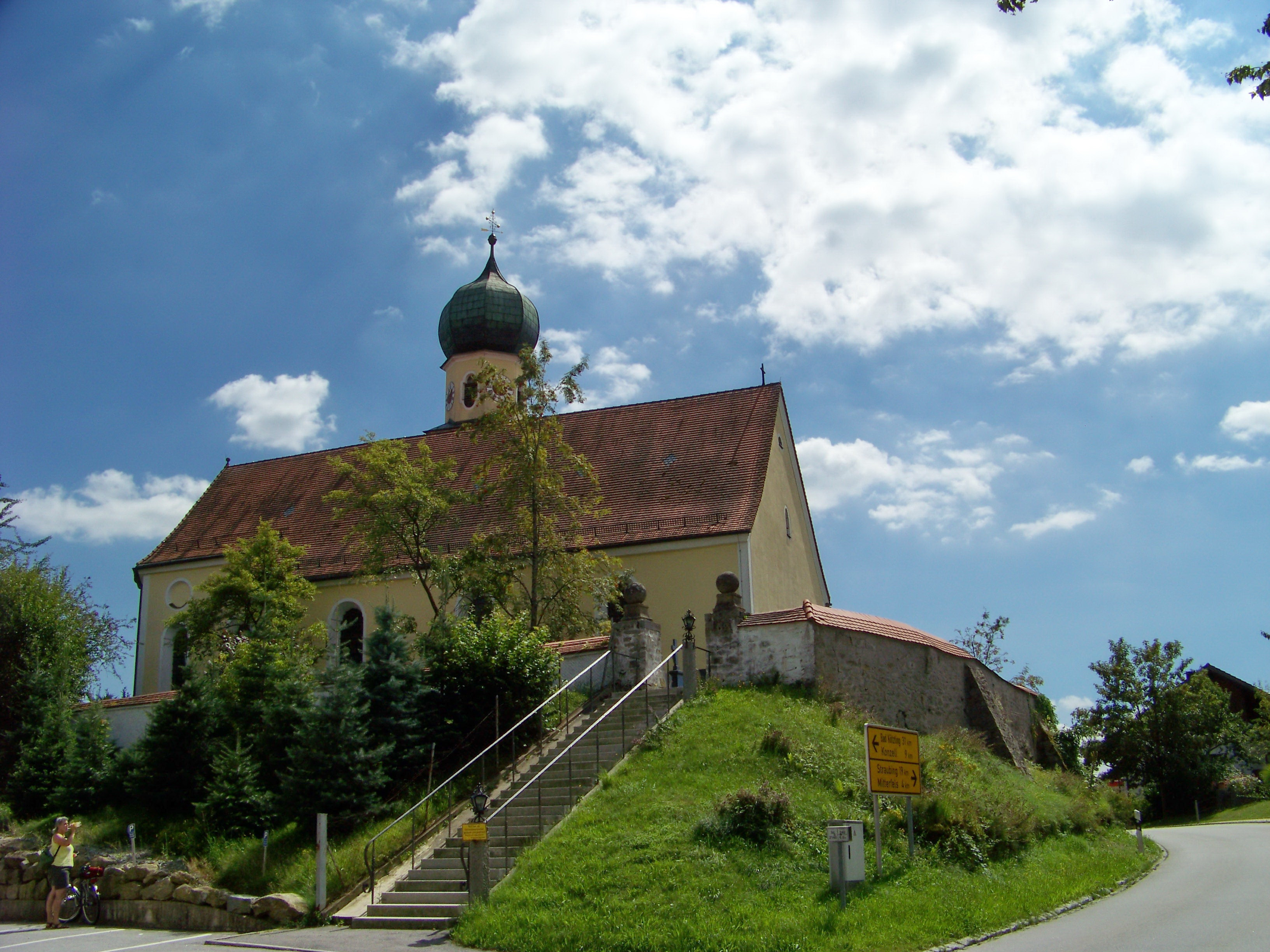
- Church of Saint James

- Coat of arms

- Location of Haselbach within Straubing-Bogen district
- Interactive map of Haselbach
- Location within Germany Location within Bavaria
- Coordinates: 49°0′N 12°42′E
- Country: Germany
- State: Bavaria
- Admin. region: Niederbayern
- District: Straubing-Bogen
- Municipal assoc.: Mitterfels

Government
  - Mayor (2020–26): Simon Haas (FW)

Area
  - Total: 18.43 km^{2} (7.12 sq mi)
- Elevation: 428 m (1,404 ft)

Population (2025-12-31)
  - Total: 1,855
  - Density: 100.7/km^{2} (260.7/sq mi)
- Time zone: UTC+01:00 (CET)
  - Summer (DST): UTC+02:00 (CEST)
- Postal codes: 94354
- Dialling codes: 09961
- Vehicle registration: SR, BOG, MAL
- Website: www.haselbach-gemeinde.de

Haselbach (German pronunciation: [ˈhaːzl̩bax]) is a municipality in the district of Straubing-Bogen in Bavaria, Germany.

== Geography ==
Situated in the southern outskirts of the Bavarian Forest, Haselbach is approximately 11 kilometres (6.8 miles) north of the Danube River. The municipality includes the village of Haselbach along with 49 other named districts.

== History ==
The village of Haselbach was first mentioned in 1130 and for centuries belonged to the estates of the Oberalteich monastery. At the end of the 17th century, the Danse-Macabre chapel, which today is the village's landmark and represented in the coat of arms, was built in the churchyard surrounding St. James's church. The municipality in its current form was established in 1818 in the course of administrative reforms in the kingdom of Bavaria.

After World War II, Haselbach vastly expanded from a loose accumulation of farmhouses to a coherent village. The population figure rose from well below 1000 after World War II to currently over 1900.
