= Menach =

River in Germany

Coordinates: 48.9231°N 12.6639°E

- The Menach in the floodplains of the Danube at Bogen

Location
- Country: Germany
- State: Bavaria

Physical characteristics
- Mouth
  - location: Kinsach
- Length: 26.1 km (16.2 mi)

Basin features
- Progression: Kinsach→ Danube→ Black Sea

Menach is a river of Bavaria, Germany. It flows into the Kinsach near Bogen.

== See also ==
- List of rivers of Bavaria
