= Kinsach =

River in Germany

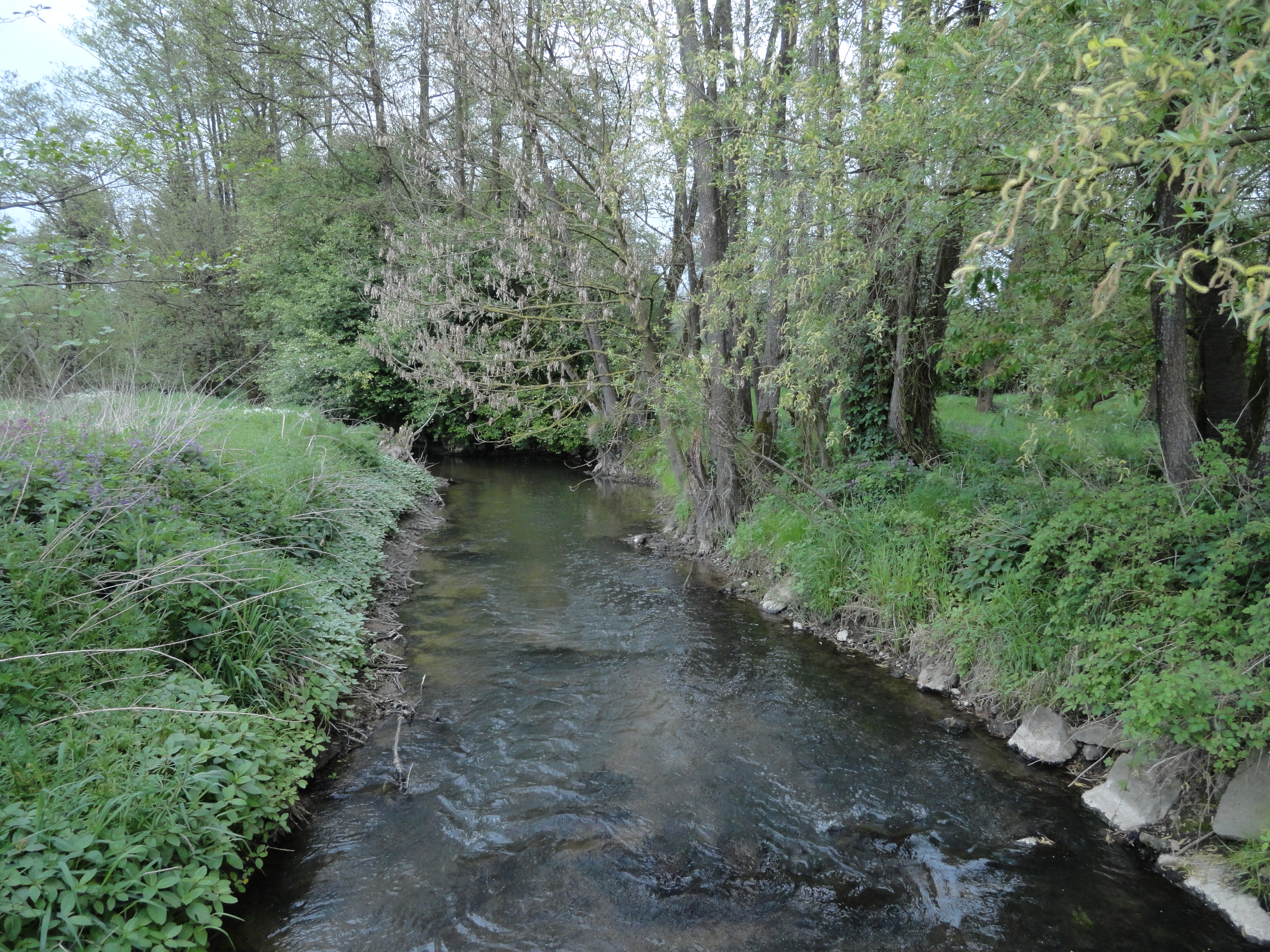
- The Kinsach at Wolferszell (part of Steinach)

Location
- Country: Germany
- State: Bavaria

Physical characteristics
- Mouth
  - location: Danube
  - coordinates: 48.9054°N 12.6877°E
- Length: 38.5 km (23.9 mi)
- Basin size: 317 km^{2} (122 sq mi)

Basin features
- Progression: Danube→ Black Sea

Kinsach is a river of Bavaria, Germany. It flows into the Danube in Bogen.

== See also ==
- List of rivers of Bavaria
