= Haibach, Lower Bavaria =

Haibach
- Municipality
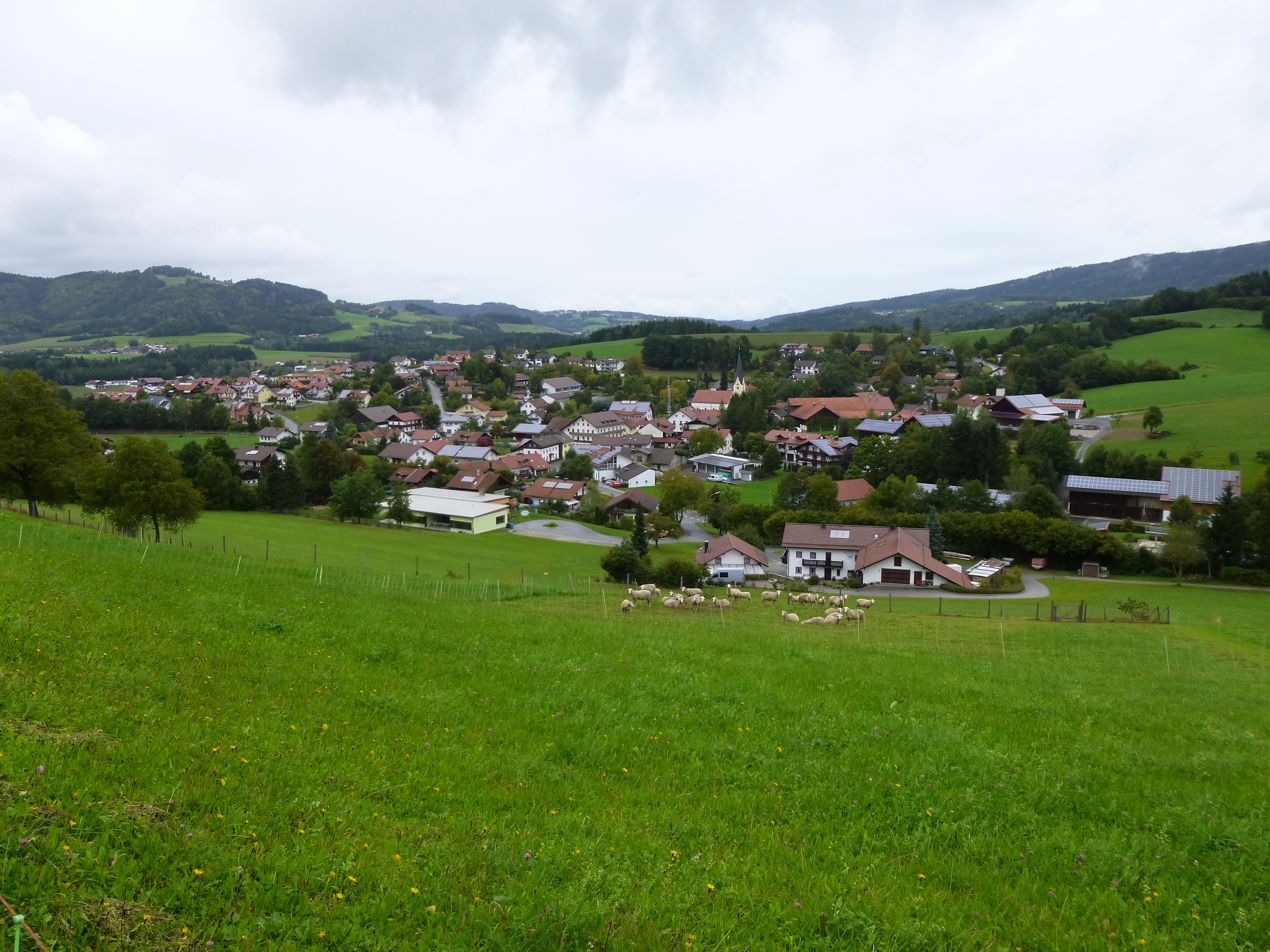
- View towards Haibach

- Coat of arms

- Location of Haibach within Straubing-Bogen district
- Interactive map of Haibach
- Location within Germany Location within Bavaria
- Coordinates: 49°2′N 12°43′E
- Country: Germany
- State: Bavaria
- Admin. region: Niederbayern
- District: Straubing-Bogen

Government
  - Mayor (2020–26): Fritz Schötz (CSU)

Area
  - Total: 32.38 km^{2} (12.50 sq mi)
- Elevation: 449–520 m (1,473–1,706 ft)

Population (2025-12-31)
  - Total: 2,025
  - Density: 62.54/km^{2} (162.0/sq mi)
- Time zone: UTC+01:00 (CET)
  - Summer (DST): UTC+02:00 (CEST)
- Postal codes: 94353
- Dialling codes: 09961, 09963, 09964, 09965
- Vehicle registration: SR
- Website: www.haibach-elisabethszell.de

Haibach (German pronunciation: [ˈhaɪbax]) is a municipality in the district of Straubing-Bogen in Bavaria, Germany.
